= General Duval =

General Duval may refer to:

- Blaise Duval (1739–1803), French Cavalry general of the Revolutionary Wars
- Isaac H. Duval (1824–1902), Union Army brigadier general and brevet
- Marcel Duval (fl. 1970s–2010s), Canadian Forces Air Command lieutenant general
- Raymond Duval (1894–1955), French Army general during the Second World War
- General Duval, Argentina, a municipality in Argentina
