= Dar El Bahdja =

- Genre: Sitcom
- Written by: Oussama Benhassine
- Directed by: Djafar Gacem
- Starring: Biyouna; Othmane Ben Daouad; Farida Sabounji; Nawal Zmit; Ahmed Amine Dellal; Souhila Mallem; Chems Eddine Lamrani; Blaha Ben Ziane
- Country of origin: Algeria
- Original language: Arabic
- No. of seasons: 1
- No. of episodes: 11

Production
- Executive producer: SD-BOX
- Running time: 20 min

Original release
- Network: Télévision Algérienne
- Release: 18 July – 28 July 2013

Dar El Bahdja (Arabic: دار البهجة) is an Algerian sitcom broadcast during the month of Ramadan 2013. It is produced by SD-BOX, directed by Djaffar Gacem, and dialogued by Mohamed Charchal.

The series tells the diaries of a popular neighborhood dwellers, problems and events among them in a comedic framework. It premiered on 2013 on Télévision Algérienne, A3 and Canal Algérie.

== Cast ==
- Biyouna as Khalti Djouhar
- Othmane Ben Daouad as Sliman
- Farida Sabounji as Khdaouaj
- Nawal Zmit as Turkiya
- Ahmed Amine Dellal as Zino
- Souhila Mallem as Zina
- Chems Eddine Lamrani as Reda
- Blaha Ben Ziane
