= 4th Moroccan Mountain Division =

- 4^{e} Division Marocaine de montagne,
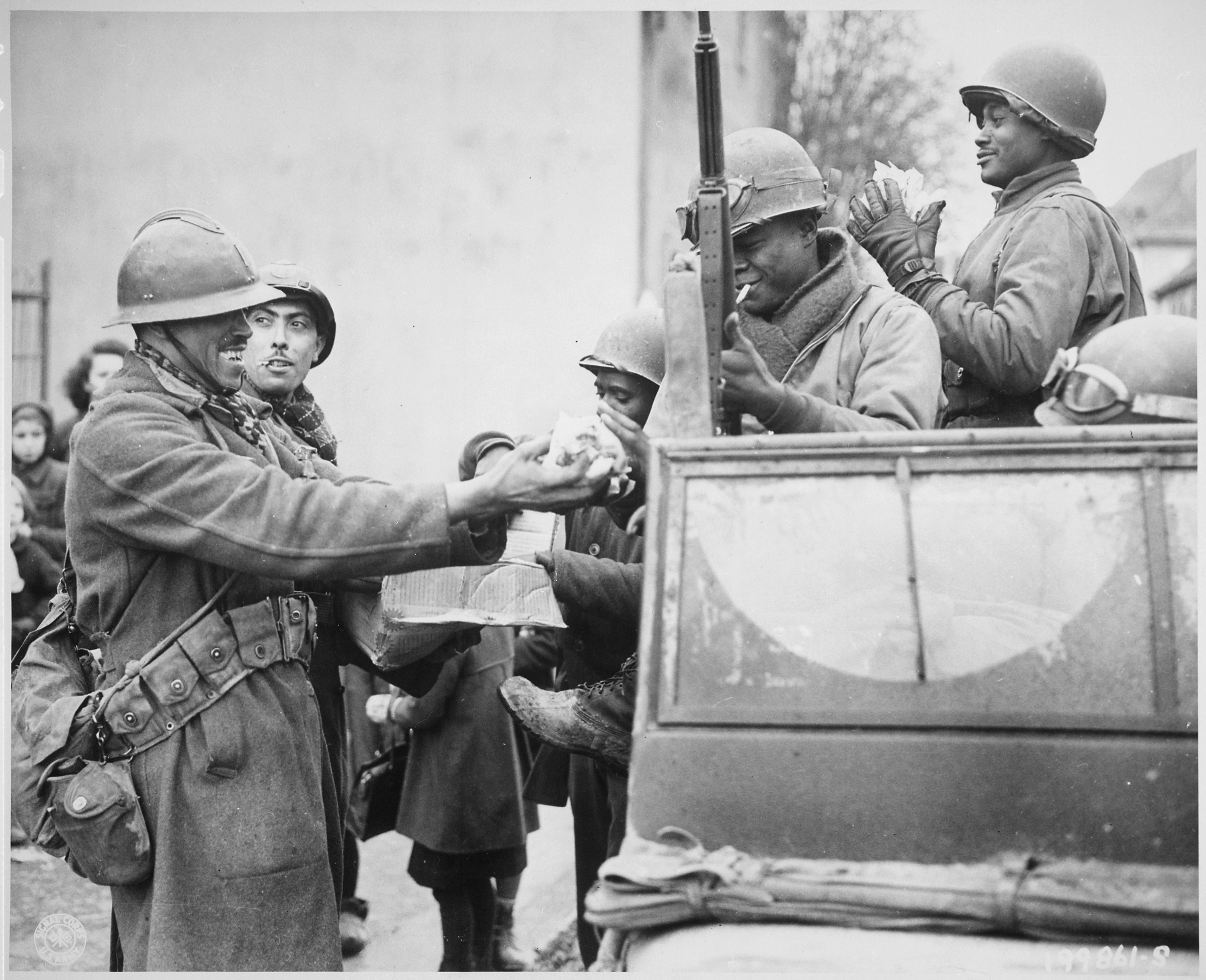
- Soldiers from 4th DMM handing candy to American soldiers in Rouffach, France on 5 February 1945.
- Active: 1 May 1943 - 15 January 1946
- Country: France
- Allegiance: French Army
- Type: Infantry Division
- Size: 20,450 personnel (february 1944): 35% Europeans; 65% Maghrebis
- Mottos: Par le djebel, à la victoire (Through the mountains, towards victory)
- Engagements: Liberation of Corsica; Italian Campaign; Operation Diadem; Battle of Alsace; Colmar Pocket; Germany and Austria

Commanders
- Notable commanders: Henry Martin; François Sevez

The 4th Moroccan Mountain Division (French: 4^{e} Division marocaine de montagne, 4^{e} DMM) was an infantry division of the Army of Africa (French: Armée d'Afrique) which participated in World War II.

Created in Morocco following the liberation of French North Africa, the division fought in Corsica, Italy, metropolitan France, and Germany. It particularly distinguished itself in Italy in 1944 as part of the French Expeditionary Corps led by General Alphonse Juin, and later in the liberation of France as part of the French 1st Army under General Jean de Lattre de Tassigny.

== World War II ==
=== Italian campaign ===
Formed at Marrakesh, Morocco as the 3rd Moroccan Division in March 1943, it was renamed 4th Moroccan Mountain Division on 1 June 1943.

In Spring 1943 the 4th DMM went to Algeria and trained in the mountainous area near Tlemcen and Oran. On 15 September 1943, it formed a combat group, the Louchet group, which participated alongside the shock battalion and the Moroccan Goumiers in reconquering the island of Corsica from 22 September to 4 October 1943.

On 18 February 1944, the 4th DMM landed in Naples, where it joined the 2nd Moroccan Infantry Division and 3rd Algerian Infantry Division as part of the French Expeditionary Corps, fighting in the Italian Campaign.

It was engaged in the Monte Cassino in the Apennine Mountains, and crossed the Aurunci Mountains in May, opening up the road to Rome. Pursuing the Germans, it captured San Gimignano on 13 July, Certaldo on 19 July and Castelfiorentino on 22 July, before regrouping around Sessa Aurunca.

The division had lost 74 officers and 1,538 soldiers killed during this campaign.

=== French & German campaign (1944-1945) ===
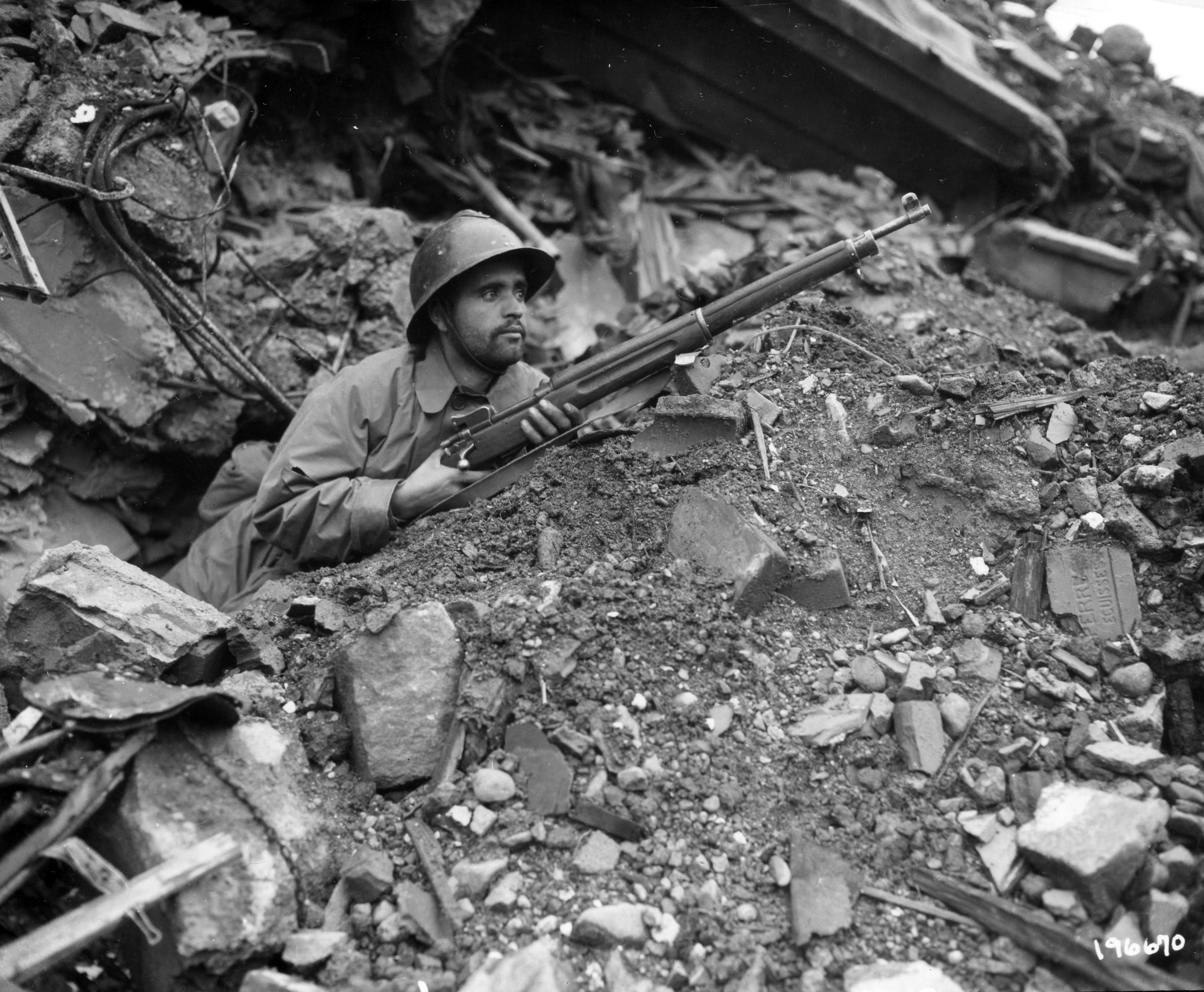
A soldier of the 4th Moroccan Division awaits an expected German counterattack in the vicinity of Mulhouse, France on 22 November 1944.

The division didn't participate in the Invasion of Southern France, but landed there at on 8 September 1944. One part of the Division headed towards the Thann valley in Alsace, while the rest of the Division relieved the 2nd DIM in the Alps against the Gebirgsjäger.

By the end of November, the 4th DMM had moved to Mulhouse in Alsace, where it was engaged in fierce combat to liberate the city. At the height of winter, it then participated in the reduction of the Colmar Pocket by advancing on the Thann-Cernay-Soultz-Rouffach axis from 20 January to 5 February 1945. Once Alsace was completely liberated, the division was entrusted with the defense of the Rhine between Basel and Sélestat.

After some weeks of rest, the Division was directed towards Strasbourg, and crossed the Rhine, entering Germany on 16 April 1945. Its mission was to bypass the Black Forest by its eastern edge, and reach the northern border of Switzerland as quickly as possible. Jostling the last resistances of the Wehrmacht, it reached Lake Constance after passing through Freudenstadt, Schwenningen and Donaueschingen. 4 DMM then entered Austria on 2 May 1945 and ended the war in Vorarlberg. Since the landing in Provence, its losses amounted to 28 officers and 565 soldiers.

After a few months of occupation of Austria, the division returned to France, where it was dissolved on 15 January 1946 in the Lyon region.

== Composition ==
- 1st Regiment of Moroccan Tirailleurs
- 2nd Regiment of Moroccan Tirailleurs, replaced by 1st Regiment of Algerian Tirailleurs in August 1944
- 6th Regiment of Moroccan Tirailleurs
- 27th Infantry Regiment : replaced the 1st Regiment of Algerian Tirailleurs in February 1945
- 4e régiment de spahis marocains

== Division Commanders ==
- June - September 1943: Général Henry Martin.
- September 1943 - December 1944: Général François Sevez
- December 1944 - 1945: Général André Navereau
- 1945 - January 1946 : Général René de Hesdin

== See also ==
- Moroccan Division
- French Expeditionary Corps (1943–1944)

== Sources ==
- Avec la 4e division marocaine de montagne, Braun & Cie, 1945.
- De Lattre de Tassigny, Histoire de la première armée française - Plon - 1949.
- Paul Gaujac, Le Corps expéditionnaire français en Italie, Histoire et collections, 2003
