= Rendezvous with Destiny =

Rendezvous with Destiny may refer to:

- Rendezvous with Destiny (TV series), a 2007 Algerian television series
- A 1936 presidential nomination acceptance speech by Franklin D. Roosevelt — see 1936 Democratic National Convention
- A 1952 book titled Rendezvous With Destiny: A History of Modern American Reform — see Eric F. Goldman
- A 1964 television program that included a speech by Ronald Reagan in support of Barry Goldwater — see A Time for Choosing
- U.S. Army 101st Airborne Division Motto
