= Malika Belbey =

Algerian actress (born 1974)

- Born: June 15, 1974 (age 52); Tiaret, Algeria
- Education: Algiers School of Dramatic Arts
- Occupation: Actress
- Years active: 2004-present
- Notable work: Barakat!
- Television: The Player

Malika Belbey (born 15 June 1974) is an Algerian actress.

== Biography ==
Belbey was born in Tiaret, in western Algeria. She graduated from the Algiers School of Dramatic Arts. Belbey began her career in the theatre by acting in "Nedjma," which was adapted from the novel written by Kateb Yacine and directed by Ziani Cherif Ayad. She made her television debut in 2004 in The Player. Belbey made her cinematic debut in 2006, in Barakat! In 2007, she appeared in the film Morituri, based on the novel by Yasmina Khadra. The thriller follows a police officer who investigates a terrorist group during the Algerian Civil War. Belbey starred in the TV series Djemai Family in 2008. She appeared in Ad-Dhikra El Akhira in 2010 and 2011.

In March 2014, she was honored at the 13th Gulf Radio and TV Festival in Bahrain. In 2019, Belbey played two different roles in Salim Hamdi's Reconnaissance. She received the Best Actress Prize at the Maghreb Film Festival in Oujda, Morocco. Belbey starred as Nabila in the 2020 television series Yema. She described her character as a woman who has suffered a lot of injustice but was able to rebuild her life and create a home despite spending 10 years in prison. After reading the script, Belbey was afraid of playing a similar role as in previous soap operas, and worked with director Madih Belaïd to flesh out the character.

== Filmography ==
=== Movies ===
- 2006 : Barakat!
- 2007 : Morituri
- 2008 : Le dernier passager (short film)
- 2009 : Point final 1er novembre 1954
- 2019 : Reconnaissance

=== Television ===
- 2004 : The Player : Sonia
- 2006 : Le printemps noir
- 2008 : Rendezvous with Destiny : Hanane
- 2008 : Djemai Family : The Indian Adra (season 1 episode 17)
- 2010-2011 : Ad-Dhikra El Akhira : Halima
- 2015 : Weld Mama
- 2018 : Lella zineb
- 2019 : Rays Kourso
- 2019 : Wlad Lahlal : Zoulikha
- 2020 : Ahwal Anes : Mother of Redha
- 2020 : Yema : Nabila
