= Kawther El Bardi =

Tunisian actress

- كوثر الباردي
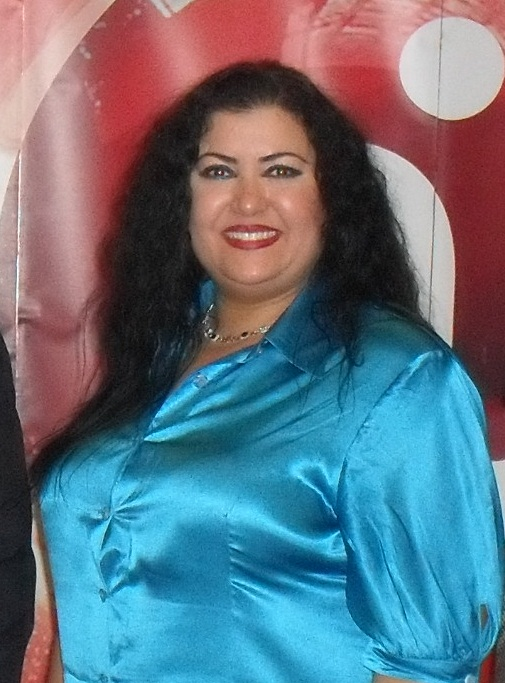
- El Bardi on 1 May 2009
- Born: September 4, 1971 (age 54); Tunisia
- Occupations: Actress, Television presenter
- Spouse: Adel Younis
- Children: 1

Kawther El Bardi (Arabic: كوثر الباردي) (born on 4 September 1971) is a Tunisian actress.

== Personal life ==
El Bardi is married to the Tunisian singer Adel Younes. They have a daughter, Chahd Younes.

== Filmography ==
=== Cinema ===
- 1992 : Poussière de diamants by Mahmoud Ben Mahmoud and Fadhel Jaibi
- 1997 : Bent Familia by Nouri Bouzid
- 1997 : Tunisians by Nouri Bouzid: Meriam
- 1998 : Festin (short film) by Mohamed Damak
- 2004 : Noce d'été by Mokhtar Ladjimi
- 2005 : Khochkhach by Salma Baccar : Saida

=== Television ===
==== Tunisian series ====
- 1992 : Liyam Kif Errih (Days are like wind) by Slaheddine Essid : Fatma
- 1993 : El Assifa (The storm) by Abdelkader Jerbi : Aziza
- 1995 : Faj El Raml by Mohamed Ghodhbane and Hussein Mahnouche
- 1995 : Da3bel Akhou Dahbel (Daaebel, the father of Dahbel) by Noureddine Chouchane, Hassan Ghodhbane and Mohsen Arfaoui : Nafissa, the wife of Dahbel
- 1995 : Handhala Abou Rayhana (Handhala, the father of Rayhana) by Fawaz Abdelaki, Marwen Baraket and Mohsen Arfaoui
- 1997 : Al Moutahadi (The Challenger) by Moncef Kateb : Najet
- 1997 : Bent El Khazef (The Potter's Daughter) by Habib Mselmani and Abdellatif El Béhi : Atika
- 1998 : Ichka w Hkeyet (Love and stories) by Slaheddine Essid, Mongi Ben Tara and Ali Louati
- 1999 : Anbar Ellil (Night Ward) by Habib Mselmani : Aïcha
- 2001 : Dhafayer (Braids) by Habib Mselmani
- 2002 : Farhat Lamor (Happiness of Lifetime) by Ezzedine Gannoun : Farah
- 2003 : Chez Azaïez (At Azaiez) by Slaheddine Essid : Bahiga
- 2004 : Loutil (The Hostel) by Slaheddine Essid : Jamila alias Jiji (The Director's Wife)
- 2007 : Fi Kol Youm Hkeya (A Story Everyday)
- 2008-2009 : Maktoub (Destiny)(seasons 1-2) by Sami Fehri: Chelbia alias Chobbi
- 2010-2018 : Nsibti Laaziza (My dear Mother-in-law) by Slaheddine Essid : Hayet El Béhi
- 2012 : Dar Louzir (The Minister's House) by Slaheddine Essid : Halima
- 2021 : Ken Ya Makenech (season 1) by Abdelhamid Bouchnak : Snow White
- 2022 : Baraa (Innocence) by Mourad Ben Cheikh and Sami Fehri : Mounira

==== Algerian series ====
- 2008-2009 : Djemai Family by Djaffar Gacem : Sakina
- 2015, 2017 and 2021 : Sultan Achour 10 (seasons 1-2-3) by Djaffar Gacem: Ennouria

==== TV movies ====
- 2007 : Puissant (Powerful) by Habib Mselmani

==== Emissions ====
- 2009-2010 : Sofiène show on Tunisie 7 : The judge
- 2010-2012 : Memnou Al Rjel (Forbidden to men) on Nessma: host of the “family” section
- 2013 : Sghaier Saghroun on Nessma : animator
- 2014 : Couzinetna Hakka on Nessma : animator
- 2016 : Materna Show (season 2) on Tunisna TV : animator

==== Videos ====
- 2007 : advertising spot for the Tunisian butter brand Jadida
- 2018 : advertising spot for Aziza stores

=== Theater ===
Kawther El Bardi is also a theater actress. She has participated in numerous plays:

- 2004 : Dar El Hana (The Happiness Home), script by Jalal Eddine Saâdi and directed by Ikram Azzouz as Saida
- 2004 : Ah, Ah, ya Mahbouba by Abdelaziz Meherzi
- 2009 : Chwaya Meddonia (A Little Bit of Life) by Jalel Eddine Saadi and Yosra Kasbaoui
- 2009 : Hira w Tchitine, written and directed by Zouhair Erraies
- 2011 : Ellil Zéhi (The Delightful Night), adaptation and staging of Farhat Jedid
- 2011 : Mosaïque, written and directed by Zouhair Erraies
- 2013 : Ahwal (Status), written and directed by Mohamed Kouka
- 2014 : 24h ultimatum, script by Jalel Eddine Saadi and directed by Mongi Ben Hafsia
- 2015 : Dhalamouni Habaybi (My Beloved were unfair with me), directed by Abdelaziz Meherzi
- Le Génie de la passion (The Genius of Passion), text by Tahar Fazâa and directed by Ikram Azzouz
- Ala Wahda w Noss by Kawther El Bardi and Jalel Eddine Saadi with the direction of Zouhair Erraies
- 2016 : Nightmare with the direction of Zouhair Erraies
- 2017 : Mamma mia with the direction of Chekib Ghanmi
- 2018 : Taieb coughed, written by Mohsen Ben Nfissa and directed by Abdelaziz Mehrezi

== Radio ==
- 2014 : Jawwek 9-12 on Radio IFM : animator
