= Djaffar Gacem =

Algerian filmmaker

Djafar Gacem جعفر قاسم
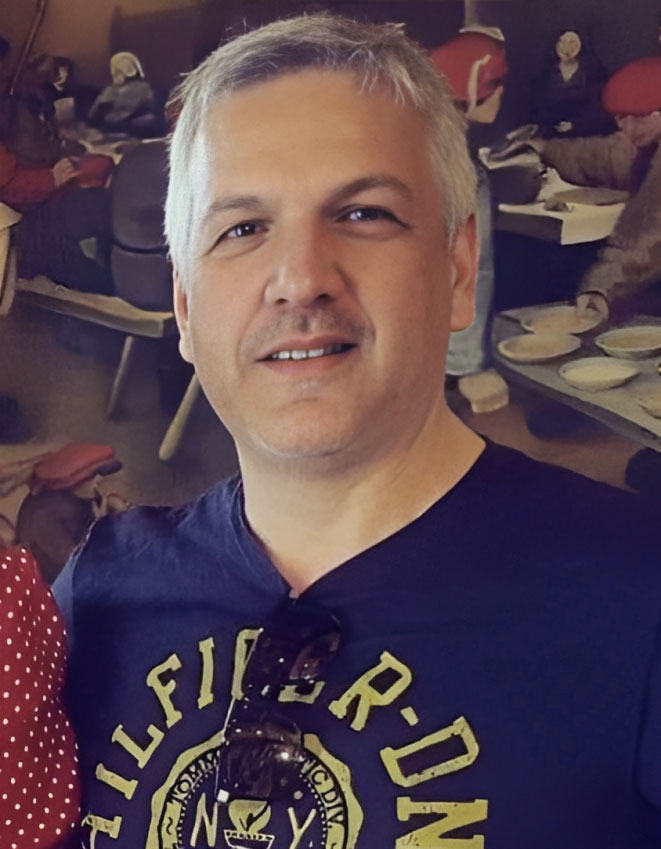
- Djaffar Gacem in 2018.
- Born: September 18, 1966 (age 59); Sidi-Aich, Algeria
- Other names: Djaffar Gacem
- Occupations: Director, producer, screenwriter
- Years active: 1998–present

Djaffar Gacem (born 18 September 1966), sometimes as Djaâfar Gacem, is an Algerian director. He is best known as the director of popular television serials and films Nass Mlah City, Djemai Family, Sultan Achour 10 and Bouzid Days.

== Personal life ==
He was born on September 18, 1966, in Sidi-Aich, Béjaïa, Algeria.

== Career ==
In 2001, he directed the television sitcom Nass Mlah City which first aired on Télévision Algérienne, Canal Algérie and A3 on November 6, 2002. The sitcoms enjoyed high ratings in Algeria in the 2000s. The series concluded in March 2006 after 119 episodes over three seasons. In 2006, he won the Award for Best Director at the Fennec d'or festivals for the series.

Following the success of the Nass Mlah City, he directed the next television series Djemai Family in 2008 which was awarded Best Director at the Fennec d'or Festival. Then in 2013, he made the series Dar El Bahdja and then Sultan Achour 10 in 2015. In 2019, he directed his first historical fiction feature film Héliopolis. The screening of the film had to be delayed due to the COVID-19 pandemic impact on the film industry in Algeria. The trailer was released on October 25, 2020, and was finally screened under strict health conditions on November 4, 2020. It was selected as the Algerian entry for the Best International Feature Film at the 93rd Academy Awards. Djaafar Gassem's latest work "dar lefchouch" aired for the first time in Ramadan 2023, and the second season in Ramadan 2024 The series achieved great success.

== Filmography ==
Year	Film	Role	Genre	Ref.
1998–2002	Jil Music	Director	Musical show	
2002–2004–2005	Nass Mlah City	Director, Producer, Writer	TV series	
2005	Mobilis: 2 millions d'abonnés	Executive producer	Short film	
2005	Mobilink: Oria	Executive producer	Short film	
2006	Binatna	Director	TV series	
2006	L'Autre visage		TV series	
2007	Mawid Maa El Qadar	Director, Writer	TV series	
2008–2009–2011	Djemai Family	Director, Executive producer	TV series	
2013	Dar El Bahdja	Director	TV series	
2015–2017–2019	Sultan Achour 10	Director, Writer	TV series	
2016	Bouzid Days	Director	TV series	
2016	Le retour de l'inspecteur Tahar	Director	TV series	
2020	Héliopolis	Director, Writer	Film	
2023–2024	Dar El Fechouch	Director	TV series	
2026	Fatma	Director, Writer	TV series	
