= Aziz Smati =

- Born: Algiers, Algeria
- Citizenship: Algerian
- Occupations: Producer, director, television host
- Notable work: (see filmography)

Aziz Smati is an Algerian television producer, director and presenter. He is known for his role in promoting modern Algerian music (Raï, Rock music, Rap) on radio and television, for creating the comic character Inspector Mergou and for being the target of an attack in 1994 that left him seriously injured.

== Career ==
=== Radio ===
Smati hosted and produced programmes dedicated to the local scene (Le Rock Local), helping to promote bands and artists marginalised by traditional formats.

=== Bled Music ===
He is one of the artistic directors of the programme Bled Music, hosted by Farid Rockeur and Kamel Dynamite and produced by ENTV, which broadcast music videos and performances by Raï, Rock music and Rap artists and gave unprecedented visibility to several Algerian musicians in the early 1990s.

=== Music videos and cultural initiatives ===
Smati has directed music videos and participated in collective projects with a social and political dimension, such as the video linked to the Algérie malgré tout (Algeria despite everything) campaign and other artistic initiatives that brought together musicians in solidarity with the victims of terrorism.

=== Inspector Mergou ===
Aziz Smati is traditionally associated with the creation of the humorous character Inspector Mergou, who was later reprised in subsequent productions. The character has become part of Algerian popular culture and is part of the satirical heritage linked to social protest.

=== Alger Nooormal ===
Smati collaborated with Mohamed Ali Allalou on the Alger Nooormal project (a book/multimedia project), which brings together texts by Mustapha Benfodil, photographs and interviews about Algiers and its transformations; this project is documented in critical reviews and academic reports.

=== Rap projects ===
Memoirs of the Algerian rap scene mention collectives (such as Brigade Anti Massacre) and projects that benefited from Aziz Smati's logistical support during their preparation phase.

== Filmography / productions ==
- Qabassa Chema — satirical TV show (ENTV) — producer / actor
- Bled Music — musical television program (ENTV) — producer / director / artistic director
- Algérie malgré tout (solidarity music video and actions) — director
- Alger Nooormal — multimedia coordination / production

== Attack of 14 February 1994 and aftermath ==
On 14 February 1994, Aziz Smati was the victim of an attack that left him seriously injured and with lasting effects, leaving him paraplegic. This event was part of a wave of attacks targeting cultural figures during Algeria's dark decade; it has been commemorated and featured in articles recounting his journey and resilience.

== Tributes ==
Smati has received several tributes over the years, from local and national initiatives. A press article specifically mentions a tribute ceremony (along with other tributes, including one by Cherif Kheddam in 2001). Other tributes and cultural reports highlight his role in producing music videos and collective events linked to the memory of the black decade.

== See also ==
- algerian television
- Farid Rockeur
