= Sétif and Guelma massacre =

1945 mass murder of Muslims in French Algeria

- Part of the aftermath of World War II
- Map of the massacre
- Location: 28°N 02°E; French Algeria
- Date: 8 May – 26 June 1945
- Attack type: Massacre, communal violence
- Deaths: 3,000 to 45,000
- Victim: Algerian Muslims
- Perpetrators: French authorities and pied-noir militias: General Raymond Duval
- Motive: Repression of demonstrations that demand Algerian independence; killing of 102 French settlers by rioters

The Sétif and Guelma massacre (Note: French: Massacres de Sétif et Guelma; Arabic: مجزرة سطيف و قالمة) (also called the Sétif, Guelma and Kherrata massacres (Note: French: Massacres de Sétif, Guelma et Kherrata) or the massacres of 8 May 1945 (Note: Arabic: مجازر 8 مايو 1945)) was a series of massacres by French colonial authorities and pied-noir European settler militias on Algerian civilians in May and June 1945 around the towns of Sétif and Guelma in French Algeria.

In response to French police firing on demonstrators during a protest in Sétif on 8 May 1945, native Algerians rioted in the town and attacked French settlers (colons) in the surrounding countryside, killing 102 people. The French colonial authorities and European settlers retaliated by killing thousands of Algerians in the region with estimates varying widely. The initial estimate given by French authorities was 1,020 killed, while the current Algerian government cites an estimate of 45,000 killed. Estimates by historians range from 3,000 to 30,000 Algerians killed. The massacre marked a turning point in Franco-Algerian relations, ultimately leading to the Algerian War of Independence from 1954 to 1962.

== Background ==
The anti-colonialist movement started to formalise and organise before World War II, under the leadership of Messali Hadj and Ferhat Abbas. However, the participation of Algeria in the war catalysed the rise of Algerian nationalism.

Algiers served as the capital of Free France from 1943, which created hope for many Algerian Muslim nationalists to achieve independence. In 1943, Ferhat Abbas published a manifesto that claimed the right of Algerians to have a constitution and a state associated with France. The lack of a French reaction led to the creation of the "Amis du Manifeste et de la Liberté" (AML) and eventually resulted in the rise of nationalism.

Hundreds of thousands of Algerians joined protests in several cities to demand their rights. Contemporary factors other than the emergence of Arab nationalism included widespread drought and famine in the rural Constantine Province, where the European settlers were a minority. In the city of Guelma, for instance, there were 4,000 settlers and 16,500 Muslim Algerians.

In April 1945, growing racial tensions led to a senior French official proposing the creation of an armed settler militia in Guelma. With the end of World War II in Europe, 5,000 protesters took to the streets of Sétif, a town in northern Algeria, to press new demands for independence on the French administration.

== Events ==
=== Initial demonstration and killings ===
Flag of the Algerian nationalists in 1945

The initial outbreak occurred on the morning of 8 May 1945, the same day that Nazi Germany surrendered in World War II. About 5,000 Muslims paraded in Sétif to celebrate the victory. Some carried banners attacking colonial rule. There were clashes between the marchers and the local French gendarmerie when the latter tried to seize those banners.

There is uncertainty over who fired first but both protesters and police were shot. News from Sétif incited the poor and nationalist rural population, and led to Algerian attacks on pieds-noirs in the Sétif countryside (Kherrata, Chevreul). The attacks were spontaneous and carried out by lightly armed groups using agricultural tools, bladed weapons and hunting rifles. The attacks resulted in the deaths of 90 European colonial settlers, plus another 100 wounded. A smaller and peaceful protest of Algerian People's Party activists in the neighbouring town of Guelma was violently repressed that evening by colonial police, and an additional 12 settlers died in the countryside around Guelma. The attacks on settlers lasted until May 12.

=== French repression in Sétif ===
After five days of chaos, the French colonial military and police suppressed the rebellion. On instructions from Paris, they carried out a series of reprisals against Muslim civilians for the attacks on French colonial settlers. The army, which included the Foreign Legion, Moroccan and Senegalese troops, conducted summary executions in the course of a ratissage ("raking-over") of Algerian Muslim rural communities suspected of involvement. Less accessible mechtas (Muslim villages) were bombed by French aircraft between 9 and 19 May. Twelve Martin B-26 Marauders and twelve Douglas SBD Dauntless carried out dozens of sorties, dropping 41 tons of bombs. The cruiser Duguay-Trouin, standing off the coast in the Gulf of Bougie, shelled Aokas ten times on 10 and 11 May. Pied-noir vigilantes lynched prisoners taken from local jails. They randomly shot Muslims out of hand who were not wearing the white armbands ordered by the army. It is certain that the great majority of the Muslim victims had not been implicated in the original outbreak.

=== French repression in Guelma ===
French repression in the Guelma region differed from that in Sétif in that while only 12 pieds-noirs had been killed in the countryside, official and militia attacks on Algerian civilians lasted for weeks, until 26 June. The Constantine préfet, Lestrade-Carbonnel had supported the creation of European settler militias, while the Guelma sous-préfet, André Achiari, created an informal justice system (Comité de Salut Public) designed to encourage the violence of settler vigilantism against unarmed civilians, and to facilitate the identification and murder of nationalist activists. He also instructed police and army intelligence agencies to assist the settler militias. Muslim victims killed in both urban and rural areas were buried in mass graves in such places as Kef-el-Boumba. Later officials had the corpses dug up and burned en masse in Héliopolis.

== Victims ==
Estimates for the number of people killed vary widely. The official figure given by the French authorities in the Tubert report shortly after the massacre was 1,020 killed, while Radio Cairo provided an estimate of 45,000 Algerians killed at the time of the massacre. Additionally, the Tubert report also estimated that 102 French settlers were killed and 900 Algerian Muslims were also killed by rioters.

French historian Charles-Robert Ageron estimates that 5,000 to 6,000 people were killed in the massacre. French historians Maurice Faivre, François Cochet, Guy Pervillé, and Roger Vétillard estimated the death toll at between 3,000 and 8,000. Jean-Pierre Peyroulou, correlating Allies' statistics and historian Marcel Reggui's testimony, concludes that there were 5,000 to 6,000 deaths in the regions of Sétif–Kherrata–Béjaïa and 1,500 to 2,000 deaths in Guelma, with thousands more wounded which would include an unknown number who later died from their injuries. He concludes that historian Jean-Louis Planche's estimate of 20,000 to 30,000 deaths is too high but adds that an estimate of 15,000 and 20,000 deaths given by Algerian nationalist Ferhat Abbas is plausible. Peyroulou notes an estimate of 6,000 killed and 14,000 wounded given by the British General Staff in North Africa. The current Algerian government cites an estimate of 45,000 killed.

According to British historian Alistair Horne, an estimate of 6,000 Algerians killed was settled on by a consensus of historians.

The identity of the Muslim Algerian victims differed in Sétif and Guelma. In the countryside outside Sétif, some victims were nationalists who had taken part in the insurrection, but the majority were uninvolved civilians who simply lived in the same area. But in Guelma, French settler vigilantes specifically targeted nationalist activists. Most victims were male (13% of the men in Guelma were killed), either members of the AML, the Muslim scouts, or the local CGT.

Following the military repression, the French administration arrested 4,560 Muslims, of whom 99 were sentenced to death. Twenty-two of the death sentences were carried out.

== Legacy ==
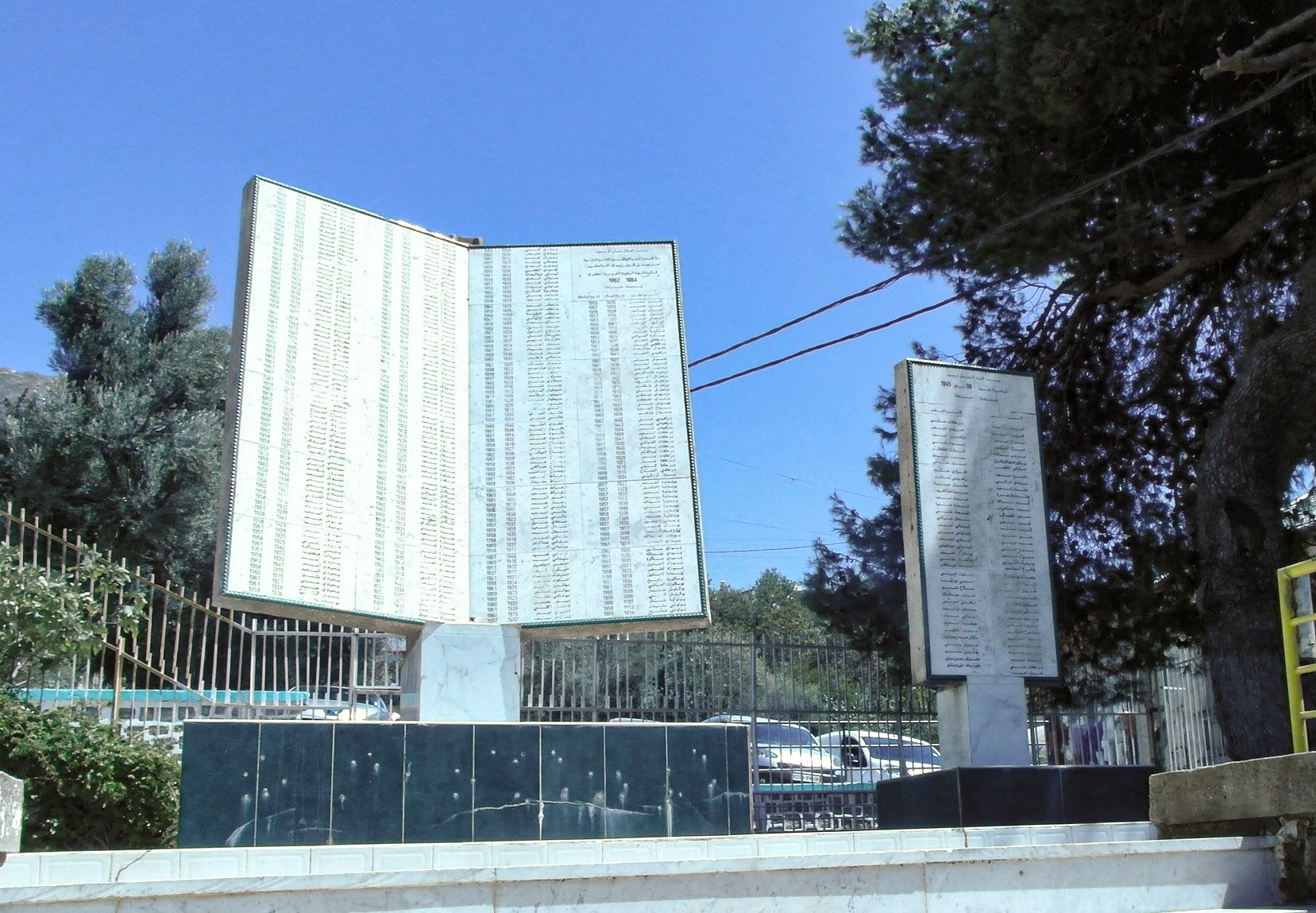
Monument erected in memory of the victims of the massacres of 8 May 1945 in Kherrata (Béjaïa)

The Sétif outbreak and the repression that followed marked a turning point in the relations between France and the Muslim population under its nominal control since 1830, when France had colonised Algeria. While the details of the Sétif killings were largely overlooked in metropolitan France, the effect on the Algerian Muslim population was traumatic, especially on the large numbers of Muslim veterans of the French Army who were returning from the war in Europe. They had hoped their service would improve their rights and status in Algeria.

Nine years later, a general uprising began in Algeria, leading to independence from France in March 1962 with the signing of the Évian Accords. The 1945 massacre was censored in France until 1960.

=== Legacy in Algeria ===
In a secret report to General Henry Martin, French Army General Raymond Duval, the officer chiefly responsible for presiding over the massacre, warned that while he had bought time for the colonial government, they could not keep using brute force to suppress Algerian nationalists. He advised them to enact reforms immediately. Without reforms being enacted, Duval warned that not only would Algerians rise up in the future, they might triumph next time.

"I have secured you peace for 10 years. If France does nothing, it will all happen again, only next time it will be worse and may well be irreparable."

From 1954 to 1988, the massacres of Sétif and Guelma were commemorated in Algeria but it was considered a relatively minor event compared to 1 November 1954, the beginning of the Algerian war for independence; this had legitimised the one-party regime. The members of the National Liberation Front (FLN), as rebels and as State members, did not want to emphasize the importance of May 1945. This would have involved acknowledging that there were other contradictory currents of nationalism, such as Messali Hadj's Algerian National Movement, that opposed the FLN.

With the democratisation movement of 1988, Algerians "rediscovered" a history different from the one told by the regime, as the regime itself was questioned. Research about the massacres of May 1945 was conducted, and a memorial wall was erected to remember these events. The presidency of Liamine Zéroual and Abdelaziz Bouteflika, and the Fondation du 8 Mai 1945, started using the memories of the massacres as a political tool to discuss the consequences of the "colonial genocide" by France.

=== Semantic debates: genocide, massacre or politicide ===
The words used to refer to the events often carry a memorial connotation or are chosen for political purposes. Historical research and writings now apply the word massacre to the Muslim Algerian victims of May 1945. It was first used by the French in their propaganda of the 1940s to refer to the 102 European colonial settler victims, apparently to justify the French suppression.

The word genocide, used by Bouteflika, for example, is not applied to the events in Guelma, since the Algerian victims there were reportedly targeted because of their nationalist activism. B. Harff and Ted R. Gurr accordingly classify the Guelma massacre as a politicide.

According to Jacques Sémelin, the term massacre is a more useful methodological tool for historians to study an event whose definition is debated.

=== Effects on modern Algerian–French relations ===
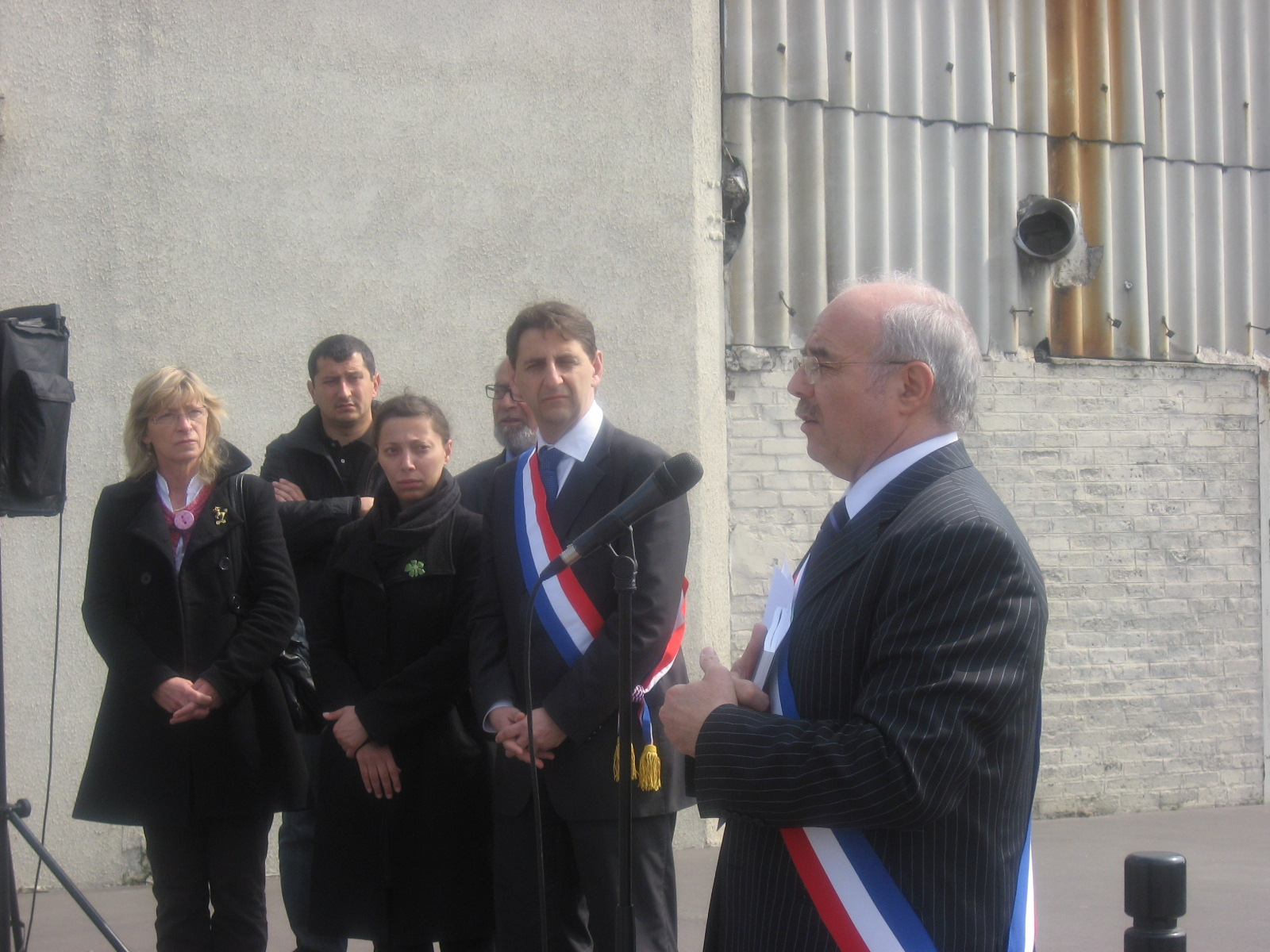
French officials during a remembrance ceremony for victims of the Setif massacre, held in Aubervilliers on 9 May 2010

In February 2005, Hubert Colin de Verdière, France's ambassador to Algeria, formally apologised for the massacre, calling it an "inexcusable tragedy". His statement was described as "the most explicit comments by the French state on the massacre".

In 2017, French presidential candidate, Emmanuel Macron considered colonialism as "a crime against humanity". On 8 May 2020, Algerian President, Abdelmadjid Tebboune, decided to commemorate the day at the 75th anniversary of the massacre.

== In popular culture ==
The Algerian cinema, an industry where war movies are popular, depicted the massacres more than once. When Outside the Law by Rachid Bouchareb was nominated for Best Picture in the 2010 Cannes Film Festival, French pieds-noirs, Harkis and war veterans demonstrated against the film being shown in French cinemas, accusing it of distorting reality.

Héliopolis, a 2021 film directed by Djafar Gacem about the massacre, was selected as the Algerian entry for the Best International Feature Film at the 94th Academy Awards.

== See also ==
- 1961 Paris massacre
- List of massacres in Algeria
- Outside the Law (2010 film)
- Levant Crisis
- Thiaroye massacre, 1944
- Jallianwala Bagh massacre, 1919
- Lynching of African-American veterans after World War I

== Bibliography ==
- Courrière, Yves, La guerre d'Algérie, tome 1 (Les fils de la Toussaint), Fayard, Paris 1969, ISBN 2-213-61118-1.
- Horne, Alistair, A Savage War of Peace: Algeria 1954–1962, New York 1978, Viking Press, ISBN 0-670-61964-7.
- Hussey, Andrew, "The French Intifida: The Long War between France and Its Arabs", London 2014, Granta ISBN 978-184708-259-6.
- Planche, Jean Louis, Sétif 1945, histoire d'un massacre annoncé, Perrin, Paris 2006, ISBN 2262024332.
- Vallet, Eugène, Un drame algérien. La vérité sur les émeutes de mai 1945, éd. Grandes éditions françaises, 1948, OCLC 458334748.
- Vétillard, Roger, Sétif. Mai 1945. Massacres en Algérie, éd. de Paris, 2008, ISBN 978-2-85162-213-6.
- Afro-Asian Peoples Solidarity Conference, Moscow: Foreign Languages Publishing House, 1958
