= Bahia Rachedi =

Algerian actress

- بهية راشدي
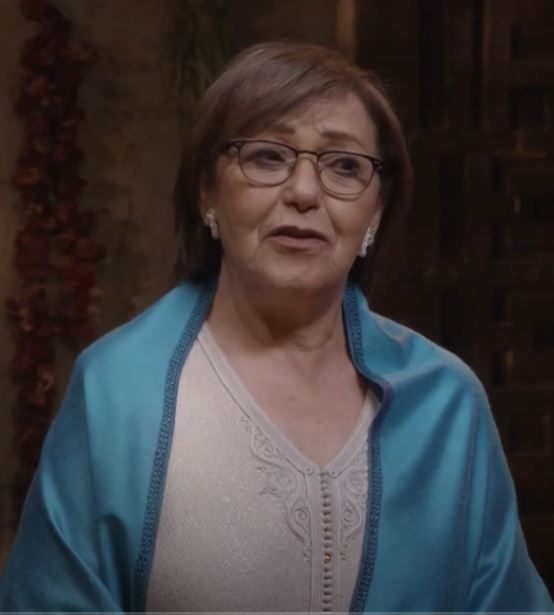
- Rachedi in 2021
- Born: 25 September 1948 (age 77); Mitidja, Algeria
- Occupation: Actress
- Years active: 1970s- present

Bahia Rachedi (Arabic: بهية راشدي; born 25 September 1948 in Mitidja, Algeria) is an Algerian actress. She has appeared in many plays, films and television series since the early 1970s. In 2005, she won the Best Arab Actress award at the International Festival of Carthage.

== Filmography ==
=== Cinema ===
- 1992: Deux Femmes
- 2002: Rachida
- 2005: Douar de femmes
- 2014: Sun doors: Algeria forever
- 2014: Krim Belkacem
- 2017: Les sept remparts de la citadelle
- 2019: Augustine: Son of Her Tears

=== Television ===
- 1999: Bin El barah quel youm
- 2003: Hanane imraa
- 2004: The Player
- 2005: Mouftereq El-Toroq : Zineb
- 2006: Chahra
- 2006: Wahiba
- 2015: Hob Fi Kafas El Itiham
- 2016: Qoloub Tahta Ramad
- 2017: Bibiche et Bibicha
- 2021: Sultan Achour 10
