= Blonde dans la Casbah =

Studio album by Biyouna
- Released: 10 October 2006
- Recorded: 2006
- Studio: Studio Calm (Paris); L'Atelier (Nice)
- Genre: Pop; raï; rock; jazz
- Length: 46:50
- Label: Naïve
- Producer: Benjamin Constant; Christophe Dupouy; Joseph Racaille; Djamel Laroussi

Singles from Blonde Platine dans la Casbah
- 1. "Taali" Released: 7 October 2006; 2. "Une Blonde Platine dans la Casbah" Released: 13 January 2007; 3. "Demain tu te maries" Released: 16 April 2007; 4. "Merci pour tout (c'que j'n'ai pas)" Released: 17 August 2007; 5. "Tsaabli ouetmili" Released: 5 December 2007

Blonde dans la Casbah is Biyouna's second album, released in January 2007. Its most prominent song is single Une Blonde Platine dans la Casbah, a song dedicated to Biyouna's mother, which has since gone to number one in several countries.

== About the album ==
With Blonde dans la Casbah, produced by composer Joseph Racaille, the actress-singer's second album is a cabaret, served by arrangements with delicate inlays piano, violin and brass, guitar and mandolin. The album features duets with singer Christophe ("La Man"), the Malawian jazz singer Malia ("Bismilah"), Didier Wampas ("Merci pour tout"), and covers of the classics made famous by El Hachemi Guerouabi ("El Barah"), and Kamel Messaoudi ("Echemaa"). For "Tomorrow you get married" again, a pop hit of Patricia Carli in the sixties that Biyouna wished to cover. Special mention also for the mixes "Bismillahi", "La Man" and "Une Blonde Platine dans la Casbah," which gave its name to the album, a tribute to her mother and accomplice to the artist who died the year before the album at the age of 84. "Tsaabli ouetmili" is a tribute to Algerian singer Fadela Dzirya and "El Ghafel" a composition by Djamel Laroussi.

== Concerts and singles ==
Born of a sudden idea by Olivier Gluzman - now Biyouna's agent having sought her out in Algiers - Blonde dans la Casbah was released October 17 by Naïve. With backing including Henri Agnel (guitars) and Mustapha Mataoui (piano), Biyouna gave the premiere in Paris on stage in a series of concerts at Le Divan du Monde. In 2007 Biyouna performed the tracks in concerts in Algeria, Belgium, Canada, France, Germany, Switzerland, and the United Kingdom. In 2008 the songs were performed in North America, where Une Blonde Platine dans la Casbah, Ta'ali and Tsaabli ouetmili were well received.

== Track listing ==
1. "Ta'ali" – 4:36 - (تعالي) "come [my gazelle]" sung in Arabic, Mohamed Hamel/Mohamed Igerbouchene
2. "Une Blonde Platine dans la Casbah" – 3:20 - sung in French, Jacques Duvall/Joseph Racaille
3. "Demain tu te maries" – 4:25 - sung in French, song of Patricia Carli/Léo Missir
4. "El Ghafel" – 2:55 - "the naive boy" sung in Arabic, Rabah Zerradine/Djamel Laroussi
5. "Les coyotes" – 3:18 - sung in French, Jacques Duvall/Joseph Racaille
6. "Tsaabli ouetmili" – 3:31 - sung in Arabic, traditional arranged by Joseph Racaille
7. "Merci pour tout (c'que j'n'ai pas)" featuring Didier Wampas – 3:22 sung in French, Jacques Duvall/Joseph Racaille
8. "Echemaa" - 5:46 (الشمعة) "the candle" sung in Arabic, song of Yacine Ouabed
9. "Bismilah" duet with Malia – 5:38 "Elle s'est perdue... Bismilah! Dieu soit loué!" sung in French, Philippe Latger/Joseph Racaille
10. "El Bareh" – 5:03 sung in Arabic, fr:Mahboub Bati (1919-2000), famous as song of El Hachemi Guerouabi
11. "La man" with the participation of Christophe – 4:15 sung in French, Marie Möör/Christophe

== Charts ==
Chart (2007)	Peak position
Algeria Albums Chart	1
Arabic Albums Chart	7
Belgian Flandres Albums Chart	2
Canada Albums Chart	25
Europe Albums Chart	13
France Albums Chart	1
Germany Albums Chart	28
Hungary Albums Chart	16
Mexico Albums Chart	27
Morocco Albums Chart	1
Netherlands Albums Chart	11
Switzerland Albums Chart	2
Billboard Türkiye	7
UK Albums Chart	68
US Billboard 200	121
