= 87th African Infantry Division =

WW2 formation of the French Army

- Active: 2 September 1939 – Summer 1940
- Country: France
- Branch: French Army
- Type: Colonial troops
- Role: Infantry
- Size: Division of 3 infantry and 2 artillery Regiments
- Part of: 24th Corps, 7th Army
- Engagements: Battle of France (1940)

Commanders
- Notable commanders: Henry Martin

The 87th African Infantry Division (French: 87^{e} division d'infanterie d'Afrique, 87^{e} DIA) was a formation of the French Army in the Second World War. It was formed in French Algeria on 2 September 1939, the day after the start of the war. The division was transferred to Metropolitan France by the end of the year. The 87th African Infantry Division deployed to the Sarre front as part of the 24th Corps of the 7th Army. The 87th African Infantry Division defended the Ailette Canal during the Battle of the Ailette before withdrawing southwards. It remained in good order and fought until the armistice of 22 June 1940, after which it was withdrawn to North Africa where it disbanded.

== Service history ==
The 87th African Infantry Division was formed in the French 10th Military Region in French North Africa in 1939. Troops were assembled at Constantine, Blida, Miliana, Orléansville (modern-day Chlef), Maison Carrée (modern day El Harrach), Tizi Ouzou, Sétif, Bougie (modern-day Béjaïa) and Guelma in French Algeria. The division formed on 2 September, the day after the start of the Second World War, and the troops were brought together in French Tunisia. Over the next three months the division, together with a brigade of Spahis, were transferred to Metropolitan France. During the Phoney War the 87th African Infantry Division took the position of the 14th Infantry Division at the Sarre front. On 1 March 1940 the division was stationed at Mulcey and Lhor in Moselle.

By May 1940 the 87th African Infantry Division consisted of the 9th Zouaves Regiment, the 17th and 18th Algerian Tirailleurs Regiments, 87th African Artillery Regiment, 297th Heavy Artillery Regiment and the 87th Reconnaissance Group. The division was commanded by General Henry Martin. The 87th African Infantry Division formed part of General François Fougère's 24th Corps in General Aubert Frère's 7th Army.

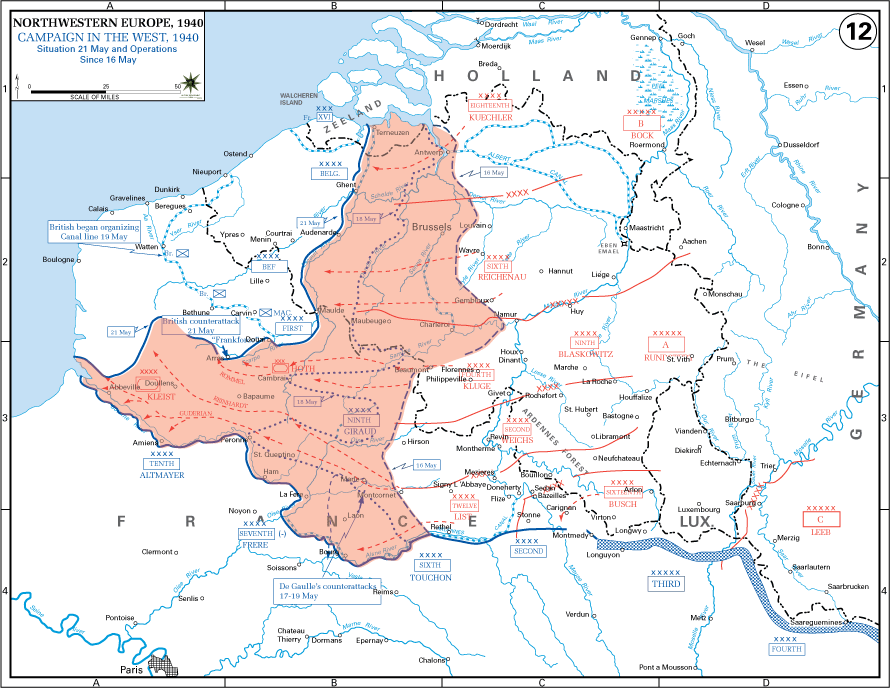
Battle of France, Allied withdrawals of 16-21 May

The unit was engaged in the May-June Battle of France and was one of the units which remained in good order and fought until the signing of the armistice of 22 June 1940. From 14 to 22 May the unit fought actions while withdrawing through Reims, Laon, La Fère, Coucy-la-Ville, Soissons, Villers-Cotterêts, Lévignen, Neuilly-en-Thelle, Sandricourt near Méru, Compiegne and Morsan. During the defence of the Ailette Canal near Soissons, in the Battle of the Ailette the division held up the German advance for a while, inflicting casualties of 1,800 dead, 4,500 wounded and 300 captured on the German forces. Between 23 May and 25 June the division retreated through Saint-Quentin-sur-Allan (near La Ferté-Milon), Dammartin-en-Goële and the Meaux forest.

After the armistice the 87th African Infantry Division moved southwards via Châtillon-sur-Indre, Ardentes, Étrechet and Neuvy-Pailloux where it regrouped. The division was afterwards shipped to Algiers and disbanded. The archaeologist André Berthier served in the division in the Battle of France and returned to North Africa in August 1940.
