= 6th Dragoon Regiment (France) =

French dragoon regiment (1673–1992)

- 6e Régiment de Dragons
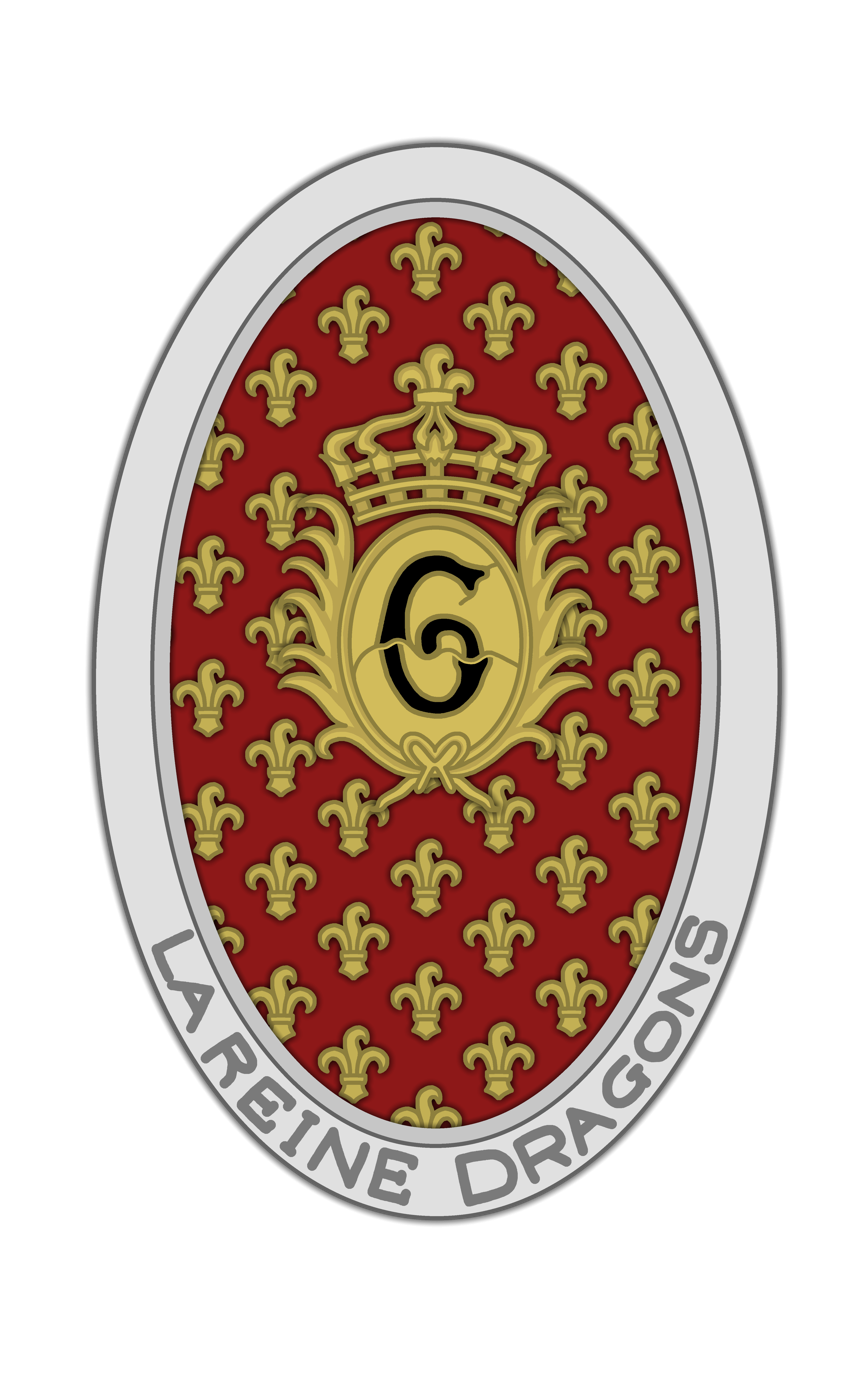
- Unit Insignia
- Active: September 14, 1673 – 1992
- Country: France
- Type: Dragoon
- Size: Regiment
- Engagements: French Revolutionary Wars; Napoleonic Wars; World War I World War II; Cold War

The 6th Regiment of Dragoons (6e Régiment de Dragons) is a French regiment of dragoon cavalry formed under the old regime, and dissolved in 1992.

== Creation and renames ==
September 14, 1673: Creation as the Régiment d'Hocquincourt (Regiment of Hocquincourt)

- 1675: Renamed to Régiment de Dragons de la Reine (Dragoons of the Queen)
- 1791: Renamed to 6e Régiment de Dragons (6th Regiment of Dragoons)
- 1814: Renamed to Régiment de Dragons de Monsieur (Dragoons of Gentlemen)
- 1815: Renamed back to 6e Régiment de Dragons, dissolved after the Hundred Days
- 1815: Recreated as Régiment de Dragons de la Loire (Dragoons of the Loire)
- 1825: Renamed to 6e régiment de dragons
- 1940: Dissolved
- 1951: Recreated as 6e régiment de dragons
- 1963: Dissolved
- 1964: Recreated as 6e régiment de dragons out of the 3e Algerian Spahis Regiment
- 1992: Final dissolution

== Regimental Leaders ==
Until the French Revolution, the regimental leader were called mestre de camp, who owned the regiment they commanded. Beginning in 1791, the leader was referred to as a colonel. In reality, only the first dragoon regiment leader had this quality, his followers, being only mestre de camp-lieutenant, corresponding afterwards to lieutenant colonel.

- 1673: Gabriel de Monchy
- 1675: Mestre de Camp de Brizay, Viscount of Enonville
- 1685: Mestre de Camp Nicolaï, Knight of Murçay
- 1692: Mestre de Camp Texier, Marquis of Hautefeuille
- 1704: Mestre de Camp Riencourt, Marquis of Orival
- 1731: Mestre de Camp Lamber of Herbigny, Marquis of Thibouville
- 1734: Mestre de Camp Chabannes, Marquis of Chabannes-Pionsac
- 1740: Mestre de Camp Durey of Sauroy, Marquis of Terrail
- 1748: Mestre de Camp Charles, Marquis of Morand
- 1762: Mestre de Camp Grossoles, Earl of Flammarens
- 1780: Mestre de Camp Franquetot, Knight of Coigny
- 1784: Mestre de Camp Grammont, Duke of Guiche
- 1788: Mestre de Camp Machault, Viscount of Machault
- 1791: Colonel Louis-Marthe of Gouy d'Arsy
- 1792: Colonel Marc Pierre de la Turmeliere
- 1792: Colonel Blaise Duval "Duval de Hautmaret"
- 1792: Colonel Adelaïde Blaise François "le Hare de la Grange"
- 1792: Colonel Jacques Louis François Delaistre de Tilly
- 1793: Chef de Brigade François Philibert Michel Pelicot
- 1794: Chef de Brigade François Jourdan
- 1794: Chef de Brigade Vincent
- 1794: Chef de Brigade Jean-Louis-François Fauconnet
- 1797: Chef de Brigade Jacques le Baron (Colonel in 1803)
- 1807: Colonel Cyrille-Simon Picquet
- 1809: Colonel Pierre Alexis de Pinteville
- 1813: Colonel Claude Mugnier
- 1814: Colonel Jean-Baptiste Saviot
- 1815: Colonel Dornier
- 1823: Colonel Podenas
- 1830: Colonel Lacour
- 1834: Colonel Scherer
- 1845: Colonel Beltramin
- 1852: Colonel Robinet des Plas
- 1855: Colonel Jean Jacques Paul Félix Ressayre
- 1863: Colonel Bourboulon
- 1869: Colonel Tillion
- 1870: Colonel Fombert de Villiers
- 1876: Colonel Maréchal
- 1881: Colonel Rapp
- 1887: Colonel Brossier de Buros
- 1893: Colonel of Lestapis
- 1898: Colonel of Sesmaisons
- 1899: Colonel Faure
- 1908: Colonel Trafford
- 1912: Colonel Champeaux
- 1914: Colonel of Champvallier
- 1918: Colonel Joannard
- 1925: Colonel Yvart
- 1931: Colonel Barbe
- 1933: Colonel of the Perrier de Larsan
- 1936: Colonel Jacottet
- 1951: Colonel of Soultrait
- 1953: Colonel Ameil
- 1956: Colonel Renoult
- 1958: Lieutenant-Colonel Bonnefous
- 1961: Lieutenant-Colonel Boileau
- 1963: Lieutenant-Colonel Jeannerod
- 1964: Lieutenant-Colonel le Diberder
- 1967: Colonel Fournier
- 1969: Lieutenant-Colonel O'Delant
- 1971: Lieutenant-Colonel Maillard
- 1972: Lieutenant-Colonel Carabin
- 1974: Colonel Delcourt
- 1976: Colonel of Cotton
- 1978: Colonel Thiébaut
- 1980: Colonel Burel
- 1982: Colonel Winckel
- 1984: Colonel Cailloux
- 1986: Colonel Lefebvre
- 1990: Colonel Françon
- 1991: Lieutenant-Colonel Riediner

=== Regimental leaders killed or injured in combat ===
- July 23, 1675: Knight of Hocquincourt (Killed)
- August 4, 1692: Knight of Murçay (Killed)
- April 26, 1794: Chef de Brigade Vincent (Killed)
- February 6, 1807: Colonel Lebaron (Killed)
- July 22, 1812: Colonel Picquet (Wounded)

== Garrisons ==
In March 1788, the Régiment de Dragons de la Reine moved to Laon in a newly built barracks, which, as new as it was, is assigned to it a merry-go-round, a quarry, and even a hospital. Dragoons are sworn to the nation and the King and Queen in August 1789. Becoming the 6e Régiment de Dragons early in 1792 and this time, after swearing loyalty to the nation, the law, administrators of the executive, to maintain the Constitution with all its strength, never to abandon its guiding principles, to observe the rules of discipline and to live free or to die, the regiment nevertheless left the city the following year for the campaigns of the French Revolution and the French Empire. Laon was later destroyed by bombing during World War I, only a pediment inscribed on historic monuments remains. From the end of the empire in 1815 until the Franco-Prussian War, the regiment was mobile throughout the metropolitan territory and changed garrison almost every two years. After the fall of the empire, the regiment was dissolved while garrisoned at Nîmes. It was reformed in 1816 in Haute-Saône under the name of Régiment de Dragons de la Loire. Before renaming back to the 6e Régiment de Dragons in 1825, the regiment was moved from Nancy, Charleville, Saint-Omer, Lille, and Verdun. It then passed through Lyon, Tours, Pontivy, Valenciennes, and Paris, where it took part in the riots of June 1832. It was continued to be moved through Dax, Limoges, Poitiers, Fonatinebleau, Sedan, Chalon-sur-Marne, Limoges, and Toul. In 1853, before leaving for the Crimea, it was stationed in Tarascon. After that, they were moved to Clermont-Ferran, back to Paris, Saint-Mihiel, Valenciennes, Lunéville, and Lyon. In 1870, the regiment was in Libourne, where they were at for a short time and then returned to Lyon. From this period, stability was established. From 1872 to 1880, the regiment was in Chambéry, where it had already been in between 1867 and 1869, where it concurred

== World War I ==
On August 1, 1914, the general mobilization of the French armies was decreed. The previous evening, the 6th Dragoons garrisoned in Vincennes, received orders to embark and take up their positions.

The regiment's order of battle was then constituted as follows: It took part in the Battle of the Yser.

It took part in the Third Battle of the Aisne.

== World War II ==
It was dissolved in 1940.

== The Cold War ==
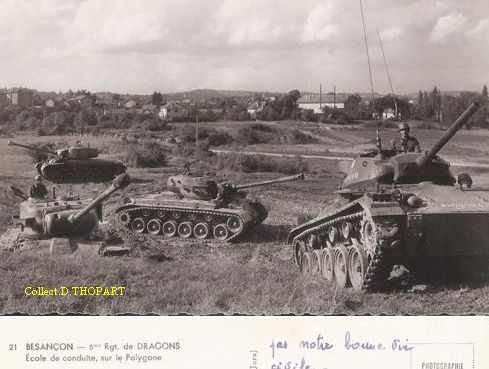
Postcard of M24 Chaffee and M26 Pershing tanks of the 6th Dragoons of Besançon in 1955.

It was raised again as the 6th Dragoon Regiment in 1964 out of the 3e Régiment de Spahis Algériens. It was dissolved in 1992.

== Honours ==
=== Battle honours ===
- Marengo 1800
- Austerlitz 1806
- Friedland 1807
- Kanghil 1855
- L’Yser 1914
- Picardie 1918

=== Decorations ===
- Croix de guerre 1914–1918 with 1 palm
- Croix de guerre 1939–1945 with 1 palm
