= Sultan Achour 10 =

Algerian television series

- Also known as: As-Sulṭān ‘Āshūr al-‘Āshir
- arabic: السلطان عاشور العاشر
- Genre: Comedy; Drama
- Written by: Djaafar Gacem; Chafik Berkani
- Screenplay by: Djaffar Gacem; Chafik berkani Chemseddine Amrani(season1); Samir Ziane(season1)
- Directed by: Djaafar Gacem
- Starring: Salah Aougrout; Hakim Zelloum; Sid Ahmed Agoumi; Madani Naamoun; Yasmine Ammari; Othmane Ben Daoud; Mohammed Yabadra; Souhila Mâallem; Blaha Ben Ziane; Azzeddine Bouchaib; Zakaria Kerouat; Nadia Kounda; Merouane Guerouabi
- Opening theme: Smaïl ben Houhou; Mouh Sghir
- Composer: Ridha Mourah
- Country of origin: Algeria
- Original language: Arabic
- No. of seasons: 3
- No. of episodes: 66

Production
- Executive producer: Meriem Meftahi
- Production locations: Tunisia; Algeria (Season 3)
- Camera setup: Bouguerra Amine
- Running time: 20 - 30 minutes
- Production companies: Prod Art Films; Karavan Films (Season 3)

Original release
- Network: Echorouk TV (Seasons 1 and 2); ENTV1 – ENTV6 (Season 3)
- Release: June 18, 2015 – May 9, 2021

Related
- Cousinet Ashour

Sultan Ashour 10 (in Arabic: السّلطان عاشور العاشر, As-Sulṭān ‘Āshūr al-‘Āshir) is an Algerian television series, directed by Djafar Gacem and broadcast by Echorouk TV for the two first seasons and ENTV for the third season.

== Series overview ==
Season	No. of episodes	Originally broadcast (algeria)	
Season	No. of episodes	Series premiere	Series finale
1	20	18 June 2015	7 July 2015
2	23	27 May 2017	18 June 2017
3	23	13 April 2021	9 May 2021

== Cast ==
=== Main ===
- Salah Aougrout as Sultan Ashour 10 (seasons 1 and 2)
- Hakim Zelloum as Sultan Ashour 10 (season 3)
- Sid Ahmed Agoumi as Minister Qandil
- Naamoun Madani as Bourhan
- Yasmine Ammari as Sultana Razane
- Souhila Mallem as Princess Abla
- Nadia Kounda as Manina
- Kamal Abdatt as King Mokranus
- Othmane Ben Daoud as King Dahmanuse
- Mohammed Yabdri as General Fares
- Blaha Ben Ziane as Nouri
- Kawther El Bardi as Nouria
- Ahmed zitouni as Prince Lokmane
- Mohamed Mrad as Djawed (seasons 1 and 2)
- Zakaria Karaouet as Djawed (season 3)
- Nadia Alahoum as Morjana
- Taous Claire Khazem as Maria
- Tir El Hadi as Baji
- Azzeddine Bouchaib as Belouta
- Merouane Guerouabi as El Hachemi
- Ahmed Meddah as Cheddad

== Plot ==
=== Season 1 ===
Before he died, the "Sultan Boualem" decided to select his successor from his two children: the "El amir Kamel" and the "El amir Ashour". Finally, he chooses "Ashour", which provokes the anger of "Kamel" who decides to leave the kingdom, and after several years of governance by "Sultan Ashour", the kingdom takes its name and becomes "Kingdom Ashouriya".

=== Season 2 ===
Ashour Tenth discovers in the second part that his brother Kamal, who Ashour had been waiting for 40 years, was killed by Al-Baji who threatened to kill his daughter by the "minister Qandil". However, he was buried in the grave of his father, Boualam IX, so a lamp that installed Ashour Sultan was because Kamal was not yielding to his demands like Ashour, and Kamal fled that night and the minister met him as a lamp. There was no solution for the prince except to strike him with a sword, as a result of this his eyes were wounded. After a long time, Prince Kamal returned to his wife and son. One day, Al-Baji and his men killed him, accompanied by his wife, but he pitied his young son, who is Jawad, who is the legitimate authority. When Alman Ashour did this, Minister Kandil was imprisoned and granted to Jawad the authority when he returned from death, that is, the plot that the minister laid for him, but Jawad did not take the authority to his pity on Ashour, proving to him that he was the authority of everyone on condition To marry him to his cousin, Princess Abla, whom Bniban is asking to marry, so he gave it to her.

== Production ==
=== Setup ===
At a time when low prices have affected the economic life of the country, Algerian TV has revised its expenditures for Ramadan 2015. He refused to spend the 14 billion centimes requested by the director Djafar Gacem. After that, Echorouk TV covered his financial expenses, as he earned more than 18 billion centimeters. Introduction from the mobile operator Ooredoo (14 billion centimeters), and Cevital The text took 8 months to complete, accompanied by three books.

=== Photography ===
The series was filmed in (Tunisia), in studios Tariq Bin Ammar, the same filming studios Day of the Falcon , Which contains all the materials and all decors that fit the nature of the chain. Filming of a series started in January 2015 and continued for 3 months. "The crew faced many difficulties due to the cold and the rain," according to Salah Aougrout, the lead actor in the series.

== See also ==
- Echorouk TV
- Bouzid Days
