= Rendezvous with Destiny (TV series) =

- Genre: Drama, Action
- Written by: Karim Khadim, Djaafar Gacem
- Starring: Othmane Ben Daoud; Sid Ahmed Agoumi; Malika Belbey; Sofia Kouninaf; Azzedine Bouragheda; Karim Zenasni
- Country of origin: Algeria
- Original language: Arabic
- No. of seasons: 1
- No. of episodes: 30

Production
- Running time: 30 min

Original release
- Network: Télévision Algérienne
- Release: October 2007 – November 2007

Related
- Nass Mlah City; El Badra

Rendezvous With Destiny (Arabic: موعد مع القدر, Mawid Maa El Qadar) is an Algerian television series, produced and broadcast by Télévision Algérienne, directed by Djaafar Gacem, written by Karim Khadim and Djaafar Gacem. It debuted in October 2007 on Télévision Algérienne, A3 and Canal Algérie, and ended in November 2007.

== Cast ==
- Othmane Ben Daoud as Malek Bachiri
- Sid Ahmed Agoumi as L'Inspecteur Allal
- Malika Belbey as Hanane Belhachemi
- Sofia Kouninaf as Feriel Bachiri
- Azzedine Bouragheda as Merouane
- Karim Zenasni as Smaïl
- Boualem Bennani
- Larbi Zekkal as The father of Feriel
- Imane Nawel
- Aïda Kechoud
- Abdelkrim Briber
- Fatiha Soltan
- Faiza Ghazi
- Samira Sahraoui
- Ikram Mouak
- Nassim Zaidi
- Ahmed Manssef Abou Chenane
- Djamel Bounab
- Zahia Mekhlouf
- Mouna Adda
- Abdelaziz Guerda
- Zineb Arras
- Wahid Nader
- Mohamed Laawadi
- Rabeh Laacha
- Zaki
- Ania
- Hamid Mesbah
- Sid Ali Ben Tchikou
- Zohir Kacem
- El-Hadi Mellouli
- Hafida Ben Diaf
- Razika Farhane
- Hamid Amirouche
- Djamel Hammouda
- Hassan Ben Jedou
- Kheira Bakhti
- Biyouna
- Amel Wahbi
- Cherif Tiabi

== Series overview ==
Country	Title	Language	Channel	Originally aired	
Country	Title	Language	Channel	First aired	Last aired
Algeria	موعد مع القدر (Mawid Maa El Qadar)	Algerian Arabic	Télévision Algérienne	October 2007	November 2007
Algeria	موعد مع القدر (Mawid Maa El Qadar)	Algerian Arabic	A3	October 2007	November 2007
Algeria	موعد مع القدر (Mawid Maa El Qadar)	Algerian Arabic	Canal Algérie	October 2007	November 2007
