= The Player (Algerian TV series) =

- Genre: Drama
- Written by: Djamel Fazaz
- Starring: Mohammed Adjaimi; Fatiha Berber; Farida Krim; Samir Abdoun; Asma Djermoune
- Country of origin: Algeria
- Original language: Arabic
- No. of seasons: 1
- No. of episodes: 30

Production
- Producer: Télévision Algérienne
- Running time: 35 min
- Production company: Star Production

Original release
- Network: Télévision Algérienne
- Release: 15 October – 14 November 2004

The Player (Arabic: اللاعب, Al-laib) is an Algerian television series, produced and broadcast by Télévision Algérienne, directed and written by Djamel Fazaz. It premiered in October 2004 on Télévision Algérienne, A3 and Canal Algérie.

It stars Mohammed Adjaimi, Fatiha Berber, Samir Abdoun and Asma Djermoune in the main role.

== Cast ==
- Mohammed Adjaimi as Si Authmane
- Fatiha Berber
- Nawal Zaatar
- Farida Krim
- Nassima
- Samir Abdoun as Reda
- Asma Djermoune as Sabrina
- Abd Al-krim Briber
- Nawal Zmit
- Malika Belbey
- Lamia Bouskin
- Sid Ali Kouiret
- Bahia Rachedi

== Series overview ==
Country	Title	Language	Channel	Originally aired	
Country	Title	Language	Channel	First aired	Last aired
Algeria	اللاعب (Al laib)	Algerian Arabic	Télévision Algérienne	October 15, 2004	November 14, 2004
Algeria	اللاعب (Al laib)	Algerian Arabic	A3	October 15, 2004	November 14, 2004
Algeria	اللاعب (Al laib)	Algerian Arabic	Canal Algérie	October 15, 2004	November 14, 2004
