= Barakat! =

- Directed by: Djamila Sahraoui
- Written by: Djamila Sahraoui; Cécile Vargaftig
- Produced by: Richard Copans
- Starring: Rachida Brakni
- Cinematography: Katell Djian
- Edited by: Catherine Gouze
- Music by: Alla
- Distributed by: Pierre Grise Distribution
- Release date: 16 February 2006
- Running time: 95 minutes
- Countries: Algeria; France
- Languages: French, Arabic

Barakat! ("Enough!") is a 2006 French/Algerian drama film directed by Djamila Sahraoui. It premiered at the Berlin International Film Festival on 16 February 2006.

== Plot ==
During the Algerian Civil War, Amel (Rachida Brakni) is a doctor who, on returning home from work one day, discovers that her journalist husband has gone missing. Receiving no help from the authorities, she decides to look for him herself. She is helped by another woman, Khadidja.

== Cast ==
- Rachida Brakni as Amel
- Fattouma Ousliha Bouamari as Khadidja
- Zahir Bouzerar as Le vieil homme
- Malika Belbey as Nadia
- Amine Kedam as Bilal
- Ahmed Berrhama as Karim
- Abdelbacet Benkhalifa as L'homme du barrage
- Abdelkrim Beriber as Le policier
- Ahmed Benaissa as Homme accueil hôpital
- Mohamed Bouamari as Hadj Slimane

== Awards ==
At the 2007 Panafrican Film and Television Festival of Ouagadougou, Barakat! won the Oumarou Ganda Award for the Best First Work, the award for Best Music and the award for Best Screenplay. It also won the prize for Best Arab Film at the third Dubai International Film Festival.
