= Djamila Sahraoui =

Algerian filmmaker (born 1950)

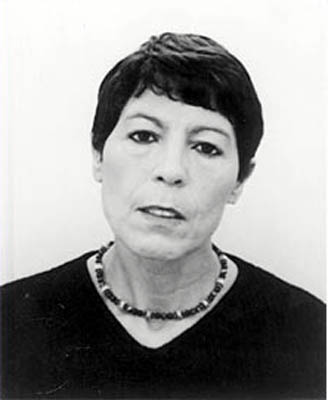
- Sahraoui in 2015
- Born: 1950 (age 75–76); Algiers, Algeria
- Education: IDHEC (Institut des hautes études cinématographiques)
- Occupation: Filmmaker
- Notable work: Barakat!

Djamila Sahraoui (born 1950) is an Algerian filmmaker.

Djamila Sahraoui was born in Algiers on 23 October 1950. She studied literature before attending the renowned Parisian film school IDHEC (Institut des hautes études cinématographiques), specialising in scriptwriting and direction. Sahraoui moved to France in 1975 where she began her career as a documentary filmmaker. She made her first short film, Houria in 1980, then worked as an editor and assistant, before going on to make her own documentaries from the 1990s. Her 1995 documentary, La moitié du ciel d'Allah, featured interviews with Algerian women about work and their struggles for equality and freedom. In 1997, she was named the laureate of la Villa Medicis due to her success. While Sahraoui is best known for her documentaries, she has also achieved success with her fiction films Barakat! (2006) and Yema (2013).

== Films ==
=== Short films ===
- Houria (1980), 26 min.

=== Documentaries ===
- Avoir 2000 ans dans les Aurès (1990), 26 min.
- Prénom Marianne (1992), 26 min.
- La moitié du ciel d'Allah (1995), 52 min.
- Algérie, la vie quand même (1999), 52 min.
- Opération Télé-cités (2000), 26 min.
- Algérie, la vie toujours (2001), 53 min.
- Et les arbres poussent en Kabylie (2003), 85 min.

=== Fiction films ===
- Barakat! (2006)
- Yema (2012)
