= Raymond Duval =

French general

Général d'armée Raymond Duval
- Born: 19 September 1894; Montpellier, France
- Died: 22 August 1955 (aged 60) near Kasba Tadla, Morocco
- Military career
- Allegiance: France; Vichy France; Free France
- Service: French Army; Free French Army
- Service years: 1914–1955
- Rank: Général d'armée
- Commands: 159th Alpine Infantry Regiment; 3rd Algerian Infantry Division; Constantine departement; Supreme commander of troops in Tunisia; Supreme commander of troops in Morocco
- Conflicts: World War I; Battle of the Frontiers; First Battle of the Marne; First Battle of Champagne; Second Battle of Champagne; Battle of Verdun; Battle of the Somme; Allied intervention in the Russian Civil War; High Atlas campaign; World War II; Battle of France; Italian Campaign of World War II; Operation Dragoon; Vosges campaign; Liberation of Siena; Sétif insurrection
- Awards: Grand Cross of the Legion of Honour

Raymond Francis Duval (19 September 1894 – 22 August 1955) was a French general who participated in both World War I and World War II and was supreme commander of French troops in Tunisia and Morocco. During his career, he brutally suppressed the insurrection at Sétif, Algeria in May 1945, resulting in the massacre of 6,000 to 45,000 Algerians.

== Biography ==
=== Early life ===
Duval was born in Montpellier, France, on 19 September 1894, the son of a military officer. As a child, he studied at the Prytanée National Militaire, a military school in La Flèche. He entered the French military academy at Saint-Cyr in 1912 and graduated as a sous-lieutenant (second lieutenant) on 2 August 1914, the day before France entered World War I.

=== World War I ===
France and Germany exchanged declarations of war on 3 August 1914 as World War I began. At the outset of the war, Duval participated in the Battle of the Frontiers, and was taken prisoner by German forces at Maubeuge on 7 September 1914. He escaped on 13 September 1914 and joined the 9th Zouave Regiment, with which he spent the rest of the war. He participated in the First Battle of the Marne in September 1914, and was seriously wounded on 16 September 1914. For his actions, he was made a Knight of the Legion of Honour at the age of 20 on 15 November 1914.

After several months of hospital care, he returned to the front and participated in the First Battle of Champagne (20 December 1914 – 17 March 1915), the Second Battle of Champagne (25 September–6 November 1915), and the early stages of the Battle of Verdun, which began in February 1916. He was promoted to capitaine (captain) on 18 May 1916 and participated in the Battle of the Somme (1 July–18 November 1916), during which he was taken prisoner on 15 November 1916 in Saint-Pierre-Waast. While a prisoner of war, he made three unsuccessful escape attempts. He finally succeeded in escaping on his fourth attempt on 16 October 1918, less than a month before the end of the war.

=== Interwar period ===
After World War I ended, Duval participated in the Allied intervention in the Russian Civil War, serving in Siberia with the mission of General Maurice Janin until 20 June 1920. He served in Syria in 1921, then joined the 27th Chasseurs Alpins Battalion in Annecy in 1922. He studied at the École supérieure de guerre (French war college) from 1924 to 1926, then was assigned in 1926 to the staff of the 19th Army Corps in Algiers, his first assignment in Algeria. He married on 1 June 1927. He was promoted to commandant on 25 December 1932. Transferred to Fez in French Morocco, he participated in the High Atlas campaign at the end of the pacification of Morocco. From 1933 to 1935, he was deputy head of the resident general's cabinet in French Morocco. From 1935 to 1939, he was on the general staff and supreme commander of troops in French Morocco.

=== World War II ===
World War II broke out in September 1939. Promoted to lieutenant colonel in December 1939, Duval was transferred to Metz to serve on the Maginot Line with the 3rd Army. During the Battle of France, he was taken prisoner along with the general staff by the Germans on 22 June 1940, the day France surrendered to Germany. He escaped to Vichy France soon after.

Serving in the army of Vichy France, Duval was promoted to colonel on 25 September 1941, and left for Ankara as a military attaché in Turkey. Upon his return to France in October 1942, he took command of the 159th Alpine Infantry Regiment in Grenoble. After the German invasion of the unoccupied zone of France in November 1942, he entered the French Resistance. He escaped from France with General Alphonse Joseph Georges by plane on 20 May 1943 and joined the Free French forces. After various commands in French North Africa, he was transferred in May 1944 to the French Expeditionary Corps in Italy as commander of the divisional infantry of the 3rd Algerian Infantry Division, and during that tour of duty was promoted to général de brigade on 25 June 1944. He liberated Siena in July 1944 while in command of the division. Landing in Provence in Operation Dragoon — the Allied invasion of southern France — in August 1944 with the French 1st Army, he advanced up the Rhône with his troops. He entered combat in the Vosges in December 1944.

=== Setif insurrection ===
On 8 March 1945, Duval was transferred to Algeria to serve as commander of the Constantine departement there. On 8 May 1945, the day Germany surrendered to the Allies, bringing World War II to an end in Europe, riots began in Sétif, west of Constantine, and native Algerians began killing French settlers in the surrounding countryside of Sétif Province. Unrest also occurred in Guelma Province. In response, Duval carried out very harsh and controversial policing operations that became known as the Sétif and Guelma massacre. In a secret report to his commander General Henry Martin, Duval said he'd bought time for the colonial government, but that they could not keep using brute force to suppress Algerian nationalists. Without reforms being enacted, Duval warned that not only Algerians would likely rise up in the future, they might triumph next time.

"I have secured you peace for 10 years. If France does nothing, it will all happen again, only next time it will be worse and may well be irreparable."

=== Later career ===
In November 1945, General Charles de Gaulle appointed Duval supreme commander of French troops in Tunisia. He served in that capacity until 1949, and was promoted to général de division on 20 August 1946. From 1949 to 1955, he was supreme commander of French troops in Morocco, and he was promoted to général de corps d'armée on 7 February 1951 and then to général d'armée on 1 August 1954. He was awarded the Grand Cross of the Legion of Honor on 6 August 1955.

On 22 August 1955, while he was carrying out operations to maintain order after riots in Oued Zem and Khénifra in French Morocco, Duval died when his plane, which he flew himself, crashed near Kasba Tadla in the foothills of the Moroccan Atlas Mountains. By a ministerial decision of 20 September 1955, he was declared to have "died for France."

== Awards and honors ==
- Knight of the Legion of Honour
- Grand Cross of the Legion of Honour

== Bibliography ==
- Annie Rey-Goldzeiguer, Aux origines de la guerre d'Algérie 1940-45, éditions La Découverte, 2002, pp. 330–334 (in French).
