= François Sevez =

French general

François Sevez (22 October 1891 – 29 February 1948) was a French general during World War II. Sevez was present at the German surrender in Reims, and signed the German Instrument of Surrender as the official witness.

== Military career ==
At the end of the First World War Sevez had attained the rank of captain, and received the Légion d'honneur in 1918 after being wounded seven times.

During the early part of the Second World War, he fought in Belgium. Captured and held prisoner, he was repatriated in 1941 and was named the Chief of Staff to General Juin. He fought in the Tunisian campaign as a brigadier general in 1942, and took command of the 4th Moroccan Mountain Division in September 1943, participating in the Italian campaign as well as the liberation of Alsace in 1944. In October 1944, he joined General de Monsabert as a commander of the French Army reserve destined to occupy Germany.

In Reims, on 7 May 1945, acting in his capacity as deputy to General Alphonse Juin, he signed the German Instrument of Surrender as the official witness, in the presence of General Alfred Jodl and General Walter B. Smith, the chief of staff of U.S. General Dwight D. Eisenhower.

== Death ==
Sevez died following a hunting accident near Offenburg, hit by another hunter's bullet that had ricocheted off the thick skin of a wild boar. He was buried temporarily in a chapel in Baden-Baden.
