= Héliopolis (2021 film) =

2021 film

- Poster
- Directed by: Djafar Gacem
- Written by: Salah Eddine Chihani; Kahina Mohamed Oussaid; Djafar Gacem
- Release date: 2021
- Country: Algeria
- Languages: Algerian Arabic; French

Héliopolis (Arabic: هليوبوليس, romanized: Haliyūbūlīs) is a 2021 Algerian drama film directed by Djafar Gacem depicting the Sétif and Guelma massacre of 1945. It was selected as the Algerian entry for the Best International Feature Film at the 93rd Academy Awards but was withdrawn after the film's national premiere was canceled due to COVID-19. The filmmakers announced their intention to compete the following year. In October 2021, it was again selected as the Algerian entry for the Best International Feature Film at the 94th Academy Awards.

== Plot ==
In Guelma, Victory in Europe Day is a life-altering event for one Algerian family: French troops are about to commit a massacre against Algerian civilians.

== Cast ==
- Amine Mekki: Mahfoud
- Souhila Maalem: Nedjma
- Mourad Oudjit: Youssef
- Ahmed Benaïssa: The father
- Mohamed Frin: The French commander
- Abdelkrim Benchadli: The mayor
- Leila Hamada: The mother
- Rania Serine: Fatma
- Karim Boulekroua: The officer

== See also ==
- List of submissions to the 93rd Academy Awards for Best International Feature Film
- List of submissions to the 94th Academy Awards for Best International Feature Film
- List of Algerian submissions for the Academy Award for Best International Feature Film
