= Farid Rockeur =

- Born: Farid Kessaissia; July 24, 1963; Algiers, Algeria
- Died: July 12, 2021 (aged 57); Algiers, Algeria
- Citizenship: Algerian
- Occupation(s): Comedian, actor, TV host
- Notable work: Nass Mlah City; Djemai Family; El Hadj Lakhdar

Farid Kessaissia, better known as Farid Rockeur, born on 24 July 1963 in Algiers and died on 12 July 2021 in Algiers, was an Algerian comedian, actor and presenter.

== Biography ==
Farid Rockeur began his artistic career in 1985 with the film Pour l'amour de l'Algérie (For the Love of Algeria). He became known to the general public on television thanks to the variety show Bled Music, produced by Aziz Smati.

Among his other activities, he participated in programmes such as Rock Dialna and Bouzenzel.

== Filmography ==
Year	Title	Type (film / series / show)
1985	Pour l’amour de l’Algérie	Film
Late 1980s	Bled Music	Variety show
2002	Nass Mlah City	Comedy series
2008	Djemai Family	Ramadan series
2007	El Hadj Lakhdar	Series / TV film
2018	Dar Laajeb	Series
Various	Rock Dialna	TV show
Various	Bouzenzel	Sketch / show

== Style and contribution ==
Farid Rockeur was known for his outspoken nature, spontaneous humour and his blend of comedy, social satire and musical culture. He was passionate about rock music, hence his nickname, and loved to pay tribute to Elvis Presley and other rock icons. He also produced jingles for radio and television.

== Death ==
Farid Rockeur died on 12 July 2021 in Algiers of cardiac arrest at the age of 62. He is buried in the Sefsafa cemetery in Algiers.

== See also ==
- Cinema of Algeria
- List of Algerian films
- Nass Mlah City
- Djemai Family
