= Qoloub Tahta Ramad =

- قلوب تحت الرماد (Qoloub Tahta Ramad)
- Genre: Soap opera
- Written by: Zahra Al-ajami
- Directed by: Bachir Sellami
- Starring: Sara Lalama; Bahia Rachedi; Rania Serroti; Mustapha Laribi
- Composer: Younes Bahri
- Country of origin: Algeria
- Original language: Arabic
- No. of seasons: 1
- No. of episodes: 30

Production
- Production location: Algeria
- Running time: 45 minutes
- Production company: EPTV GROUP

Original release
- Network: Télévision Algérienne
- Release: 6 June – 5 July 2016

Qoloub Tahta Ramad (Arabic: قلوب تحت الرماد; English: Hearts under the ashes) is an Algerian television soap opera directed by Bachir Sellami. Broadcast from 6 June to 5 July 2016, the show aired on the channel A3 on Télévision Algérienne. The show aired during Ramadan, the month of fasting and religious observance in Islam.

== Premise ==
The series tells the story of two families who had friendly relations and familiarity, but after the divorce between the spouses in one of the families, the problems arise, the events develop dramatically and show conflicts and psychological contract, doubles the suffering of the divorced couple's daughters. The father was forced to take care of his daughters and their care after the mother left them for many years. After the girls grew up, the mother returns and tries to retrieve them by force, influence and money.

== Cast ==
- Sara Lalama
- Bahia Rachedi
- Rania Serroti
- Mostafa Laaribi
