= French Expeditionary Corps =

There have been several French Expeditionary Corps (French Corps expéditionnaire [français]):

- Expeditionary Corps of the Orient [Corps expéditionnaire d'Orient, CEO] (1915), during World War I
- Expeditionary Corps of the Dardanelles [Corps expéditionnaire des Dardanelles, CED] (1915–16), during World War I
- French Expeditionary Corps in Scandinavia [Corps expéditionnaire français en Scandinavie, CEFS] (1940), during World War II
- French Expeditionary Corps in Italy [Corps expéditionnaire français en Italie, CEFI] (1943–44), during World War II
- French Expeditionary Corps in the Far East [Corps expéditionnaire français en Extrême-Orient, CEFEO] (1945–1956), during the First Indochina War
