= Blaise Duval =

French general

- Blaise Duval de Hautmaret
- Born: 4 September 1739; Abbeville (France)
- Died: 17 January 1803 (aged 63); Neuville-sous-Montreuil (France)
- Spouse: Marie-Josèphe Festamel
- Military career
- Allegiance: France
- Branch: Cavalry
- Rank: Général de Division
- Conflicts: Seven Years' War; French Revolutionary Wars
- Awards: Order of Saint Louis; Name inscribed on the Arc de Triomphe de l'Étoile, 4th column.
- Other work: Pas de Calais General councillor (1800–1803)

Blaise Duval de Hautmaret, or more widely referred to as Blaise Duval, (4 September 1739 – 17 January 1803) was a French general of the Revolutionary Wars.

== Biography ==
Son of a merchant, he was born in Abbeville in northern France. He was cornet in the Garde du corps of the King in 1758. He fought in the Seven Years' War in the 11th régiment de chasseurs à cheval (de) called Soubise Volunteers Regiment.

He was promoted to lieutenant on 26 March 1762, captain on 1 July 1766 and lieutenant colonel on 3 March 1774. He was appointed a member of the Order of Saint Louis in 1778.

On 22 September 1786, he was posted as a Lieutenant du Roi in the Montreuil citadel. He was discharged with the headquarters staff of this citadel on 1 August 1791.

Lieutenant-colonel with Ancien Régime, he was posted with the same grade in the 1st Somme battalion on 6 September 1791. He was colonel of the 6th Dragoon Regiment from 23 March 1792.

He was promoted to General de Brigade on 25 August 1792 in the Army of the North by Dumouriez then Maréchal de camp and commander-in-chief of the Pont-sur-Sambre military camp. He was confirmed in that rank by the Provisional Executive Committee on 7 September 1792. He served under Anne François Augustin de La Bourdonnaye in September, and then was posted to the northern division of the Army of Belgium under Francisco de Miranda in November, then Commander of Brussels in December.

Became Executive Officer for the Brabant and Hainaut on 20 February 1793. He was promoted general of division on 3 February 1793 and took command of the places of Arras, Peronne, Bapaume, Doullens and Saint-Pol on 14 May 1793. He was charged by the directors of the Pas-de-Calais department to take over the command of the Army in the event of a British landing along the Montreuil coasts.

== Late career ==
Suspended by the War Minister, Bouchotte, he was placed under arrest but saved by the Thermidorian reaction.

Impaired and in poor health, he was discharged on 5 December 1797, and then appointed commander of the 8th Demi-brigade of veterans on 18 October 1800.

He was elected to the Pas de Calais General council from 1800 to 1803 and died in Neuville, near Montreuil in 1803 aged 63.

== Family life ==
He married Marie-Josèphe Festamel who gave him two sons and three daughters. The eldest, Jean-Blaise-Alexandre Duval, born in Montreuil on 24 June 1797, initially intended to the Prytanée National Militaire, became a second lieutenant in the 19th line regiment (fr) in 1814 and his younger brother chose to enter the Imperial Cavalry School of Saint-Germain.

== Honours ==
- Member of Order of Saint Louis
- His name is inscribed on the Arc de Triomphe de l'Étoile, 4th column.

== Miscellaneous ==
- A barrack was named after him in the town of Montreuil-sur-Mer.

== Sources ==
- Generals Who Served in the French Army during the Period 1789 - 1814: Dubois to Duvignot
