= Morsan =

- Commune
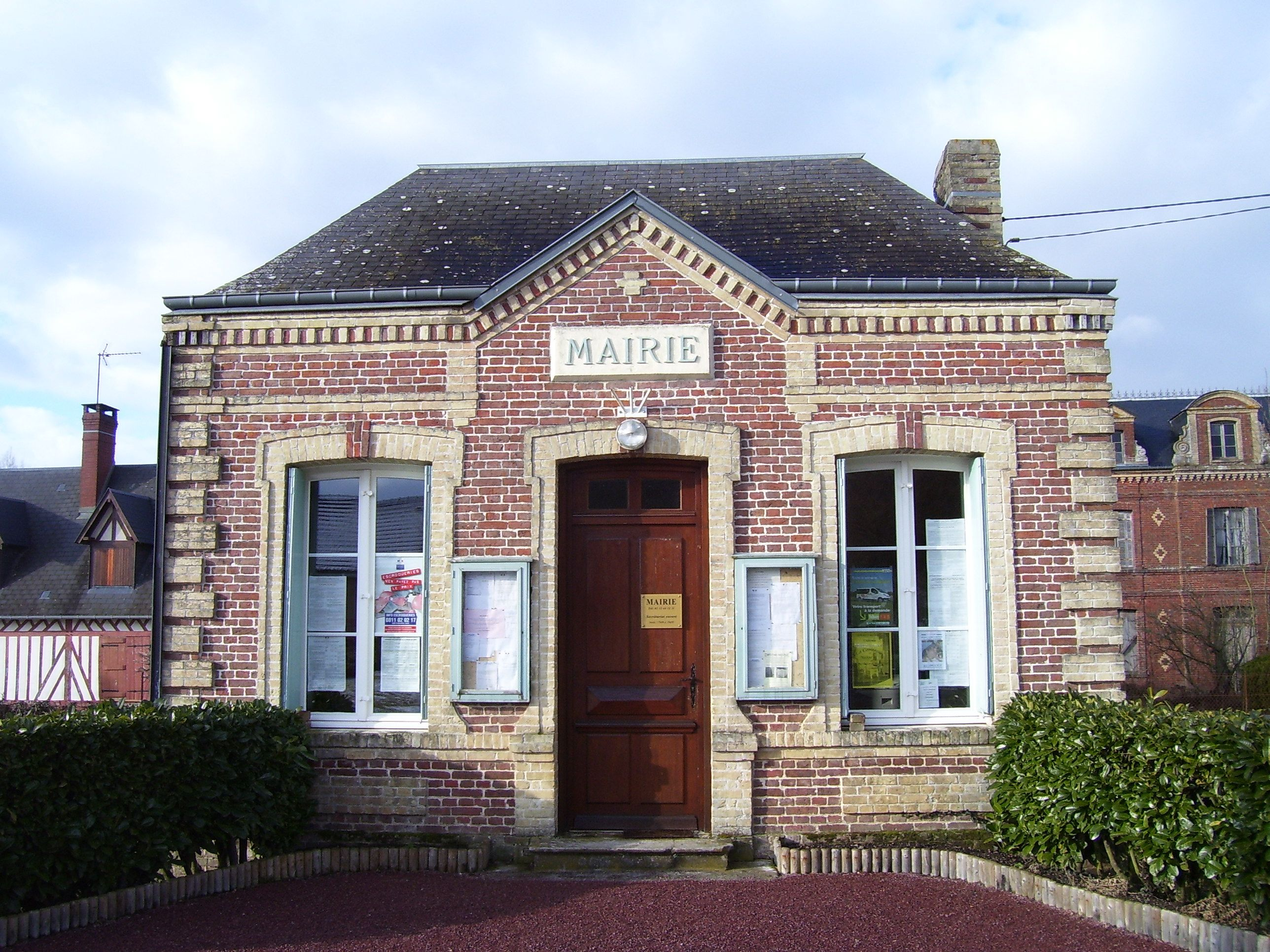
- Town hall
- Location of Morsan
- Location within France Location within Normandy
- Coordinates: 49°10′57″N 0°35′42″E
- Country: France
- Region: Normandy
- Department: Eure
- Arrondissement: Bernay
- Canton: Brionne

Government
  - Mayor (2020–2026): Francis Agasse
- Area^{1}: 4.83 km^{2} (1.86 sq mi)
- Elevation: 172 m (564 ft)
- Highest elevation: 175 m (574 ft)
- Lowest elevation: 155 m (509 ft)
- Population (2023): 124
  - Density: 25.7/km^{2} (66.5/sq mi)
- Time zone: UTC+01:00 (CET)
  - Summer (DST): UTC+02:00 (CEST)
- INSEE/Postal code: 27418 /27800
- ^{1} French Land Register data, which excludes lakes, ponds, glaciers > 1 km^{2} (0.386 sq mi or 247 acres) and river estuaries.

Morsan (French pronunciation: [mɔʁsɑ̃]) is a commune in the Eure department in Normandy in northern France. The inhabitants are called Morsanais.

== History ==
In medieval times Morsan was also written Morçan, Morsent or Morseng. It belonged to the Bec Abbey until Jean de Morsent 1276 affirmed that he needed his wealth for his followers in times of war.

Chevalier Philémon Lesens (also Le Sens), was the first baron of Morsan. He was nobleman of the Maison du Roi of King Henry IV of France and governor of Bernay. He built a hunting lodge. At the time of Abdon-Thomas-François Lesens (1724–1800), who had been page of King Louis XV before he became marquis of Morsan, Ange-Jacques Gabriel (1698–1782) redesigned the facade. The hunting lodge is privately owned nowadays.

Morsan got municipal administration in 1789.

In 1871, during the Franco-Prussian War Morsan was garrisoned by the Prussian army. In 1940, during World War II it was garrisoned by the German army.

There are no street names in Morsan, the village is divided in districts. The old districts of Morsan were: le Château, la Couranterie, les Jumeaux, la Mourioterie, la Mondière. The center of the village is called Bourg instead of la Mondière today.

Morsan is one of the communes in Eure under the risk of sudden forming of deneholes. In former times the peasants have exploited the marl underground to fertilize the fields. During heavy rain those ancient excavations can open again. These special deneholes are round holes of 1,5–2 meters diameter and several meters deep. There are around 16000 of those holes in the département Eure.

== Population ==
Historical population
Year	Pop.	±% p.a.
1968	130	—
1975	130	+0.00%
1982	93	−4.67%
1990	70	−3.49%
1999	92	+3.08%
2007	115	+2.83%
2012	125	+1.68%
2017	108	−2.88%
2023	124	+2.33%
Source: INSEE

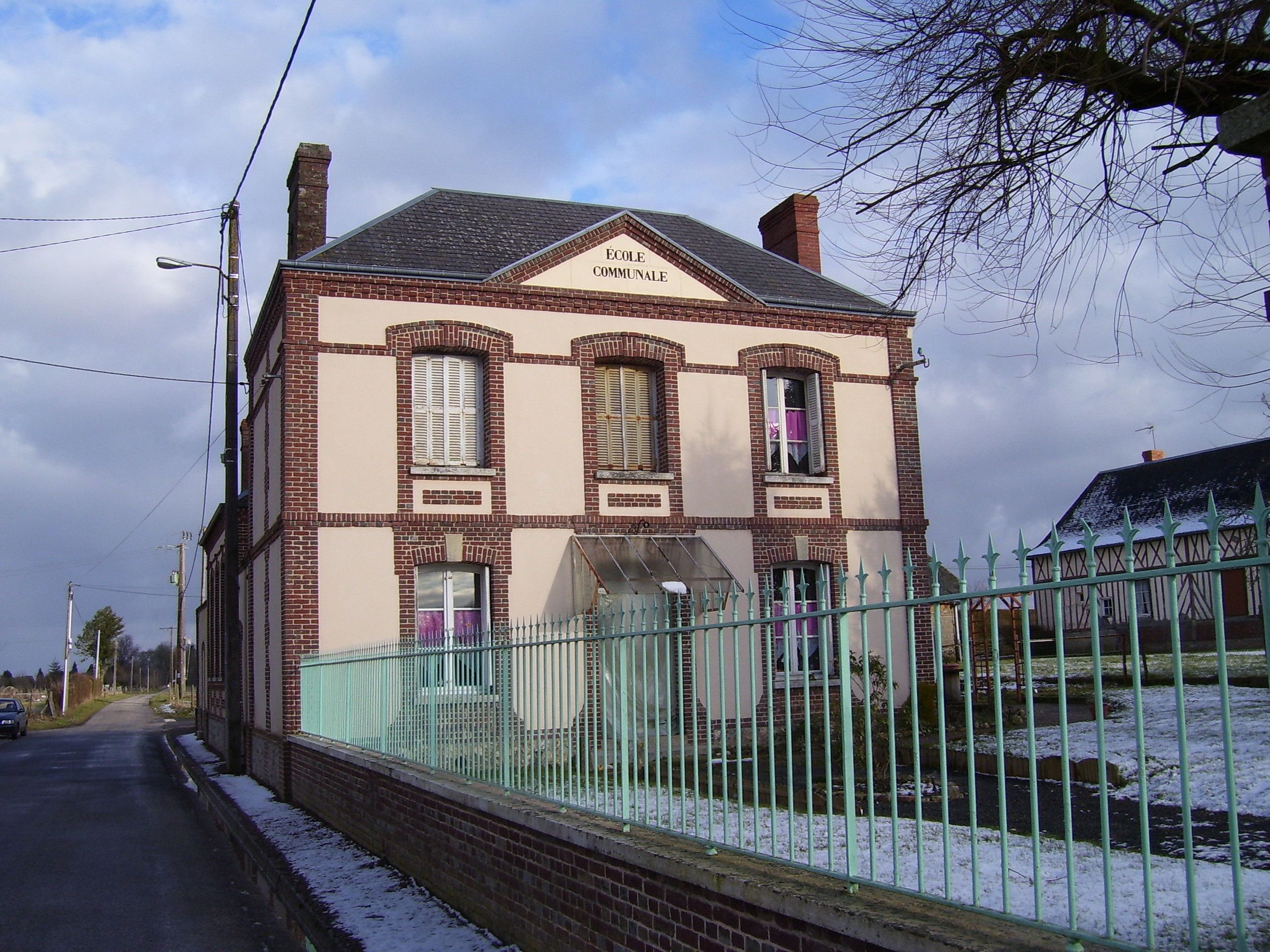
village school

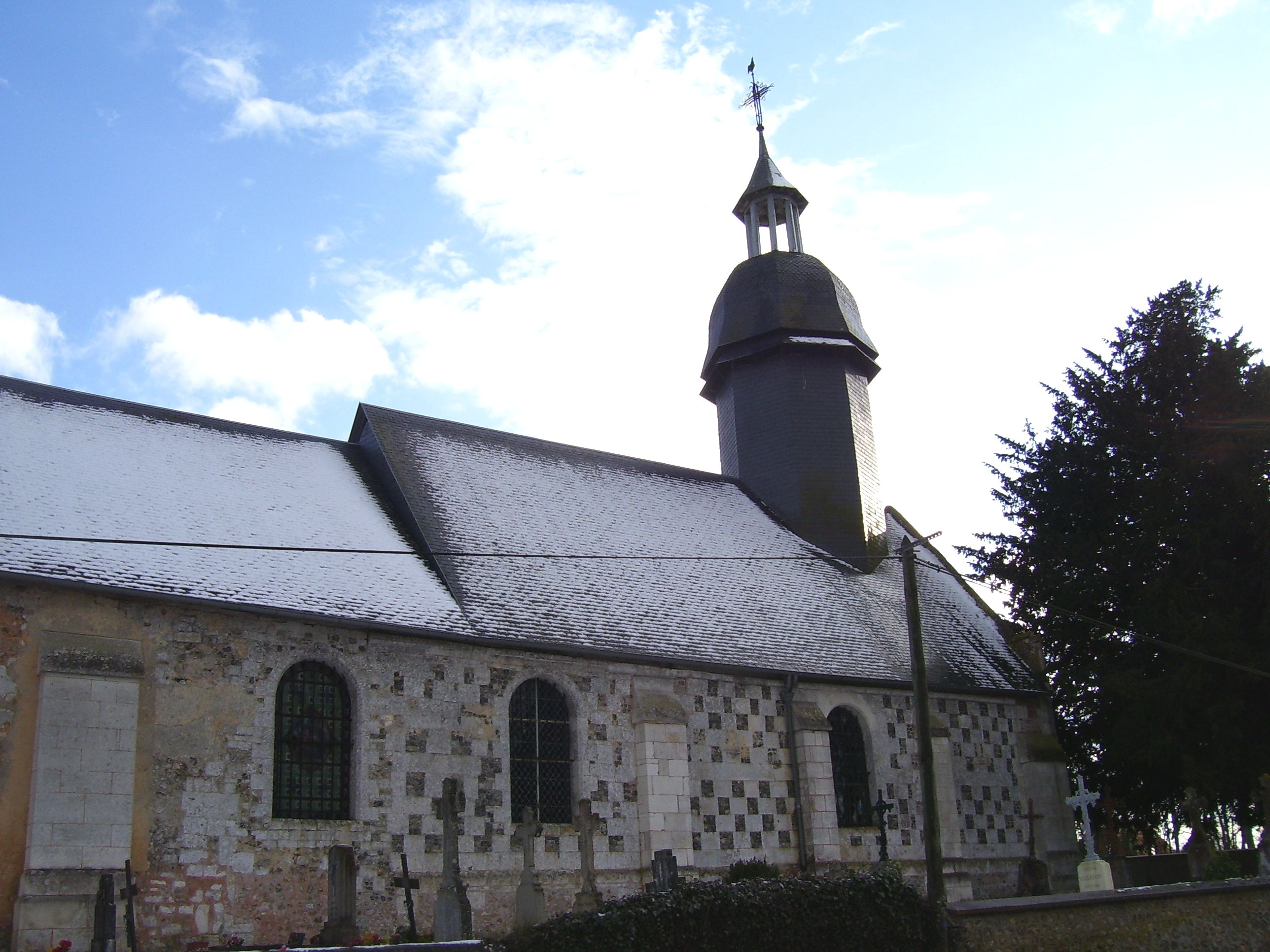
Church de la sainte Trinité in Morsan. Nave was built in the 13th century, choir in the 17th century.

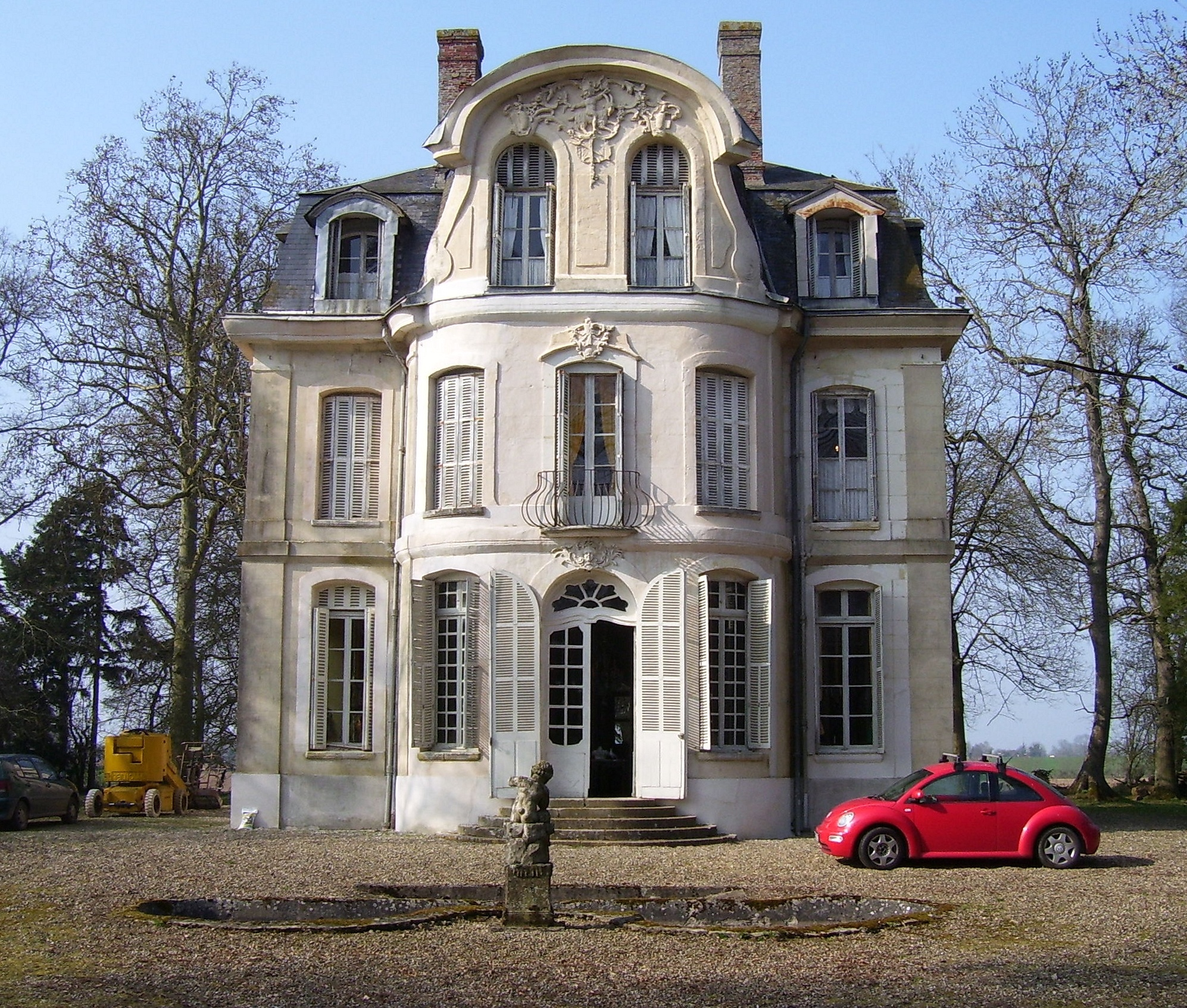
Le Château Blanc, the baroque Lustschloss of Morsan

== See also ==
- Communes of the Eure department
