= Djamel Laroussi =

Djamel Laroussi is an Algerian singer, composer, songwriter, arranger and guitar player.

Laroussi was born in Bologhine, a suburb of Algiers, Algeria. He later moved to Cologne, Germany, to attend the Cologne University of Music. Since 2018 he is Member of the Group de:Wildes Holz from Recklinghausen, Germany.

Laroussi sings in Algerian Arabic, French and Kabyle Berber. Djamel Laroussi was the first person from Africa to be admitted to the prestigious Music University of Cologne. He has graduated the school with honors as he was the first of his class, in composition and jazz arrangements, guitar and drums. He had been engaged in self-education before he was accepted to the University. Djamel is left-handed and plays the guitar upside down without reversing the strings. Being famous in Algeria, Djamel has been the Algerian representative for UNICEF since 2009. In cooperation with the Cultural Minister of Algeria he has set up an annual International Jazz-Festival in Algeria. Stevie Wonder’s Band hired him as a member for the European tour In June and July 2010. During his creative career he has been playing with many Jazz musicians such as Graham Haynes, Steve Williamson, Nelson Veras, Keith Copeland, Chico Freeman. His music is a mixture of Western sound from Jazz and rock which is melt in his Arabic-Kabyle genes, and has always worked across different styles and genres.

== Discography ==
- Etoile Filante (2002)

Live albums'

- Live (2004)
- 3 Marabouts (2007)
- Sapoutaly (2004)
