= Nass Mlah City =

- Logotipe of the second season of the series
- Also known as: Arabic: ناس ملاح سيتي
- Genre: Comedy; Sitcom
- Created by: Djafar Gacem
- Directed by: Djafar Gacem
- Starring: Biyouna; Kahina Belarbi; Farid Rockeur
- Opening theme: Biyouna
- Composers: Baaziz (Season 1); Radia Bensarsa (Seasons 2 & 3)
- Country of origin: Algeria
- Original language: Arabic
- No. of seasons: 3
- No. of episodes: 57

Production
- Production locations: Algiers, Algeria
- Production company: Timgad Production

Original release
- Network: Télévision Algérienne; Canal Algérie; A3
- Release: 6 November 2002 – March 2006

Related
- Rendezvous with Destiny (2007)

Nass Mlah City (Arabic: ناس ملاح سيتي, Nās Mlāḥ Siti, meaning : The City of Good People) is a Algerian Television comedy series, which was directed by Djafar Gacem. It was first aired on Télévision Algérienne, Canal Algérie and A3 on 6 November 2002, and has since then produced over fifty-seven episodes. It was considered as the most popular sitcom of Algeria in the 2000s.

== Overview ==
Season	No. of episodes	Originally aired	
Season	No. of episodes	First aired	Last aired
1	23	6 November 2002	March 2003
2	17	27 October 2004	February 2005
3	17	22 October 2005	March 2006

== Cast ==
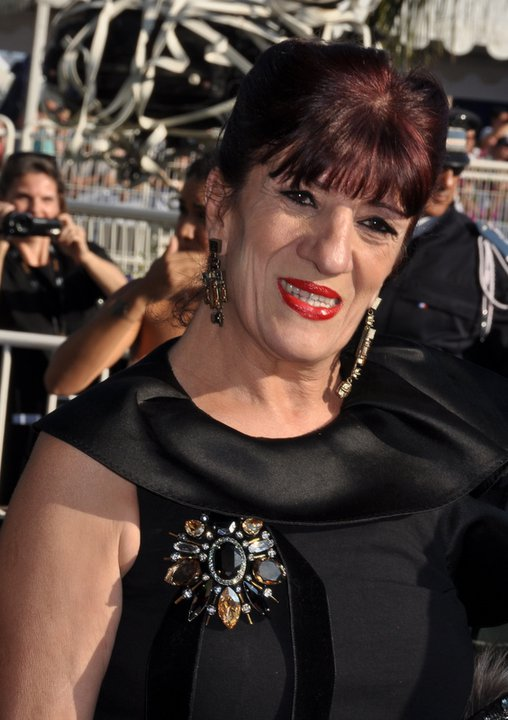
Biyouna is one of the cast

Nass Mlah City consists of several Algerian actors whose personages change according to roles in each episode. The main and most present character in the series is the famous actress, singer and comedian Biyouna. Younger actors include the comedian and model Kahina Belarbi.

== Episodes by detail ==
Episode	Name in French	Name in English	Watch in YouTube
S1.E01	Le séjour	The stay	YouTube
S1.E02	Marriage par annonce	Marriage by announcement	YouTube
S1.E03	Le voyant	The clairvoyant	YouTube
S1.E04	La voyante	The clairvoyant	YouTube
S1.E05	L'avare	The miser	YouTube
S1.E06	Le guichet	The counter	YouTube
S1.E07	Le sachet	The bag	YouTube
S1.E08	La convocation	The summons	YouTube
S1.E09	Clients virtuels	Virtual clients	YouTube
S1.E10	Le jeûneur	The faster	YouTube
S1.E11	Taxi Phone	Taxi Phone	YouTube
S1.E12	Coupe class	Classy cut	YouTube
S1.E13	Piscine Hassan Beach	Hassan Beach swimming pool	YouTube
S1.E14	Le dossier	The file	YouTube
S1.E15	La jalouse	the wicket	YouTube
S1.E16	Les mille et une nuit et bayouna	The thousand and one nights and bayouna	YouTube
S1.E17	Le Tôlier	The Sheet metal worker	YouTube
S1.E18	Cendrillon	Cinderella	YouTube
S1.E19	Le gargotier 5 saisons	The 5 seasons tavern	YouTube
S1.E20	La fête	The party	YouTube
S1.E21	L'accusé	The accused	YouTube
S1.E22	Un Mari pour ma fille	A husband for my daughter	YouTube
S1.E23	Urgences	Emergencies	YouTube
S2.E01	L'incident de l'éventail	The fan incident	YouTube
S2.E02	Swiley	Swiley	YouTube
S2.E03	Braquage	Heist	YouTube
S2.E04	La classe spéciale	The special class	YouTube
S2.E05	Les 3 enveloppes	The 3 envelopes	YouTube
S2.E06	Atman	Atman	YouTube
S2.E07	La fausse nounou	The fake nanny	YouTube
S2.E08	Taille mannequin	Model size	YouTube
S2.E09	Le psychologue	The psychologist	YouTube
S2.E10	Mission impossible	Mission impossible	YouTube
S2.E11	Bayana Jones	Bayana Jones	YouTube
S2.E12	Le prisonnier	The prisoner	YouTube
S2.E13	Chico et Fatcha	Chico and Fatcha	YouTube
S2.E14	Drôles de dames	Charlie's Angels	YouTube
S2.E15	Le Real nass mlah	The Real nass mlah	YouTube
S2.E16	Le feuilleton	The soap opera	YouTube
S2.E17	Les pirates	Pirates	YouTube
S3.E01	Voyage dans le temps 1	Time travel 1	YouTube
S3.E02	Voyage dans le temps 2	Time travel 2	YouTube
S3.E03	Bachir et les 7 soeurs	Bachir and the 7 sisters	YouTube
S3.E04	La menace Asiatique	The Asian threat	YouTube
S3.E05	Nass Mlah Airways	Nass Mlah Airways	YouTube
S3.E06	L'épouse importée	The imported bride	YouTube
S3.E07	Agence tous marriages	All marriage agency	YouTube
S3.E08	Les feux de l'humour	The fires of humor	YouTube
S3.E09	Le visa	The visa	YouTube
S3.E10	Le ticket gagnant	The winning ticket	YouTube
S3.E11	La vengeance de Yakout	Yakout's revenge	YouTube
S3.E12	La tribu	The tribe	YouTube
S3.E13	Z-files: l'affaire Boufarik	Z-files: the Boufarik affair	YouTube
S3.E14	Haylandra	Haylandra	YouTube
S3.E15	Blanche Neige et les 7 nains	Snow White and the 7 Dwarfs	YouTube
S3.E16	Nass Mlah Academy	Nass Mlah Academy	YouTube
S3.E17	Mousty. Le Boxeur	Mousty. The Boxer	YouTube
