= Bled Music =

- Created by: Aziz Smati
- Presented by: Kamel Dynamite, Farid Rockeur, Samia Benkherroubi
- Country of origin: Algeria
- Original languages: Arabic; Tamaziɣt; French

Bled Music was an Algerian TV show that aired on ENTV in the late 1980s and early 1990s. It was produced by Aziz Smati and presented by Kamel Dynamite, Farid Rockeur and Samia Benkherroubi. It was the first show to air Raï music on Algerian television. It presented a ranking of music videos by popularity and relied on fans sending in their votes by mail.

== Significance ==
The show was widely popular among Algerian households during its time and is recognized as having had a significant impact on the Algerian music scene, allowing many burgeoning musicians to break out of anonymity, including Chaba Fadela, Cheb Sahraoui, Cheb Anouar, and Mohamed Lamine.

== Algerian Civil War ==
Civil unrest broke out in Algeria in the late 1980s and led to what came to be known as the Black Decade. During this time, fundamentalist groups attempted to impose a literal interpretation of religious texts, banning music and most other forms of artistic expression. The show continued to air despite death threats but on 14 February 1994 Aziz Smati was shot in both legs by a young extremist, leading eventually to the end of the show.
