= Henry Martin (general) =

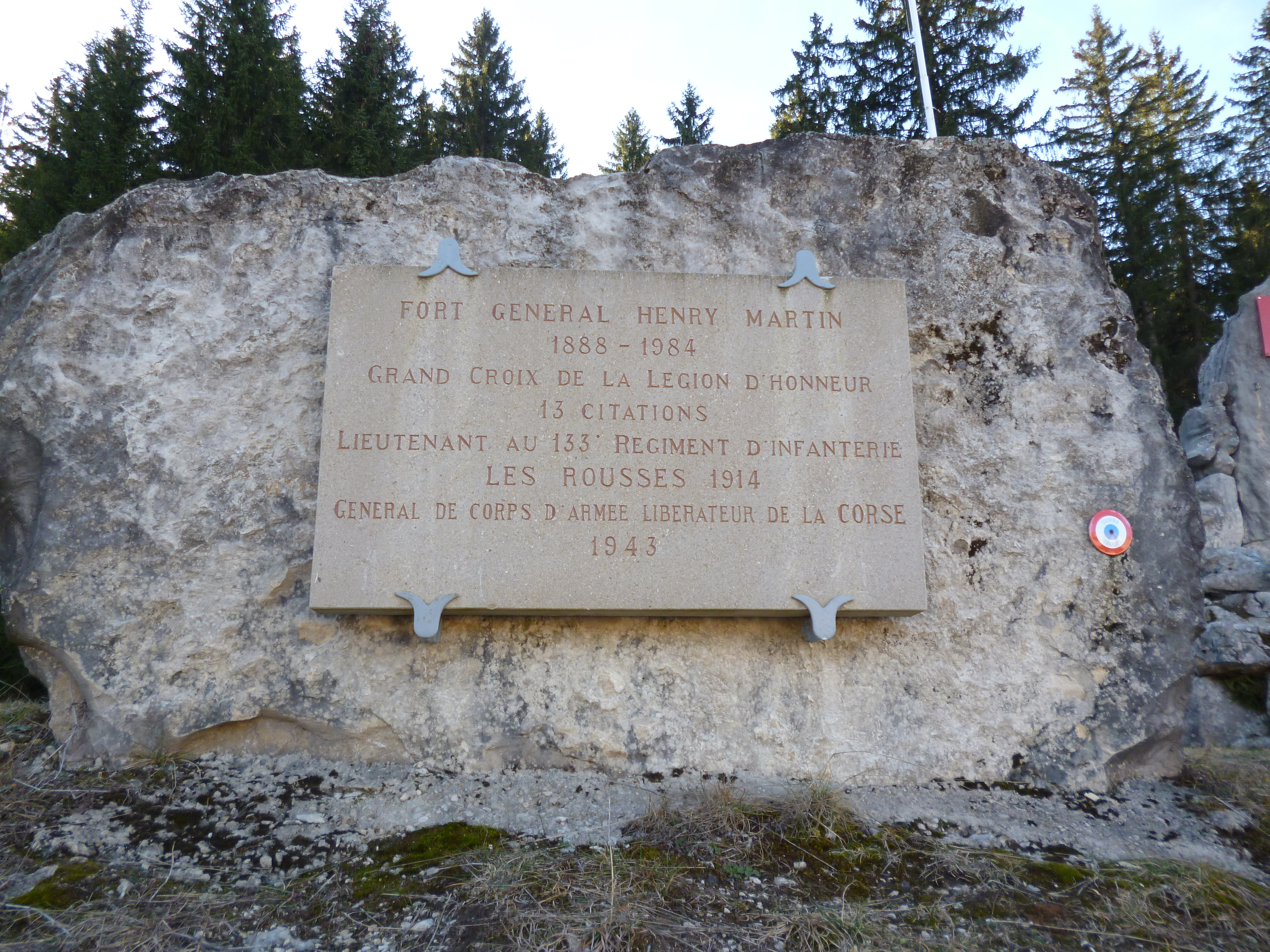
Plaque in honour of General Henry Martin, located at Fort des Rousses (Jura), officially named Fort General Henry Martin.

Henry Jules Jean Maurice Martin (27 October 1888 – 24 June 1984) was a French general.

== Biography ==
Martin fought in World War I from 1914 until 6 April 1918, when he was severely wounded and taken prisoner by the Germans.

In May 1940 he commanded the 87th African Infantry Division (in the Sixth Army of General Robert-Auguste Touchon and the Seventh Army of General Aubert Frère) during the Battle of France on the Ailette, where he took an active part in the defense of the Aisne, then retreated to the Seine and the Loire.

From August 1940 until June 1943, he was at the head of the Marrakech Division. After the Allied invasion of Northern Africa, the French Army was rebuilt there and Martin received command of the 4th Moroccan Mountain Division, before taking command of the 1st Army Corps, in which capacity he commanded French troops during the liberation of Corsica in September–October 1943 and of the island of Elba in June 1944. Between August 1944 and December 1946, he was commander of the 19th Corps in Algeria, notably during the Sétif massacres. He retired in December 1946.
