= Djemai Family =

- Genre: Sitcom
- Written by: Oussama Benhassine
- Directed by: Djaafar Gacem
- Starring: Salah Aougrout; Samira Sahraoui; Mohamed Bouchaïb; Bouchra Okbi; Azzeddine Bouchaïb; Othmane Ben Daoud; Wissam Boualem; Blaha Ben Ziane; Farida Krim
- Country of origin: Algeria
- Original language: Arabic
- No. of seasons: 3
- No. of episodes: 57

Production
- Executive producer: SD-BOX
- Producer: Sid Ahmed Guenaoui
- Running time: 30 min

Original release
- Network: Télévision Algérienne
- Release: 30 August 2008 – 30 August 2011

Djemai Family is an Algerian sitcom broadcast during the months of Ramadan 2008, 2009 and 2011. It was produced by SD-BOX, written by Osama Benhassine and Djaffar Gacem, and dialogued by Mohamed Charchal.

The series tells the everyday life of an Algerian family with fresh and simple stories, dealing with originality the problems and challenges of contemporary Algerian society in a comic concept. It premiered on 2008 on Télévision Algérienne, A3 and Canal Algérie.

== Cast ==
- Salah Aougrout as Djemai
- Samira Sahraoui as Meriem
- Bouchra Okbi as Sarah
- Mohamed Bouchaïb as Rezki/Aristo
- Doudja Abdoun as Khoukha
- Farida Karim as Khalti Boualem
- Othmane Ben Daoud as Pedro
- Wissam Boualem as Wissam
- Azzeddine Bouchaïb as Samy
- Kawther El Bardi as Sakina
- Blaha Ben Ziane as Kadda
- Kamel Bouakkaz as Azzouz
- Mustapha Himoune as Lakhdar
- Hakim Zelloum as The inspector Fahem
- Farid Rockeur
