= Biyouna =

Algerian singer, dancer and actress (1952–2025)

Biyouna بيونة
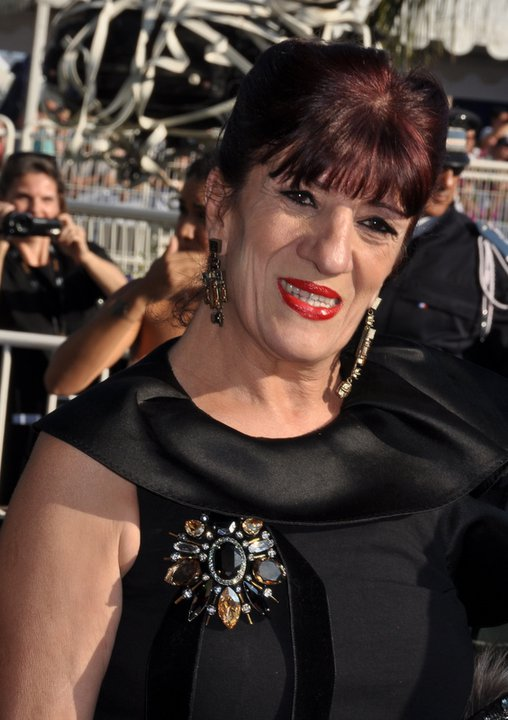
- Biyouna in 2011

Background information
- Born: Baya Bouzar; 13 September 1952; Belcourt, Algiers, French Algeria
- Died: 25 November 2025 (aged 73) Algiers, Algeria
- Genres: Raï; pop; pop rock
- Occupations: Singer; dancer; actress; comedian
- Instruments: Vocals; guitar; goblet drum
- Years active: 1973–2025
- Labels: Warner

Baya Bouzar (Arabic: باية بوزار; 13 September 1952 – 25 November 2025), known by the stage name Biyouna (بيونة), was an Algerian singer, dancer and actress.

== Early life ==
Biyouna was born on 13 September 1952 in the Belcourt neighbourhood of Algiers. Having a very early passion for singing, she was a member of several groups: first in Fadhéla Dziria's group where she played tambourine, another that she directed with her partner Flifla, and finally her own where she was the main vocalist and became sought after for wedding receptions.

At the age of 17, she began performing in some of the biggest cabarets in the city and at 19 started dancing at the Copacabana.

== Acting career ==
That same year, the director Mustapha Badie gave her a singing part in his first soap opera, La Grande Maison (1973), where she played Fatma. This show was adapted from a novel by Mohamed Dib. She became well-known thanks to this role.

She appeared in two Algerian films: Leila and the others, by Sid Ali Mazif in 1978, and The Neighbor, by Ghaouti Bendedouche in 2000. She also performed some one-woman shows. In 1999, Nadir Moknèche offered her the role of Meriem in Madame Osmane's Harem which she produced in France. This film was followed by Viva Laldjéri in 2003.

Between 2002 and 2005, Biyouna had success with a trilogy based on the theme of Ramadan called Nass Mlah City.

She appeared in the last film of Nadir Moknèche, Délice Paloma (2007), where she played the main character, a mafiosa named Madame Aldjeria. In 2006, she performed the role of Coryphée in Sophocles' Elektra beside Jane Birkin in an opera directed by Philippe Calvaio. In 2007, she had a small role in the Algerian film Rendez-vous avec le destin.

In 2009, she played La Celestina at the Vingtième Théâtre in Paris. For Ramadan, 2010, Biyouna was one of the stars in a sitcom broadcast on Nessma TV, Nsibti Laaziza.

== Musical career ==
Meanwhile, she continued her singing career, and in 2001 issued the album Raid Zone, produced with the composer John Bagnolett. After the success of this album and her participation in Jérome Savary's Opéra de Casbah she brought out another album called Blonde dans la casbah. She had been planning this album for some time. Biyouna took her time, carefully choosing a Franco-Algerian repertoire which explored both cultures.

== Personal life and death ==
Biyouna lived with her husband and four children in a suburb of Algiers. She died on 25 November 2025, at the age of 73.

== Discography ==
- 2001: Raid Zone
- 2007: Blonde dans la Casbah

=== Singles ===
- "Pamela" (2001)
- "Les yeux noirs" (2002)
- "In her eyes" (2002)
- "Tu es ma vie" (2002)
- "Maoudlik" (2003)
- "Taali" (2006)
- "Une Blonde Platine dans la Casbah " (2007)
- "Demain tu te maries" (2007)
- "Merci pour tout (c'que j'n'ai pas)" (2007)
- "El Bareh" (2008)
- "Tsaabli ouetmili" (2008)

== Filmography ==
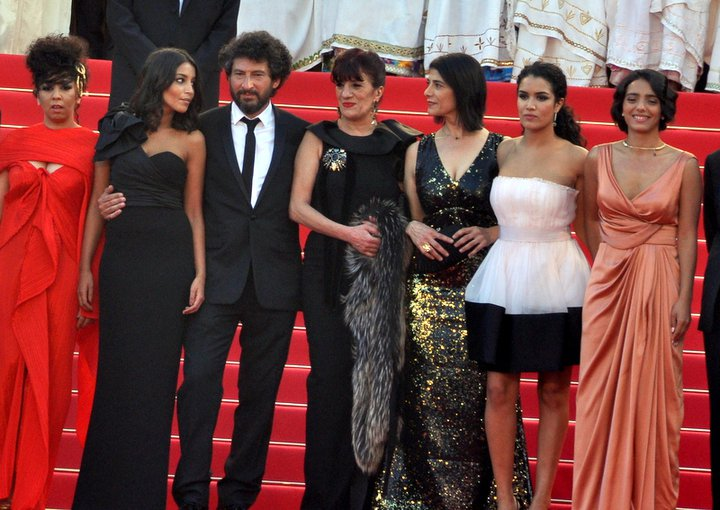
Biyouna in the 2011 Cannes Film Festival

=== Films ===
Year	Title	Role	Notes
1978	Leila et les autres		
1979	Le Chat		
1999	Le Harem de madame Osmane	Meriem	
2001	La voisine		
2003	Viva Laldjérie	Papicha	
2004	Beur blanc rouge	Mother of Wassila	
2005	Rue des figuiers	Fatima	
2007	Delice Paloma	Madame Aldjeria/Zineb Agha	
2008	Garçon manqué	Nana	
2009	Aïcha	Biyouna	
2010	Bacon on the Side	Houria	
2010	Holiday	Eva Lopez	
2011	Aïcha 2	Biyouna	
2011	The Source	The Old Gun	
2011	Beur sur la ville	Khalid's mother	
2011	Aïcha 3	Biyouna	
2012	Aïcha 4	Biyouna	
2013	Cheba Louisa		
2013	Mohamed Dubois		
2013	Les Reines du ring		
2014	Amour sur place ou à emporter : le film !		
2018	Le Flic de Belleville	Zohra	

=== Television ===
Year	Title	Role	Notes
1973	La Grande Maison	Fatma	
2003	Grand plongeoir, Le	Herself	
2003	Nass Mlah City		32 episodes
2004	Nass Mlah City 2		32 episodes
2006	Nass Mlah City 3		55 episodes
2007	La Commune	Hanifa Houbeyche	first season
2007	On n'est pas couché		1 episode
2009	Nessma TV (Zorroh)	Zohra	
2010	One person show	Biyouna	30 episodes
2012	La Baie d'Alger		

=== Theater ===
Year	Title	Role	Notes
2009	La Celestina	Célestine	
2012	Biyouna !	Biyouna	in Théâtre Marigny
