= Souhila Mallem =

Algerian actress

- Mallem in 2021
- Born: Souhila Mallem; June 13, 1988 (age 38); Algiers, Algeria
- Other name: Bibicha
- Education: Law, Algiers 1 University
- Alma mater: Algiers 1 University
- Occupation: Actress
- Years active: 2008–present
- Notable work: Wlad Lahlal

Souhila Mallem (Arabic: سهيلة معلم, romanized: Suhaylah Muʻallim; born 13 June 1988), often known as Bibicha, is an Algerian actress.

== Personal life ==
She was born on 13 June 1988 in Algiers, Algeria. She studied law at the Faculty of Law of Algiers 1 University.In 2026, she got married.

== Career ==
In 2010, she hosted a program sponsored by the 'Cevital group' to support the Algerian national team which broadcast on the national channel ENTV. During the show, she was spotted by the director Djafar Gassem, and later offered the role in the television serial Djemai family 1 as 'Faty'. Then she starred in the serial Dar Bahdja as 'Zina'.

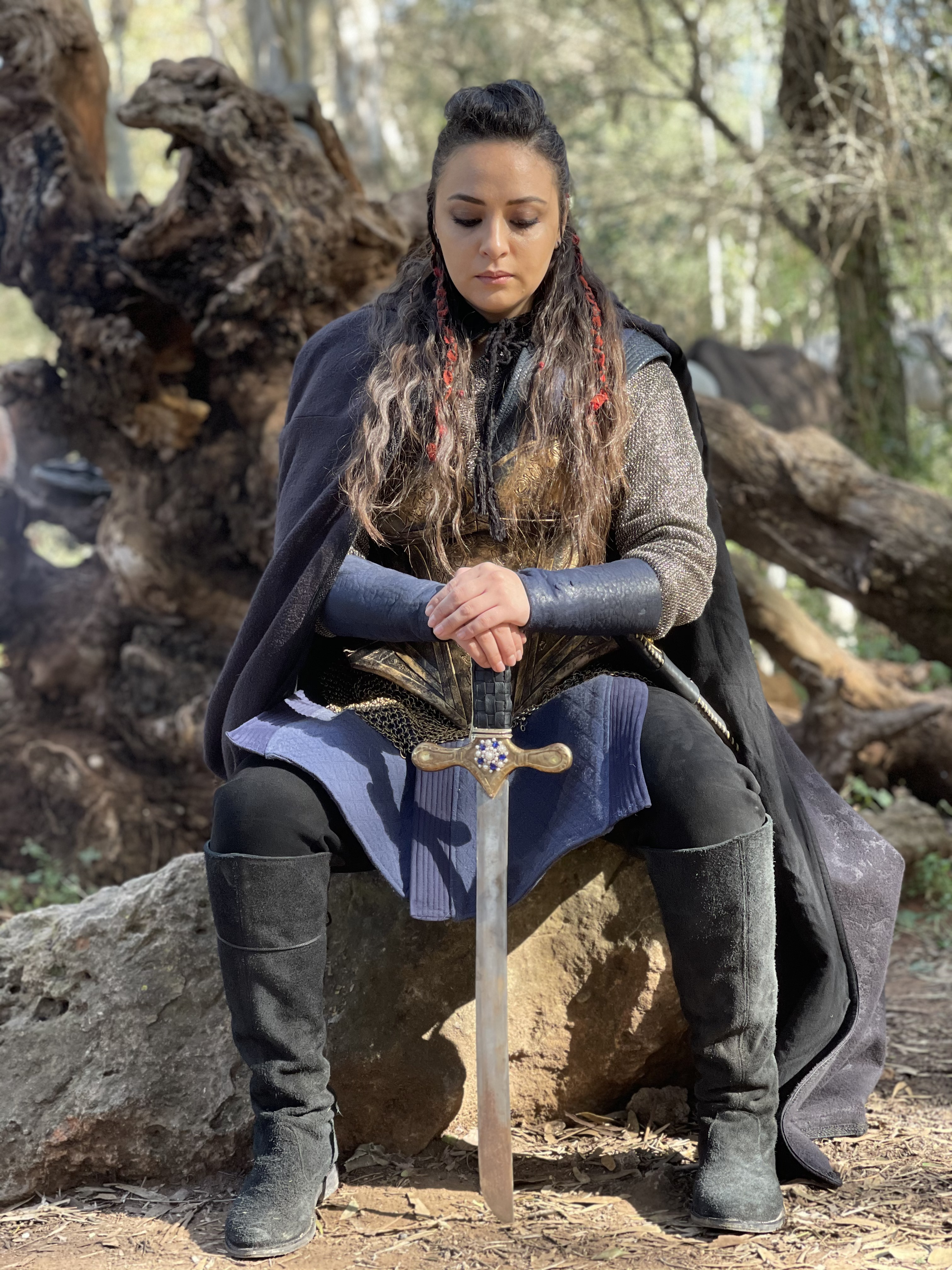
Souhila Mallem, as Sultana Abla

However her most popular television acting came through the role of 'Bibicha' in the popular serial Bibiche and Bibicha. Later she acted as 'Princess Abla' in the serial Sultan Achour 10 and other roles as 'Sabrina' in serial El Khawa and role 'Lila' in the sitcom Wlad Hlal.

== Filmography ==
Year	Film	Role	Genre	Ref.
2008 - 2009	Djemai family (Season 1 & 2)	Faty	TV Series	
2010	Djemai family (Season 3)	Khadija	TV Series	
2010	Parfums d'Alger	Karima	Film	
2010	La Cité des Vieux	Sarah	Film	
2011	Dalil	Amel	TV Series	
2012	Khalti Lallahoum	Meriem	TV Series	
2012	Titi	Lamia	Film	
2012	L'Héroine	Karima	Film	
2012	Le Hublot		Short film	
2012	Caméra Café	Lilia	TV Series	
2013	Switchers	La sœur	TV Series	
2013	Dar El Bahdja	Zina	TV Series	
2013 - 2014	Asrar El Madhi	Amira	TV Series	
2013	Les Jours d'avant	Yamina	Short film	
2013	Certifiée Halal	Souad	Film	
2014 - 2019	Bibiche & Bibicha	Bibicha	TV Series	
2014	Khamsa	Oran Hayat / Selma	TV Series	
2015 - 2017	Sultan Ashour 10 (Season 1 & 2)	Princess Abla	TV Series	
2018	El Khawa	Sabrina	TV Series	
2019	Wlad Lahlal	Leila	TV Series	
2020	Ahwal Anas	herself	TV Series	
2020	Confinement	Mika	TV Series	
2020	Héliopolis	Nedjma	Film	
2020	Babour Ellouh	El Ghalia	TV Series	
2021	Sultan Achour 10 (Season 3)	Sultana Abla	TV Series	
