= Blaha Ben Ziane =

Algerian actor (1953–2021)

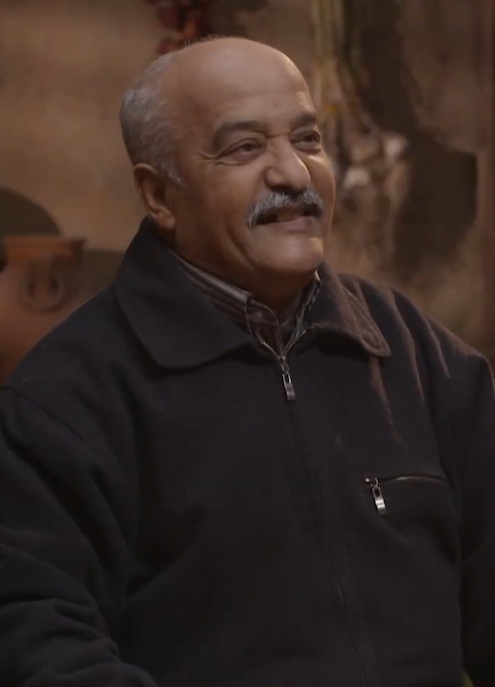
- Ben Ziane in 2021
- Born: 1953; Mascara, Algeria
- Died: 2 May 2021 (aged 67–68); Oran
- Occupation: Actor
- Years active: 1972–2021

Blaha Ben Ziane (1953 – 2 May 2021) was an Algerian actor.

== Biography ==
Born in 1953, Ziane began his involvement in art since entering the Institute of Acting in Oran at Kaddour Ben Khamsa in 1972 and 1973, and participated at the Oran Festival. His first works appeared on television in 1974.

He played several roles in humor, most notably his role in the series "Ashour El Acher", (Achour The Tenth), whose main role was Saleh Oqrut, known as "Al-Nouri", and also his role in the series "Jami Family" as "Leaders of Jami's Neighbor", similar to his role with the entourage of Sultan Ashour the Tenth, who mastered it and is the role par excellence.

Balaha was also active on stage, and one of his most famous theatrical works is "The Apples" by Abdelkader Alloula.
