= List of television channels in Algeria =

This is a list of TV services available on digital terrestrial, satellite, internet streaming and cable systems in Algeria.

== National channels ==
EPG No.	Logo	Channel	Notes	Owner/parent company	Broadcast hours	Format	Multiplex
1		Télévision Algérienne	State owned. commercial station	EPTV GROUP	24 hours	16:9 SDTV	-
2		Canal Algérie	State owned. commercial station	EPTV GROUP	24 hours	16:9 SDTV	-
3		Algérie 3	State owned. commercial station	EPTV GROUP	24 hours	16:9 SDTV	-
4		TV Tamazight 4	State owned.	EPTV GROUP	24 hours	16:9 SDTV	-
5		Coran TV 5	State owned.	EPTV GROUP	24 hours	16:9 SDTV	-
6		Echourouk News	news and information	Echourouk Group	24 hours	16:9 SDTV	-
7		Echourouk TV	Drama and popular TV	Echourouk Group	24 hours	16:9 SDTV	-
8		Echourouk Benna TV	-	Echourouk Group	24 hours	16:9 SDTV	-
9		Dzair News	commercial news and finance channel	Ali Haddad	24 hours	16:9 SDTV	-
10		Dzair TV	-	Ali Haddad	24 hours	16:9 SDTV	-
11		Ennahar TV	commercial news and finance channel	Ennahar Group	24 hours	16:9 SDTV	-
12		Al Magharibia	-	Sami Abbasi	24 hours	16:9 SDTV	-
13		Berbère Télévision	-	-	24 hours	16:9 SDTV	-
14		El Djazairia	-	Yousef Qasim	24 hours	16:9 SDTV	-
15		Numidia News	commercial news and finance channel	-	24 hours	16:9 SDTV	-
16		El Bilad	-	News and popular channel	24 hours	16:9 SDTV	-
17		KBC TV	-	El Khabar Group	24 hours	16:9 SDTV	-
18		Samira TV	Food and cooking TV	Samira Bezaouia	24 hours	16:9 SDTV	-
19		JIL.TV	Commercial music and entertainment channel	-	24 hours	16:9 SDTV	-
20		Al Hogar News	commercial news and finance channel	-	24 hours	16:9 SDTV	-
21		Ennahar Laki	women's channel	Ennahar Group	24 hours	16:9 SDTV	-
22		Al Magharibia 2 TV	-	Sami Abbasi	24 hours	16:9 SDTV	-
23		Beur TV	-	News -	24 hours	16:9 SDTV	-
24		El Adjwaa	-	-	24 hours	16:9 SDTV	-
25		El Heddaf TV	Commercial sports news channel	-	24 hours	16:9 SDTV	-
26		L'Index Algérien TV	-	-	24 hours	16:9 SDTV	-
27		Bahia TV	-	-	24 hours	16:9 SDTV	-
28		Chebab TV	-	-	24 hours	16:9 SDTV	-
29		Dzair Shop	Shopping TV channel	-	24 hours	16:9 SDTV	-
30		Sahara TV Algeria	-	-	24 hours	16:9 SDTV	-
31		Al Fadjr TV	-	-	24 hours	16:9 SDTV	-
32		Hogar TV	-	-	24 hours	16:9 SDTV	-
33		DTV Algérie	-	-	24 hours	16:9 SDTV	-
34		Alanis TV	-	-	24 hours	16:9 SDTV	-
35		Berbère Music	-	Group BRTV	24 hours	16:9 SDTV	-
36		Berbère Jeunesse	-	Group BRTV	24 hours	16:9 SDTV	-
37		Algérie 3 HD	high definition version of Algérie 3	EPTV GROUP	24 hours	1080i HDTV	-
38		Canal Algérie HD	high definition version of Canal Algérie	EPTV GROUP	24 hours	1080i HDTV	-
39		Echourouk TV HD	high definition version of Echourouk TV	Echourouk Group	24 hours	1080i HDTV	-
40		Echourouk News HD	high definition version of Echourouk News	Echourouk Group	24 hours	1080i HDTV	-
41		Berbère Télévision HD	high definition version of Berbère Télévision	Group BRTV	24 hours	1080i HDTV	-

== See also ==
- Television in Algeria
