= USM Alger supporters =

Football club from the inner suburbs of Algiers

Tifo Groupe UNITED 37 against AS FAR in the quarterfinals of the 2022–23 CAF Confederation Cup

The supporters of USM Alger have different songs for each rival club. Their repertoire also includes sociopolitical songs with committed lyrics such as “Qilouna!” (leave us alone!), La casa del Mouradia, Babur ellouh, etc. These songs resonate widely among the Algerian population. In 2019, during the protests that Algeria experienced, the songs of the group Ouled El Bahdja were covered by demonstrators across the country, thus propelling them to the forefront of the international scene. Some ultra groups existed such as the “I Rossi Algeri” or the “Ultras Diablos”, but they disbanded around 2010.

The famous Musical Group, “Groupe Milano”, created in the 1990s, also represents a large part of Usmiste musical and artistic culture, contributing in the past to the production of many popular songs among USMA supporters, sung so far in the stadiums. The Milano Group was also one of the first groups of supporters to produce stadium songs, as well as socio-political songs at that time, during the black decade that Algeria experienced, the group, known for his exceptional music and covers during the 1900s and 2000s, continues to produce songs for the club occasionally.

== Accidents ==
On July 5, 1997, in the middle of the Algerian Civil War, three USM Alger supporters who were celebrating their team's victory in the Algerian Cup were murdered at a false roadblock at Frais Vallon.

On 21 September 2013, during a match against MC Alger, two supporters of USM Alger died and several hundred spectators were injured after part of the stadium collapsed. The incident occurred ten minutes after the end of the match. Following the incident, there was a plan to destroy the whole stadium, but it was ultimately decided that only the upper terraces would be completely removed and renovated, during which the stadium was closed.

On 9 September 2018, seventy minutes into a match between USM Alger and Al-Quwa Al-Jawiya in the Arab Club Champions Cup, Al-Quwa Al-Jawiya's players withdrew in protest at offensive chants from spectators, including mentioning the name of the former president Saddam Hussein and anti-Shia slogans. The Iraqi Ministry of Foreign Affairs summoned Algeria's ambassador in Baghdad over "sectarian chants" made by Algerian fans. Ahmed Mahjoub, Iraq's foreign affairs spokesperson, expressed "the government and the people of Iraq's indignation ... at the glorification of the horrible face of Saddam Hussein's deadly dictatorial regime". Later, General Manager Abdelhakim Serrar apologized to the Iraqi team for fan behavior. The goalkeeper and captain, Mohamed Lamine Zemmamouche, also apologized to the Iraqi delegation for the conduct of the supporters.

== Rivalries and friendships ==
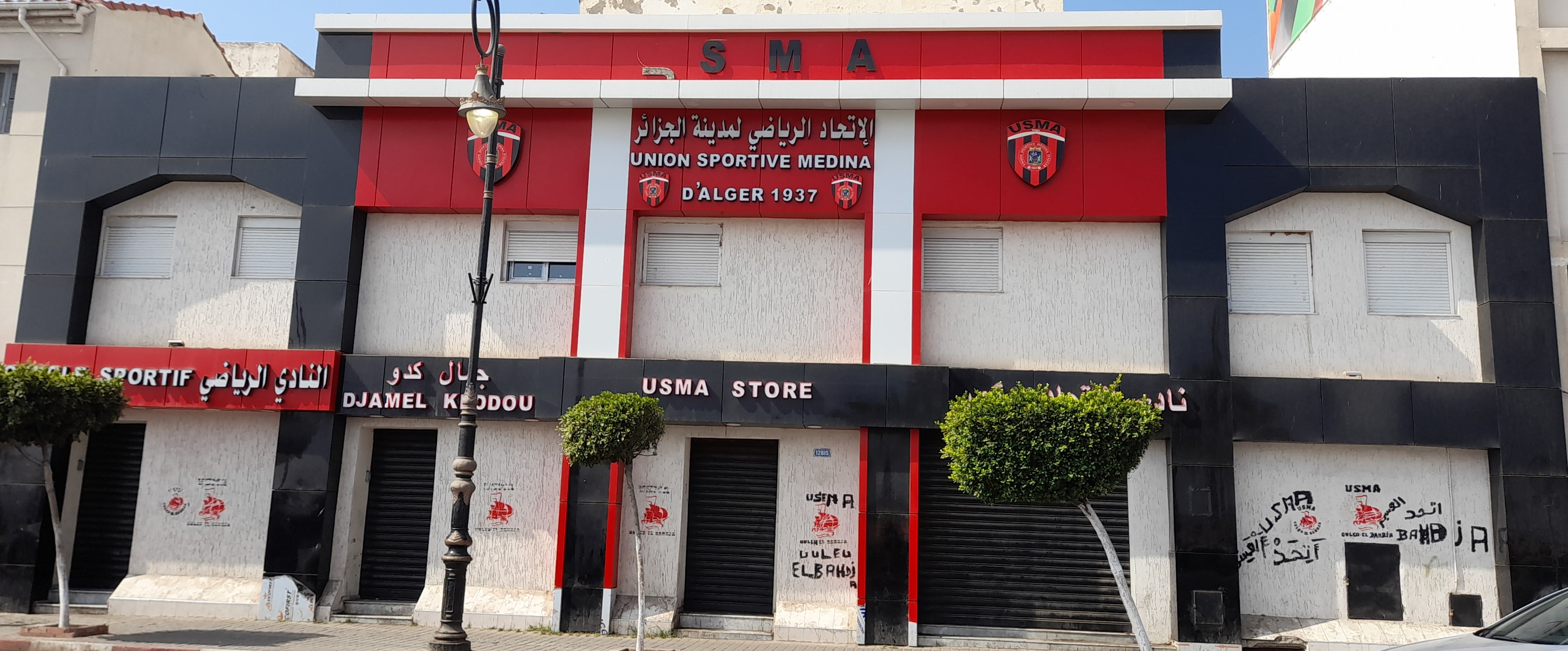
The Cercle of USM Alger where the team's supporters meet

The principal and oldest rivalry of Ouled EL Bahdja was against supporters of MC Alger, the other football club in Algiers. Other rivalries included supporters of CR Belouizdad, JS Kabylie, and USM El Harrach. The group had few local friendships; its only twinning was with the ultras of CS Constantine and WA Tlemcen.

At the international level, there is good friendship with supporters of Wydad AC of Morocco and Espérance de Tunis of Tunisia. Despite the diplomatic relations between Algeria and Morocco, supporters of the two teams are friendly—during the 2017 CAF Champions League, Wydad supporters received free stadium tickets to the game in Algeria, and vice versa for the second match. During the 2019–20 CAF Champions League, Wydad's captain Brahim Nekkach presented a special gift to Algerian footballer Mohamed Lamine Zemmamouche: a 77-year-old letter from Union Sportive Musulmane Algéroise that invited Wydad Casablanca to participate in a friendly tournament in Algeria in 1943.

== Notable supporters ==
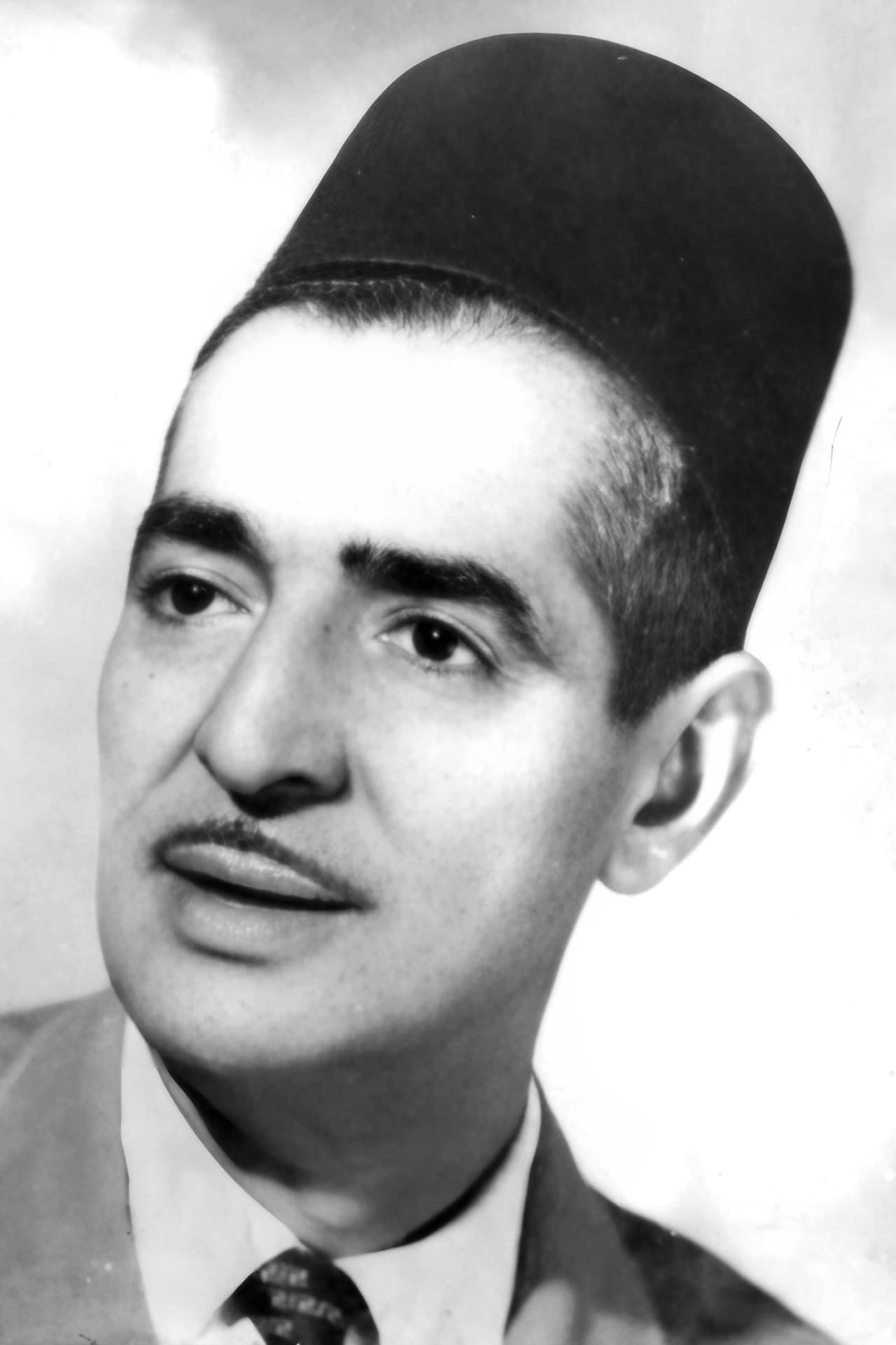
Musician El Hadj M'Hamed El Anka was one of the biggest fans of the club.

Since its founding, USM Alger has maintained a close bond with many Algerian artists and musicians who supported the club both morally and financially. Prominent figures such as El Hadj M'Hamed El Anka and El Hadj Mahfoud were known for their devotion to the club, often performing at events organized by USMA supporters in the 1930s and 1940s. In 1937, a celebratory concert marking the club’s founding featured performances by several artists, including a young El Anka. During a financial crisis in the club’s early years, artists like Farid Oujdi held benefit concerts to help sustain the team. El Anka also composed the famous song “L’Union L’USMA” in the early 1940s, considered the first Algerian patriotic sports song.

It celebrated the club's victories and praised its athletes, further cementing the cultural ties between USMA and the Algerian artistic community. This song is considered the first national artistic work to address the subject of sports in Algeria. It holds a special place in the country’s cultural history due to its pioneering nature and widespread recognition. The song was released before the one performed by Hadj M'rizek about Mouloudia d’Alger, making it the earliest known national sports themed song in Algeria. On 5 July 2023, on the 86th anniversary of the founding of USM Alger, his son Al-Hadi performed an old song written by El Hadj El Anka about USM Alger.

The name of USM Alger is closely associated with one of Algeria’s greatest chaâbi artists, El Hachemi Guerouabi, who was a passionate supporter of the club since the colonial period. His loyalty to the team remained strong after independence, and he was later named an honorary member of the club in recognition of his unwavering support. Guerouabi paid tribute to USM Alger in several performances, with one of his most iconic songs becoming a cultural anthem among the team’s supporters. The lyrics of the opening verse go:

                                   لياسما هوما لبطال           ………          حومت غزلان وفوتبال
                                       كحل واحمر يشرح البال           ………          يوالم كي يلبسوه

                       The USM Alger's is the champion     ………       A neighborhood of gazelles and football
                   Black and red that lifts the spirit     ………       It suits them when they wear it  

These lyrics reflect Guerouabi’s deep affection for the club and illustrate the powerful bond between Algerian music and football. His voice became part of the collective memory of USM Alger fans, blending art and sport into a shared cultural legacy. Abdelkader Chaou, and Mourad Djaafri are also famous supporters of USM Alger.

Among politicians, the most prominent fan was the first president of Algeria, Ahmed Ben Bella, who was a former player during the period of French colonialism. Even after being placed under house arrest following the 1965 coup, Ben Bella kept asking about USM Alger. He was the honorary president of the club until he died in 2012.

Saadi Yacef, one of the leaders of Algeria's National Liberation Front, was club president from 1972 to 1975 and also honorary president until his death in 2021. Mohamed Boudiaf, an Algerian political leader and one of the founders of the National Liberation Front, was a fan of the club. Former president of the Algerian Football Federation, Mohamed Raouraoua, is a fan of the club; however, during his tenure, Raouraoua was accused of helping USM Alger and that he was behind the team's achievement of titles.

Algerian singer and rapper Soolking is also known as a big fan of The Reds and Blacks and collaborated with Ouled EL Bahdja in releasing the song "Liberté". Parts of the music video for Soolking and Rim'K's song Lela (2021) were filmed at Omar Hamadi Stadium and featured supporters of USM Alger. Among Algerian athletes, fans include the track and field Olympic and world champion Djabir Saïd-Guerni, decathlete Larbi Bourrada, and footballer Adlène Guedioura (son of the former Algerian international striker Nacer and a former player for USM Alger).

Other notable supporters include:

- Mourad Didouche – Algerian revolutionary, and a political and military figure of the Algerian War of Independence
- Mustapha Laribi – Algerian actor
- Ahmed Benaissa – Algerian actor
- Adel Amrouche – Algerian football manager
- Abderrahmane Hammad – Algerian former Minister of Youth and Sports, member of the Algerian Olympic Committee, and a former track and field athlete
- Abdelkader Bouamer – Algerian Paralympic judoka champion.
