= Wlad Lahlal =

Algerian television series

- اولاد الحلال
- Genre: Drama; Action
- Written by: Rafika Boujday
- Directed by: Nasir al-Din al-Suhaili
- Starring: Abdelkader Djeriou; Youssef Sahiri; Mustapha Laribi; Malika Bilbay; Mohamed Khassani; Imane Nawel; Solidim
- Theme music composer: Mehdi Al Moulhi
- Opening theme: Abdallah Kourd; Haifa Rahim
- Country of origin: Algeria
- Original language: Algerian Arabic
- No. of seasons: 1
- No. of episodes: 28

Production
- Producer: Art MCC 8
- Production location: Oran
- Running time: 35 minutes
- Production company: Echorouk Group

Original release
- Network: Echorouk Plus; Echorouk TV
- Release: 6 May – 2 June 2019

Wlad Lahlal (Arabic: اولاد الحلال; transl. Halal Sons) is an Algerian television series, produced and broadcast by Echorouk Group, and directed by Nasir al-Din al-Suhaili. It premiered in 2019 on Echorouk TV and Echorouk Plus. It is considered to be one among the most successful series in the history of Algeria; it is also considered to be the best dramatic production during Ramadan 2019, and is the most watched on YouTube, where it was viewed 112 million times via the Echorouk Plus channel. The last episode of the series Wlad Lahlal provoked angry and sympathetic reactions to his hero, Merzak, which was played by his role as an artist, Abdelkader Djeriou, and made them demand a second part, The series ended with a mysterious shot after Marzak was wounded by a gunshot at the abdominal level, which some interpreted as the death of the hero, which caused their anger and grief, and some people did not accept him.

It stars Abdelkader Djeriou, Mustapha Laribi, Youssef Sahiri, Imane Nawel, Mohamed Khassani and Malika Bilbay in lead roles.

== Plot ==
The beginning of the story is an attempt by Marzaq with his brother Zino to search for his family's past in the neighborhood of Al Darb in Oran Merzak thinks his sister still lives here right after his arrival, asked his brother not to link any romantic relationship with any girl from the neighborhood because it is possible to be their sister, As for their work and how they earn money is by stealing the rich who earn their money through fraud and theft, One day there was a big fight in the neighborhood and Khaled was present, a big drug dealer living in Algiers, After he saw the great popularity of them, Offer them to work for him but Merzak rejected that because he doesn't like to work for others.

Although he asked his brother Zino not to have any affair with a girl from the neighborhood, he was impressed with Leila and tried to convince Merzak that it is impossible to be their sister However, Leila placed a condition a shop in the middle of the city even accept to marry him, Then Khalid drug dealer and while touring in one of the ports he met Yassin His real name Yahya and after hearing his story and searching for his brothers He asked him to work with him then asked him about what was working there, Khalid said to him in the drugs then accepted the job and asked him to help him search for his brothers

Yassin, who has a university level and specialized in computers and is a hacker of the high level, where he did a difficult task when he hacked Khaled enemy's computer Youssef, where he got all his secrets to become the most important man in his work What he did made his life in danger by Youssef, who became weak in front of Khalid because of what he leaked, Return to Marzak where Ridha came and asked for his opinion About Dalila and if he loves her especially because she is impressed to him after that Merzak went to her mother Zoulikha About Dalila and marriage with Redha later in the wedding Taoufik killed Redha until now is not known why he killed him

Later Taoufik kidnapped the child Rabie, a lover of Merzak, his enemy and after that his mother filed a complaint to the police about his disappearance and when Merzak learned about it, he promised to find it and after investigations and surveillance he was able to know that Taoufik was the one who kidnapped him. to find him in a shack in case, he lamented it to take him to the hospital. Where he Recognizes the Dr. Dalia, who became later his lover then received a call from Taoufik's wife, who told him that he is at home, but Taoufik heard her Where he gets her out of the house and tried to kill her, but Merzak arrived at the right time And after he had received a beating because of killing his close friend Redha he called Redha's mother and asked her if she wanted to kill him, but she refused.

In the last episode, Khalid was betrayal by Youssef, while receiving a shipment of drugs, he was arrested by the police with Zino On the other hand, Merzak was planning to steal Marddasi, the father of his lover Dalia, the drug trade leader in Algeria, After learning of his brother Zeno's prison, he decided not to complete the mission, but his brother Yahya and his cousin Karim persuaded him to continue the mission. Later, Mirzaq agreed with the wife of Khalid, to pay four ali Her brother a large of money in return for the police to recognize that the drugs are for Khalid only and that Zeno is innocent and This is what happened, Then they were able to find out where their sister Yosra lives when they saw her and wanted to go and get to know her, Marzak went down and told his brothers that it was better not to know them because of the problems they were in and also the possibility of taking revenge on them. Especially after seeing her happy with her husband and daughter.

== Criticism and praise in the series ==
The series has been criticized by some media And most of them Ennahar TV which it considered offensive to the people of Oran, especially where it was produced in the old neighborhood Al derb where it said that people of Oran are demanding to stop broadcasting after, later came star of the series The actor Abdelkader Djeriou denied the news of the protest of the inhabitants of the Al derb neighborhood in Oran on the picture he presented in "Wlad Lahlal" series, which is still being filmed and accomplished as a den of the negative and negative social phenomena. Pointing out that this protest is practiced by a well-known competition channel meant Ennahar TV wants to pull the rug from the series, which achieved the highest proportion of viewership since the broadcast of the first episode, there were also interviews with people of Oran about the series They all praised him, and said that were lucky to be filming in their city.

== Cast ==
- Abdelkader Djeriou as Marzaq
- Youssef Sahiri as Zino
- Ahmed Benaissa as the father of Marzaq, Zino and Yahya
- Amine Mohamed Djemal as Yahya
- Fadéla Hachemaoui as the Mother of Khaled and Salima
- Mustapha Laribi as Khaled
- Imane Nawel as Malika Khaled's wife
- Aziz Boukrouni as Ali Malika's brother and Salima's Husband
- Fatima Zahra Hasnawi as Salima Ali's wife
- Mohamed Khassani as Redha
- Malika Belbey as Zoulikha the Mother of Leila and Dalila
- Souhila Malem as Leila
- Haifa Rahim as Dalila
- Hamida Sbaa as Adoptive mother of Yahya
- Ahmed Medah as Taoufik
- Meriem Oukbir as Dalya
- Jalab Benabdallah as Faraj
- Ramadan Daoudi as Fathi
- Solidim as Aboubaker
- Yasmine Ammari as Yousra Sister of Merzaq, Zino and Yahya
- Mony Boualem as
- Maryam Amir as
- Mohamed Fremahdi as Youssef
- Abubaker Sadik Benaissa as Karim
- Noura Akboubi as
- Rabie Ajaout as
- Redha City 16 as Redha

== Series overview ==
Season	Episodes	TV Channel	Originally aired	
Season	Episodes	TV Channel	Premiere	Finale
1	28	Echorouk Plus; Echorouk TV	May 6, 2019	June 2, 2019
