= J8 =

J8, J08, J 8 or J-8 may refer to:

- J8 (TV show), an Algerian comedic television show broadcast on Echourouk TV
- Jeep J8, a military vehicle based on the Jeep Wrangler platform
- Jaecoo J8, a mid-size SUV made by Chery
- Shenyang J-8, a high-speed, high-altitude Chinese-built single-seat interceptor fighter aircraft
- Junkers J 8, the internal designation for the 1917 German CL.I ground-attack aircraft
- DSER Class J8, a Dublin and South Eastern Railway Irish steam locomotive
- HMS Bayfield (J08) / HMCS Bayfield (J08), a 1940 British then Canadian Bangor-class minesweeper
- Johor State Route J8, a major road in Johor, Malaysia
- S/2000 J 8, a former name for Megaclite, a natural satellite of Jupiter
- S/2001 J 8, a former name for Kale, a retrograde irregular satellite of Jupiter
- S/2003 J 8, a former name for Hegemone, a natural satellite of Jupiter
- Samsung Galaxy J8, a smartphone made by Samsung
- Johnson solid J8, the elongated square pyramid

and also :

- Junior 8, a junior global summit
- Berjaya Air IATA airline designator
- Saint Vincent and the Grenadines aircraft registration code
- J 8, a Swedish designation for the 1937 Gloster Gladiator fighter aircraft
- J8, the Scrabble tile of which there is only one in each game set.
- J-8, the Joint Force Structure, Resources, & Assessment Directorate of the Joint Chiefs of Staff

== See also ==
- 8J (disambiguation)
