= Asmar (name) =

Asmar (Arabic: الأسمر) is a unisex given name and a surname which is mostly used in the Arab world. It has two meanings: brown and a tanned-skinned person.

Notable people with the name include:

== Given name ==
- Asmar Asmar (born 1930), Lebanese Assyrian physician and politician
- Asmar Bilal (born 1997), American football player
- Aline Asmar d'Amman (born 1975), Lebanon-born architect
- Asmar Latin Sani (c. 1975 or 1976–2003), Indonesian al-Qaeda member

== Surname ==
- Abd As-Salam Al-Asmar (1455–1575), Muslim saint
- Andre Afram Asmar, American hip hop producer
- Driss El-Asmar (born 1975), Moroccan football player
- Fouzi El Asmar (1937–2013), Palestinian American journalist, writer and poet
- Hamad Al-Asmar (born 1987), Jordanian football player
- Hassan El Asmar (1959–2011), Egyptian actor and singer
- Maria Theresa Asmar (1804–c. 1870), Noble Iraqi Assyrian, traveller and writer
- Maya Hossam Asmar, known as Maya Nasri (born 1976), Lebanese singer
- Nidal Asmar (born 1969), Lebanese-born Australian sport shooter
- Simon Asmar (1943–2019), Lebanese television director and producer
- Yoland Asmar (1930–1988), Syrian actress and singer

== See also ==
- Asmar (disambiguation)
