= Teguia =

Teguia is a surname. Notable people with the surname include:

- Cedric Teguia (born 2001), Spanish footballer
- Tariq Teguia (born 1966), Algerian film director, screenwriter and producer
