= J8 (talk show) =

Algerian talk show

- Promotional poster for J8
- Arabic: اليوم الثامن
- Genre: Talk show; Comedy
- Created by: Cyril Hanouna
- Based on: Touche pas à mon poste !
- Presented by: Farah Yasmine Nia
- Starring: Merouane Guerouabi; Zoubir Belhor; Chemseddine Lamrani
- Country of origin: Algeria
- Original languages: Arabic; French
- No. of seasons: 1 (in production)

Production
- Production locations: Algiers, Algeria
- Camera setup: Multiple
- Running time: Banijay International
- Production companies: Not Found Prod (by Wellcom Advertising); Banijay International

Original release
- Network: Echourouk TV
- Release: 2017

Related
- System DZ; Douga Douga; Le Trottoir

Huitième Jour (Arabic: اليوم الثامن, al-Yawm ath-Thāmin), or simply J8, is an Algerian live talk show that debuted 2017 on Echourouk TV. It deals with the news of the week, focusing on media news. It is the local adaptation of the French series Touche pas à mon poste !.

It hosted by Farah Yasmine Nia, with a group of columnists, including Merouane Guerouabi, Zoubir Belhor and Chemseddine Lamrani.

A casting was announced by Not Found Prod on November 3, 2016 to choose other columnists for the show.

== Concept ==
The idea of the show is simple: to see or to review striking pictures of the week in the best spirit possible and with good rhythm. But it's not a simple zapping because Farah Yasmine and her team of columnists discuss new or polemical happenings and events without forgetting the pictures to not miss, with some special headings. Two or three guests talk about their life and their favourite show during each J8 episode, and sometimes, it's an opportunity to do some type of challenges.

== On-air staff ==
=== Host ===
J8 will be hosted by Farah Yasmine Nia, who presented entertainment/musical programs Qahwa Hlib Party (2013) on El Djazairia then Zik Mag on KBC. She also participated on the first season of the reality show Mouziaa al-Arab.

=== Columnists ===
- Merouane Guerouabi, also known as MGDZ, comedian (Bint Walad DZ, Bint Walad 2, Bibiche & Bibicha) and TV host (Fi Darna).
- Zoubir Belhor, comedian (Bibiche & Bibicha) and TV host (Zoubir Show) and reality TV participant (Arab Casting).
- Chemseddine Lamrani, also known as DZjoker, humorist (3leche, DZ Connexion), scenarist (Dar El Bahdja, Sultan Achour 10) and TV host (Hkaytek Hkaya, Fi Darna).

=== Guests ===
The show will generally welcome two guests. They could be hosts, journalists, singers, actors, humorists or politicians.

== See also ==
- Touche pas à mon poste !
