= 1900 Atlantic hurricane season =

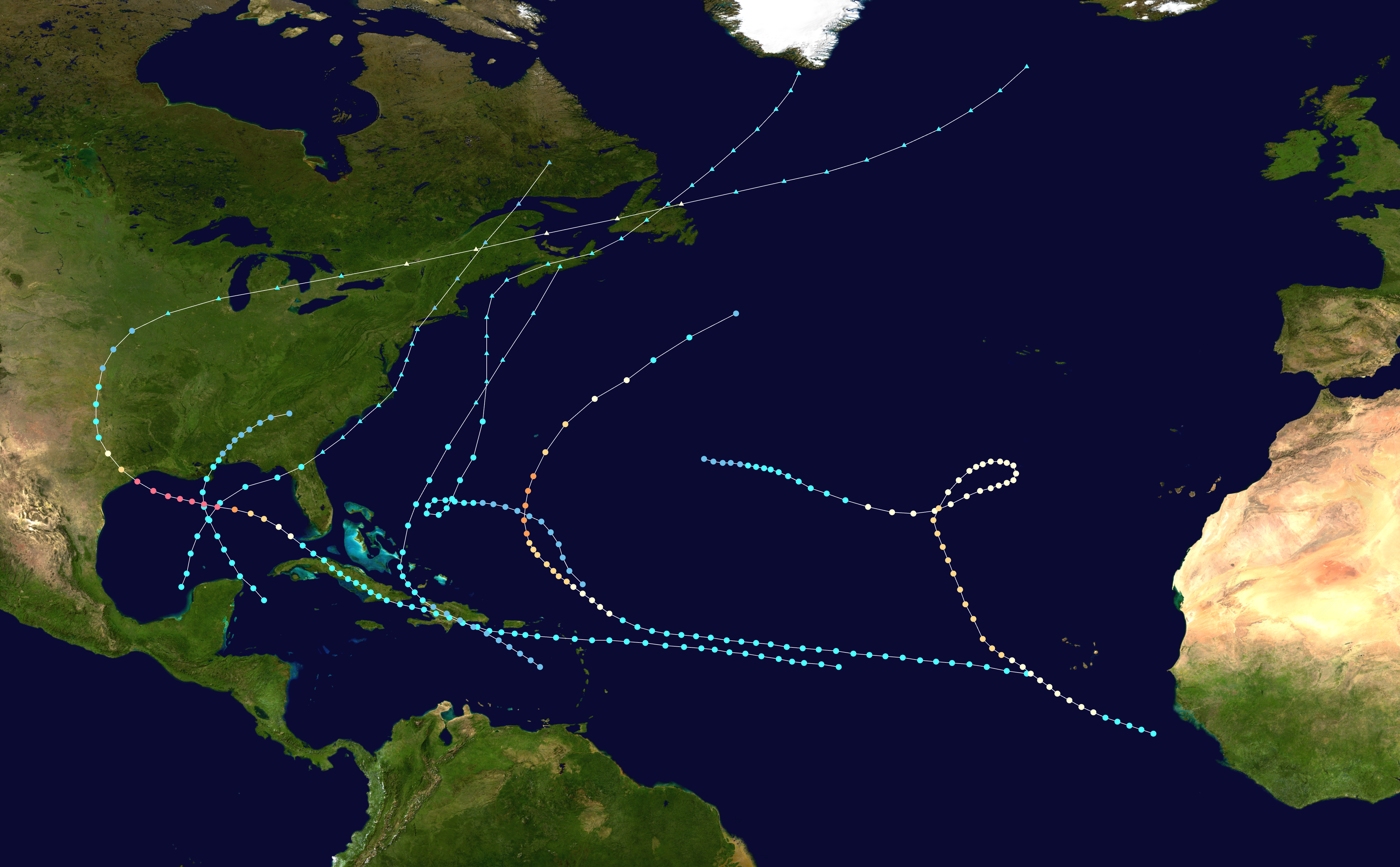
- Season summary map

Seasonal boundaries
- First system formed: January 17, 1900
- Last system dissipated: October 28, 1900

Strongest storm
- Name: "Galveston"
  - Maximum winds: 145 mph (230 km/h) (1-minute sustained)
  - Lowest pressure: 936 mbar (hPa; 27.64 inHg)

Seasonal statistics
- Total depressions: 10
- Total storms: 7
- Hurricanes: 3
- Major hurricanes (Cat. 3+): 2
- Total fatalities: 8,000-12,000
- Total damage: At least $35.5 million (1900 USD)

Related articles
- 1900–09 Pacific hurricane seasons; 1900 Pacific typhoon season; 1900s North Indian Ocean cyclone seasons

The 1900 Atlantic hurricane season was a below average yet incredibly devastating hurricane season which featured the Galveston hurricane, the deadliest natural disaster in the United States history. A total of 10 tropical cyclones formed, seven of which intensified into a tropical storm. Three of those made landfall in the United States. The first system was initially observed over the central Atlantic Ocean on January 17, while the final storm transitioned into an extratropical cyclone on October 28. These dates fall within the period with the most tropical cyclone activity in the Atlantic. Every storm of the season except the seventh system existed simultaneously with another tropical cyclone.

Of the season's seven tropical storms, three reached hurricane status. Furthermore, two of those three strengthened into major hurricanes, which are Category 3 or higher on the modern-day Saffir–Simpson hurricane wind scale. The strongest cyclone of the season, the first hurricane, peaked at Category 4 strength with maximum sustained winds of 145 mph (230 km/h). Upon striking Texas shortly after peak intensity, it produced a devastating storm surge in the Galveston area, with extensive damage and at least 8,000 fatalities. Nicknamed the "1900 Galveston hurricane", it remains the deadliest natural disaster in the history of the United States. The hurricane overall caused about $35.5 million (1.9 billion USD) in damage. (Note: All damage figures are in 1900 USD, unless otherwise noted) Impact from other tropical cyclones was generally minor, though the remnants of Tropical Storm Five resulted in one death and at least $100,000 in damage in Atlantic Canada.

== Season summary ==
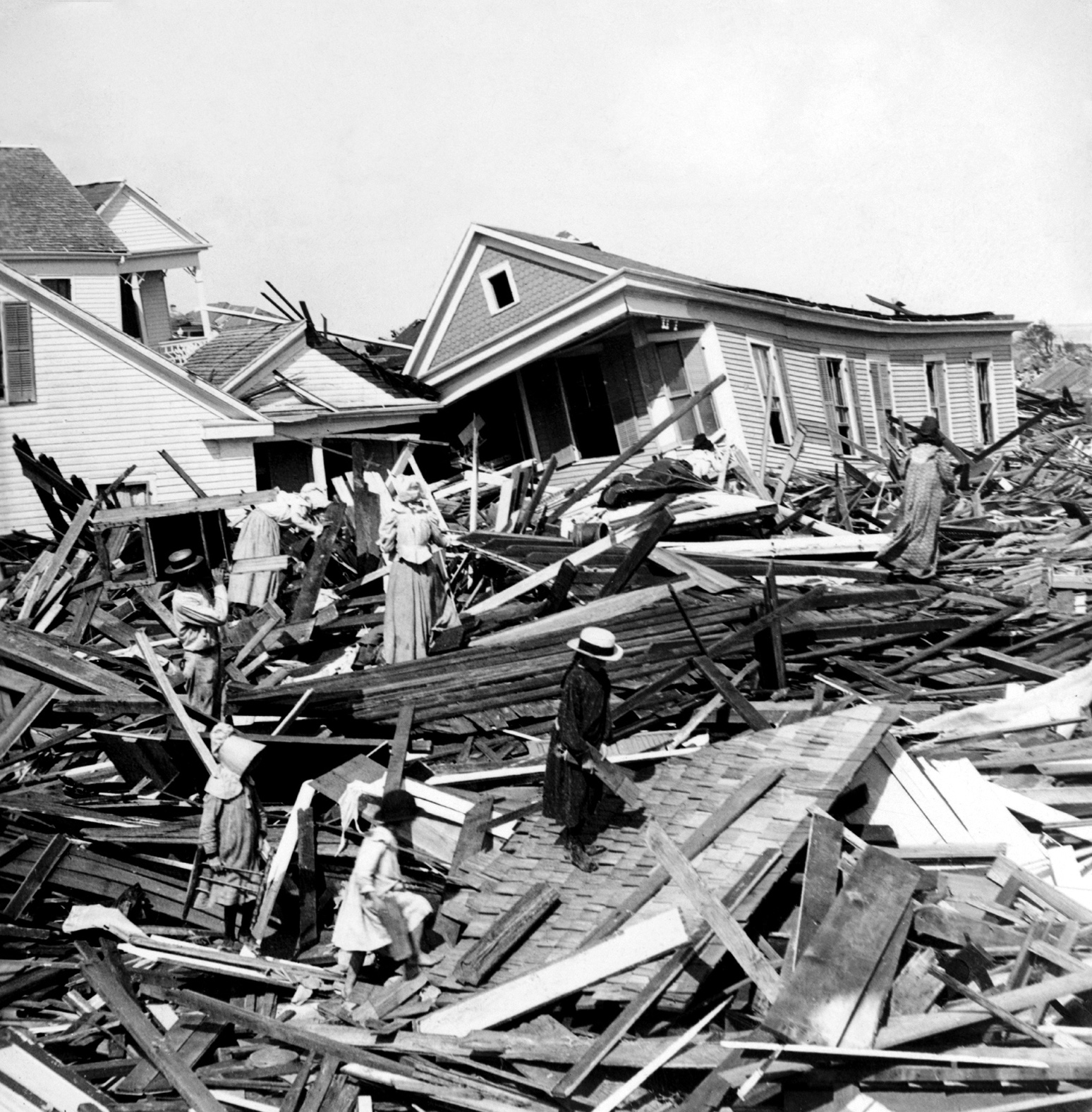
Damage from the 1900 Galveston hurricane in Galveston, Texas

Tropical cyclogenesis began with the development of a tropical depression over the central Atlantic on January 17. After the depression transitioned into an extratropical cyclone on the following day, the next system did not develop until June 9, while just north of the Lesser Antilles. This coincided with the formation of a third tropical depression over the northeastern Gulf of Mexico on the same day. The former moved generally north-northwestward for several days until becoming extratropical northeast of the Bahamas on June 17, while the latter made landfall in southeastern Louisiana on June 12, two days before dissipating over Mississippi. However, the season's first such of at least tropical storm intensity did not develop until August 27 while well west of Cape Verde. This was abnormally late, as the average date of development of the first tropical storm between 1944 and 1996 was July 11. In comparison, the latest date of the first tropical storm during the satellite era was Hurricane Anita on August 29, 1977. However, this storm, the "Galveston hurricane", was the most intense tropical cyclone of the season, peaking as a Category 4 hurricane with maximum sustained winds of 145 mph (230 km/h) and a minimum barometric pressure of 936 mbar (27.6 inHg). During the month of September, which is the climatological peak of hurricane season, three additional tropical cyclones formed, two of which were hurricanes. After the third hurricane dissipated on September 23, activity went dormant for nearly two weeks, until the fifth tropical storm formed near the Lesser Antilles on October 4. As it was becoming extratropical, a sixth tropical cyclone developed in the Bay of Campeche on October 10. The final system formed in the eastern Caribbean Sea, crossed Hispaniola, and transitioned into an extratropical cyclone between Bermuda and the East Coast of the United States on October 28.

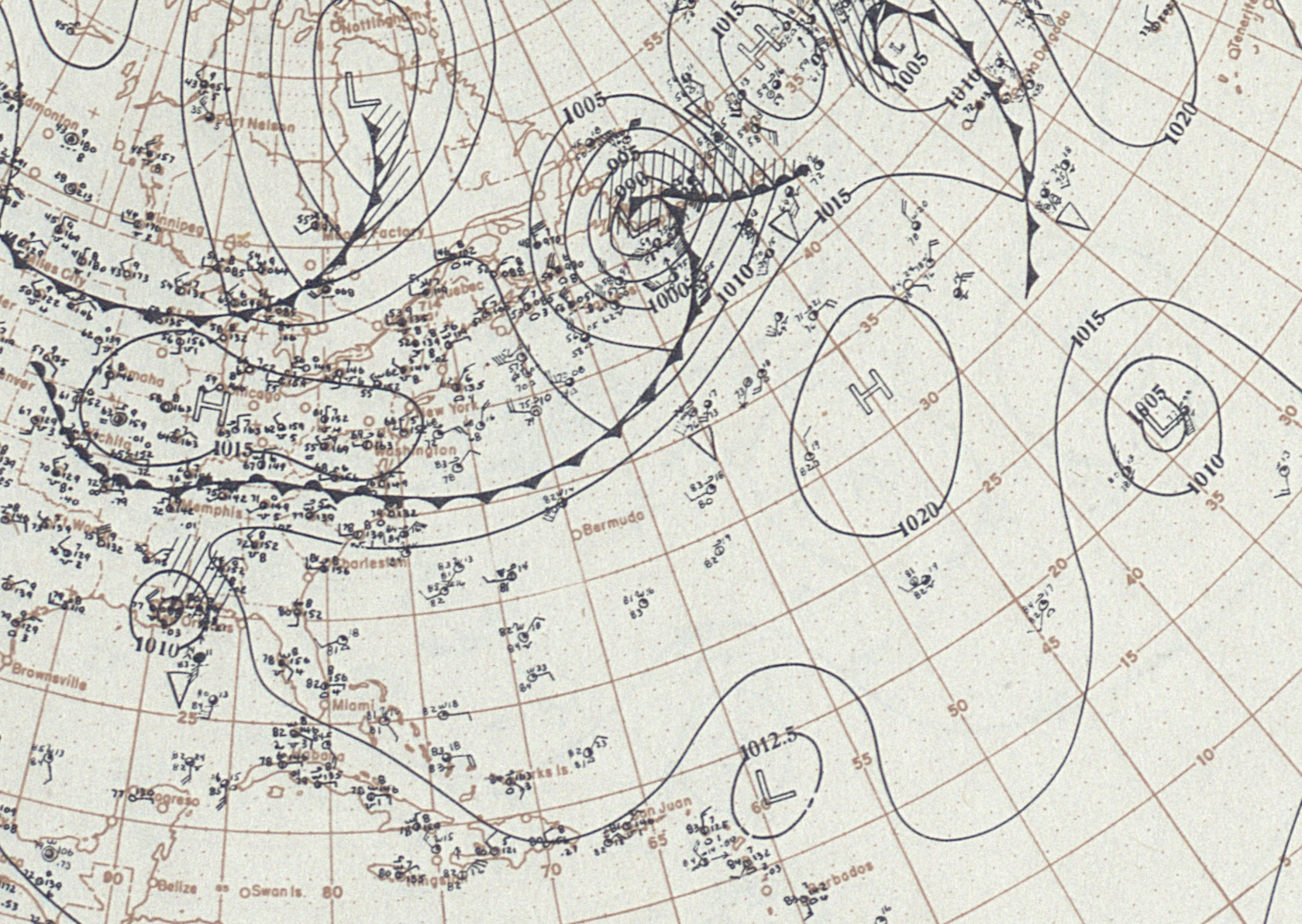
Surface weather analysis on September 13, 1900, showing three Atlantic tropical cyclones active simultaneously, with the extratropical remnants of the Galveston hurricane (top) southeast of Newfoundland and moving into the North Atlantic Ocean

By far, the storm that caused the most devastation was Hurricane One, nicknamed the "Galveston hurricane". Its storm surge submerged much of Galveston Island in Texas, killing between 6,000 and 12,000 people. Official estimates put the death toll at approximately 8,000. As a result, it is currently the deadliest natural disaster in the history of the United States. At the time, it was also the second deadliest tropical cyclone in the Atlantic basin, behind only the Great Hurricane of 1780, which killed at least 22,000 people in the Lesser Antilles. However, the Galveston hurricane was surpassed in 1998 by Hurricane Mitch, which caused more than 11,000 fatalities in Central America. The storm was also among the deadliest in Canada, where at least 102 people were killed. Few other tropical cyclones during the 1900 Atlantic hurricane season caused any damage or fatalities. However, the extratropical remnants of Tropical Storm Five brought moderate damage to Canada. The storm caused 1 fatality and about $100,000 in losses, mainly to railroads.

The season's activity was reflected with an accumulated cyclone energy (ACE) rating of 81. ACE is a metric used to express the energy used by a tropical cyclone during its lifetime. Therefore, a storm with a longer duration will have high values of ACE. It is only calculated at six-hour increments in which specific tropical and subtropical systems are either at or above sustained wind speeds of 39 mph (63 km/h), which is the threshold for tropical storm intensity. Thus, tropical depressions are not included here.

== Systems ==
=== Hurricane One ===
The Great Galveston hurricane of 1900 or Great Storm of 1900 or 1900 Storm

- Category 4 hurricane (SSHWS)
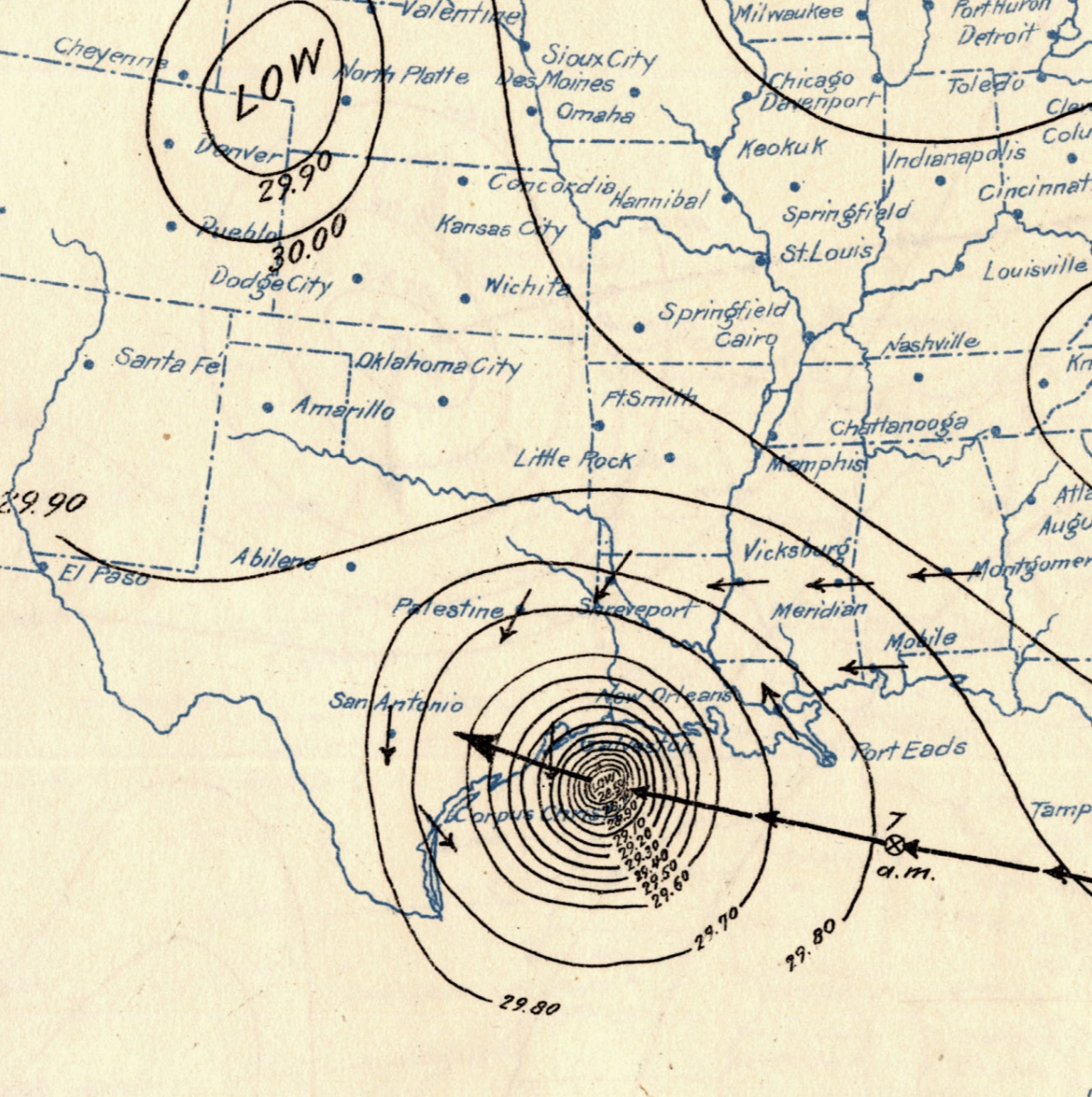
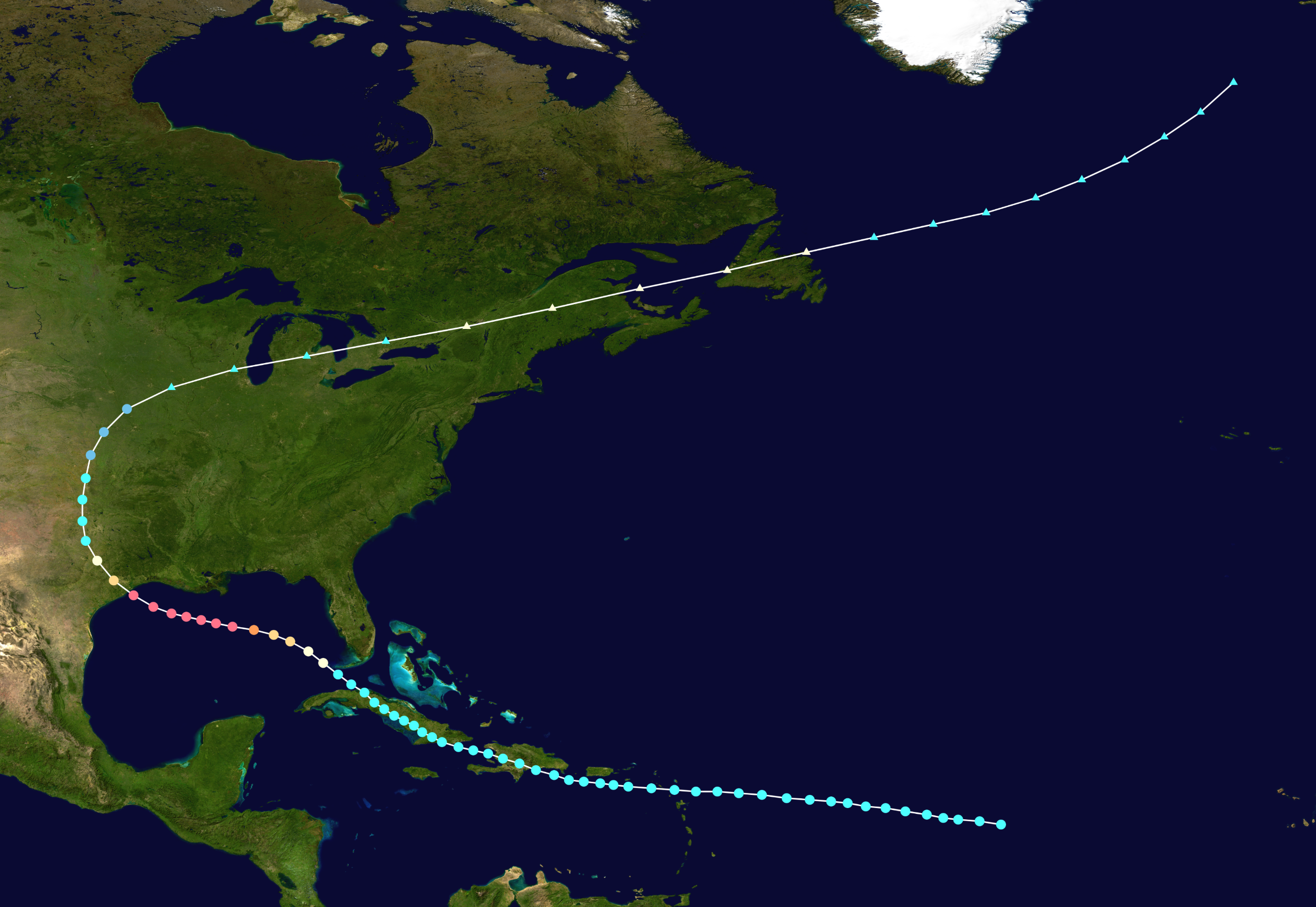
- Duration: August 27 – September 11
- Peak intensity: 145 mph (230 km/h) (1-min); 936 mbar (hPa)

Early on August 27, a ship encountered the first tropical storm of the season, while located about 1,160 mi (1,865 km) east of the southernmost islands of Cape Verde. It slowly strengthened while moving steadily west-northwestward and entered the northeastern Caribbean on August 30. The storm moved south of Puerto Rico and made landfall in Dominican Republic as a weak tropical storm on September 2. It weakened slightly while crossing Hispaniola, before re-emerging into the Caribbean Sea later that day. On September 3, the cyclone struck modern day Santiago de Cuba Province and then slowly drifted along the southern coast of Cuba. Upon reaching the Gulf of Mexico on September 6, the storm strengthened into a hurricane, while situated near Dry Tortugas.

Significant intensification followed and the system peaked as a Category 4 hurricane with winds of 145 mph (230 km/h) on September 8. Early on the next day, it made landfall near modern-day Jamaica Beach, Texas, with winds of 140 mph (225 km/h). Around that time, its minimum barometric pressure of 936 mbar (27.6 inHg) was observed. It weakened quickly after moving inland and fell to tropical storm intensity late on September 9. The storm turned east-northeastward and became extratropical over Iowa on September 11. The extratropical system strengthened while accelerating across the Midwestern United States, Ontario, Quebec, northern New England, and then New Brunswick before reaching the Gulf of Saint Lawrence on September 13. Later that day, the extratropical remnants struck Newfoundland. It then reached the far North Atlantic Ocean and began to weaken, finally dissipating near Iceland on September 15.

The storm brought heavy rainfall to Cuba, with up to 12.58 in (320 mm) in a 24‑hour period in the city of Santiago de Cuba. Much of Florida experienced tropical storm force winds, though no damage occurred. Hurricane-force winds and storm surge inundated portions of southern Louisiana, though no significant damage or fatalities were reported. In Texas, strong winds were reported in the Galveston area, reaching 120 mph (195 km/h). Storm surge cresting between 8 and 15 ft (2.4 and 4.6 m) inundated the entirety of Galveston Island. Every house sustained damage, with at least 3,636 destroyed. In Galveston alone, approximately 10,000 were left homeless, out of a total population of 37,000. The actual death toll is unknown, though it is thought to be at least 8,000. Thus, the 1900 Galveston hurricane was the deadliest natural disaster in the history of the United States. Property damage from the storm in Galveston alone was estimated at $30 million. Farther north, the storm and its remnants continued to produce heavy rains and gusty winds across the Midwestern United States, Mid-Atlantic, and New England. The storm downed telegraph wires, signs, and trees in several states and caused 15 deaths in Ohio; 2 each in Illinois and New York; and 1 each in Massachusetts and Missouri. The remnants brought severe impact to Canada. In the province of Ontario, damage reached about $1.35 million, with about $1 million incurred to crops. There were at least 107 deaths in Canada, mostly due to sunken vessels near Newfoundland and the French territory of Saint Pierre and Miquelon.

=== Hurricane Two ===
- Category 3 hurricane (SSHWS)
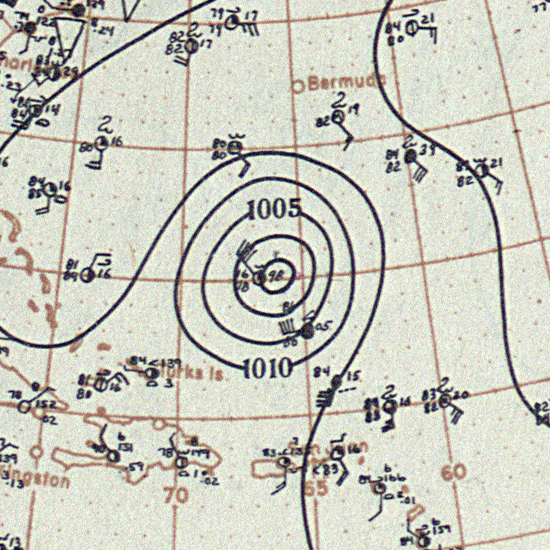
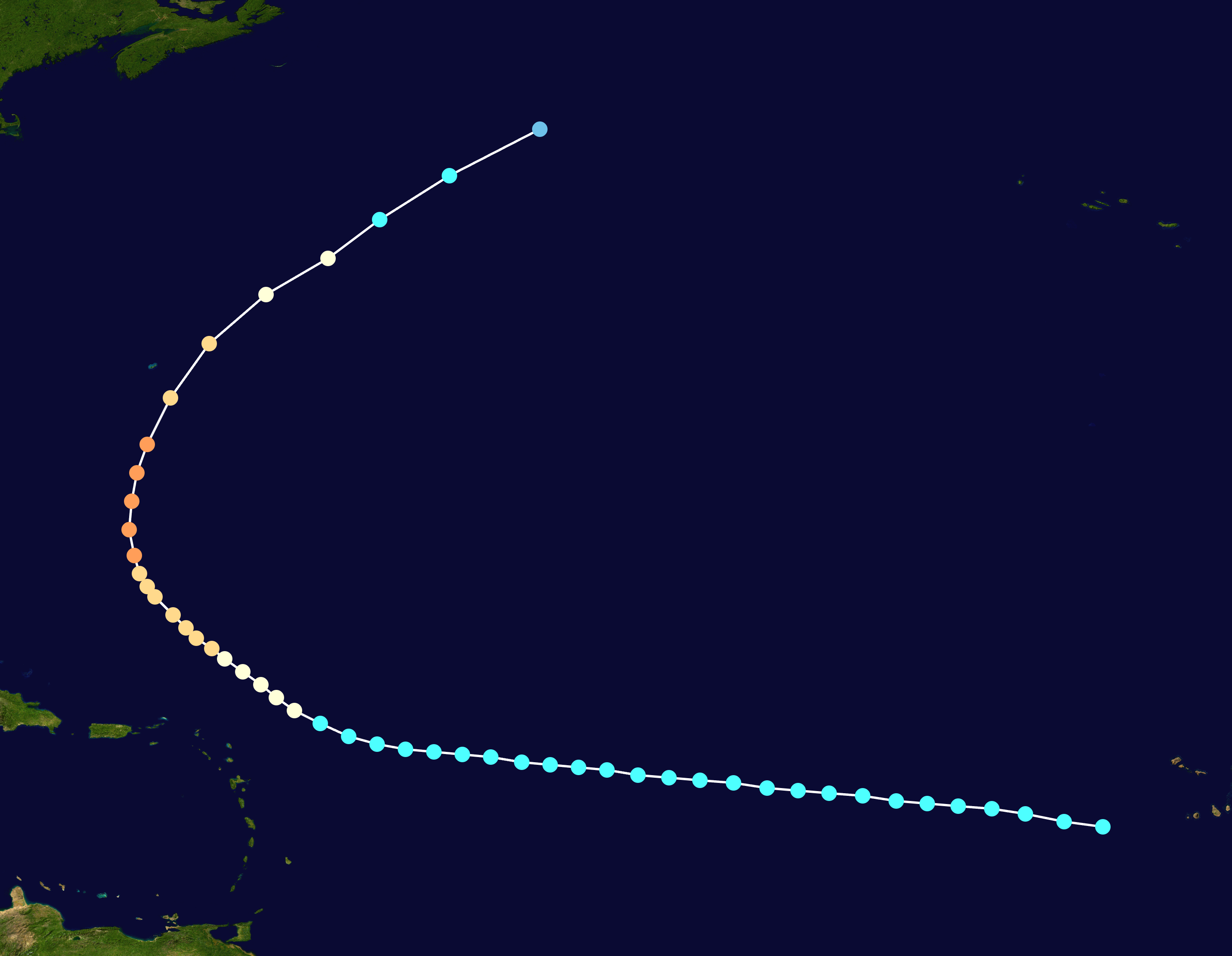
- Duration: September 7 – September 19
- Peak intensity: 120 mph (195 km/h) (1-min);

A ship reported strong gales in the vicinity of Cape Verde on September 7. Thus, HURDAT indicates that the second tropical storm of the season formed early on September 7, while located about 220 mi (355 km) west of the southernmost islands of Cape Verde. It quickly strengthened to a strong tropical storm on September 8, but then maintained that intensity for nearly five days. The system was not tracked until being encountered by the steamship Hungaria on September 13, at which time it was already a hurricane. Originally, the system was listed as Hurricane Four, it was operationally believed to have developed after the next two tropical cyclones. Later on September 14, it strengthened further into a Category 2 hurricane while moving northwestward.

Re-curving northward, the system intensified into a Category 3 hurricane on September 16. At 1800 UTC, the hurricane peaked with maximum sustained winds of 120 mph (195 km/h). However, it weakened to a Category 2 hurricane later on September 17. Shortly thereafter, the storm bypassed southeast of Bermuda, bring gusty winds but little impact. It then re-curved northeastward. The system weakened back to a Category 1 hurricane on September 18. Later that day, it weakened to a tropical storm and then to a tropical depression early on September 19. The storm persisted for several more hours, until dissipated about 390 mi (630 km) southeast of Cape Race, Newfoundland.

=== Hurricane Three ===
- Category 2 hurricane (SSHWS)
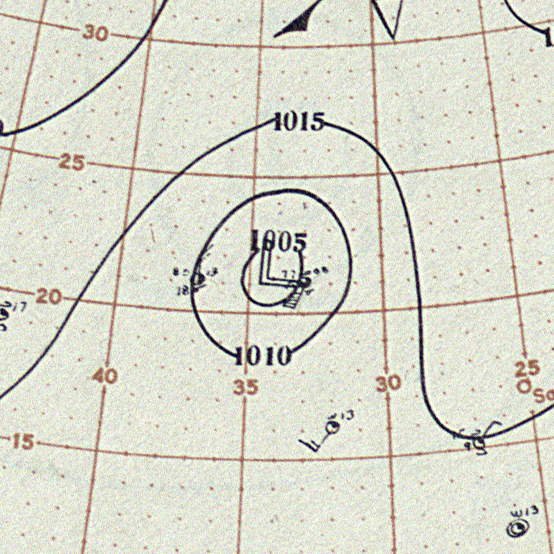
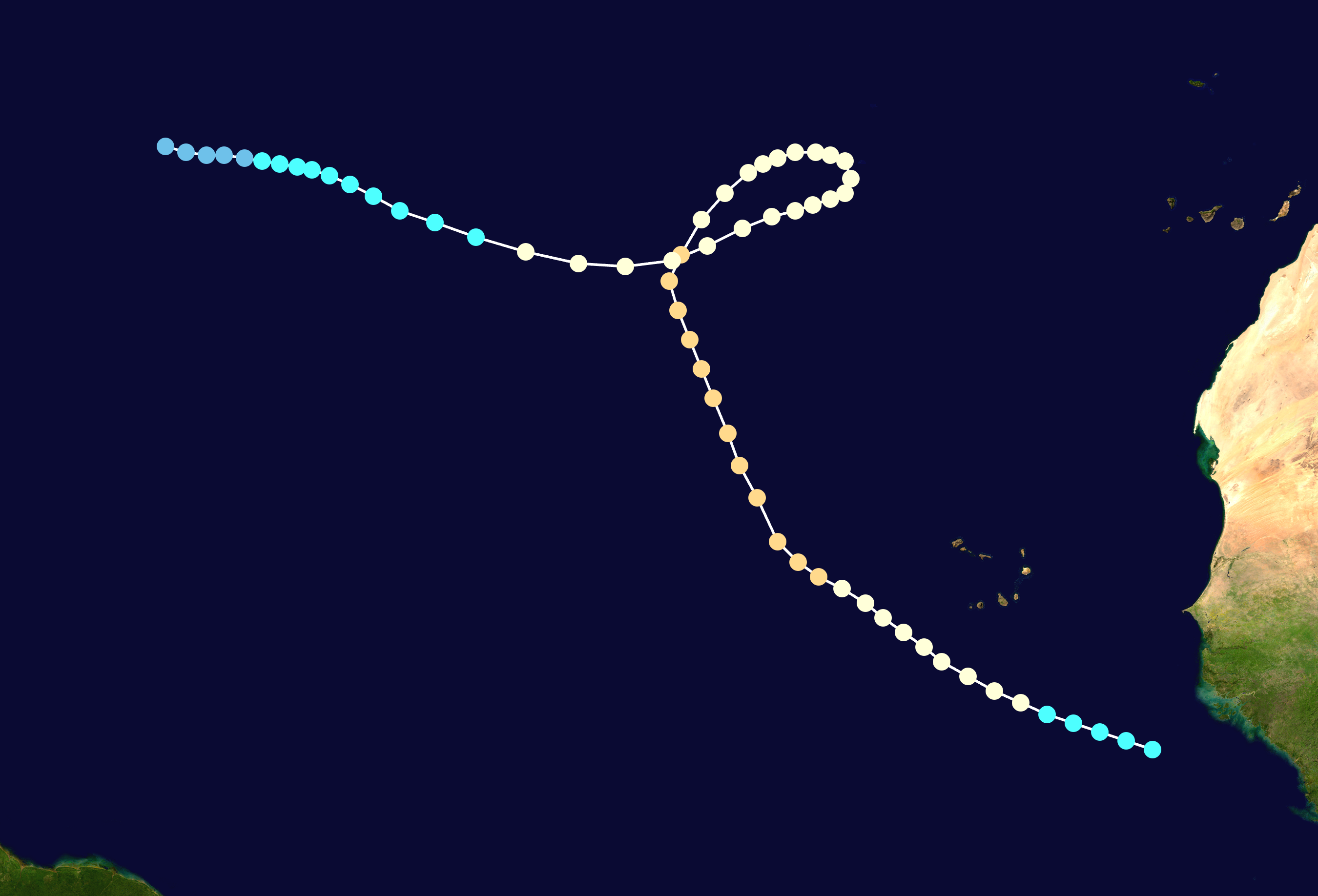
- Duration: September 8 – September 23
- Peak intensity: 100 mph (155 km/h) (1-min);

Ship reports indicates that a tropical storm developed on September 8 at 1200 UTC, while located about 175 mi (282 km) east of the Bissagos Islands, Guinea-Bissau. The storm gradually strengthened as it was heading west-northward. By late on September 9, the system strengthened into a hurricane. It passed southwest of Cape Verde on the following day. The storm then intensified slowly, becoming a Category 2 hurricane early on September 12. Around that time, the hurricane peaked with maximum sustained winds of 100 mph (155 km/h). Later on September 12, it re-curved north-northwestward. After turning north-northeast, the storm began executing a small cyclonic loop on September 14.

A weakening trend soon occurred, with it weakening to a Category 1 hurricane early on September 15. About four days later, the hurricane completed its cyclonic loop and then headed west-northwestward. The system weakened to a tropical storm early on September 20. During the next few days, the storm decelerated and turned westward. Late on September 22, it weakened to a tropical depression. The depression continued westward, until dissipating at 1800 UTC on September 23, while located about 745 mi (1,200 km) east-southeast of Bermuda.

=== Tropical Storm Four ===
- Tropical storm (SSHWS)
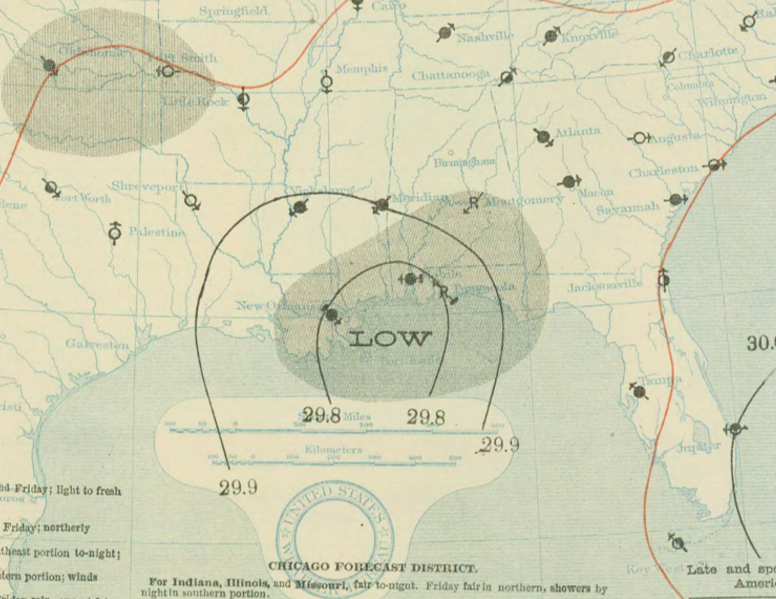
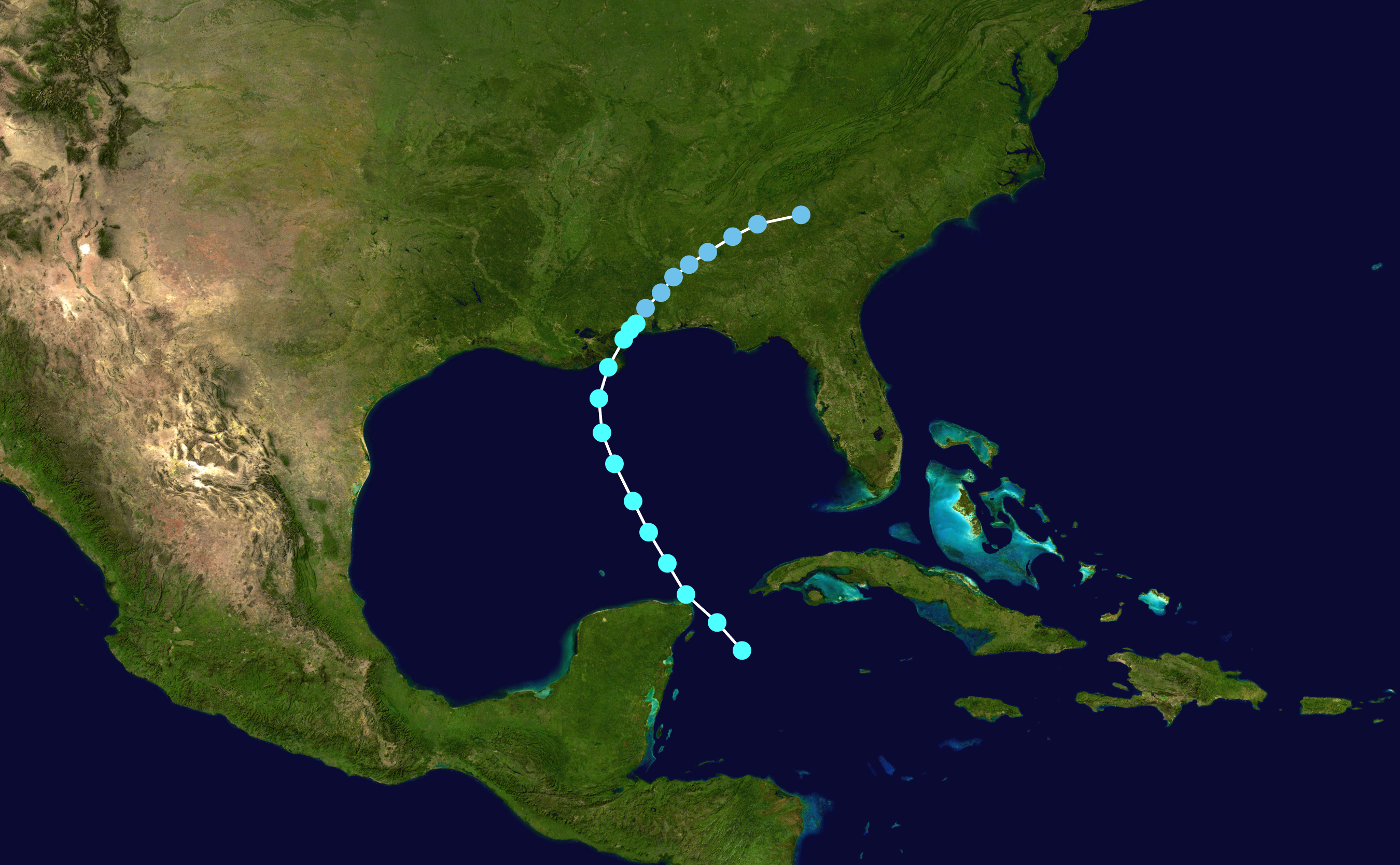
- Duration: September 11 – September 15
- Peak intensity: 50 mph (85 km/h) (1-min); ≤1005 mbar (hPa)

Weather maps first indicated a tropical storm over the northwestern Caribbean Sea on September 11. Heading northwestward, the system brushed the Yucatán Peninsula as weak tropical storm. Late on September 11, it peaked with maximum sustained winds of 50 mph (85 km/h) and a minimum barometric pressure of 1,005 mbar (29.7 inHg), while located in the southeastern Gulf of Mexico. Early on September 13, the storm re-curved northeastward and began weakening. At 0600 UTC on September 13, it made landfall near Venice, Louisiana, at the same intensity. The storm weakened slightly and briefly moved offshore, before making another landfall near Ocean Springs, Mississippi, with winds of 40 mph (65 km/h).

Early on September 14, the storm weakened to a tropical depression. It weakened slowly while moving northeastward across the Deep South, before dissipating near Athens, Georgia, on September 15. Operationally, it was considered the third tropical cyclone of the season. A telegraph from the Weather Bureau headquarters in Washington, D.C. warned vessels to remain in port for portions of the Gulf Coast of the United States. Strong gales were experienced along the coast from eastern Louisiana to western Florida and severely disrupted telegraph services in the region. The winds and tidal inundation exacerbated crop damage caused by an earlier storm along the Mississippi River in southeastern Louisiana. Growing rice was damaged in Cameron Parish but left unaffected in other parts of the state. The remnants brought heavy rains from Virginia to New England. Rough seas along the coast of New Jersey washed the schooner Willie ashore.

=== Tropical Storm Five ===
- Tropical storm (SSHWS)
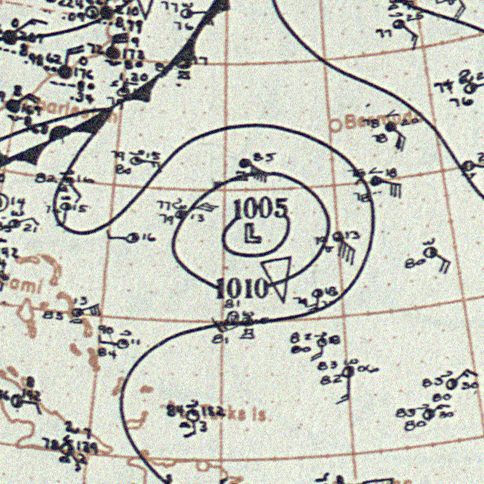
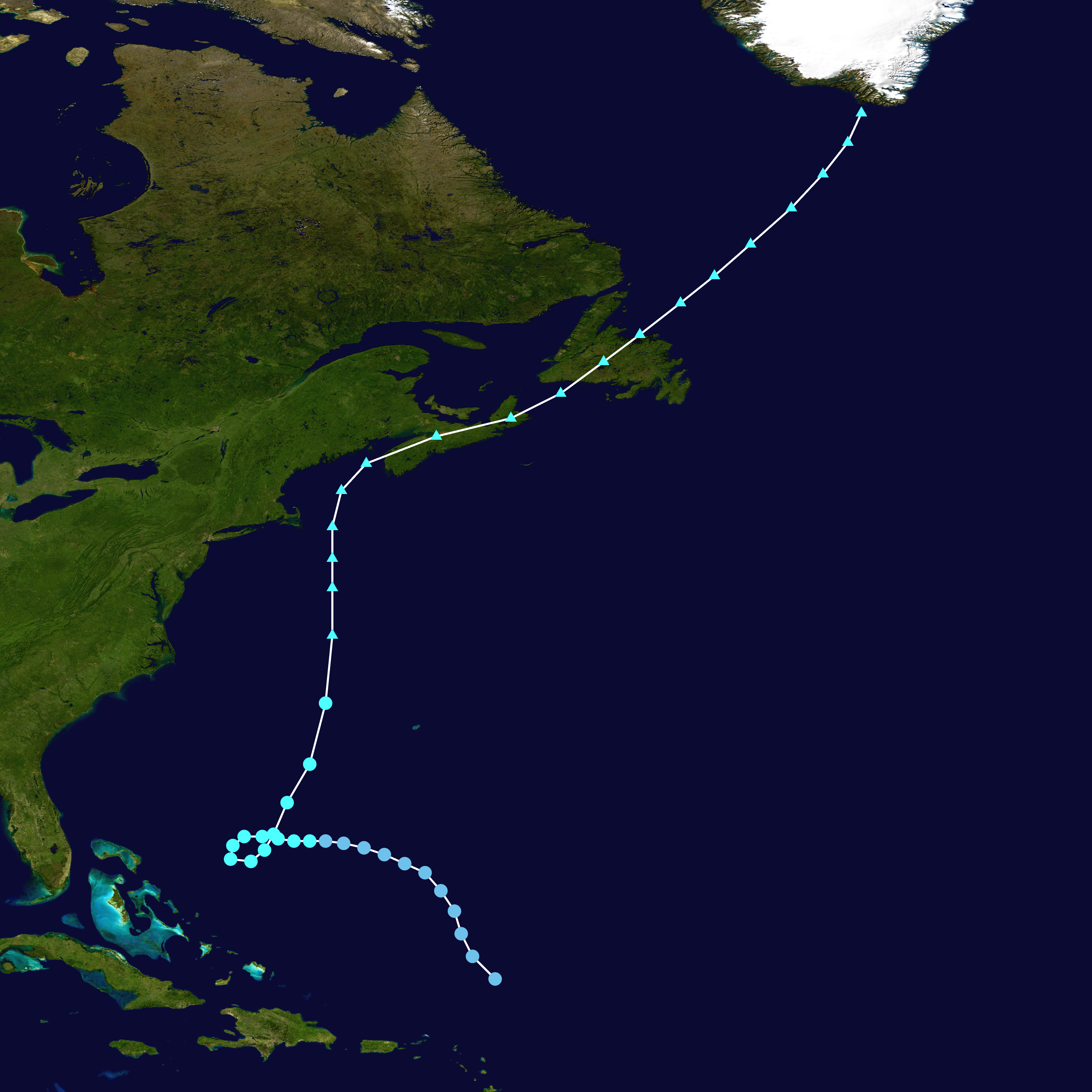
- Duration: October 4 – October 10
- Peak intensity: 70 mph (110 km/h) (1-min);

Observations from a ship indicate that the fifth tropical depression of the season developed at 0600 UTC on October 4, while located about 230 mi (370 km) northeast of Anguilla. Initially, the system remained weak and failed to strengthen into a tropical storm until October 7. It began to execute a cyclonic loop by early on the following day. Further intensification occurred and the storm peaked with winds of 70 mph (110 km/h) early on October 9. Eventually, it accelerated north-northeastward and became extratropical early on October 10. The remnants moved northward and eventually curved northeastward. Late on October 11, the extratropical remnants struck Nova Scotia. It continued rapidly across Atlantic Canada and re-emerged into the Atlantic. By October 14, the remnants dissipated near the southern tip of Greenland.

The remnants of Tropical Storm Five brought severe impact to Canada. In Nova Scotia, 13 schooners were grounded, while 2 were destroyed. Strong winds downed telegraph wires in the eastern end of the province, while barns were de-roofed and trees were felled in Bayfield. High tides in New Brunswick inundated portions of Saint John, with some houses having up to 18 in (460 mm) of water. Other low-lying areas were flooded. Washouts disrupted the Canadian Pacific Railway service and swept away portions of the tracks. The cost to repairs the tracks was estimated at $100,000. There was also damage to highways and bridges. A child drowned after attempting to cross a swollen creek. On Prince Edward Island, winds damaged small buildings and knocked chimneys of some houses. Electrical wires were reported down in Charlottetown.

=== Tropical Storm Six ===
- Tropical storm (SSHWS)
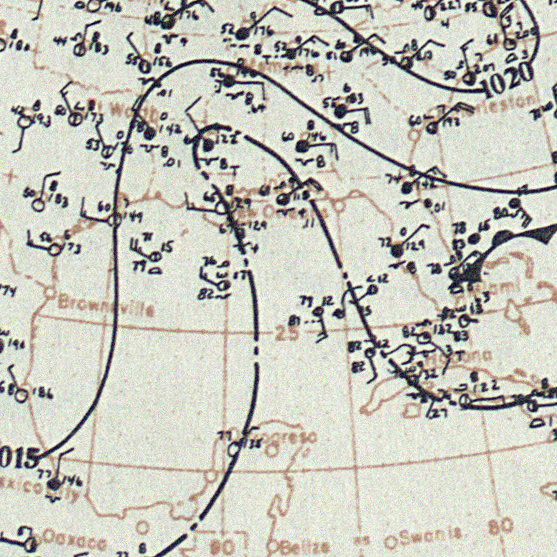
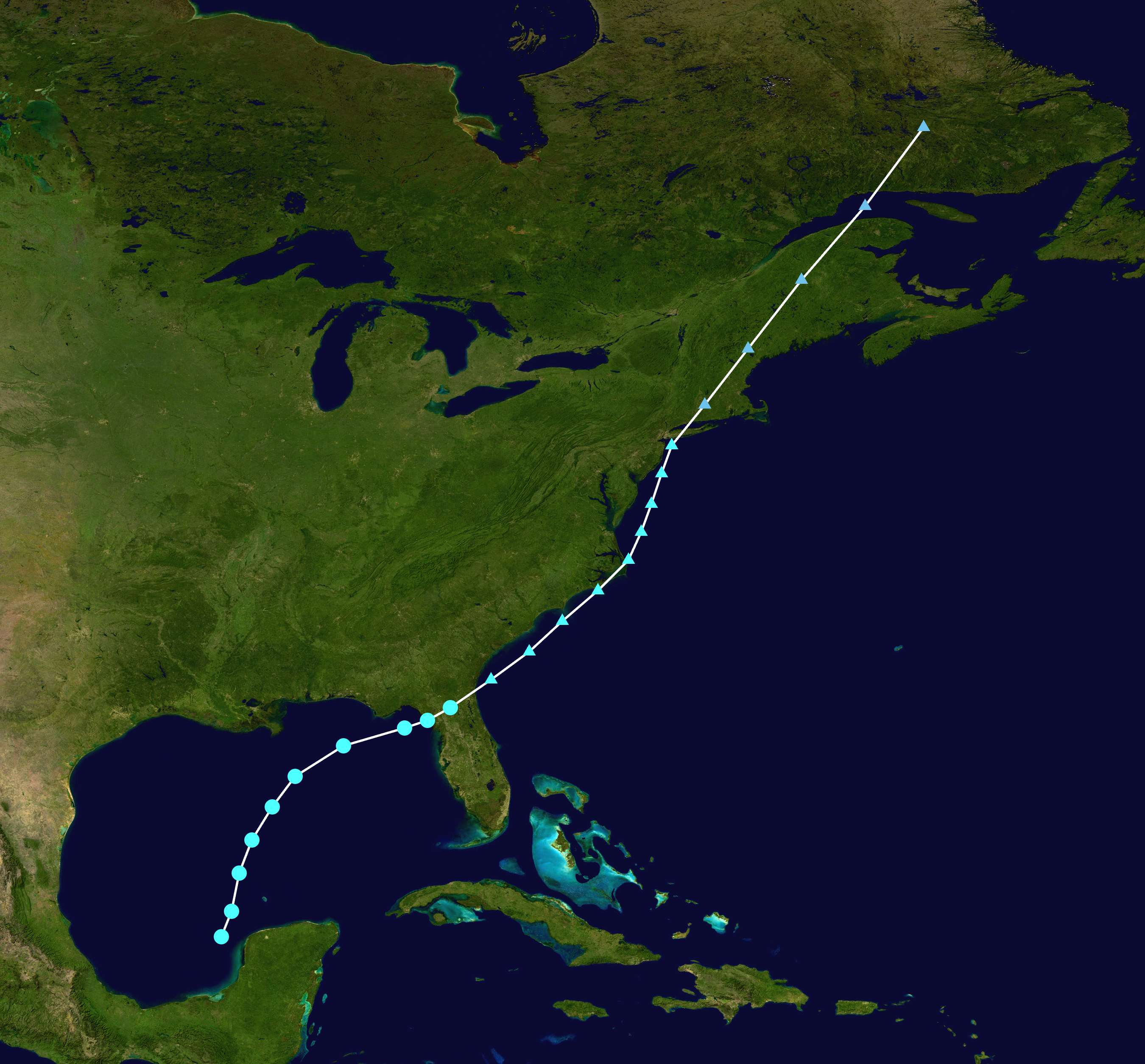
- Duration: October 10 – October 12
- Peak intensity: 45 mph (75 km/h) (1-min); ≤1008 mbar (hPa)

The sixth tropical storm of the season developed in the Bay of Campeche on October 10. Operationally, it was believed that the storm originated over eastern Cuba. Moving rapidly north-northeastward across the Gulf of Mexico, the storm peaked with maximum sustained winds of 45 mph (75 km/h) and a minimum barometric pressure of 1,008 mbar (29.8 inHg) early on October 11. The storm re-curved east-northeastward and made landfall near modern-day Horseshoe Beach, Florida, at the same intensity early the next day.

It emerged into the Atlantic Ocean late on October 12, shortly before becoming extratropical while located about 35 mi (55 km) east of Jekyll Island, Georgia. The remnants moved along the East Coast of the United States, striking the Outer Banks of North Carolina, Long Island in New York, and New England. It continued inland over Canada, until dissipating over Labrador on October 15. Impact from the storm was generally minor. Rainfall and gusty winds were reported between Florida and the Carolinas. Further north, it brought brisk to strong winds to New Jersey and southern New England.

=== Tropical Storm Seven ===
- Tropical storm (SSHWS)
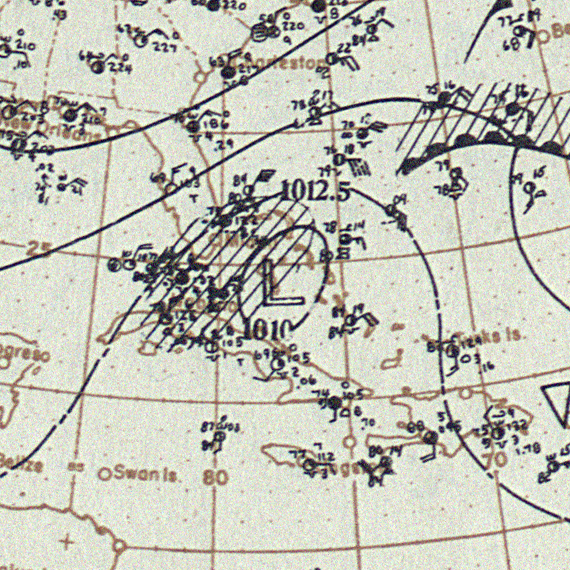
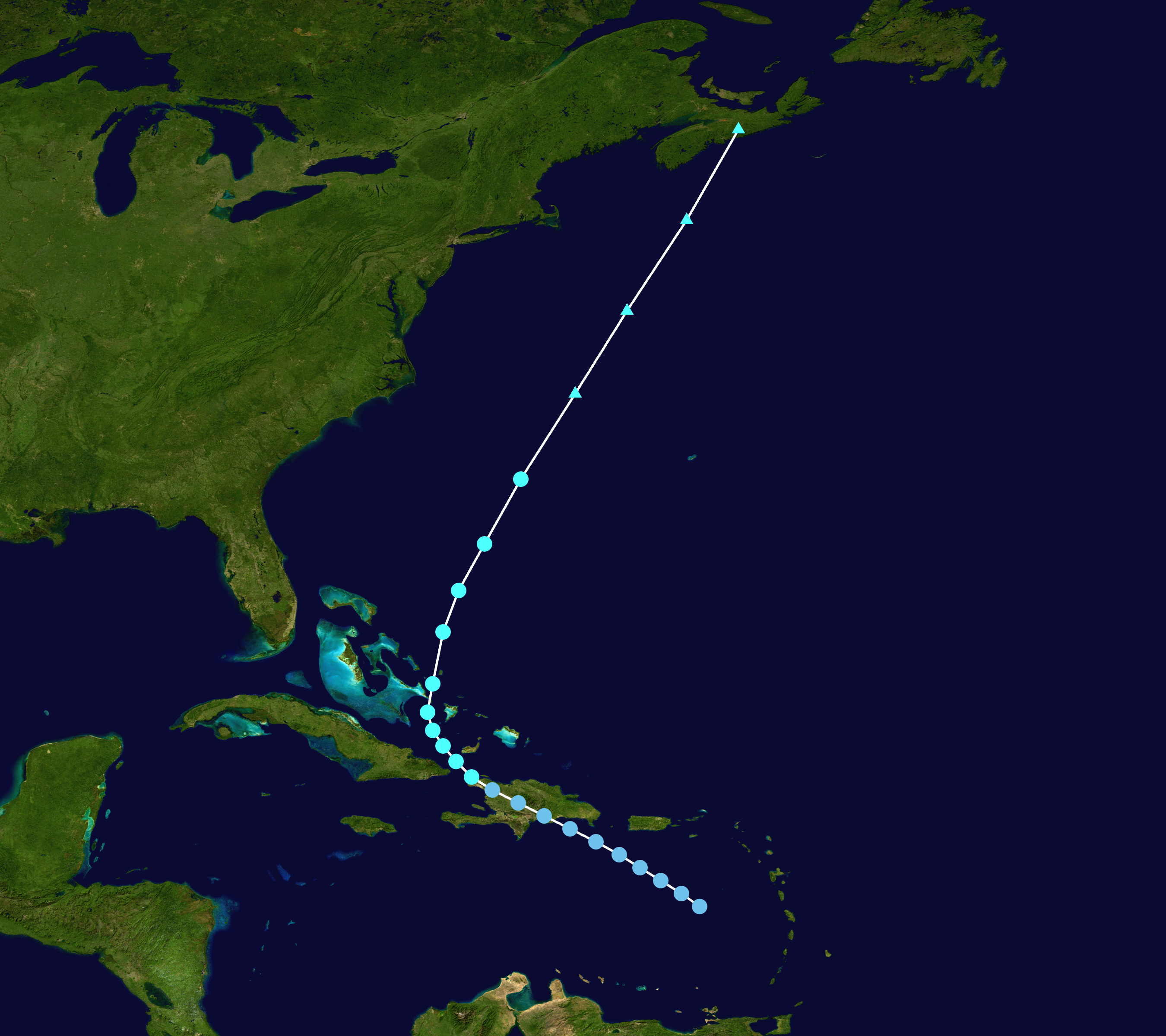
- Duration: October 24 – October 28
- Peak intensity: 50 mph (85 km/h) (1-min);

Telegraph reports indicate that a tropical depression developed in the eastern Caribbean Sea on October 24. The depression moved northwestward without differentiating in intensity before making landfall near San Cristóbal, Dominican Republic, with winds of 35 mph (55 km/h). It did not weaken while crossing Hispaniola and instead strengthened into a tropical storm shortly after emerging into the Atlantic Ocean near the northwestern tip of Haiti. Late on October 27, the storm re-curved north-northeastward and pass through the eastern Bahamas. Around that time, it peaked with maximum sustained winds of 50 mph (85 km/h).

Early on October 28, the storm accelerated and re-curved slightly to the northeast. At 0000 UTC on October 29, it transitioned into an extratropical cyclone while located about 310 mi (500 km) northwest of Bermuda. The extratropical remnants persisted until dissipating later on October 29. No impact was reported in either Dominican Republic or Haiti. Much of eastern Cuba reported light rains, particularly in the provinces of Camagüey and Santiago de Cuba. Strong winds were reported throughout the Bahamas, though no damage occurred. As far west as Jupiter, Florida, wind gusts reached 32 mph (51 km/h).

=== Other systems ===
A trough over the central Atlantic developed into a tropical depression on January 17. The depression moved northeastward and transitioned into an extratropical cyclone on January 19 while being absorbed by a frontal system. Historical weather maps indicate that the next tropical depression formed over the Atlantic just north of the Lesser Antilles on June 9. The depression may have intensified into a tropical storm on the following day, based on observations from a nearby ship. Continuing generally north-northwestward, the depression became extratropical after June 17. A third tropical depression also formed on June 9 over the northeastern Gulf of Mexico. The depression initially drifted northeastward and then doubled-back to the southwest. On June 11, the system turned northwestward and made landfall near Grand Isle, Louisiana, early the next day. The depression dissipated over Mississippi by June 14.

== Season effects ==
This is a table of all of the storms that have formed in the 1900 Atlantic hurricane season. It includes their duration, names, landfall, damages, and death totals. Deaths in parentheses are additional and indirect (an example of an indirect death would be a traffic accident), but were still related to that storm. Damage and deaths include totals while the storm was extratropical, a wave, or a low, and all of the damage figures are in 1900 USD.

Saffir–Simpson scale
TD	TS	C1	C2	C3	C4	C5

1900 North Atlantic tropical cyclone season statistics
Storm name	Dates active	Storm category at peak intensity	Max 1-min wind mph (km/h)	Min. press. (mbar)	Areas affected	Damage (US$)	Deaths	Ref(s).
Depression	January 17–19	Tropical depression	Unknown	Unknown	None	None	None	
Depression	June 9–17	Tropical depression	Unknown	1005	None	None	None	
Depression	June 9–14	Tropical depression	Unknown	1010	Louisiana, Mississippi	None	None	
One	August 27–September 11	Category 4 hurricane	145 (230)	936	Lesser Antilles, Greater Antilles (Dominican Republic, Cuba), Florida, Gulf Coast of the United States (Texas), Midwestern United States, Northeastern United States, Eastern Canada	35.4	8,000–12,000	
Two	September 7–19	Category 3 hurricane	120 (195)	Unknown	Bermuda	None	None	
Three	September 8–23	Category 2 hurricane	100 (155)	Unknown	Cape Verde	None	None	
Four	September 11–15	Tropical storm	50 (85)	1005	Gulf Coast of the United States (Louisiana), East Coast of the United States	Minor	None	
Five	October 4–10	Tropical storm	70 (110)	Unknown	Atlantic Canada	>$100,000	1	
Six	October 10–12	Tropical storm	45 (75)	Unknown	Florida, East Coast of the United States	Minor	None	
Seven	October 24–28	Tropical storm	50 (85)	Unknown	Hispaniola (Dominican Republic), Cuba, Bahamas, Florida, Atlantic Canada	Unknown	None	
Season aggregates
10 systems	January 17 – October 28		145 (230)	936		35.5	8,000–12,000	

== See also ==
- Atlantic hurricane reanalysis project
- Tropical cyclone observation
- 1900–1940 South Pacific cyclone seasons
- 1900–1950 South-West Indian Ocean cyclone seasons
- 1900s Australian region cyclone seasons
