= Chaabi =

Name for different North African music genres

Chaabi (شعبي in Arabic), also known as Chaâbi, Sha-bii, or Sha'bii, meaning "of the people", refers to different music genres in North Africa such as Algerian chaabi, Moroccan chaabi and Egyptian Shaabi.

Chaabi music is frequently played in weddings and festivals.

== Popular artists ==
- Hakim
- Hassan El Asmar
- Jedwan
- Saïd Senhaji
- El Hadj M'Hamed El Anka
- El Hachemi Guerouabi
- Amar Ezzahi
- Dahmane El Harrachi
- Kamel Messaoudi
- Hamada Helal
- Bab L' Bluz
