= Rome Rather Than You =

2006 Algerian film

- Directed by: Tariq Teguia
- Written by: Tariq Teguia
- Produced by: Helge Albers; Cati Couteau; Tariq Teguia; Yacine Teguia
- Starring: Samira Kaddour; Rachid Amrani
- Cinematography: Hacène Ait Kaci; Nasser Medjkane
- Edited by: Andrée Davanture; Rodolphe Molla
- Production companies: Neffa Films; Institut national de l'audiovisuel Flying Moon Filmproduktion
- Release date: September 5, 2006 (Venice Film Festival)
- Running time: 111 minutes
- Countries: Algeria; France; Germany
- Language: Arabic

Rome Rather Than You (Arabic: روما ولا نتوما, romanized: Rūmā wa-lā ntumā; French: Rome plutôt que vous) is a 2006 Algerian-French-German drama film directed by Tariq Teguia, starring Samira Kaddour and Rachid Amrani as two young people who seek to leave Algeria and the Algerian Civil War behind for a brighter future. This is Teguia's feature film directorial debut. (He had previously made a few shorts and a 2002 documentary.) The film won the Special Jury Award at the 2007 Fribourg International Film Festival.

== Plot ==
Twenty-year-old Kamel and his friend, twenty-three-year-old Zina, search Algiers for human trafficker Bosco to obtain forged passports so they can leave the country for Rome.

== Reception ==
Variety magazine critic Robert Koehler praised "Tariq Teguia’s highly accomplished debut ... Although the final moments are foreseeable, both the getting there and the immediate aftermath show Teguia to be a director of major promise". Koehler also approved of the "naturalistic, easygoing perfs [performances]" of Kaddoui and Amrani. In Slant Magazine, however, Eric Henderson considered the film to be "arrogantly conceived, pretentiously executed, and petulantly protracted".

== Cast ==
- Samira Kaddour as Zina
- Rachid Amrani as Kamel
- Ahmed Benaissa as The policeman
- Kader Affak as Malek
- Lali Maloufi as Merzak
- Moustapha Benchaïb as Mahmoud
- Khaddra Boudedhane as Zina's mother
- Rabbie Azzabi as Young man in sportswear
- Fethi Ghares as Young man in working overalls
