= Merouane Guerouabi =

Algerian actor and comedian

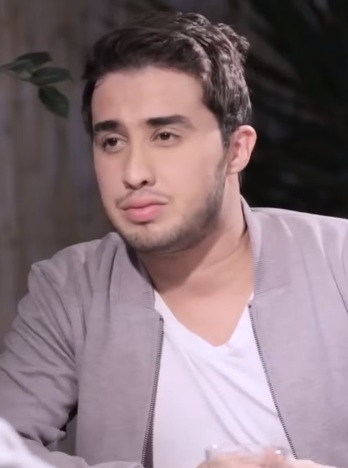
- Merouane Guerouabi, January 2016
- Born: Merouane Guerouabi; January 11, 1989 (age 37); Algiers, Algeria
- Occupations: Actor, comedian
- Years active: 2013–present
- Father: El Hachemi Guerouabi

Merouane Guerouabi (born 11 January 1989), often known as Bibich, is an Algerian actor and comedian.

== Personal life ==
He was born on 11 January 1989 in Algiers, Algeria. His father El Hachemi Guerouabi was an Algerian singer and composer of Chaâbi and one of the Grand Masters of the Algiers-based Chaâbi music. Before the acting, he was a soccer player.

== Career ==
After many unsuccessful castings, Guerouabi decided to write his first sketch which was broadcast on the Internet in 2013 with the pseudonym MGDZ.

In 2017, he appeared in the television talk show Huitième Jour (J8).

== Filmography ==
Year	Film	Role	Genre	Ref.
2019	Bibich & Bibicha 5 (Le come-back)	Bibich	TV series	
2021	Sultan Achour 10 (saison 3)	El Hachmi	TV series	
2023	Dar lefchouch (saison 1)	Lah'lou	TV series	
2024	Dar lefchouch (saison 2)	Lah'lou	TV series	
2026	Digourdi	Digourdi	TV series	
