= Haifa Rahim =

Algerian actress

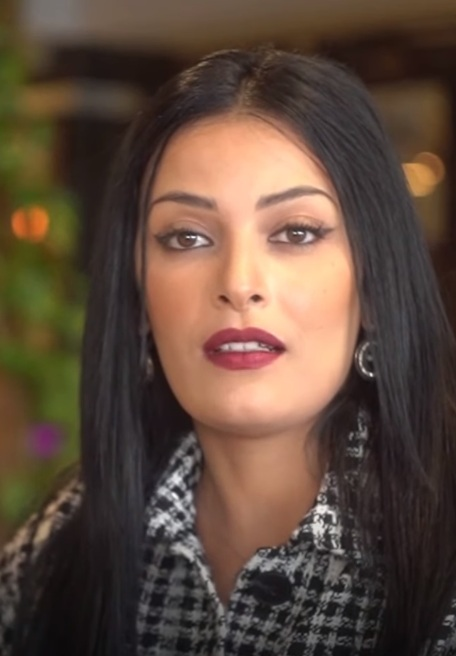
- Haifa Rahim, December 2020
- Born: Haifa Rahim; Algiers, Algeria
- Occupation: Actress
- Years active: 2014–present
- Notable work: Wlad Lahlal

Haifa Rahim is an Algerian actress. She is best known as the director of popular television series Wlad Lahlal and for her role in the film Gates of the Sun.

== Career ==
In 2014, Rahim was selected for the film Les portes du soleil: Algérie pour toujours (Gates of the Sun) directed by Jean-Marc Minéo. The film had its premier on 18 March 2015 in Algeria which received critical acclaim and later screened at several film festivals. She also acted in the film Algeria forever in 2014.

In 2019, she appeared in the television serial Wlad Lahlal directed by Nasir al-Din al-Suhaili.

== Filmography ==
| Year | Film | Role | Genre | Ref. |
|---|---|---|---|---|
| 2014 | Les portes du soleil: Algérie pour toujours | Linda | Film | |
| 2014 | Algeria forever | | Film | |
| 2019 | Wlad Lahlal | Dalila | TV series | |
| 2025 | El Furak | Meriem | TV series | |
