= Meriem Oukbir =

Algerian actress (born 1991)

- Born: Meriem Oukbir; February 26, 1991 (age 35); Algiers, Algeria
- Occupations: Actress, model
- Years active: 2018–present
- Notable work: Wlad Lahlal
- Height: 1.74 m (5 ft 9 in)

Meriem Oukbir (born 26 February 1991), is an Algerian actress. She is best known for the role 'Dalya' in the films Wlad Lahlal.

== Career ==
She graduated from the university in 2013. While in the university, she began her career as a model. In 2016, she made her maiden acting role, as Zahra, in the comedy series Under supervision. Maryam achieved success as an actress due to the popular role of 'Zahra' in the series On Watch, in which she got good reactions from the public.

== Filmography ==
Year	Film	Role	Genre	Ref.
2019	Wlad Lahlal	Dalya	TV series	
