= Gabbla =

2009 Algerian film

- Directed by: Tariq Teguia
- Screenplay by: Tariq Teguia, Yacine Teguia
- Produced by: Neffa Films, Ciné@, Captures, Le Fresnoy
- Starring: Abdelkader Affak, Ines Rose, Ahmed Benaïssa, Fethi Ghares, Djalila Kadj-Hanifi
- Cinematography: Nasser Medjkane, Hacène Aït Kaci
- Edited by: Rodolphe Molla, Andrée Davanture
- Music by: Ines Rose
- Release date: 2008
- Running time: 138 minutes
- Countries: Algeria; France

Gabbla (Arabic: قابلة, romanized: Qābilah, lit. 'Island') is a 2009 film directed by Tariq Teguia.

== Synopsis ==
Despite practically living as a recluse far from the maddening world, Malek, a forty-year-old topographer, accepts a job to the West of Algeria. A company in Oran entrusts him with the layout of the new electrical line that will bring power to the hamlets in the Ouarsenis Massif, an area that lived under the whip of radical Islamism until barely ten years ago. After several hours on the road, Malek reaches the base camp. While he starts putting things in order, he discovers a young woman hidden in a corner.

== Awards ==
- Venice Film Festival 2008 FIPPRESCI Prize
