= Ahmed Benaissa =

Franco-Algerian actor (1944–2022)

- أحمد بن عيسى
- Born: 2 March 1944; French Algeria, France
- Died: 20 May 2022 (aged 78); Orléans, France
- Education: National Theater School
- Occupation: Actor
- Years active: 1971–2022

Ahmed Benaissa (2 March 1944 – 20 May 2022) was an Algerian actor, best known for the roles in the critically acclaimed films Étoile aux dents ou Poulou le magnifique, Gates of the Sun, and Close Enemies.

== Personal life ==
He was born in Algeria in a family of five girls and four boys. His father was an activist who was arrested and imprisoned in Algeria. However he was then released after Algerian Independence. He later moved to Paris, France where he lived for almost 18 years. During this period, he received training at the National Theater School.

He was married and was a father of two boys.

== Career ==
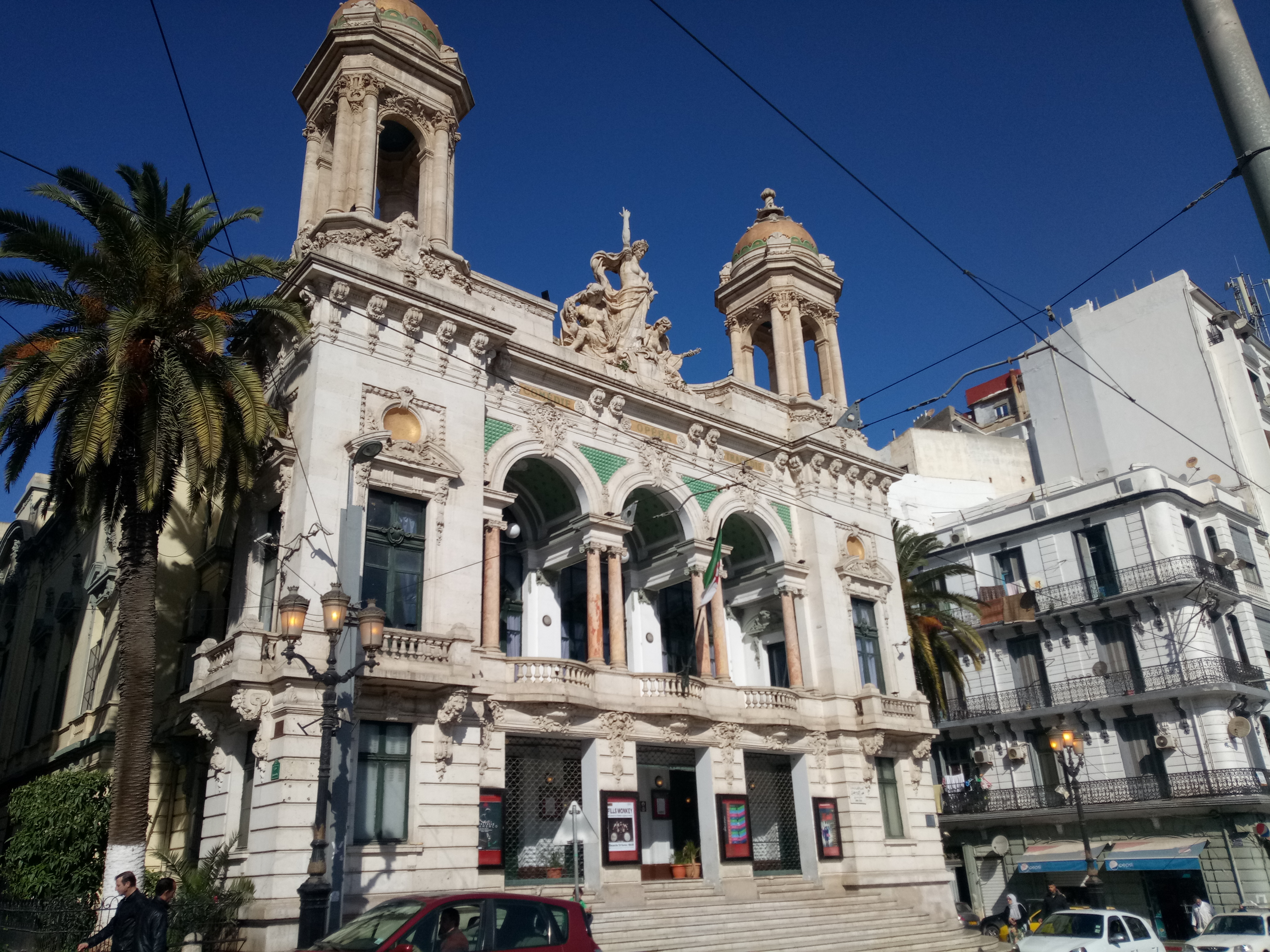
The regional theater Of Oran, where Ahmed was the director

In 1971, Benaïssa started his cinema career with the film Étoile aux dents ou Poulou le magnifique directed by Derri Berkani. He played the role 'Jibé' in that film. With the success of the film, he received several films in the following years such as Algerian films Leïla et les autres in 1977 directed by Sid Ali Mazif, Buamama in 1985 directed by Benamar Bakhti and popular comedy Le Clandestin in 1989 directed by Bakhti.

He played the main role of 'Haroun', in the film L’Etranger de Camus. He has performed and directed at the National Theater of Algiers, as well as at the Regional Theater of Oran. He also directed the Regional Theater of Sidi-Bel-Abbès. In 2013, he won the prize for Best Direction for the film Nedjma. Benaïssa played the role 'Rida' in Ramzi Ben Sliman's first feature film, My Revolution. It was released in France in August 2015. At the Theater, the tour with Meursaults continued in France in 2017.

His final film, Sons of Ramses, premiered at the 2022 Cannes Film Festival and was dedicated to him.

== Filmography ==
| Year | Film | Role | Genre | Ref. |
|---|---|---|---|---|
| 1971 | Étoile aux dents ou Poulou le magnifique | Jibé | Film | |
| 1977 | Leïla et les autres | | Film | |
| 1980 | Kahla Oua Beida | | TV movie | |
| 1990 | De Hollywood à Tamanrasset | Rai TV | Film | |
| 1994 | Bab El Oued City | The Imam | Film | |
| 1994 | Le Démon au féminin | | Film | |
| 2006 | Mon colonel | Ben Miloud | Film | |
| 2006 | Barakat! | Homme accueil hôpital | Film | |
| 2006 | Rome Rather Than You | The policeman | Film | |
| 2006 | The Colonel | Ben Miloud | Film | |
| 2006 | Es reicht! | Receptionist in the hospital | Film | |
| 2007 | Morituri | Commissaire Dine | Film | |
| 2007 | Délice Paloma | Monsieur Bellil | Film | |
| 2007 | Nuits d'Arabie | The shepherd | Film | |
| 2008 | Gabbla | Lakhdar | Film | |
| 2008 | Mostefa Ben Boulaid | Si Lakhdar | Film | |
| 2009 | Harragas | Père de Nasser | Film | |
| 2010 | Hors la loi | Le père | Film | |
| 2010 | Outside The Law | Der Vater | Film | |
| 2010 | The Last Passenger | | Short film | |
| 2010 | Edikra El Akhira | | TV series | |
| 2011 | Normal! | Ahmed | Film | |
| 2013 | Warda Al Jazayria: Eyyam | Ahmed Benaissa | Video short | |
| 2013 | Sotto voce | | Film | |
| 2014 | J'ai dégagé Ben Ali | | Film | |
| 2014 | The Man from Oran | Hassan | Film | |
| 2014 | Gates of the Sun | Mohamed | Film | |
| 2014 | Krim Belkacem | | Film | |
| 2014 | Ahlam Mou'ajala | Salah | TV series | |
| 2015 | Mista | | Film | |
| 2015 | Lotfi | Si Abdellah | Film | |
| 2016 | Ma révolution | Rida | Film | |
| 2017 | Ismael's Ghosts | Farias | Film | |
| 2018 | Close Enemies | Raji | Film | |
| 2019 | Papicha | Hafid | Film | |
| 2019 | Le sang des loups | Le commissaire | Film | |
| 2019 | Wlad Lahlal | father of Marzaq, Zino and Yahya | TV series | |
| 2022 | Sons of Ramses | Younes | Film; Final role | |
