= Sons of Ramses =

2022 drama film

- Theatrical release poster
- French: Goutte d'Or
- Directed by: Clément Cogitore
- Written by: Clément Cogitore
- Produced by: Jean-Christophe Reymond
- Starring: Karim Leklou
- Cinematography: Sylvain Verdet
- Edited by: Isabelle Manquillet
- Music by: Eric Bentz
- Production companies: Kazak Productions; France 2 Cinéma
- Distributed by: Diaphana
- Release dates: 20 May 2022 (Cannes); 1 March 2023 (France)
- Running time: 98 minutes
- Country: France
- Languages: French; Arabic
- Box office: $398,022

Sons of Ramses (French: Goutte d'Or) is a 2022 French drama film directed and written by Clément Cogitore. It stars Karim Leklou as the titular role.

The film had its world premiere at the 2022 Cannes Film Festival during the Critics' Week on 20 May 2022.

== Premise ==
Ramses, a clairvoyant lives in the Goutte d'Or district in Paris, finds his business and the tranquility of the entire neighborhood disrupted when a group of children begins terrorizing the locals. However, a significant shift occurs when Ramses experiences a vision one day.

== Cast ==
- Karim Leklou as Ramsès
- Jawad Outouia as Hachara
- Elyes Dkhissi as Farel
- Ahmed Benaissa as Younes
- Malik Zidi as Mickael
- Elsa Wolliaston as Céleste
- Losseni Sanoko
- Lacina Sanoko
- Yilin Yang as Grace
- Loubna Abidar as the mother of Frikket and Farel
- Jibril Bouhadi
- Chakib Mokhtari
- Ayoub Lafdal
- Adam Benhalla
- Nada El Belkasmi as the customer

== Production ==
In 2021, it was announced that the project received a production grant from Centre national du cinéma et de l'image animée. The screenplay also won the 34th Prix du scénario in the same year.

The principal photography took place from June to July 2021 in Bordeaux and Paris.

== Release ==
Sons of Ramses had its world premiere at the Critics' Week section of the 2022 Cannes Film Festival on 20 May. Hours before the premiere, Ahmed Benaissa, who portrayed Younes, died at the age of 78.

The film was distributed in French theatres on 1 March 2023 by Diaphana. It achieved 65,571 admissions during its theatrical run.

== Reception ==
=== Critical response ===
Sons of Ramses received an average rating of 3.8 out of 5 stars on the French website AlloCiné, based on 25 reviews.

=== Accolades ===
Award	Date of ceremony	Category	Recipient(s)	Result	Ref.
Lumière Awards	22 January 2024	Best Film	Clément Cogitore	Nominated	
Lumière Awards	22 January 2024	Best Director	Clément Cogitore	Nominated	
Lumière Awards	22 January 2024	Best Cinematography	Sylvain Verdet	Nominated	
