= 8J =

8J or 8-J can refer to:

- 8J, IATA code for UTair Express
- 8J, code for Greater Albany Public School District
- 8J powertrain, a feature of the Audi TT
- F-8J, a model of Vought F-8 Crusader
- Y-8J, a model of Shaanxi Y-8
- 8J, shed code for Allerton TMD
- 8JE740, code for J&J Hunt Submerged Archaeological Site

== See also ==
- J8 (disambiguation)
