= Asmar (disambiguation) =

ASMAR is the acronym of the Chilean company Astilleros y Maestranzas de la Armada (Spanish: Navy Shipyards and Armories). It may also refer to:

- Asmar (name), list of people with the name
- Asmar, Afghanistan, city
- Azur & Asmar: The Princes' Quest, 2006 French film
