= Fethi Ghares =

Algerian politician (born 1973)

- فتحي غراس
- Born: 20 July 1973 (age 53); Algiers, Algeria
- Occupation: Politician
- Years active: 1998–present
- Known for: Opposition to Abdelmadjid Tebboune
- Political party: Democratic and Social Movement
- Criminal charges: Disseminating false information
- Criminal penalty: Two years imprisonment
- Criminal status: Suspended pending appeal
- Spouse: Messaouda Cheballah

Fethi Ghares (Arabic: فتحي غراس, romanized: Fatḥī Ghirās; born 20 July 1973) is an Algerian politician. A member of the Democratic and Social Movement, which was banned by Algerian authorities in 2023, he has been arrested and imprisoned several times for his activism, particularly his criticisms of the president of Algeria, Abdelmadjid Tebboune.

== Biography ==
Ghares was born in Algiers. He joined the Democratic and Social Movement upon its formation in 1998, while studying at the agricultural institute in Mostaganem. He was a member of the party's national bureau until 2013, when he became its official spokesperson. Ghares has described the French West Indian political philosopher Frantz Fanon as among his biggest influences. In May 2018, he publicly asserted that he supported freedom of conscience, and called for the separation of politics and religion to be enshrined in the Algerian constitution.

Ghares is married to Messaouda Cheballah, a member of the executive secretariat of the Democratic and Social Movement.

Ghares announced himself as the Democratic and Social Movement candidate for the 2019 Algerian presidential election, though did not submit an official dossier of his candidacy. Following the outbreak of the Hirak protests, he renounced his candidacy and instead called for an end to the current Algerian political system, to be replaced with a presidium composed of four or five independent candidates and the installation of a non-partisan transitional government.

In addition to politics, Ghares has also acted in films, including a leading role in Révolution Zendj by Tariq Teguia.

=== 2021 arrest and imprisonment ===
On 30 June 2021, Ghares was arrested at his home in Djasr Kasentina by plainclothes police officers. The National Committee for the Liberation of Detainees subsequently issued a press release which alleged that, after initially being taken to a police station, Ghares had been returned to his home in order for a search to take place, before being transported to an unknown location.

On 1 July 2021, Ghares was ordered into pretrial detention by a judge at a court in Hammamet. His trial was originally scheduled to begin on 6 December, before being delayed to 12 December. On 9 January 2022, Ghares was sentenced to two years imprisonment on charges of "insulting the President of the Republic", "contempt of a constitutional body", "disseminating publications that could harm the national unity", and "disseminating information that could harm public order". The sentence was criticised by the opposition movement in Algeria.

In March 2022, Ghares' sentence was reduced to six months imprisonment following a successful appeal, which led to his immediate release from prison. He subsequently publicly commented on conditions at El Harrach Prison, describing it as "medieval" and stating that no one left it "unscathed".

In February 2023, the Democratic and Social Movement was banned.

=== 2024 arrest and imprisonment ===
On 27 August 2024, Ghares was arrested by plainclothes police officers and transported to an unknown location, according to his wife and the National Committee for the Liberation of Detainees. The arrest happened 15 days before the 2024 Algerian presidential election, in which Abdelmadjid Tebboune was seeking a second term. Ghares was accused of "disrupting the election".

On 29 August 2024, Ghares was charged with "insulting the president" and "spreading false information and hate speech through social media posts". He was released from custody and placed under judicial supervision. In January 2025, Ghares was sentenced to one year in prison and ordered to pay symbolic damages of one DZD to President Tebboune. Ghares' wife received a six-month suspended sentence.

=== 2025 arrest and imprisonment ===
On 29 September 2025, Ghares was arrested for a third time at his home for "insulting the President of the Republic". In October 2025, he was found guilty of "insulting a constituted body" and "disseminating false information undermining public order and national security", and was sentenced to two years imprisonment and a fine of 300, 000 DZD. Ghares remained on provisional release pending the outcome of his appeal of the sentence.

In July 2026, Ghares was sentenced to two years' imprisonment and fined 300, 000 DZD at an appeal hearing.
