= Mustapha Laribi =

Algerian film actor

- Born: Chérif Laribi; January 8, 1969 (age 57); Koléa, Algeria
- Occupation: Actor
- Notable work: Krim Belkacem
- Television: Hob Fi Kafas El Itiham

Mustapha Laribi born January 8, 1969) is an Algerian film actor.

== Acting career ==
Laribi graduated from the Higher Institute of Arts Theater with his artistic credentials. This included many successful dramas such as the series 'hearts in conflict', 'blue band' 'social series' secrets in addition to 'difficult exam', which won the Golden Art Award for best A secondary role for men, in a new film entitled "Seven Walls of the Citadel" Algerian director "Ahmed Rachedi", where our speaker embodies the role of "Kaid Gaballah," an educated figure located between the fire of his son who joined the ranks of the National Liberation Front and the fire of his belief in the need to avoid Face the French enemy

== Filmography ==
Film
| Year | Title | Role | Notes |
|---|---|---|---|
| 2014 | Krim Belkacem | Abane Ramdane | |
| 2015 | Lotfi | Si Slimane | |
| 2018 | Fouilleurs Nés | Omar | |
| 2020 | Héliopolis | Ferhat Abbas | |

Television
| Year | Title | Role | Notes |
|---|---|---|---|
| 2005 | Printemps noir | Mourad | |
| 2006 | Imtihane Essaab | Lamjad | Main role 19 episodes |
| 2008 | Kouloub Fi Siraa | Youssef | |
| 2014 | Khamsa | Professor Ali | |
| 2015 | Hob Fi Kafas El Itiham | | |
| 2016 | Qoloub Tahta Ramad | | |
| 2018 | Dakious & Makious | The driving school monitor | 1 episode |
| 2019 | Wlad Lahlal | Khalid | Main role 28 episodes |
| 2022 | Indama Tadjrahona Al Ayam | Khaled | Main role 30 episodes |
| 2023 | El Damma الداما | Allem | Main role 25 episodes |
| 2024 | Al Barani البراني | Omar | Main role 20 episodes |
| 2025 | Al Arth الأرض | Abbas | Main role 26 episodes |

== Awards ==
- 2007: Fennec d'or Best male role Actor – Won
