= Chebab TV =

- Country: Algeria
- Broadcast area: Europe; Middle East; North Africa; West Asia
- Headquarters: Oran

Programming
- Language: Arabic
- Picture format: 1080p (16:9) (HDTV)

Ownership
- Owner: Ali Guettaf

History
- Launched: 1 November 2025; 12 months ago

Links
- Website: chebabtv.dz

Chebab TV (Arabic: قناة الشباب) is an Algerian television channel based in Oran, Algeria and that airs in countries in Africa, Asia, and Europe. It offers a varied range of media content aimed primarily at young people, covering sports, culture, current events, and entertainment.

== History ==
The story of Chebab TV officially begins on 1 November 2025, with the launch of its satellite broadcasts from Oran. Founded and led by Ali Guettaf, the channel chose to debut its first programs to coincide with the commemoration of the 71st anniversary of the outbreak of the Algerian Revolution in 1954. Driven by its general manager, Ali Guettaf, the project was conceived to provide a space for expression and creativity for young graduates from Algerian universities, as well as for young journalists and technicians.

Unlike most national media outlets, which are concentrated in Algiers, Chebab TV has established its headquarters and studios in Oran (on Ouah Ouah Madani Road), thereby contributing to the media vibrancy of the country's western region.
