= Yoland Asmar =

Syrian actress and singer

Yolande Asmar
- Born: January 1, 1930; Aleppo, Syria
- Died: January 1, 1988 (aged 58); Damascus, Syria
- Other names: Basma
- Occupations: Actress, singer
- Years active: 1970–1986

Yolande Asmar (Arabic: يولاند أسمر) was a Syrian actress and singer who commenced her career in the early 1970s. Renowned for her angelic and celestial vocal talents, she garnered recognition for her significant contributions to the musical landscape, particularly in the churches of Aleppo.

== Early life ==
Asmar was born in 1930 in Aleppo to Hoda Antaki and Naeem Asmar, and was raised in a conservative and educated family. Her father, a high school teacher at the Holy Land School in Aleppo, studied directing in Jerusalem and established the Catholic Theater Club in Aleppo in 1945.

Her nickname, Basma, came from her smile.

== Career ==
Asmar began acting within the theater group of the Catholic Club in Aleppo, participating in international plays like The Noble Bourgeois, The Scholarly Women of Molière, and The Miser. She served as the primary cantor in the church choir, and would sing in the churches of Aleppo throughout her lifetime. Her vocal performances also captivated audiences in Damascus, where churches and public squares were filled with admirers of her musical talent until the end of her life.

Yolande Asmar was invited to perform on Syrian Radio in Aleppo after Antoine Zabita, the music department director at Aleppo Radio, heard her performing. She initially sang songs in Classical Arabic, with texts set to music by Chopin and Mozart, with arrangements by poet Charles Khoury and musical composition by Aziz Ghanem. In the 1960s, she also performed a number of children's songs on children's programs. Yolande Asmar was the only singer on both Damascus and Aleppo radio stations who was proficient in singing in both French and Italian.

In Syrian television, Yolande Asmar appeared across various series during the late sixties and early seventies. Her versatility extended to roles in Syrian cinema. Asmar collaborated with the Syrian Cinema Foundation. Notable among her filmography is her debut in The Deceived (1972), a film directed and scripted by Tawfiq Saleh, adapted from the narrative by Palestinian writer Ghassan Kanafani.

In 1975, Asmar visited the Vatican, where she had the honor of meeting Pope Paul VI. During her visit, the Arabic section of Vatican Radio welcomed her and conducted an interview, highlighting her distinctive style of religious singing in the Arabic language accompanied by oriental musical instruments. The on-air session featured several religious hymns, including "To You, O Jesus," composed by Ibrahim Jawdat with lyrics by Issa Ayoub. Notable among the religious hymns were "O Mary, Most Pure," "You are all beautiful, O Mary," and "O Mother of God." During this visit, she received an invitation to join the choir of the Sixteenth International Cathedral, although her father opposed her traveling abroad.

A significant portion of the songs performed by Asmar on Damascus Radio, notably on the program "Around the World" curated by Mr. Lutfi, have been lost over time.

== Personal life ==
She had one daughter.

== Death ==
Asmar died in Damascus in 1988 after a prolonged illness.

== Filmography ==
Year	Film	Role	Notes	Ref
1970	The Palace Alley			
1972	The Dupes			
1974	Antar, Desert Knight			
1974	Zabaa's Revenge			
1975	As'aad Al-Warraq			
1976	Days in London			
1977	Fawzia			
1978	A Marriage on the Local Way			
1978	The Third Story from the Biography of Bani Hilal: The Adventure of Princess Al-Shama			
1979	Hunters' Lane			
1979	My Love My Mulberry Love			
1980	Salt Allies			
1980	Khalil's Father			
1981	The Gurad			
1982	The Good One			
1983	Day to Day S2			
1983	Al-Hodoud (film)			
1984	Leila and the Wolves			
1985	Proceedings of Next Year			
1986	Short Paths			
