= Jedwan =

Moroccan singer and Islamic preacher

Mokhtar Jedwan
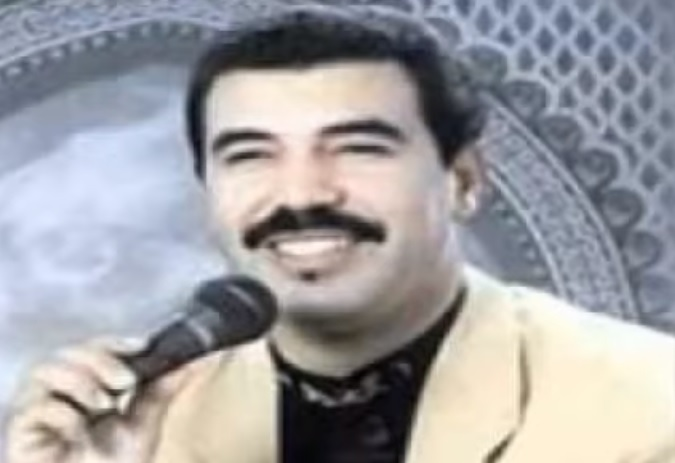

Background information
- Birth name: المختار جدوان
- Born: 1967; Rabat, Morocco
- Occupation: Singer
- Years active: 1983–2008

Mokhtar Jedwan, also written Jedwane, or Jedouan (in Arabic: المختار جدوان, Rabat, 1967) is a Moroccan singer, who stopped his singing career in 2008 and became an Islamic preacher and a Quran reader.

== Early life ==
Mokhtar Jedwan grew up in an artistic family, where each of his three brothers had his own musical group. He was especially influenced by listening to the mythical groups of Nass El Ghiwane and Jil Jilala.

In late 1983, Jedwane formed his own orchestra and began performing in special events and celebrations till he was discovered by a producer who offered him a contract. Since then, he has released several albums and became a widely known musician in Morocco, mostly performing at weddings and parties.

In 2008, at the age of forty, Jedwan decided to stop his musical career, and devote his time to Islamic preaching.
