= Al Magharibia =

Algerian free-to-air television channel

Almagharibia / قناة المغاربية
- Country: United Kingdom
- Broadcast area: Europe, Africa, Middle East
- Network: Almagharibia tv
- Headquarters: London, United Kingdom

Programming
- Language: Arabic
- Picture format: 576i (4:3 SDTV)

Ownership
- Sister channels: Almagharibia.tv

History
- Launched: 16 December 2011

Links
- Website: almagharibia.tv

Almagharibia tv (Arabic: المغاربية) is an Algerian free-to-air television channel broadcasting from London. It was founded by a successful Algerian businessman with a number of Arab intellectuals from Britain and the Arab World. Almagharibia has announced the launch of a new channel in Tamazight language, "Almagharibia two".

== History ==
Almagharibia was founded in November 2011, and started to broadcast its programs on 16 December 2011.

== Programs ==
- Our religion (Arabic: ديننا)
- World Today (Arabic: العالم اليوم)
- Street Echo (Arabic: صدى الشارع)
- Maghrebian Event (Arabic: الحدث المغاربي)
- Newspapers said (Arabic: قالت الصحف)
