= Bayfield, Nova Scotia =

Community in Nova Scotia, Canada

Coordinates: 45°37′51.91″N 61°44′44.66″W

Bayfield in Nova Scotia

Bayfield (Scottish Gaelic:An Abhainn Bheag) is a community in the Canadian province of Nova Scotia, located in Antigonish County. The community is named after Henry Wolsey Bayfield.

== Parks ==
- Bayfield Beach Provincial Park
