= Echorouk News =

Echorouk News / الشروق نيوز
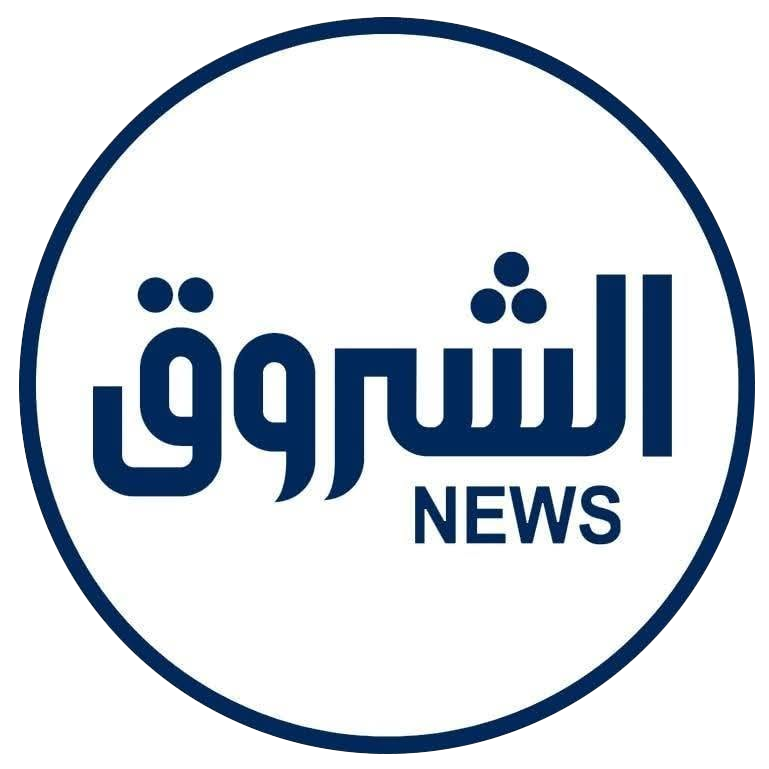
- Country: Algeria
- Broadcast area: Europe, Africa, Middle-East
- Network: Echourouk News
- Headquarters: Algiers, Algeria

Programming
- Language: Arabic
- Picture format: 4:3 (576i, SDTV); 16:9 (1080i, HDTV)

Ownership
- Owner: Echourouk Group
- Sister channels: Echourouk TV; Echorouk Plus

History
- Launched: 19 March 2014

Links
- Website: echoroukonline.com (ِArabic)

Echorouk News (Arabic: الشروق نيوز) is an Arabic language satellite television channel broadcasting from Algiers. Echourouk News was set up by Echourouk Group with a number of Arab intellectuals from Algeria and the Arab world.

== History ==
Echorouk News was founded on 19 March 2014, it has started to broadcast its programs on 19 March 2014.

== Programming ==
=== News ===
- News (الأخبار), main news bulletin.
- Sport (رياضة), sports news bulletin.
- Weather (الطقس; 2013), weather forecasts.

=== Current affairs ===
- Echorouk Morning (الشروق مورنينغ; 2016), morning show;
- Before Sohoor (قبل السّحور; 2015), talk show broadcast only during ramadan;
- Report (ربورتاج), show featuring reports;
- Reporters (مراسلون), a show featuring special reports by Echorouk News reporters.

=== Documentaries ===
- Rabah Gherbi…A player and coach with excellence (رابح غربي.. لاعب و مدرّب بامتياز; 2017–17)

=== Events ===
Notable events to which Echorouk News hold broadcasting rights include:

==== Football ====
- Belgian First Division A (2016–2017)

== On-air staff ==
=== Weather ===
- Siham Benmeziane (2017–)
- Kamelia Dina Boualili (2017–)
- Cheikh Ferhat (2013–2016)
- Radah Kalloul (2014–2014)
- Radia Sediki (2013–2016)
- Meriem Tahri (2014–2016)
- Hana Touati (2017–)

=== Correspondents ===
- Samia Mouaki

== Temporary Suspension of Echorouk News Broadcast ==
On 2 May 2025, Algeria's National Independent Authority for Audiovisual Regulation suspended Echorouk News' broadcast for ten days. The decision followed the channel's airing of content described as "dangerously racist" towards African migrants. The authority stated that the channel used terminology constituting hate speech and discrimination against a group of undocumented migrants from African countries, representing a serious breach of audiovisual broadcasting regulations.
