= Hogar TV =

Hogar TV / الهقار تي في
- Country: Algeria
- Broadcast area: Europe, Africa, Middle-East
- Network: Hogar TV
- Headquarters: Fort de l'eau, Algiers, Algeria

Programming
- Language: Arabic
- Picture format: 4:3 (576i, SDTV)

Ownership
- Owner: Mohammed Mouloudi
- Sister channels: Al Hogar News

History
- Launched: 23 April 2012
- Closed: 3 August 2015

Links
- Website: [ ] (french)

Hogar TV (Arabic: الهقار تي في) is an Arabic language satellite television channel broadcasting from Hydra. Hogar TV was set up by an Algerian businessman Mohammed Mouloudi with a number of Arab intellectuals from Algeria and the Arab World.

== History ==
Hogar TV was founded in May 2012, it has started to broadcast its programs in May 2012.

== Programming ==
- Eon Kid
