= El Hachemi Guerouabi =

Background information
- Born: January 6, 1938; Algiers, Algeria
- Died: July 17, 2006 (aged 68) Zeralda, Algeria
- Genres: Chaâbi
- Occupations: Singer, composer

El Hachmi Guerouabi (Arabic: الهاشمي القروابي; January 6, 1938 – July 17, 2006) was an Algerian singer and composer of Chaâbi.

He was born in El Mouradia and grew up in Belouizdad. Guerouabi died on July 17, 2006, in Zeralda near Algiers. He is The father of Merouane Guerouabi

== Discography ==
- Le Chaabi des Maîtres (1994)
- Succès d'hier (1995)
- Salem Maghreb (2000)
- Le grand Maître du chaabi rend hommage au pays (2002)
