= Hassan El Asmar =

Egyptian singer and actor (1959–2011)

Hassan al-Asmar حسن الأسمر
- Born: 21 October 1959
- Died: 7 August 2011 (aged 51)
- Occupations: Actor; singer

Hassan Al-Asmar (1959–2011) was an Egyptian singer and actor from Qena Governorate. He released his debut album in 1984. Al-Asmar died of a heart attack on 7 August 2011, aged 51.
