= Tariq Teguia =

Algerian film director, screenwriter and producer (born 1966)

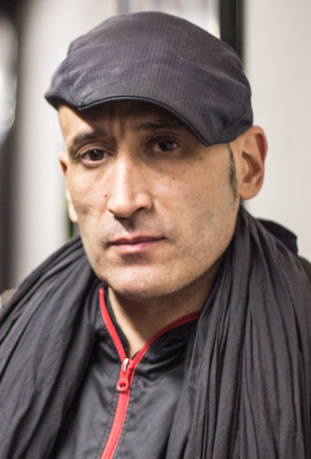
- Teguia in 2013
- Born: Tariq Teguia; 1966 (age 59–60); Algeria
- Occupations: Director; producer; screenwriter
- Notable work: Gabbla

Tariq Teguia (Arabic: تقية طارق, romanized: Taqīyah Ṭāriq; born 1966) is an Algerian film director, screenwriter and producer.

== Life and career ==
He studied visual arts and philosophy in Paris. He was an arts history teacher and a photographer, before filming some well-regarded shorts in the 1990s and a 2003 documentary short.

His 2006 feature film debut, Rome wa la n-toura (Rome Rather Than You), won the Special Jury Prize at the 2007 Fribourg International Film Festival. Variety magazine critic Robert Koehler praised "Tariq Teguia’s highly accomplished debut ... Although the final moments are foreseeable, both the getting there and the immediate aftermath show Teguia to be a director of major promise". Eric Henderson dissented, writing in Slant Magazine that the film was "arrogantly conceived, pretentiously executed, and petulantly protracted".

Teguia's next film, Gabbla (2008), was awarded the FIPRESCI Prize at the 2008 Venice International Film Festival and the Daum Special Jury Prize at the 2009 Jeonju International Film Festival. The 2013 Entrevues Belfort film festival Grand Jury Prize went to his Thwara Zanj (Zanj Revolution) (2013).

== Filmography ==
- Haçla (2003 documentary short; director, screenwriter, producer)
- Roma wa la n'toura (Rome Rather Than You) (2006; director, screenwriter, producer)
- Gabbla (Inland) (2008; director, screenwriter, producer)
- Venice 70: Future Reloaded (2013 documentary)
- Thwara Zanj (Zanj Revolution) (2013; director, screenwriter)
