= Echorouk Group =

Echourouk Group
- Industry: Media
- Founded: 1 November 2011
- Headquarters: Algiers, Algeria
- Key people: Ali Foudil
- Products: Television production Film production & distribution
- Subsidiaries: Echorouk El Yawmi; Echorouk News TV; Echorouk TV; CBC Benna
- Website: Echourouk Group

Echourouk Group SA (Echourouk Group) is an Algerian Generalist channel, Information and Sport. It is headquartered in Algiers. Two years after the official launch of Echorouk TV, on 19 March 2014, the Foundation launched another channel, Echorouk News TV, and three years later Echourouk Group launched a special channel for women and cooking, CBC Benna.

== Corporate divisions ==
Logo	Channel	Launched	Availability				Format	Broadcast Hours
Logo	Channel	Launched	DTT	Satellite	IPTV	Cable	Format	Broadcast Hours
	Echourouk	2012	Yes	Yes	Yes	Yes	16:9 SDTV	24 hours
	Echourouk HD	2015	Yes	Yes	Yes	Yes	1080i HDTV	24 hours
	Echourouk News	2014	Yes	Yes	Yes	Yes	16:9 SDTV	24 hours
	Echorouk Plus	2019	No	Yes	Yes	No	16:9 SDTV	24 hours
