= Echorouk Plus =

Coordinates: 36°44′01″N 3°05′11″E

Echorouk +
- Country: Algeria
- Broadcast area: North Africa; Middle East
- Network: Echorouk Channels
- Headquarters: Algiers, Algeria

Programming
- Languages: Arabic; Amazigh
- Picture format: 576i, DVB-S2 SDTV

Ownership
- Owner: Echorouk Media & Publishing Group
- Sister channels: Echorouk TV; Echorouk News TV

History
- Launched: 19 March 2015 (as Benna TV); 17 January 2019 (as Echorouk+)
- Closed: 31 December 2019
- Former names: Benna TV (2015–2017); CBC Benna (2017-2019)

Links
- Website: tv.echoroukonline.com

Benna TV logo and wordmark. (2015–2017)

Alternative logo of the channel. (2015–2017)

Echourouk + and sometimes written Echorouk Plus (Arabic: الشروق بلوس) formerly CBC Benna TV (Arabic: سي بي سي بنة) was an Algerian basic cable and satellite television channel owned by Echourouk Group, The channel aired both specials and regular talk shows and youth programmes.

== History ==
Benna TV was founded on 19 March 2015; it changed its name to CBC Benna in 2017 but continued to specialize in cooks and food. It changed completely to Echorouk + when its programming became oriented towards youth.

== Programs ==
This is a list of programs broadcast by Echorouk+ :

Program name		Content	Presented by	Air date(s)		Current
Original	English	Content	Presented by	Original	Rerun	Current
Rayna Hak	This is our opinion	Talk show	Abdelkader Djeriou			Yes
Iftah Kalbaq	Open your Hearth	Talk show	Salima Souakri	Saturday 9 pm		Yes
Ma3a Fati -Chez Fati	At Fati	Talk show	Mohamed Khassani	Friday 9 pm		Yes
Hikayat Djazayria	Algerian stories	Talk show	Tayeb Kaci	Sunday 9 pm		Yes
Sabah Echourouk	Echorouk Morning	Talk show	Lotfi Aichouni; The twins Sara and Souad Naima	Everyday 8 am	—N/a	Yes
Eight studio		Musical	Manel Gherbi	Thursday 9 pm		Yes
Drama night		Turkish series	—N/a	Wednesday 9 pm	—N/a	Yes
Box office		Movies	—N/a	Tuesday 9 pm		Yes

=== Other shows ===
- Kara Sevda
- Diriliş: Ertuğrul
- Yu Gi Oh
- The Adventures of Tintin
