= Echorouk TV =

Coordinates: 36°44′01″N 3°05′11″E

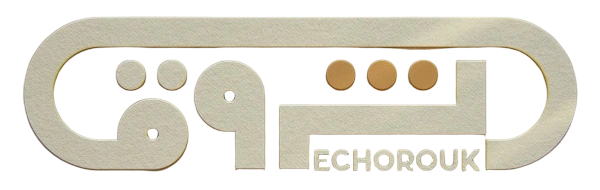
- Logo used since 2025
- Country: Algeria
- Broadcast area: North Africa; Middle East; France; United States; Canada; Europe
- Network: Echourouk Media
- Headquarters: Abdelkader Sefir Press House, Kouba, Algiers

Programming
- Languages: Arabic; French
- Picture format: 1080i HDTV; DVB-S2 SDTV

Ownership
- Owner: Echourouk Group
- Sister channels: Echourouk News; Echorouk Plus

History
- Launched: March 6, 2012; 14 years ago
- Replaced: Echorouk 2

Links
- Website: tv.echoroukonline.com

Availability

Terrestrial
- DTT (Algeria): Currently not available

Streaming media
- Echourouk Channels (Algeria): Watch live (HD)
- myTV (U.S.): Watch live (HD)

Echorouk TV (Arabic: الشروق تي في) is an Algerian Arabic language satellite television channel broadcasting from Algiers. Echourouk TV was set up by Echourouk Group with a number of Arab intellectuals from Algeria and the Arab World.

== History ==
Echorouk TV was founded on 1 November 2011, it has started to broadcast its programs on 6 March 2012.

== Operation ==
Chief executive officer

- Ali Fodil

Commercial/marketing director

News director

== Other services ==
=== Echorouk TV HD ===
Echorouk TV HD, a simulcast of Echourouk TV in high-definition (HD), was launched in June 18, 2015. The channel simulcasts a network version of Echourouk TV in High Definition, with HD versions of its programs.

=== Video-on-demand ===
Logo of Echorouk Channels, the channel's website.

Echorouk TV provides video on demand access for delayed viewing of the channel's programming via its desktop and mobile website at EchouroukOnline.com, which allows users to view past and present episodes of Echourouk TV shows in addition to its live programming stream.

== Logo ==
Evolution of Echorouk TV logo

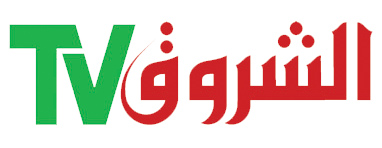
March 2012 – June 2012

June 2012 – October 2014

October 2014 – January 2021

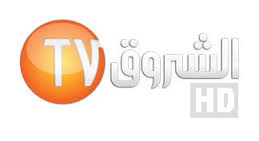
June 2015 – July 2015 (HD version)

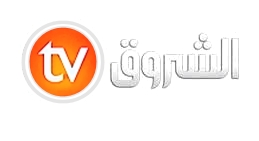
January 2021 - October 2025

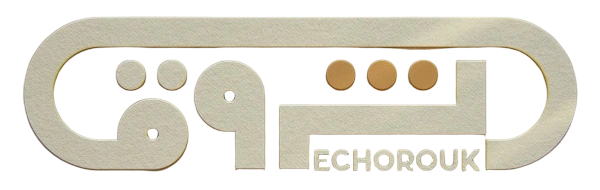
October 2025 - present

== See also ==
- DZ Comedy Show
