= List of Algerian submissions for the Academy Award for Best International Feature Film =

Best International Feature Film submissions from Algeria

Highlights
- Debut: 1969
- Submissions: 27
- Nominations: 5
- Oscar winners: 1

Algeria has submitted films for the Academy Award for Best International Feature Film (Note: The category was previously named the Academy Award for Best Foreign Language Film, but this was changed to the Academy Award for Best International Feature Film in April 2019, after the Academy deemed the word "Foreign" to be outdated.) since 1969. The award is handed out annually by the United States Academy of Motion Picture Arts and Sciences to a feature-length motion picture produced outside the United States that contains primarily non-English dialogue. It was not created until the 1956 Academy Awards, in which a competitive Academy Award of Merit, known as the Best Foreign Language Film Award, was created for non-English speaking films, and has been given annually since.

As of 2026, Algeria has been nominated five times, winning once for Z (1969), directed by Greek dissident filmmaker Costa-Gavras.

== Submissions ==
The Academy of Motion Picture Arts and Sciences has invited the film industries of various countries to submit their best film for the Academy Award for Best International Feature Film since 1956. The International Feature Film Committee oversees the process and reviews all the submitted films. Following this, they vote via secret ballot to determine the five nominees for the award.

Z (1969), directed by Greek dissident filmmaker Costa-Gavras, is the only Algerian film to win the category, and was also the first African film to win it. The other two filmmakers nominated were: the Italian filmmaker Ettore Scola for Le Bal (1983); and the French filmmaker Rachid Bouchareb for Dust of Life (1995), Days of Glory (2006), and Outside the Law (2010).

A running theme in the Algerian submissions has been the relationship between Algeria and its former colonial power, France. Hi Cousin! (1996) and Inch'Allah Dimanche (2001) follow the lives of recent Algerian immigrants in France, while Cheb (1991) follows a young man who returns to his native Algeria after many years studying in France. Three others take a historical look at relations; The Last Image (1987) tells the story of a young French schoolteacher who arrives in a small town under the control of Vichy France at the start of World War II; while Days of Glory (2006) follows a cadre of Algerian soldiers who fight in the French army during the same war; Chronicle of the Years of Fire (1975) shows the beginning of Algerian War for independence from France through the eyes of a peasant.

Most of the films are primary in French or Arabic, the two official languages in Algeria, with the exception of Little Senegal (2000), which is mainly in Wolof. Below is a list of the films that have been submitted by Algeria for review by the academy for the award by year and the respective Academy Awards ceremony.

Year (Ceremony)	Film title used in nomination	Original title	Language(s)	Director(s)	Result
1969 (42nd)	Z		French, Russian, English	Costa Gavras	Won Academy Award
1975 (48th)	Chronicle of the Years of Fire	وقائع سنين الجمر	Arabic, French	Mohammed Lakhdar-Hamina	Not nominated
1982 (55th)	Sandstorm	رياح رملية	French, Arabic	Mohammed Lakhdar-Hamina	Not nominated
1983 (56th)	Le Bal		No dialogue	Ettore Scola	Nominated
1987 (60th)	The Last Image	La dernière image	French	Mohammed Lakhdar-Hamina	Not nominated
1991 (64th)	Cheb		French, Arabic	Rachid Bouchareb	Not nominated
1994 (67th)	Autumn: October in Algiers	Automne... Octobre à Alger	French, Arabic	Malik Lakhdar-Hamina	Not nominated
1995 (68th)	Dust of Life	Poussières de vie	French, Vietnamese	Rachid Bouchareb	Nominated
1996 (69th)	Hi Cousin!	Salut cousin!	French, Arabic	Merzak Allouache	Not nominated
2000 (73rd)	Little Senegal		Wolof, English, French, Arabic	Rachid Bouchareb	Not nominated
2001 (74th)	Inch'Allah Dimanche	إن شاء الله الأحد	Arabic, French	Yamina Benguigui	Not nominated
2002 (75th)	Rachida		Arabic, French	Yamina Bachir Chouikh	Not nominated
2006 (79th)	Days of Glory	بلديون	Arabic, French	Rachid Bouchareb	Nominated
2008 (81st)	Masquerades	مسخرة	Arabic, French	Lyès Salem	Not nominated
2009 (82nd)	London River		French, English	Rachid Bouchareb	Disqualified
2010 (83rd)	Outside the Law	خارجون عن القانون	French, Arabic	Rachid Bouchareb	Nominated
2012 (85th)	Zabana!	زبانة	Arabic, French	Said Ould Khelifa	Not nominated
2015 (88th)	Twilight of Shadows	غروب الظلال	Arabic	Mohammed Lakhdar-Hamina	Not nominated
2016 (89th)	The Well	Le puits	French	Lotfi Bouchouchi	Not nominated
2017 (90th)	Road to Istanbul	La Route d'Istanbul	French	Rachid Bouchareb	Not nominated
2018 (91st)	Until the End of Time	إلى آخر الزمان	Arabic	Yasmine Chouikh	Not nominated
2019 (92nd)	Papicha	بابيشة	Arabic, French	Mounia Meddour	Not nominated
2020 (93rd)	Héliopolis	هيليوبوليس	Arabic, French	Djaâfar Gacem	Withdrawn
2021 (94th)	Héliopolis	هيليوبوليس	Arabic, French	Djaâfar Gacem	Not nominated
2022 (95th)	Our Brothers	Nos frangins	French	Rachid Bouchareb	Not nominated
2024 (97th)	Algiers	متر 196	Arabic, French	Chakib Taleb-Bendiab	Not nominated
2026 (99th)	Roqia	رقية	Arabic	Yanis Koussim	Pending

== See also ==
- List of Academy Award winners and nominees for Best International Feature Film
- List of Academy Award-winning foreign language films
