= Soomekh =

Soomekh is a surname which is very common among Persian Jews. Notable people with the surname include:

- Bahar Soomekh (born 1975), Iranian-born American actress
- Saba Soomekh, American professor and writer
