= Nguyên Lê =

French jazz musician and composer

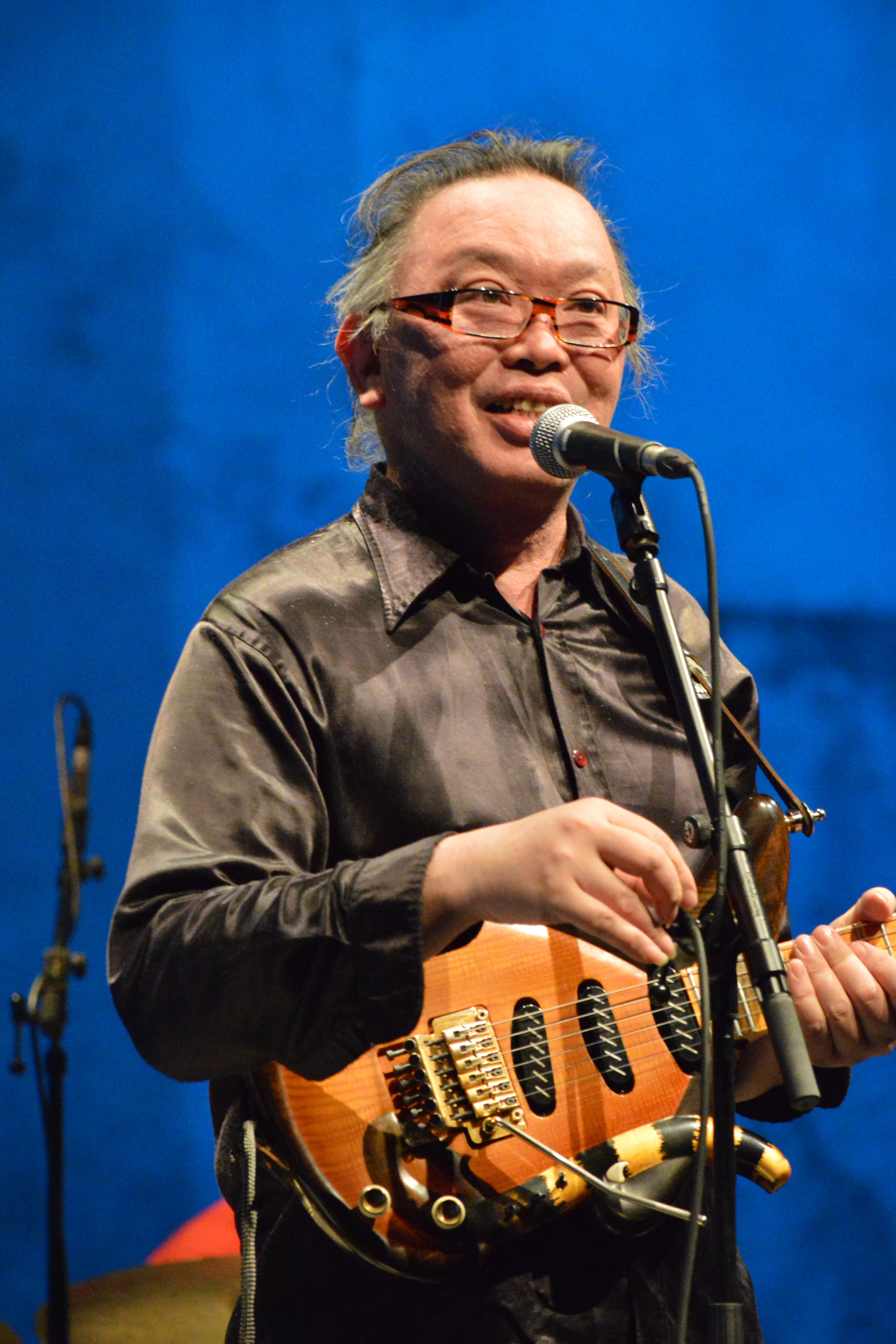
- Nguyên Lê 2013

Background information
- Also known as: Lê Hong Nguyên
- Born: 14 January 1959 (age 66); Paris, France
- Genres: Jazz, jazz fusion
- Occupations: Musician, composer, producer, arranger, sound engineer
- Instrument: Guitar
- Website: www.nguyen-le.com/Site_Nu/Bio_US.html

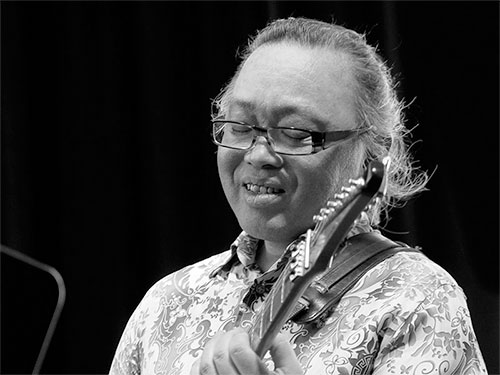
Nguyên Lê at Aarhus Jazz Festival

Nguyên Lê (Vietnamese: Lê Thành Nguyên; born 14 January 1959) is a French jazz musician and composer of Vietnamese ancestry. His main instrument is guitar, and he also plays bass guitar and guitar synthesizer.

He has released albums as a leader and as a sideman. His 1996 album Tales from Viêt-Nam blends jazz and traditional Vietnamese music. Nguyên Lê has performed with Randy Brecker, Vince Mendoza, Eric Vloeimans, Carla Bley, Michel Portal, Renaud Garcia-Fons, Per Mathisen, Marc Johnson, Peter Erskine, Trilok Gurtu, Paolo Fresu and Dhafer Youssef.

In spring 2011 he released Songs of Freedom, an album with cover versions of pop hits from the 1970s.

== Bands ==
- Nguyên Lê Trio
  - Nguyên Lê: guitars, arrangements
  - Michel Alibo: electric bass
  - Karim Ziad: drums, percussion
- Nguyên Lê "Jimi's back"
  - Nguyên Lê: guitars, arrangements
  - Himiko Paganotti: vocals
  - Romain Labaye: bass guitar
  - Gergő Borlai: drums
- Nguyên Lê "Purple - Celebrating Jimi Hendrix"
  - Nguyên Lê: guitars
  - Michel Alibo:bass guitar
  - Terri Lyne Carrington: drums, vocals
  - Aïda Khann: vocals
  - Corin Curschellas: vocals
  - Me'shell Ndegeocello: bass guitar
  - Karim Ziad: percussion
  - Bojan Zulfikarpasic: piano
- Huong Thanh & Nguyên Lê - "Dragonfly"
  - Huong Thanh: vocals
  - Nguyên Lê: guitars, arrangements
  - Hao Nhien: traditional instrument zither
  - Dan Bau: flute, percussion
  - François Verly: percussion, synthesizer
  - Michel Alibo: bass guitar
  - Joël Allouche: drums/percussion
- Nguyên Lê Quartett:
  - Nguyen Le: guitars
  - Paul McCandless: saxophone, clarinet
  - Art Lande: piano
  - Jamey Haddad: percussion
- ELB (Erskine - Lê - Benita)
  - Peter Erskine: drums
  - Nguyên Lê: guitars, guitar synthesizer
  - Michel Benita: double bass
- Nguyên Lê "Songs of Freedom":
  - Nguyen Le: guitars, laptop
  - Himiko Paganotti: vocals
  - Illya Amar: vibes/electronics
  - Romain Labaye: bass, vocals
  - Stephane Galland/Gergo Borlai: drums
- Nguyen Lê & the Dark Side Nine (Celebrating Dark Side of the Moon)
  - Nguyen Lê: guitars, electronics, arrangements
  - Himiko Paganotti: vocals
  - Illya Amar: vibes & electronics
  - Gergo Borlai: drums
  - Romain Labaye: bass guitar
  - Stéphane Guillaume: tenor and soprano sax
  - Sylvain Gontard: trumpet
  - Celine Bonacina: baritone and alto sax
  - Daniel Zimmermann: trombone
- Nguyên Lê Streams Quartet
  - Illya Amar: vibes & electronics
  - Chris Jennings: bass
  - John Hadfield: drums and percussion

== Discography ==
=== As leader ===
- 1990: Miracles (Musidisc), with Art Lande, Marc Johnson and Peter Erskine
- 1992: Zanzibar (Musidisc), with Paul McCandless, Joël Allouche
- 1995: Million Waves (ACT), with Dieter Ilg and drummer Danny Gottlieb
- 1996: Tales from Vietnam (ACT), with Huong Thanh, Hao Nhien, Paolo Fresu, Trilok Gurtu, Simon Spang-Hanssen, Michel Benita
- 1997: Three Trios (ACT)
- 1998: Maghreb & Friends (ACT)
- 1999: Moon and Wind (ACT), with Huong Thanh
- 2000: Bakida (ACT), with Renaud Garcia-Fons and Tino di Geraldo featuring Carles Benavent
- 2002: Purple – Celebrating Jimi Hendrix (ACT)
- 2005: Walking on the Tiger's Tail (ACT) with Paul McCandless, Art Lande and Jamey Haddad
- 2006: Homescape (ACT), duos with Paolo Fresu and Dhafer Youssef
- 2007: Fragile Beauty (ACT), with Huong Thanh
- 2009: Saiyuki (ACT)
- 2011: Songs of Freedom (ACT)
- 2014: Celebrating Dark Side of the Moon (ACT)
- 2017: Hà Nội Duo (ACT), featuring Ngo Hong Quang
- 2019: Streams (ACT)

=== As sideman ===
With Safy Boutella

- 1992: Mejnoun (Indigo)

Within Uri Caine Ensamble

- 2006: Uri Caine Ensemble Plays Mozart (Winter & Winter)
- 2009: The Othello Syndrome (Winter & Winter)

Within ELB, including with Peter Erskine and Michel Benita

- 2001: ELB (ACT)
- 2008: Dream Flight (ACT), featuring Stéphane Guillaume

Within Andy Emler Mega Octet

- 1992: Head Games (Label Bleu)

With Paolo Fresu

- 1998: Angel (BMG France/RCA Victor)
- 2012: Cinquant'Anni Suonati – 2 (Gruppo Editoriale L'Espresso S.p.A.)

With François Moutin and André Ceccarelli

- 1993: Init (Phonogram), featuring Bob Berg

With Cæcilie Norby, Lars Danielsson, and Leszek Możdżer

- 2013: Silent Ways (ACT)

With Romano/Sclavis/Texier + Enrico Rava, Bojan Z

- 2012: 3+3 (Label Bleu)

Within Ultramarine

- 1985: Programme Jungle (Bloomdido)
- 1989: Dé (America)
- 2007: E Si Mala (Universal Music France)

With Dhafer Youssef

- 1999: Malak (Enja), including with Markus Stockhausen, Renaud Garcia-Fons, and Jatinder Thakur

With Tùng Dương

- 2013: Độc đạo (Dihavina)
