= Kutché =

Studio album by Khaled and Safy Boutella
- Released: 1988
- Recorded: 1987–1988
- Studio: Artistic Palace (Paris); Paradise (London)
- Genre: Raï
- Length: 42:36
- Label: Zone Music
- Producer: Martin Meissonnier; Safy Boutella

Khaled chronology
Hada Raykoum (1985)	Kutché (1988)	Khaled (1992)

Safy Boutella chronology
Kutché (1988)	Mejnoun (1992)

Professional ratings
Review scores
Source	Rating
Allmusic	4.5/5 stars

Kutché is a studio album from Algerian artists Cheb Khaled and Safy Boutella. It is the only collaboration between the two artists. Khaled would later rise to be one of the most famous raï artists outside Algeria, while Safy Boutella would continue his career as a jazzman in Europe.

The album was re-released by Stern's Music and Intuition Music.

The title track Kutché is the cover of a popular Moroccan song, originally named Moul el Koutchi. This name comes from the Spanish coche and indicates horse-drawn carriages used for the transport of people, now mainly tourists, in cities like Marrakech or Meknes. The lyrics are very allusive and can be interpreted in different ways. La Camel is a cover of a Cheikha Rimitti song and Chebba is a cover of an Ahmed Zergui song.

== Reception ==
AllMusic awarded the album with 4.5 stars and its review by Bob Tarte states: "Collaboration between Paris-based keyboard-whiz Safy Boutella and one of raï's most powerful voices sets tough standards for other discs".

== Track listing ==
- All songs written by Cheb Khaled and Safy Boutella, except where noted.
1. "La Camel" – 5:33
2. "Kutché" – 5:59 (trad.; arr./adapted Khaled/Boutella)
3. "El Lela" – 5:02
4. "Baroud" – 3:58 (trad.; arr./adapted Khaled/Boutella)
5. "Chebba" – 5:48
6. "Hana-Hana" – 5:26 (Khaled)
7. "Chab Rassi" – 5:04 (trad.; arr./adapted Khaled/Boutella)
8. "Minuit" – 5:51 (Khaled)

== Personnel ==
- Cheb Khaled – vocals, accordion, synthesizer solo, bendir
- Safy Boutella – bass, synthesizer, keyboards, Linn 9000 programming, backing vocals, musical conception and arrangements
- Nicolas Neidhardt – keyboards, synthesizers, programming
- Boffi Banengola – drums
- Noureddine Boutella – guitar (tracks 1, 3, 4, 5 & 6)
- Jean-Jacques Hertz – guitar (tracks 1, 3, 5, 6 & 8)
- Raphaël Faÿs – acoustic guitar (track 4)
- Zouhi Gouja – oud (track 1)
- Cheb Kada – synthesizer solo (track 3)
- Allan Hoist – alto saxophone solo (track 3)
- Djaffar Bensetti – trumpet (tracks 3, 4 & 8)
- Dahey Abdelhakim, Mohamed Seif, Allah Benabderrezak – violin
- Samya – vocals (track 6)
- Amina Ben Mustapha – vocals (tracks 1 & 5)
- Atem Bidaoui – darbouka, tar
