= Djalti =

El Djalti
- جلطي
- Directed by: Mohamed Ifticene
- Written by: Abdelkader Alloula
- Produced by: RTA (Radio Télévision Algérienne)
- Starring: Larbi Zekkal, Warda Hamitouche, Azzedine Abas
- Music by: Ahmed Malek
- Release date: 1980
- Running time: 94 minutes
- Country: Algeria
- Language: Arabic

El Djalti (Arabic: الجلطي) is a 1980 Algerian drama film directed by Mohamed Ifticene and produced by RTA. The film follows the wandering of a teenage boy from Oran after a violent dispute with his father, reflecting the Algerian television fiction style of the 1970s–1980s.

== Synopsis ==
In Oran, Djalti, a teenage boy, has a violent argument with his father and threatens him. Djalti runs away during the night for fear of reprisal.

== Technical details ==
- Director: Mohamed Ifticene
- Screenplay: Abdelkader Alloula
- Music: Ahmed Malek
- Cast: Larbi Zekkal, Warda Hamitouche, Azzedine Abas
- Production: RTA / LM Production
- Country: Algeria
- Runtime: 94 minutes

== Production and broadcast ==
The film was produced by RTA as part of Algerian television’s fiction output. It has been screened in tributes and retrospectives highlighting Algeria’s television archives and early film production.

== Reception and analysis ==
El Djalti has been cited in Algerian and African cinema archives as a representative example of television fiction exploring juvenile delinquency and family breakdown in urban settings. Critics and databases (festival archives, academic reviews) highlight its significance within RTA’s 1980s television productions.

== See also ==
- List of Algerian films
- Cinema of Algeria
