= Two Men in Town =

Two Men in Town can refer to:

- Two Men in Town (1973 film), a 1973 French drama film
- Two Men in Town (2014 film), a 2014 American drama, based on the 1973 French film
