= Mejnoun =

Studio album by Safy Boutella
- Released: 1992
- Recorded: June 1991
- Studio: Studio Charles Cros
- Genre: New-age, Raï
- Length: 46:46
- Label: Indigo Records
- Producer: Michel Orier

Safy Boutella chronology
Kutché (1988)	Mejnoun (1992)	Automne, Octobre ^ Alger (1994)

Mejnoun (Possessed) is an album by Algerian musician and composer Safy Boutella, that was released in 1992 on the Indigo record label.

== Track listing ==
All compositions and arrangements by Safy Boutella except "Sister's", which was arranged by Nguyên Lê.

1. "Sud" — 4:09
2. "Orient" — 8:20
3. "Nomade" — 5:25
4. "Shiria" — 5:23
5. "Mejnoun" — 6:32
6. "Apres-Demain" — 4:31
7. "Khmous Alik" — 6:29
8. "Sister's" — 3:51
9. "Sourire" — 2:06

== Personnel ==
- Karim Ziad – drums
- Youcef Boukella – bass
- Nguyên Lê – guitar, guitar synthesiser
- Dominique Pifarély – electric violin
- Naná Vasconcelos – percussion
- Noureddine Boutella – keyboards, guitar
- Mokhtar Samba – drums on "Shiria" and "Khmous Alik"
- Mejdoub Ftati – electric violin on "Orient"
- Rabah Khalfa – percussion on "Orient"
- Sylvie Ayoun – choir on "Sud"
- Safy Boutella – compositions and arrangements, keyboards, programming, chant, percussion
