= Until the End of Time (film) =

2017 film

- Film poster
- Directed by: Yasmine Chouikh
- Written by: Yasmine Chouikh
- Produced by: Karima Chouikh
- Starring: Djillali Boudjemaa; Djamila Arres; Imen Noël; Mohamed Benbekreti; Mohamed Takerti; Mehdi Moulay
- Edited by: Yamina Bachir
- Release date: December 2017
- Running time: 93 minutes
- Country: Algeria
- Language: Arabic

Until the End of Time (Arabic: إلى آخر الزمان) is a 2017 Algerian drama film directed by Yasmine Chouikh. It was selected as the Algerian entry for the Best Foreign Language Film at the 91st Academy Awards, but it was not nominated. The film was the second-ever directed by a woman to be submitted by Algeria to the Academy Awards.

== See also ==
- List of submissions to the 91st Academy Awards for Best Foreign Language Film
- List of Algerian submissions for the Academy Award for Best Foreign Language Film
