= Chafia Boudraa =

Algerian actress (1930-2022)

- شافية بوذراع
- Born: August 22, 1930; Constantine, Algeria
- Died: 22 May 2022 (aged 91); Algiers, Algeria
- Occupation: Actress
- Notable work: El Hariq as Lala Aini; Outside the Law as the mother
- Spouse: Salah Boudraa (died)

Chafia Boudraa (Arabic: شافية بوذراع; 22 August 1930 – 22 May 2022) was an Algerian actress. After decades of acting in films and television, including the television series El Hariq, she starred as the mother in Rachid Bouchareb's 2010 film Outside the Law, which appeared at the 2010 Cannes Film Festival.

== Biography ==
Chafia Boudraa was born Atika Boudraa in Constantine on 22 August 1930. Her husband Salah Boudraa was a National Liberation Front soldier who was killed in the Algerian War in Sahara Province. In 1964, she moved from Constantine to Algiers, where she worked several odd jobs before starting her acting career.

Boudraa worked in the acting industry for over five decades. She got her first break in acting in theatrical productions; her stage roles included the Widow in the Algerian National Theater Mahieddine Bachtarzi's production of The Taming of the Shrew. In the 1970s, Boudraa received national attention by appearing in the television series El Hariq as Lala Aini; Ahmed Bedjaoui said that this role led to her discovery. She appeared in such films as L'Évasion de Hassan Terro (1974), Leïla et les Autres (1977), Le Mariage de Moussa (1982), Une femme pour mon fils (1982), Un vampire au paradis (1992), Le Cri des hommes (1999). One of her last appearances was as the mother in Rachid Bouchareb's 2010 film Outside the Law, which appeared at the 2010 Cannes Film Festival.

ObservAlgérie called her the "doyenne of Algerian actresses", noting "she left her mark on Algerian cinema and theatre by playing roles in numerous films, serials and plays". France Télévisions called her a "leading figure in Algerian cinema and theater". She also received the nickname "La mère des Algériens" (lit. The Mother of Algerians).

Boudraa died on 22 May 2022 in Algiers; she was 92. Prime minister Aymen Benabderrahmane offered his condolences regarding her death, as well as that of her co-star Ahmed Benaissa (who had died a few days earlier).

== Filmography ==
=== Film ===
- L'Évasion de Hassan Terro (1974)
- Leïla et les Autres (1977)
- Le Mariage de Moussa (1982)
- Une femme pour mon fils (1982)
- Un vampire au paradis (1992)
- Le Cri des hommes (1999)
- Outside the Law (2010), mother

=== Television ===
- El Hariq, Lala Aini
