= Boutella =

Boutella is an Algerian surname that can refer to:

- Safy Boutella (born 1950), Algerian musician, arranger, composer, and record producer
- Sofia Boutella (born 1982), Algerian actress, model, and dancer, daughter of Safy Boutella
