= Djaffar Bensetti =

Algerian trumpeter (1962–2023)

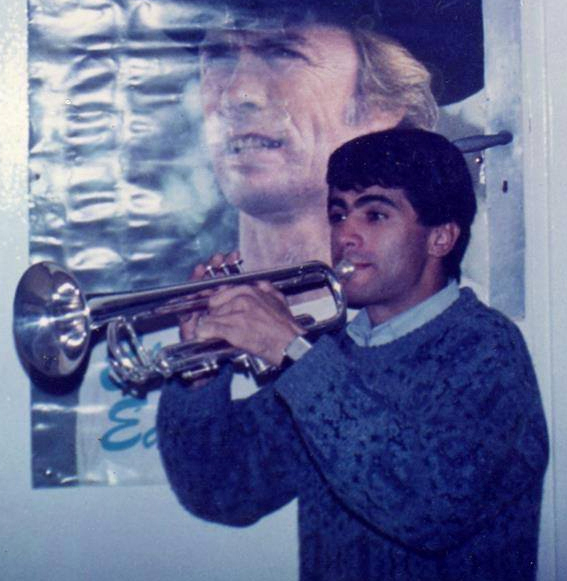
- Djaffar playing the trumpet
- Born: 24 December 1962; Oran, Algeria
- Died: 8 June 2023 (aged 60); Saint-Denis, Paris, France

Haouari Djaffar Ben Setti (in Arabic: جعفر بن ستي) (24 December 1962 – 8 June 2023), known as Djef, was an Algerian trumpeter and saxophonist. He collaborated with numerous singers such as Khaled, Mami, Sahraoui, Fadela, and Rachid Taha, as well as Marc Moulin, participating in their albums and accompanying them on international tours. He was the uncle of actor Rayane Bensetti.

== Biography ==
=== Early life ===
Djaffar Bensetti was born in December 1962 in the northwest of Algeria, in the city of Oran, specifically in the Boulanger neighborhood. He was the brother of Bachir Bensetti, who died in February 2018, and the uncle of actor Rayane Bensetti.

=== Career ===
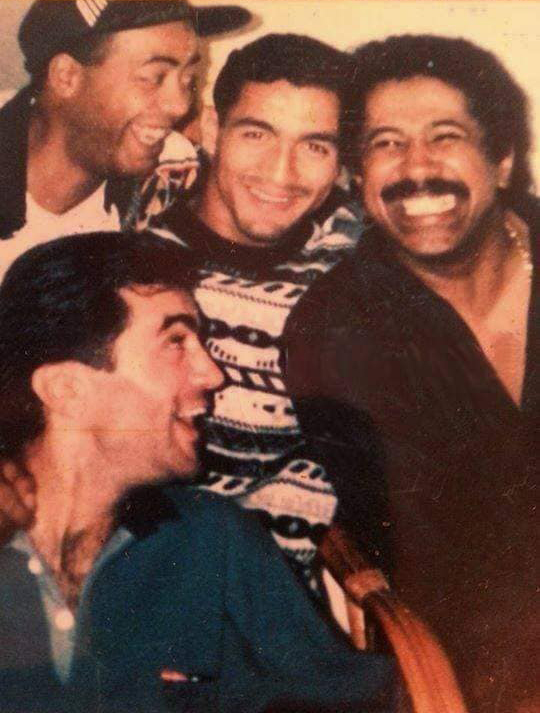
Djaffar Bensetti (in the blue t-shirt) is seen alongside Khaled, accompanied by keyboardist Kada (the man wearing the cap).

Djaffar shared in an interview that his passion for the trumpet was ignited by Messaoud Bellemou, a trumpeter from Aïn Témouchent, as well as by his musical idols such as Umm Kalthoum, Ahmed Wahby, Belaoui Houari, his brother Mohamed Maghni, and Miles Davis. He learned to play the trumpet from a Spanish musician named Philiberto Serna, who was living in Oran.

Djaffar began his career as a trumpeter with Mohamed Belarbi's orchestra, where he became active in the late 1970s and early 1980s on RTA d'Oran.

He collaborated with many raï singers, including Khaled, where he was present during the recording of Khaled's first album in 1978 and later became part of his music group for tours. He played the trumpet in the iconic song "Didi," which gained worldwide popularity. He also collaborated with Cheb Mami on the song "El Ghalia," as well as with other artists such as Fadela, Rachid Taha, and Marc Moulin, accompanying them on international tours in Europe, Latin America, Japan, Egypt, and around the world.

Furthermore, he participated in the collective chant for the 1998 FIFA World Cup song with Messaoud Bellemou. He was the only Algerian in the 1, 2, 3 Soleils orchestra, which consisted of 60 musicians.

Kouider Berkane, the conductor of Khaled's group, attests that during a concert in Cairo in 1995 with Cheb Khaled, the audience was surprised. Djaffar performed compositions using a quarter of the maqam scale on the trumpet. This performance astonished the Egyptians, who were not accustomed to hearing him play the instrument in this way, as they were more familiar with the flute.

=== Trumpet ===
Djaffar owned a unique trumpet crafted by a 90-year-old Italian artisan, adorned with precious stones.

== Death ==
Djaffar Bensetti died on 8 June 2023, in Paris, in Montreuil, Seine-Saint-Denis where he resided, after battling an illness. His body was repatriated to Oran and laid to rest on 10 June after the Asr prayer at the Ain El Baida cemetery. Testimonies affirm that he had expressed a desire to visit his hometown on several occasions, but due to his contraction of COVID-19, he was unable to make the visit.

== Discography ==
Here is a non-exhaustive list of some of Djaffar Bensetti's collaborations:

- 1988 : Kutché - Khaled, Safy Boutella
- 1989 : Hana Hana - Chaba Fadela and Cheb Sahraoui
- 1991 : L'Enfant De Demain - Time Warner
- 1996 : Tout L'Temps Nerveuse - Nadim
- 1997 : Five - Hamid Baroudi
- 1997 : Mister Sax - Said Houmaoui
- 1998 : Hafla - Khaled
- 1998 : 1, 2, 3 Soleil - Rachid Taha, Khaled, Faudel
- 1999 : Kenza - Khaled
- 2001 : Top Secret - Marc Moulin
- 2001 : Gouraya - Djamel Allam
