= Just like a Woman (2012 film) =

2012 film directed by Rachid Bouchareb

- Film poster
- Directed by: Rachid Bouchareb
- Written by: Rachid Bouchareb; Marion Doussot; Joëlle Touma
- Produced by: Allen Bain; Jean Bréhat; Charles S. Cohen; Francesca Manno; Jesse Scolaro
- Starring: Sienna Miller; Golshifteh Farahani
- Cinematography: Christophe Beaucarne
- Edited by: Yannick Kergoat
- Music by: Éric Neveux
- Production companies: Tessalit Productions; Taghit
- Distributed by: Cohen Media Group
- Release date: December 14, 2012
- Running time: 87 minutes
- Countries: France; United Kingdom; United States
- Language: English

Just like a Woman is a 2012 English-language film directed by Rachid Bouchareb, starring Sienna Miller and Golshifteh Farahani. The narrative follows an American housewife and a North African woman who travel from Chicago to Santa Fe to participate in a bellydance competition. The film is a co-production between companies in France, the United Kingdom and the United States. Bouchareb intends it to be the first in a trilogy about the relation between North America and the Arab world.

== Plot ==
The film depicts a few days in the lives of two women, Marilyn and Mona who, on the outside, could not be more different. Marilyn is an American-born menial secretary at a small business. Mona is an Egyptian immigrant who manages the convenience store next door with her mother-in-law and her husband, Mourad. During brief encounters, the women find solace in each other from the stress of their daily lives. Marilyn's husband, Harvey, is unemployed. Feeling jealous and emasculated, he criticizes her taking part in a belly-dancing class (believing that she is too old) and uses her money to spend his nights drinking at bars. Meanwhile, Mona endures the constant plague of verbal abuse from her mother-in-law who blames her for not conceiving a child. Though in love with his wife, Mourad refuses to stand up to his mother, a disappointment that leaves Mona feeling depressed and alone in their marriage.

One day, Marilyn comes to work and is fired due to the recession. Distraught and angry, she goes home and is disgusted to see Harvey having sex with another woman in their bed. Acting on advice from her dance coach, Marilyn decides to attend an audition for a dance company in Santa Fe and leaves Chicago without telling Harvey. On the same day, Mourad's mother reveals that she has found him a new wife who will bear a child within a year. Distracted by the news, Mona spills her mother-in-law's pillbox and, in her haste to collect the pills, gives her the wrong dosage. The next morning, Mourad finds his mother dead. Horrified by the discovery that she is responsible, Mona flees, intent on leaving the country. Later on, the police question Mourad about her whereabouts. At the same time, Marilyn ignores Harvey's calls and is intent on driving 1,300 miles to Santa Fe. At a rest stop, she sees Mona and assumes that she too has fled her unhappy life at home. She invites her to come along and Mona agrees to be her dance partner for the gigs they will be performing along the way.

While on the journey, the women bond as they realize that although they come from vastly different cultures, they share a like-mind and a desire to be free from the upsets of the past. Mona assures Marilyn that she is not too old to be dancing (citing the example of famed Egyptian dancer Samia Gamal) and Marilyn defends Mona from the advances of a night-club owner at their first gig. While backstage, Marilyn finds a newspaper with a photo of Mona in a missing person's ad. Mona insists that her mother-in-law's death was accidental, but Marilyn is furious and accuses her of making her an accomplice in a getaway. Though conflicted, Marilyn leaves Mona on a Native American reservation with the money she has earned and drives off to Santa Fe alone. Minutes later, however, she gets a call from Harvey (who has since reported her missing) and breaks down with the realization that in ten years of marriage, they have done nothing as a couple. Knowing now that she has received more support from Mona than from anyone else in years, Marilyn goes back to the reservation and apologizes. The friends make up over their reflections on motherhood and their resolve to have Marilyn succeed at the audition in the next two days.

While at a campsite, the women's presence and the foreignness of their dancing provokes a racist woman who hurls insults at Mona. Marilyn defends her heatedly and the woman retaliates by having her husband and son assault her, breaking her arm and dashing her hopes of performing. Quelled by this latest disaster, Mona calls Mourad, who has been sitting on the front lawn for days awaiting her return. He promises her a new start in a different city where they can adopt children, but Mona sees the fallacy of a life in which her mother-in-law's death will always cast a shadow on their marriage. She tells Mourad that she is coming back to Chicago to turn herself in, but not before giving one last thank you to Marilyn. At the auditions, Mona performs under Marilyn's name and is approved by the judges. Knowing that there is no way they will believe she was Mona, however, Marilyn catches up to her at the train station and tears up the certificate of acceptance. She chooses, instead, to go back to Chicago and support Mona when she confronts the police. Content to put the past behind them, they hold hands and dance on the platform, ready to face the future together however uncertain it may be.

== Cast ==
- Sienna Miller as Marilyn
- Golshifteh Farahani as Mona
- Bahar Soomekh as Soha
- Tim Guinee as George
- Roschdy Zem as Mourad
- Chafia Boudraa as Mourad's mother
- Richard Jose as Ezhno
- Jesse Harper as Harvey
- Sayed Badreya as Tarek
- Usman Ally as Ousman
- Doug James as George's father
- Deanna Dunagan as George's mother

== Casting choices ==
Mayte Garcia who is best known for being the ex-wife of legendary rock superstar Prince was first offered the role of Marilyn as well as to choreograph the belly dancing sequences in the film but had to decline due to scheduling conflicts with the show Hollywood Exes. Latin pop superstar Shakira was considered for the role as well. Lady Gaga lobbied hard for the role of Marilyn. Sasha Alexander was offered the role of Marilyn but couldn't fit the role into her schedule as she was busy with the show Rizzoli & Isles.

== Production ==
Tessalit Productions produced the film together with Taghit, which is the American subsidiary of Rachid Bouchareb's company 3B Productions. It was co-produced by Arte France Cinéma, the British The Bureau and the American Cohen Media Group. Filming started in June and ended on 5 August 2011.
