= Le Mariage de Moussa =

- Directed by: Tayeb Mefti
- Written by: Tayeb Mefti; Mustapha Mangouchi
- Produced by: ONCIC
- Starring: Mohamed Salah Hafidi; Benyoucef Benbouzid; Chafia Boudraa; Youcef Sayah; Larbi Zekkal
- Music by: Ahmed Malek
- Release date: 1982
- Running time: 110 minutes
- Country: Algeria
- Language: Arabic / French

Le Mariage de Moussa (lit. "The Marriage of Moussa") is a 1982 Algerian film directed by Tayeb Mefti. The film tells the story of a young Algerian emigrant who is forced to return to his country, where he will be forced to marry.

== Synopsis ==
Moussa, a young French-Algerian man, returns to his homeland. Faced with a difficult situation, he has just chosen to return to France when he is called up for civil service. This situation works in his favor, as he is secretly in love with his cousin Nacira.

== Technical details ==
- Director: Tayeb Mefti
- Screenplay: Tayeb Mefti & Mustapha Mangouchi
- Runtime: ~110 minutes
- Genre: Comedy / Social drama
- Country of origin: Algeria
- Language: Arabic / French

== Cast ==
- Mohamed Salah Hafidi as Moussa
- Benyoucef Benbouzid
- Chafia Boudraa as Moussa's mother
- Youcef Sayah
- Larbi Zekkal
- Slimane Laib

== Production and background ==
The film was produced in post-independence Algeria, during a period marked by migratory flows, emigration, and the challenges of returning home and social reintegration. Tayeb Mefti, the director, had previously made several short films, and Le Mariage de Moussa represents his most significant feature-length work.

== See also ==
- Tayeb Mefti
- Chafia Boudraa
- Larbi Zekkal
