= Roqia =

2025 thriller film by Yanis Koussim

- Algerian promotional poster
- Arabic: رقية
- Directed by: Yanis Koussim
- Written by: Yanis Koussim
- Produced by: Farès Ladjimi
- Starring: Ali Namous; Akram Djeghim; Mostefa Djadjam; Hanaa Mansour; Lydia Hanni; Abdelkrim Derradji
- Cinematography: Jean-Marie Delorme
- Edited by: Maxime Pozzi-Garcia; Sarah Zaanoun
- Production companies: Supernova Films; 19; Mulholland Drive Production
- Distributed by: Alpha Violet; Watermelon Pictures
- Release date: 1 September 2025 (Venice)
- Running time: 94 minutes
- Countries: France; Algeria; Qatar; Saudi Arabia
- Language: Arabic

Roqia (Arabic: رقية) is a 2025 psychological thriller film written and directed by Yanis Koussim. A co-production of France, Algeria, Qatar, and Saudi Arabia, it stars Ali Namous, Akram Djeghim, Mostefa Djadjam, Hanaa Mansour, and Lydia Hanni.

The film had its world premiere in the International Critics’ Week section of the 82nd Venice International Film Festival on 1 September 2025. It was also selected as the Algerian entry for the Best International Feature Film at the 99th Academy Awards.

== Cast ==
- Ali Namous
- Akram Djeghim
- Mostefa Djadjam as Raqi
- Hanaa Mansour
- Lydia Hanni
- Abdelkrim Derradji as Abdelkrim

== Release ==
On July 23, 2025, Roqia was acquired by the French company Alpha Violet for global distribution. In December 2025, the US distribution rights were acquired by Watermelon Pictures.

== Critical reception ==
Middle East Eye named Roqia "possibly the most effective Arab horror this century."

Screen Daily lauded Koussim's ability to turn the real, dark history of the Algerian Civil War into a classic possession story.

AwardsWatch gave the film a B, concluding that "Roqia draws parallels between exorcism and radicalization in sometimes brilliant, sometimes clunky ways." Ioncinema gave it three out of five stars, finding it "successful in its narrative scope" albeit a little predictable.

Dread Central appreciated how Koussim used possession "to explore the aftereffects of seemingly never-ending cycles of violence" rather than approach "the usual good versus evil conversation that leans towards religious propaganda."

Cineuropa found that the film successfully employed the "classic ingredients of horror cinema" to "shed light on the vampires of fundamentalism... which must be remembered at all costs to prevent their return."

== See also ==
- List of submissions to the 99th Academy Awards for Best International Feature Film
- List of Algerian submissions for the Academy Award for Best International Feature Film
