= Road to Istanbul =

2016 film

- Film poster
- Directed by: Rachid Bouchareb
- Written by: Rachid Bouchareb
- Starring: Astrid Whettnall
- Release dates: 12 February 2016 (Berlin); 22 April 2016 (France)
- Running time: 97 minutes
- Countries: Algeria; France
- Language: French

Road to Istanbul (French: La Route d'Istanbul) is a 2016 French-Algerian drama film directed by Rachid Bouchareb. It was shown in the Panorama section at the 66th Berlin International Film Festival. Whettnall received a Magritte Award for Best Actress at the 7th Magritte Awards for her role in the film. It was selected as the Algerian entry for the Best Foreign Language Film at the 90th Academy Awards, but it was not nominated.

== Plot ==
Elisabeth sets off to find her daughter, who has joined the Islamic State in Syria.

== Cast ==
- Astrid Whettnall as Elisabeth
- Pauline Burlet as Elodie
- Patricia Ide as Julie
- Abel Jafri as Turkish policeman

== Production ==
The film was shot in Belgium, Istanbul and Algeria.

== See also ==
- List of submissions to the 90th Academy Awards for Best Foreign Language Film
- List of Algerian submissions for the Academy Award for Best Foreign Language Film
