= Ahmed Bedjaoui =

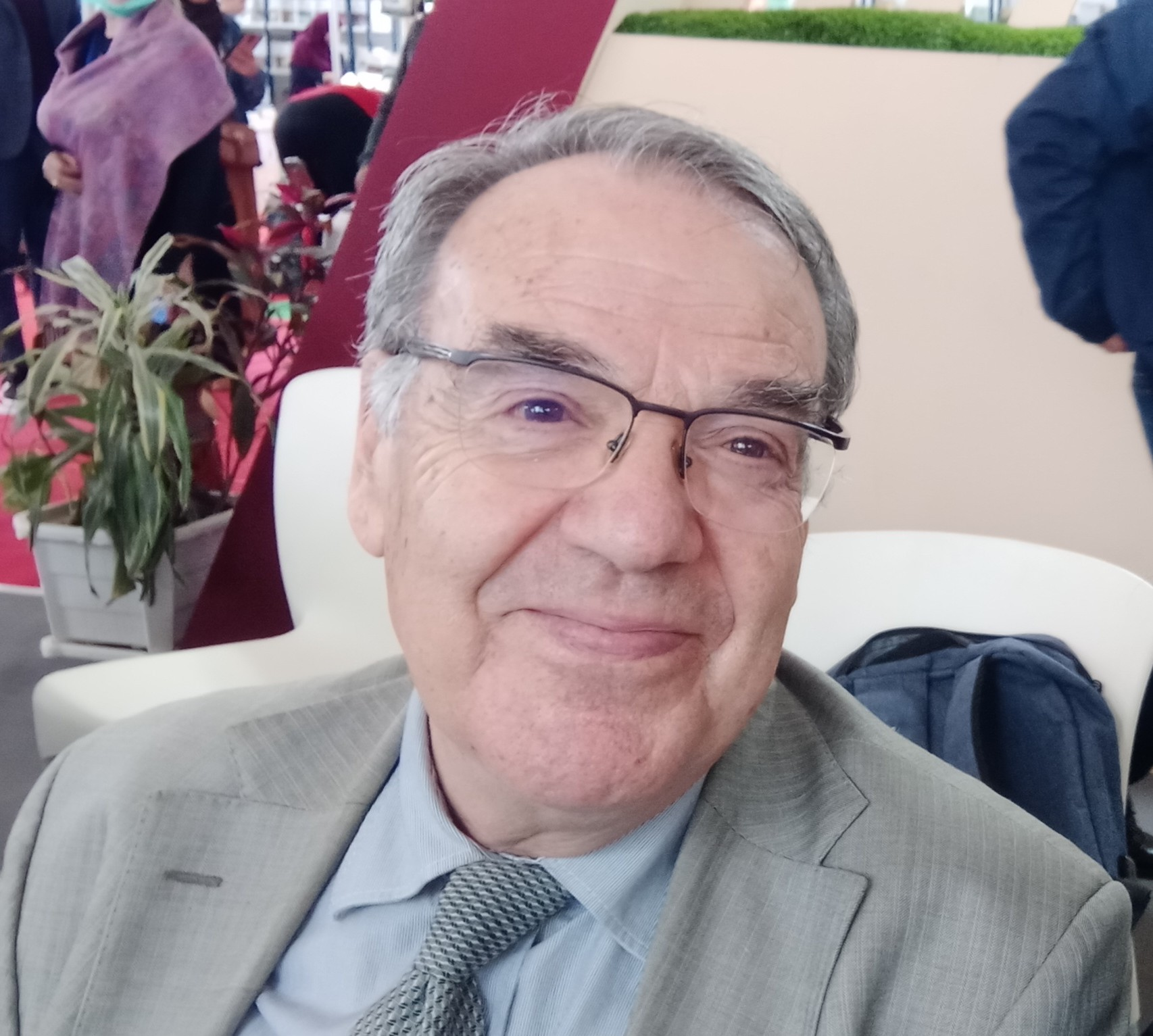
- Ahmed Bedjaoui (Algiers Book Fair 2022)
- Born: 1943 (age 82–83); Algeria
- Occupations: Film director, producer, critic, academic
- Notable work: Le Grand Détour, Histoires de la révolution
- Television: Télé Ciné Club

Ahmed Bedjaoui (born 1943) is a film director, producer, critic, and academic. He is known for his early films of the late 1960s and for hosting and producing the iconic television program Télé Ciné Club, which he presented for twenty years. He is also known for his academic and editorial work on Algerian cinema.

== Biography ==
Ahmed Bedjaoui studied cinema at the IDHEC (Institut des hautes études cinématographiques) in Paris and earned a PhD in American Civilization and Literature. A university professor, he taught audiovisual journalism and film studies at the University of Algiers 3. Still active in Algeria's cultural scene, he was one of the pioneering founders of the Algerian Cinémathèque, a film critic for several newspapers and magazines (both Algerian and international), founder and president of the International Biennale of Film and Archaeology of Tipasa, and artistic director of the Algiers International Festival. He also served as director and programmer for various international events. Bedjaoui is a member of the executive board of the International Council for Film, Television and Audiovisual Communication (CICT) under UNESCO, and holds positions in several Algerian film institutions. In 2015, he was awarded the Fellini Medal for his contribution to the defense and promotion of cinema worldwide.

== Career and contributions ==
Ahmed Bedjaoui hosted for several decades the television program Télé Ciné Club, which became a cornerstone of cinematic education and discovery for generations of Algerian viewers. He directed short and medium-length films in the late 1960s and produced or co-produced major works of Algerian cinema. Among the dozens of films he produced are Nahla by Farouk Beloufa, the two feature films by Assia Djebar, Bouamama by Benamar Bakhti, and Kahla Oua Beida by Abderrahmane Bouguermouh. He also published several books on Algerian cinema, particularly on representations of the War of Independence.

== Filmography ==
=== Director ===
- 1968: Le Grand Détour
- 1969: Histoires de la révolution — collective film (multiple directors including Ahmed Bedjaoui)
- 1974: Le Doigt dans l'engrenage

=== Producer (1976–1985, over 70 feature films for RTA) ===
- Executive producer on Boualem Zid El Goudam (1980) by Moussa Haddad (credited as producer)
- Nahla (1981) by Farouk Beloufa
- La Nouba des femmes du Mont Chenoua (1978) and La Zerda ou les chants de l'oubli (1982) by Assia Djebar
- Kahla oua Beida (1981) and Les Oiseaux de l'Été (1978) by Abderrahmane Bouguermouh
- Bouamama (1984) by Benamar Bakhti
- Le Défi (1980) and Libération (1982) by Moussa Haddad
- Les Rameaux de feu (1984) by Mohamed Ifticene

=== Television ===
- Télé Ciné Club (1969–1989) — host / critic (landmark television show about cinema)

== Publications / Bibliography ==
- Images et visages, au cœur de la bataille de Tlemcen (Tlemcen, late 1960s / script / illustrated by Denis Martinez) — Chihab Editions, 2012. ISBN 978-9961-63-880-4
- Cinéma et guerre de libération : Algérie, des batailles d’images — Chihab Editions, 2014. ISBN 978-9947-39-073-3
- La guerre d’Algérie dans le cinéma mondial – Mille et une fiches de films traitant de la guerre d’Algérie à travers le monde — Chihab Editions, 2016. ISBN 978-9947-39-114-3
- Les cinémas arabes et la littérature (with Michel Serceau) — L’Harmattan, “Images Plurielles: Scènes & Écrans” series, 2019. ISBN 978-2-343-17979-7
- Littérature et cinémas arabes — Chihab, 2022. ISBN 978-9947-39-216-4
- Cinema and the Algerian War of Independence: Culture, Politics, and Society — Palgrave Macmillan, 2021. ISBN 978-3030379964
- Le Cinéma à son âge d'or — Chihab, 2022
- Scott Fitzgerald et ses contemporains face à la machine hollywoodienne — Casbah Éditions, 2023
- Le cinéma algérien en 44 leçons — Walid Meziani Éditions, 2024
- Algerian Cinema in Forty Five Lessons — Palgrave Macmillan, 2025
- Ten Decades of Algerian Cinema — Chihab, 2025

== Awards and positions ==
- Speaker and programmer for international events (e.g., film screenings and thematic programs); former cultural official involved in Algerian cinema institutions (Cinémathèque, three-time president of the FDATIC film support fund, contributor to multiple national and international festivals, jury president at FESPACO 2018).

== See also ==
- Cinema of Algeria
- Television in Algeria
