= Close Enemies (film) =

2018 film

- Film poster
- Directed by: David Oelhoffen
- Written by: David Oelhoffen
- Produced by: Margaux Balsan; Marc du Pontavice
- Starring: Matthias Schoenaerts
- Cinematography: Guillaume Deffontaines
- Edited by: Anne-Sophie Bion
- Distributed by: O'Brother Distribution (Belgium); BAC Films (France)
- Release dates: 1 September 2018 (Venice); 3 October 2018 (Belgium); 3 October 2018 (France)
- Running time: 111 minutes
- Countries: Belgium; France
- Language: French
- Box office: $ 1.3 million

Close Enemies (French: Frères ennemis) is a 2018 Belgian-French crime drama film directed by David Oelhoffen. It was selected to be screened in the main competition section of the 75th Venice International Film Festival.

== Plot ==
Imrane and Manuel, members of an Arabic crime family, celebrate their friend Nouri's release from jail. Nouri's contacts in jail lead them to a drug deal. Urged on by Imrane, Manuel sets up the deal. En route, they are ambushed in a drive-by that results in the deaths of Imrane and Sergio. Manuel escapes but becomes the primary suspect of both the criminal underworld and the police. Driss, an Arabic narcotics officer who grew up with Manuel and the others, reveals to Manuel that Imrane was working as an informant. Manuel initially refuses to believe this and rejects his offer to work together. Already distrusted by his fellow police officers, Driss experiences further difficulty in the Arabic community when he attempts to make contact with family and former friends during his investigation.

Driss comes under pressure to solve the embarrassing loss of his informant. Manuel, too, is pressured by crime boss Raji to find who killed Imrane, his son. After another attempt to kill him, Manuel reluctantly agrees to work with Driss. Manuel kills Carminatti, a gangster he believes to have sold them out to the killer. Using Carminatti's phone, Driss tracks a call to a burner phone but warns Manuel that homicide detectives intend to arrest him. Driss advises Manuel to allow himself to be arrested, as he will likely be released for lack of evidence. As Manuel considers his options, he tracks the burner phone to Jean-Marc, who admits Carminatti gave him a tip. Jean-Marc eventually reveals that Raji is behind the order to kill them and asked Nouri to arrange it. Manuel disbelieves this but consults with Driss. Driss says Raji is likely making amends to corrupt Moroccan officials for an unauthorized drug deal organized by Imrane and Manuel.

After Manuel's estranged ex-wife, Manon, gives him an alibi, the police release him. Driss pushes Manuel to replace Imrane as his informant and continue the original drug deal that got Imrane killed. The deal goes poorly, and Manuel learns there is now a contract on his life. Driss goes in early to save Manuel's life but arouses suspicion among the drug dealers that Manuel is an informant. Driss, knowing that Manuel can not escape the crime scene without jail time if he wants to survive, insists that Manuel must give himself up. Manuel asks to be given a few hours before he is arrested, during which he warns Manon and his son Yvan that he will likely be going away for a while. Manuel breaks into Raji's house and confronts him. Raji admits to ordering the hit but says he did it to protect his family, admitting that it has instead destroyed everyone's life. Guessing Manuel's course of action, Driss arrives, only to see Manuel execute Raji. Manuel leaves the house, only to be shot and killed outside, leaving the viewer to conclude that Nouri replaces Raji in the Moroccan hierarchy.

== Cast ==
- Matthias Schoenaerts as Manuel
- Reda Kateb as Driss
- Adel Bencherif as Imrane Mogalia
- Sofiane Zermani as Fouad
- Sabrina Ouazani as Mounia
- Gwendolyn Gourvenec as Manon
- Nicolas Giraud as Rémi Rufo
- Astrid Whettnall as The chief
- Marc Barbé as Marc
- Raphaël Thiéry as Curro Reyes

== Release ==
The film had its world premiere in the main competition section of the 75th Venice International Film Festival on 1 September 2018. It was released in theaters on 3 October 2018 and by Netflix on 29 January 2020.

== Reception ==
=== Critical response ===
On review aggregator Rotten Tomatoes, the film holds an approval rating of 58% based on 12 reviews, with an average rating of 6.3/10. The website's critics consensus reads, "While Close Enemies is a perfectly well-produced film noir, it is too predictable and derivative to make an impact."
