= Tim Guinee =

American actor (born 1962)

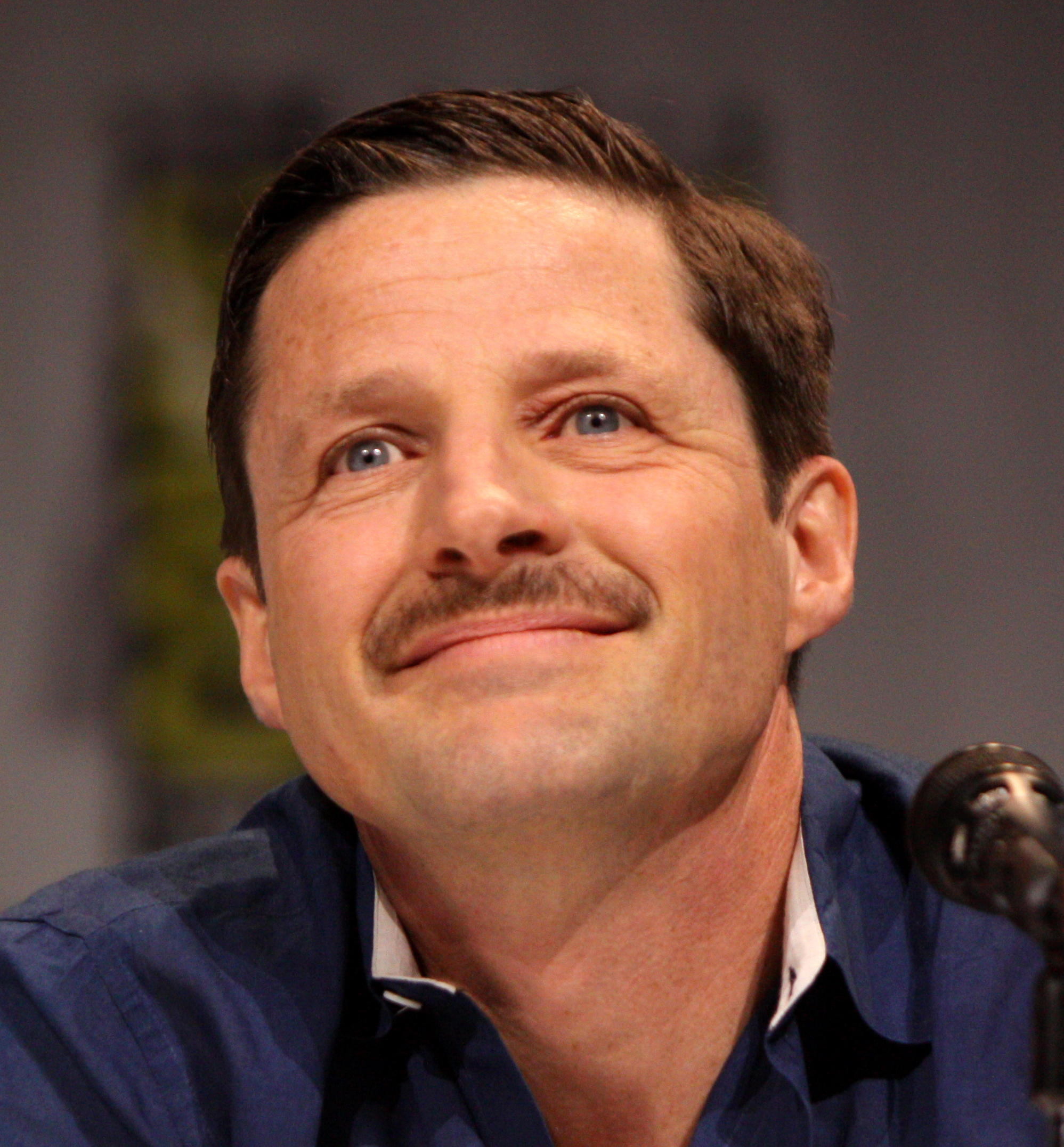
- Guinee at the 2013 WonderCon
- Born: November 18, 1962 (age 63); Los Angeles, California, U.S.
- Education: University of North Carolina School of the Arts (BFA)
- Occupations: Actor; Volunteer firefighter
- Years active: 1986–present
- Spouse: Daisy Foote (m. 1997)
- Relatives: Horton Foote (father-in-law)

Timothy S. Guinee (born November 18, 1962) is an American stage, television, and feature-film actor. Primarily known for his roles as Tomin in the television series Stargate SG-1 (1997–2007) and railroad entrepreneur Collis Huntington in Hell on Wheels (2011–2016), he appeared in the Marvel Cinematic Universe (MCU) feature films Iron Man (2008) and Iron Man 2 (2010) as United States Air Force Major Allen, and as struggling father and retired major Clay Wilson in the first season of the Netflix television series The Punisher (2017–2019).

== Early life and education ==
Timothy S. Guinee was born in Los Angeles, California and raised in Illinois and Texas. As a child, he enjoyed nature, and he wrote to Jacques Cousteau at the age of 13.

He attended Kinder High School for the Performing and Visual Arts in Houston, Texas.

He moved to New York City in order to attend the American Academy of Dramatic Arts. He later attended the University of North Carolina School of the Arts in Winston-Salem, where he graduated and had his film debut.

== Career ==
Guinee is known for his role as Tomin in the television series Stargate SG-1. In 2005, he starred as record producer Sam Phillips in the Golden Globe® Award-winning miniseries Elvis. Guinee stars as Ben Matheson in Revolution.

He was a cast regular in AMC's Hell on Wheels, playing railroad entrepreneur Collis Huntington. Hell on Wheels aired on AMC from November 6, 2011, to July 23, 2016.

== Personal life ==
Guinee met his wife Daisy Foote, during the production of Hallmark Hall of Fame: Lily Dale (1996). Foote is the daughter of 1962 Academy Award–winning screenwriter and Pulitzer Prize–winner Horton Foote, who adapted Lily Dale for the film himself. They live in Marbletown, New York in the Hudson Valley.

Guinee is a volunteer firefighter, having decided to become one after the September 11 attacks, as well as after his house burned down.

== Filmography ==
=== Film ===
Year	Title	Role	Notes
1986	Tai-Pan	Culum Struan	
1989	American Blue Note	Bobby	
1991	Once Around	Peter Hedges	
1992	Chain of Desire	Ken	
1993	The Night We Never Met	Kenneth	
1994	Men of War	Ocker	
1995	Black Day Blue Night	Bo Schrag	
1995	How to Make an American Quilt	Young Dean	
1996	Beavis and Butt-Head Do America	Hoover Dam Guide, AFT Agent	Voice
1996	Courage Under Fire	Warrant Officer One A. Rady	
1996	The Pompatus of Love	Runyon	
1996	Sudden Manhattan	Adam	
1998	John Carpenter's Vampires	Father Adam Guiteau	
1998	Blade	Dr. Curtis Webb	
1999	The Young Girl and the Monsoon	Jack	
2004	Ladder 49	Captain Tony Corrigan	
2005	Sweet Land	Young Olaf	
2007	Broken English	Mark Andrews	
2008	Iron Man	Major Allen	
2008	Stargate: The Ark of Truth	Tomin	
2008	AmericanEast	John Westerman	
2008	Synecdoche, New York	Needleman Actor	
2009	The Private Lives of Pippa Lee	Des Sarkissian	
2010	A Buddy Story	Pete	
2010	Iron Man 2	Major Allen	
2011	The Oranges	Roger	
2011	Water for Elephants	Diamond Joe	
2012	Promised Land	Drew Scott	
2012	Just Like a Woman	George	
2012	The Odd Life of Timothy Green	Marty Rader	Voice
2013	The Pardon	Norman Anderson	
2014	Two Men in Town	Rod	
2014	99 Homes	Frank Greene	
2015	About Scout	Ray Havers	
2015	Growing Up Smith	Officer Bob	
2018	Ben Is Back	Phil	
2019	Ash	Stan	
2019	Harriet	Thomas Garrett	
2021	The Same Storm	Phil H.	
2024	Horizon: An American Saga – Chapter 1	James	

=== Television ===
Year	Title	Role	Notes
1986	The Equalizer	Rick	Episode: "Nightscape"
1986	Spenser: For Hire	Kevin Moran	Episode: "Home Is the Hero"
1987	Crime Story	Vince Romero	Episode: "Little Girl Lost"
1988	Lincoln	Elmer E. Ellsworth	2 episodes
1988	Vietnam War Story	Matthews	Episode: "An Old Ghost Walks the Earth"
1988	Wiseguy	Ritchie Stramm	4 episodes
1989	Knightwatch	Kurt	2 episodes
1989	A Man Called Hawk	Mitchell O'Connor	Episode: "Life After Death"
1989	Livin' Large	Kevin	Television film
1990	L.A. Law	Brian Chisolm	4 episodes
1991	Golden Years	Fredericks	4 episodes
1991	Mission of the Shark: The Saga of the U.S.S. Indianapolis	Dobson	Television film
1993	Alex Haley's Queen	Wesley	2 episodes
1993	Daybreak	OHH Officer	Television film
1993	Comics	Johnny Lazar	2 episodes
1994	Breathing Lessons	Jesse Moran	Television film
1995	Follow the River	Will	Television film
1995	Silver Strand	Lance Surrey	Television film
1995	Duke of Groove	Let It Go Guy	Television film
1996	Lily Dale	Horace Robedaux	Television film
1997	The Three Lives of Karen	Matt	Television film
1998	The Outer Limits	Corporal Charles Pendelton	Episode: "Relativity Theory"
1998	Brave New World	John Cooper	Television film
1999–2002	Strange World	Capt. Paul Turner	13 episodes
2000	Level 9	Det. John Burrows	Episode: "Mail Call"
2000	Animated Epics: Moby Dick	Ishmael	Television film
2001	Law & Order	Mark Landry / Richard Morriston	Episode: "Hubris"
2001	The Suitor	Dex	Television film
2002	The Practice	Reverend Michael Crane	Episode: "Eyewitness"
2002	The Road from Coorain	Alec	Television film
2002	Warning: Parental Advisory	John Denver	Television film
2002	Thieves	Eddie	Episode: "The Green and the Black"
2002	Law & Order: Criminal Intent	David Bishop	Episode: "Bright Boy"
2003	The Guardian	Todd Doherty	Episode: "The Intersection"
2003	Karen Sisco	Derwood Edson	Episode: "Dear Derwood..."
2003	Tarzan	Donald Ingram	4 episodes
2004	The Division	Paul	Episode: "Be Careful What You Wish For"
2005	Vinegar Hill	Jake Grier	Television film
2005	CSI: Miami	Carl Dawson	Episode: "Sex & Taxes"
2005	Elvis	Sam Phillips	2 episodes
2006	The West Wing	Steve Laussen	Episode: "Internal Displacement"
2006	In Justice	Richard Rocca	3 episodes
2006	Killer Instinct	Professor Whitfield	Episode: "While You Were Sleeping"
2006	CSI: Crime Scene Investigation	Father Frank Berlin	Episode: "Double Cross"
2006	Medium	Sean Caffey	Episode: "Ghost in the Machine"
2006	The Lost Room	The Occupant / Eddie McCleister	2 episodes
2006–2007	Stargate SG-1	Tomin	3 episodes
2006–2007	Ghost Whisperer	Charlie Filbert	3 episodes
2006, 2011	CSI: NY	Nathan Purdue / Chris Matthews	2 episodes
2007	Friday Night Lights	Bob	Episode: "What to Do While You're Waiting"
2007	Without a Trace	Andrew Reynolds	Episode: "At Rest"
2007	Smallville	Adrian	Episode: "Gemini"
2008	The Mentalist	Tag Randolph	Episode: "Pilot"
2009	Private Practice	Seth	Episode: "Homeward Bound"
2009	NCIS	Lemming / Jerome Sax	Episode: "South by Southwest"
2009	Saving Grace	Kirby	Episode: "The Heart of a Cop"
2009	Life	Gus Wilvern	Episode: "Shelf Life"
2009	Eli Stone	Andrew Carlisle	Episode: "Flight Path"
2009	24	Ken Dellao	3 episodes
2009	Lie to Me	Alec Foster / Ron Foster	4 episodes
2009	Numbers	Glen Olin	Episode: "7 Men Out"
2009	Three Rivers	Jim Santos	Episode: "Where We Lie"
2009	Trauma	Officer Lyons	2 episodes
2009	Criminal Minds	Joe Muller	Episode: "Retaliation"
2010	Nip/Tuck	Joel Seabrook	Episode: "Joel Seabrook"
2010	The Deep End	Neil Levin	Episode: "Nothing Personal"
2010	Miami Medical	Jackson	Episode: "Golden Hour"
2010	Law & Order: LA	Colonel Richards	Episode: "Sylmar"
2010	The Closer	Sam Dodson	Episode: "High Crimes"
2011	Off the Map	Nick	Episode: "I'm Here"
2011	Covert Affairs	Roy Gaskin	Episode: "Bang and Blame"
2011	Person of Interest	Mark Lawson	Episode: "The Fix"
2011	Law & Order: Special Victims Unit	George Zane	Episode: "Educated Guess"
2011, 2012	Damages	Jake Stahl	2 episodes
2011–2015	The Good Wife	Andrew Wiley	10 episodes
2012	Castle	Andrew Haynes	Episode: "47 Seconds"
2012	Fringe	Rick Pearce (Canaan)	Episode: "Everything in Its Right Place"
2012	Perception	Tom Shelby	Episode: "Messenger"
2012	Weeds	Dr. James Cornish	Episode: "Unfreeze"
2012–2014	Revolution	Ben Matheson	10 episodes
2012–2020	Homeland	Scott Ryan	16 episodes
2013–2016	Hell on Wheels	Collis Huntington	14 episodes
2014	Madam Secretary	Paul Wellington	Episode: "Another Benghazi"
2014	How and Why	Dave	Unsold pilot
2014–2019	Elementary	Agent Dean McNally	8 episodes
2015	The Following	Duncan Banks	2 episodes
2015	Forever	Teddy Graves	Episode: "The Night in Question"
2015	Nurse Jackie	Joe	Episode: "Managed Care"
2016	Code Black	Adam Benton	Episode: "First Date"
2016	Motive	Seth Armstrong	Episode: "Natural Selection"
2016	BrainDead	Nicholas Pohl	1 episode
2016	Van Helsing	Ted	2 episodes
2016	Power	Lance Donovan	2 episodes
2016	Conviction	Greg Price	Episode: "Mother's Little Burden"
2016	Blue Bloods	Stuart Wentworth	Episode: "Confessions"
2016, 2017	Bones	Dr. Brandon Faulk	2 episodes
2017	The Affair	Grant Finley	Episode #3.6
2017	I'm Dying Up Here	Matt Patterson	Episode: "The Cost of a Free Buffet"
2017	Time After Time	Dr. Monroe	2 episodes
2017	NCIS: New Orleans	DHS Agent Lamont	Episode: "Rogue Nation"
2017	Ghost Wars	Sheriff Sam Perkins	Episode: "Death's Door"
2017	The Punisher	Clay Wilson	2 episodes
2017	Gone	Ryan Moreland	Episode: "Family Photo"
2018	Blindspot	Boris Sokolov	Episode: "My Art Project"
2019	Bull	AUSA Darryl Holden	Episode: "Forfeiture"
2020	NOS4A2	Nathan Demeter	2 episodes
2021	Clarice	Lucas Novak	Episode: "Ghosts of Highway 20"
2022	Inventing Anna	Paul	5 episodes
2022	The Staircase	Bill Peterson	7 episodes
2025	The Beast in Me	Rick "Wrecking Ball" Jarvis	8 episodes
