= Yasmine Chouikh =

Algerian journalist and film director

- Born: June 15, 1982 (age 43); Algiers
- Occupations: Director; Screenwriter; Journalist
- Notable work: Until The End Of Time
- Parents: Mohamed Chouikh (father); Yamina Bachir (mother)

Yasmine Chouikh (born 1982) is an Algerian screenwriter, film director, and journalist. A prominent voice in contemporary Algerian cinema, her work explores themes of love, tradition, identity, and the role of women in society. She is best known for Until The End of Time (2017), a romantic drama set in an Algerian cemetery, which won the Best First Feature Award at the Panafrican Film and Television Festival of Ouagadougou (FESPACO) in 2019."26e Fespaco: Jusqu'à la fin des temps, de Yasmine Chouikh Remporte le Prix Oumarou Ganda du meilleur premier film" [26th Fespaco: Until the end of time, by Yasmine Chouikh Wins the Oumarou Ganda Prize for best first film]. Algérie Presse Service (in French). 3 March 2019. She also serves as the artistic director of the Taghit International Short Film Festival, promoting new voices in Maghrebi cinema.

== Life ==
Chouikh was born in 1982 in Algiers, the daughter of the film director and screenwriter Yamina Bachir and the actor-director Mohamed Chouikh. She graduated in psychology and education. She is the artistic director of the Taghit International Short Film Festival.

== Films ==
- El bab (The Door) (2006, short film)
- El Djinn (2010, short film)
- Until The End of Time (2017)
