= Cheb (film) =

1991 film

- Directed by: Rachid Bouchareb
- Written by: Rachid Bouchareb
- Starring: Mourad Bounaas
- Release dates: 22 February 1991 (Berlin); 5 June 1991 (France)
- Running time: 79 minutes
- Countries: Algeria; France
- Languages: French; Arabic

Cheb ([ʃɛb], Arabic: شاب, romanized: Shābb, lit. 'young man') is a 1991 Algerian-French drama film directed by Rachid Bouchareb. The film was selected as the Algerian entry for the Best Foreign Language Film at the 64th Academy Awards, but was not accepted as a nominee. It received the Georges Delerue Award for Best Soundtrack/Sound Design at Film Fest Gent in 1991.

== Cast ==
- Mourad Bounaas as Merwan
- Nozha Khouadra as Malika
- Pierre-Loup Rajot as Ceccaldi
- Boualem Benani as Le capitaine
- Fawzi B. Saichi as Garçon du hammam
- Mohamed Nacef as L'adjudant
- Nadji Beida as Miloud

== See also ==
- List of submissions to the 64th Academy Awards for Best Foreign Language Film
- List of Algerian submissions for the Academy Award for Best Foreign Language Film
