= Jacques Frantz =

French actor (1947–2021)

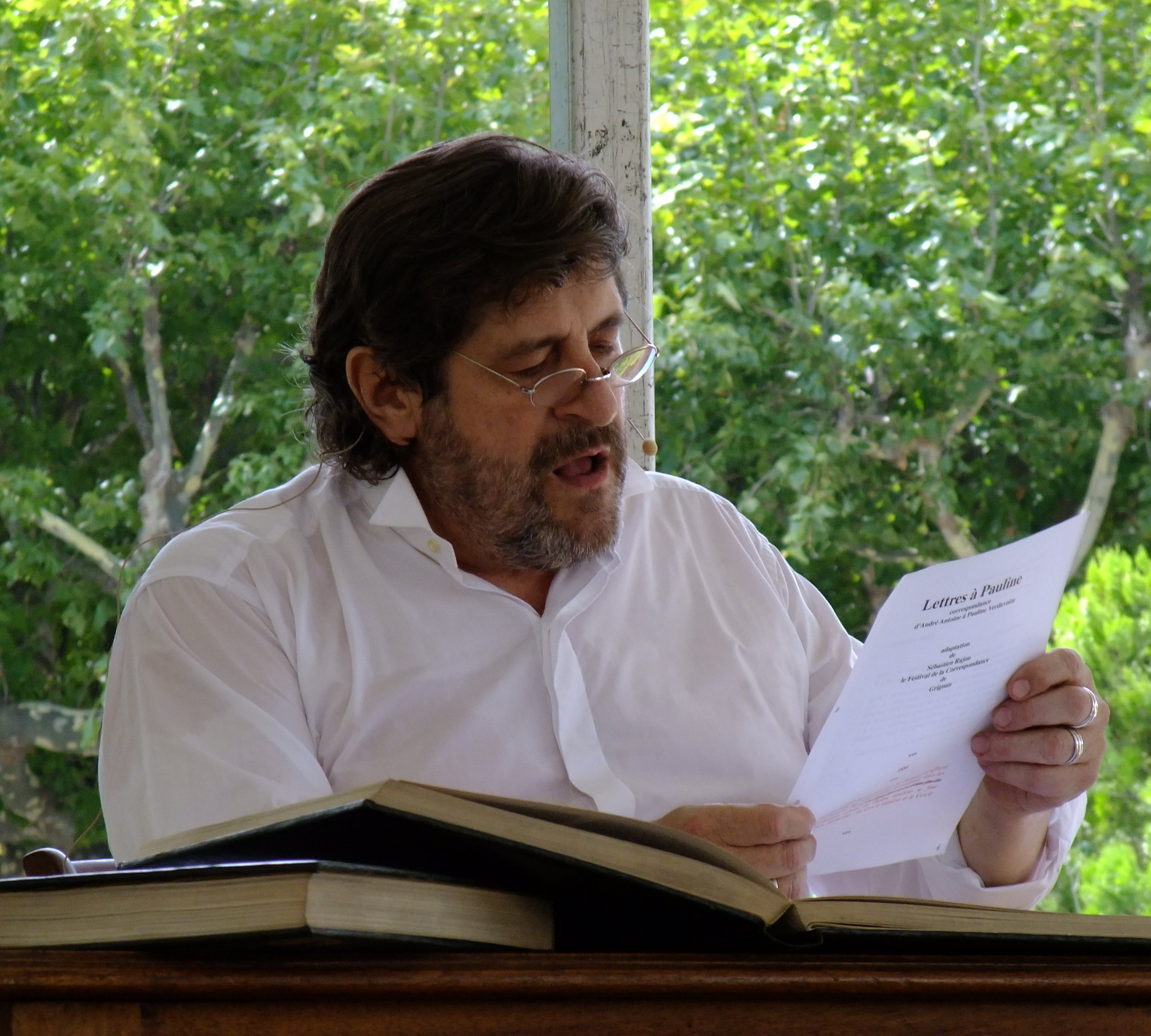
- Jacques Frantz (2010)
- Born: 4 April 1947; Dijon, France
- Died: 17 March 2021 (aged 73); Paris, France
- Occupation: Actor
- Years active: 1965–2021

Jacques Frantz (4 April 1947 – 17 March 2021) was a French actor. Nominated for the Molière Award, he was renowned for his theatre work, and his voice, which he lent to many actors, such as Robert De Niro, Mel Gibson, John Goodman, and Nick Nolte. Frantz also appeared in films. Since October 2013, he was the official voice of the radio station Nostalgie.

== Selected filmography ==
Film
Year	Title	Role	Notes
1978	La Carapate	Rocheteau	
1978	The Little Wheedlers	Marc	
1979	Coup de tête		
1984	The Twin		
1985	Cop au Vin		
1985	Bâton rouge		
1998	Don Juan		
2003	Fanfan la Tulipe		
2006	Asterix and the Vikings		voice only
2009	The Day Will Come	Jean-Marc Muller	
2010	Heartbreaker		
2016	Dieumerci!		

TV
Year	Title	Role	Notes
2003	Lagardère		

Animated films
Year	Title	Role	Notes
1950	Cinderella	Gus	(1991 redub)
1988	The Land Before Time	Daddy Topps	
1989	All Dogs Go to Heaven	Itchy Itchiford	
1996	All Dogs Go to Heaven 2	Itchy Itchiford	
1996	Aladdin and the King of Thieves	Cassim	
1999	Toy Story 2	Al McWhiggin	
2000	The Little Mermaid II: Return to the Sea	Undertow	
2000	The Emperor's New Groove	Pacha	
2001	Lady and the Tramp II: Scamp's Adventure	Buster	
2001	Monsters, Inc.	Sulley	
2002	Cinderella II: Dreams Come True	Gus	
2002	Treasure Planet	John Silver	
2004	Home on the Range	Alameda Slim	
2004	Shark Tale	Don Lino	
2005	The Emperor's New Groove 2: Kronk's New Groove	Pacha	
2007	Arthur and the Invisibles	The King	
2007	Cinderella III: A Twist in Time	Gus	
2009	The Princess and the Frog	Eli "Big Daddy" La Bouff	
2011	Arthur and the Revenge of Maltazard	The King	
2011	Arthur 3: The War of the Two Worlds	The King	
2012	Brave	King Fergus	
2012	ParaNorman	Mr. Prenderghast	
2014	Rio 2	Big Boss	
2015	Home	Captain Smek	
