= Bâton rouge (1985 film) =

1985 film

- Theatrical release poster
- Directed by: Rachid Bouchareb
- Written by: Rachid Bouchareb; Jean-Pierre Ronssin
- Produced by: Lyric International and TF1 Films Production
- Starring: Jacques Penot; Pierre-Loup Rajot; Hammou Graïa
- Cinematography: Jimmy Glasberg
- Edited by: Guy Lecorne
- Music by: John Faure
- Release date: 1985
- Running time: 82 minutes
- Country: France
- Language: French

Bâton Rouge is a 1985 French film directed by Rachid Bouchareb. written by Rachid Bouchareb and Jean-Pierre Ronssin. The film stars Jacques Penot, Pierre-Loup Rajot, and Hammou Graïa.

== Synopsis ==
In a town on the outskirts of Paris, Karim, Abdenour and Mozart search for small acting jobs. Karim's father reassures him that he will someday become someone important. Abdenour, orphaned, promises his brother that he may soon withdraw from welfare. Mozart, a saxophonist, dreams of going to America, to Baton Rouge, Louisiana, which he considers the capital of blues music.

The dream soon becomes a reality in the wake of Abdenour falling in love with Becky, a young American, and thanks to one of his friend's tricks allows all of them to obtain airline tickets to New York City. Their pursuits continue across the Atlantic.

== Cast ==
- Jacques Penot : Alain Lefebvre 'Mozart'
- Pierre-Loup Rajot : Abdenour
- Hammou Graïa : Karim
- Frédéric Wizmane : Bruno
- Katia Tchenko : Director of DASS
- Larbi Zekkal : Karim's father
- Elaine Foster : Victoria Paine
- Romain Bouteille : Monsieur Temporaire
- Jacques Frantz : Fast-food manager
- Christian Charmetant : Architect
- Alexandra Steinbaum : Becky
