= Saba Soomekh =

American religious studies scholar

- Born: Saba T. Soomekh; Teheran, Iran
- Relatives: Bahar Soomekh (sister); Ezra Frech (nephew)
- Awards: Independent Publisher Book Awards Gold Medal (2013)

Academic background
- Education: University of California, Berkeley (B.A. 1998); Harvard Divinity School (M.T.S. 2001); University of California, Santa Barbara (Ph.D. 2008)

Academic work
- Discipline: Religious studies
- Institutions: Loyola Marymount University; California State University, Northridge

Saba T. Soomekh (Persian: صبا سومخ) is an Iranian-born American professor and author.

== Early life and education ==
Soomekh was born in Tehran, Iran, to a Persian-Jewish family, Hamid and Manijeh Soomekh. She is a sister of Hollywood actress Bahar Soomekh, and aunt of Bahar's son, 2024 Summer Paralympics double gold medalist Ezra Frech.

The Iranian-Jewish family moved to Los Angeles, California in 1978 to escape the Islamic Revolution of Iran when Soomekh was two years old.

She attended Beverly Hills High School. She received her bachelor's degree from the University of California, Berkeley in 1998, her Masters in Theological Studies from Harvard Divinity School in 2001, and a Ph.D. in Religious Studies from the University of California, Santa Barbara.

== Teaching career ==
Soomekh is the associate director of research at UCLA's Alan D. Leve Center for Jewish Studies. She was previously a theological studies professor in the Religious Studies Department at California State University, Northridge and at Loyola Marymount University, where she also served as Interim Director of the Jewish Studies program.

Soomekh also teaches at the University of California, Los Angeles, and previously taught at California State University, Fullerton, American Jewish University, and Santa Monica College.

== Writing career ==
Soomekh is the author of From the Shahs to Los Angeles: Three Generations of Iranian Jewish Women between Religion and Culture published by State University of New York Press. The book won the 2013 Independent Publisher Book Awards gold medal for religion. She has written extensively on the Iranian Jewish community and on women in the Middle East.

== See also ==
- List of Iranian women in academia
