= Little Senegal (film) =

2001 film by Rachid Bouchareb

- Theatrical release poster
- Directed by: Rachid Bouchareb
- Written by: Rachid Bouchareb; Olivier Lorelle
- Starring: Sotigui Kouyaté; Sharon Hope; Roschdy Zem; Karim Traoré; Adetoro Makinde; Adja Diarra; Malaaika Lacario
- Music by: Safy Boutella
- Release date: 2001
- Running time: 97 minutes
- Countries: Algeria, France, Germany
- Languages: Wolof, English, French, Arabic

Little Senegal is a 2001 Algerian film directed by Rachid Bouchareb. It was Algeria's submission to the 73rd Academy Awards for the Academy Award for Best Foreign Language Film, but was not accepted as a nominee.

== Plot ==
Alloune, a guide at the museum of slavery on the Gorée island of Senegal, decides to go to New York City to look for his descendants who were deported there. His trip takes him from Senegal's fields to Le Petit Senegal in the Harlem neighborhood of Manhattan, where he finds one person from his family.

== Description ==
The purpose of the movie is to explore the African roots of Black American people who claim African origins but ignore their cultural past. The movie led to the attribution of the name Little Senegal to a district in Upper Manhattan populated with Senegalese and other West African people, located in Harlem on West 116th Street, between Fifth and Eighth Avenues.

== Cast ==
- Sotigui Kouyaté ... Alloune
- Sharon Hope ... Ida
- Roschdy Zem ... Karim
- Karim Traoré ... Hassan (credited as Karim Koussein Traoré)
- Adetoro Makinde ... Amaralis
- Adja Diarra ... Biram
- Malaaika Lacario ... Eileen
- Toy Connor ... Girl on Bridge (supporting)

== See also ==
- List of submissions to the 73rd Academy Awards for Best Foreign Language Film
