= Bahar Soomekh =

American actress

- بهار سومخ
- Born: Tehran, Iran
- Education: University of California, Santa Barbara (B.A. 1997)
- Occupation: Actress
- Years active: 2002–2014, 2026–present
- Notable credit(s): Crash, Saw franchise
- Spouse: Clayton Frech (m. 2001)
- Children: 3, including Ezra Frech
- Relatives: Saba Soomekh (sister)
- Website: web.archive.org/web/20150209052446/http://www.labahar.com/

Bahar Soomekh (Persian: بهار سومخ) is an Iranian-American realtor and actress, best known for her roles in Crash and the Saw franchise.

== Early life and education ==
Bahar was born in Tehran, Iran, to an observant Jewish family. She moved with her parents and sister, Saba Soomekh, to Los Angeles, California, United States in 1979 during the Islamic Revolution of Iran. Soomekh attended Sinai Akiba Academy and Beverly Hills High School.

Bahar later attended the University of California, Santa Barbara. She graduated in 1997 with a B.A. in environmental studies.

== Career ==
After graduating from UCSB, Soomekh worked in motivational sales while taking acting classes. At the beginning of her acting career, Soomekh guest starred on several television programs, including JAG and 24. She ultimately quit her day job to pursue acting full-time and landed her role in Crash less than three months later.

Soomekh's breakthrough role came as Dorri in the Academy Award-winning movie for Best Picture, Crash. Following her success in Crash, People magazine listed Soomekh as a member of the Class of 2006 as "New on the Scene". She followed up with roles in Syriana and Mission: Impossible III. In 2006, she had a leading role as Dr. Lynn Denlon in the horror film Saw III. Soomekh had a recurring role as Margo in the television series Day Break and guest appearances on shows such as Ghost Whisperer and CSI: Crime Scene Investigation. Her last film role was in Just like a Woman, released in 2012. Soomekh subsequently pursued a real estate career focusing on upscale housing.

== Personal life ==
Bahar married Clayton Frech in 2001. The couple have three children. One of their children, Ezra Frech, was born without most of his left leg (missing a knee and fibula) and missing fingers on his left hand. He was a double gold medalist at the 2024 Summer Paralympics and was named as a finalist for the 2014 Sports Illustrated SportsKid of the Year.

== Filmography ==
Year	Title	Role	Notes
2002	Without a Trace	Lemese Salman	
2002	JAG	Jasmine	Season 8, Episode 10 "The Killer"
2003	Naked Hotel	Bhurka woman	
2004	JAG	Amira Sattar	Season 9, Episode 20 "Fighting Words"
2004	Intermission	Hair Wearer	
2004	Crash	Dorri	
2004	A Lousy Ten Grand	Najah	
2005	24	Habib Marwan's Wife	(deleted scenes)
2005	Bones	Sahar Masruk	
2005	Syriana	Yassi	(Director's Uncut Version)
2006	In Justice	Neena Oponi	
2006	Mission: Impossible III	Davian's Translator	
2006	The Unit	Firefly	Season 2, Episode 1 "Change of Station"
2006	Day Break	Margo	(2006–2007)
2006	Saw III	Lynn Denlon	
2008	The Oaks	Hollis	Unaired TV pilot
2008	Ghost Whisperer	Tricia	Season 4, Episode 6 "Imaginary Friends and Enemies"
2009	Lost & Found	Abigail	
2010	Miami Medical	Vanessa	Season 1, Episode 8 "An Arm and a Leg"
2011	Castle	Nazihah Alhabi	Season 3, Episode 16 "Setup"; Season 3, Episode 17 "Countdown"
2011	CSI: Crime Scene Investigation	Dr. Sylvia Sloane	Season 12, Episode 10 "Genetic Dsorder"
2012	Parenthood	Dr. Haryana	Season 4, Episode 3 "Everything Is Not Okay"
2012	Just like a Woman	Soha	
2014	Perception	Yael	Season 3, Episode 5 "Eternity"
2026	Memory of a Killer	Leah	Season 1

== See also ==
- List of Iranian actresses
