= Dust of Life (1995 film) =

1995 film by Rachid Bouchareb

- Poussières de vie
- Directed by: Rachid Bouchareb
- Written by: Duyen Anh (novel); Rachid Bouchareb; Bernard Gesbert
- Produced by: Jean Bréhat
- Starring: Daniel Guyant; Gilles Chitlaphone; Jehan Pagès; Éric Nguyen; Lina Chua; R. Shukor Kader
- Cinematography: Youcef Sahraoui
- Edited by: Hélène Ducret
- Music by: Safy Boutella
- Distributed by: Swift Distribution
- Release date: 18 January 1995
- Running time: 87 minutes
- Countries: France; Algeria; Belgium; Germany; Hong Kong
- Language: French

Dust of Life (French: Poussières de vie) is a 1995 French drama film directed by Rachid Bouchareb. It was nominated for the Academy Award for Best Foreign Language Film as an Algerian submission. The film is based on a true story, originally recounted in a novel by Duyen Anh.

== Plot ==
The film takes place after the end of Vietnam War. It tells the story of a Vietnamese boy, Son, born to a Vietnamese mother, and an African-American father who was fighting in the war but has since returned home to the USA. (The title 'Dust of Life' refers to the Vietnamese word for children of such mixed Amerasian parentage.) Son is taken away from his mother and confined to a labour camp, where life is harsh and chances of release slim. Together with some other boys from the camp, Son attempts to escape.

== Cast ==
- Daniel Guyant – Son
- Gilles Chitlaphone – Bob
- Jehan Pagès – Petit Haï
- Éric Nguyen – Un-Deux
- Leon Outtrabady – Shrimp
- Lina Chua – Son's mother
- R. Shukor Kader – Son's father

== Accolades ==
Academy Award

- 1996: Nominated, "Best Foreign Language Film"

Young Artist Award

- 1995: Won, "Outstanding Youth Actor in a Foreign Film" - Daniel Guyant & Jehan Pagès

== See also ==
- List of submissions to the 68th Academy Awards for Best Foreign Language Film
- List of Algerian submissions for the Academy Award for Best Foreign Language Film
