= Rachid Bouchareb =

French film director and producer

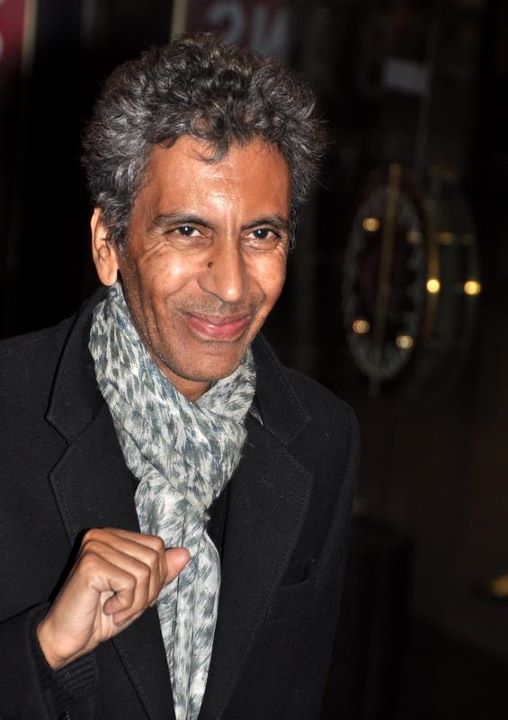
- Bouchareb in 2011
- Born: 1953 (age 72–73); Paris, France
- Occupations: Film director, producer

Rachid Bouchareb (born 1953) is a French film director and producer. He is known for his 1995 film Dust of Life, his 2006 war film Days of Glory (Indigènes) and the 2010 drama Outside the Law (Hors-la-loi), all of which were Oscar-nominated. Many of his films are based on the complex history of France and its relationship with its former colony, Algeria. His films also examine racial discrimination and conflicts in other countries, using historical dramas and contemporary settings to show his message. He also directed a trilogy of American films that examine the relationship between North America and the Arab world. He is a co-founder of the French film production company 3B Productions, with whom he continues to work as a producer. The company's US arm is Taghit.

== Early life and education ==
Rachid Bouchareb was born in 1953 in Paris, France, to Algerian parents who moved to France soon after World War II.

== Career ==
Bouchareb began his career as an assistant director for television in France's state television production company, Société française de production (SFP), from 1977 to 1984. He subsequently worked for broadcasters TF1 and Antenne 2. During this time, he also directed some short films. In 1985, he directed his first feature film, Bâton Rouge, supported by producer Humbert Balsan.

In 1988, he began a career in film production working with his associates Jean Bréhat and Jean Bigot to create the production company 3B Productions. He would go on to produce several films, including La Vie de Jésus (1997), Humanité (1999), and Flanders (2006), all of which were directed by Bruno Dumont and were honoured at the Cannes Film Festival.

Bouchareb has also directed many feature films. His feature film debut came in 1985 with Bâton Rouge. His other films have also been recognized at film festivals and won several accolades. In 1991, his film Cheb premiered at Cannes, was the official selection from Algeria for the Academy Award for Best Foreign Language Film, which was also produced by Bouchareb's 3B Productions. His other acclaimed films include Poussières de vie (Dust of Life) (which was nominated for the Academy Award for Best Foreign Language Film in 1995).

2001's Little Senegal and 2014's Two Men in Town, which both premiered at the Berlin International Film Festival. Bouchareb's biggest success is likely the 2006 war film Days of Glory (Indigènes) which was entered into the main competition for the Palme d'Or at the Cannes Film Festival, with the ensemble of actors all receiving the award for Best Actor in 2006. Bouchareb described the filming experience as "fixing an injustice". The film was nominated for an Oscar, and has been cited as helping to release the pensions of several veterans from former French colonies after being frozen for years.

In February 2009, his film London River premiered at the 2009 Berlin Film Festival, with the film's main actor Sotigui Kouyaté receiving the Silver Bear for Best Actor.

In addition to being a director and producer, Bouchareb is also a screenwriter, having written the screenplays for all his feature films. His screenplay for Days of Glory notably earned him the César Award for Best Original Screenplay.

In 2010, his film Outside the Law (Hors-la-loi) competed for the Palme d'or at the 2010 Cannes Film Festival in May. It was the official Algerian entry for the 83rd Academy Awards, and it was one of the five final nominees.

In 2012, he released the first part of his American trilogy, Just Like a Woman, starring Sienna Miller and Golshifteh Farahani. Two years later, the second part of his trilogy was released, Two Men in Town. The final part of Bouchareb's trilogy was released in 2018, entitled Belleville Cop.

In 2016, he directed the television film Road to Istanbul, starring Astrid Whetnall. Most recently in 2020, Bouchareb gave a masterclass to 17 filmmakers from the Global South in the Institut Français' La Fabrique Cinéma, an event designed for first-time filmmakers.

In 2022, he wrote, directed, and produced Nos frangins (Our Brothers). The film premiered at Cannes in May, and theatrically released in December 2022. The film is about the death of two young men in France in the 1980s at the hands of police, referencing the killing of Malik Oussekine in 1986. The film, which stars Reda Kateb, Lyna Khoudri, Raphaël Personnaz, and Samir Guesmi, was selected as the official Algerian entry to the Oscars.

== Other activities ==
Bouchareb is also a member of the board of directors of the film school La Fémis.

As of 2026, 3B Productions continues under the management of producer Muriel Merlin, with Rachid and Bilal Bouchareb as producers. In 2025 the company produced The Ice Tower (La Tour de Glace), Boomerang Atomic, and Once Upon a Time in Gaza. The US arm of the company is Taghit.

== Recognition and awards ==
In 1991, Bouchareb's film Cheb received the Georges Delerue Award for Best Soundtrack/Sound Design at Film Fest Gent.

In 2006, Bouchareb received the Henri Jeanson Prize from the Society of Dramatic Authors and Composers (SACD) for his body of work.

In May 2008, he was named a Knight of the Legion of Honour, the highest French order of merit.

In October 2014, Bouchareb received a career achievement award at the Abu Dhabi Film Festival.

== Filmography ==
=== Feature films ===
Year	English title	Original title	Notes
1985	Bâton rouge		
1991	Cheb	شاب	
1995	Dust of Life	Poussières de vie	Nominated - Academy Award for Best International Film
2001	Little Senegal		
2006	Days of Glory	Indigènes	Nominated - Academy Award for Best International Film
2009	London River		
2010	Outside the Law	Hors-la-loi	Nominated - Academy Award for Best International Film
2012	Just like a Woman		
2014	Two Men in Town		
2016	Road to Istanbul	La Route d'Istanbul	
2018	Belleville Cop	Le Flic de Belleville	
2022	Our Brothers	Nos frangins	
2025	Boomerang Atomic	Boomerang Atomique	

=== Short films ===
- La Pièce (1976)
- La Chute (1977)
- Le Banc (1978)
- Peut-être la mer (1983)
- Le vilain petit poussin (2004)
- L'ami y'a bon (2005)
- Djebel (2007)

=== TV films ===
- Des années déchirées (1993)
- L'honneur de ma famille (1997)

=== As actor ===
- 2022: Our Ties
