= Astrid Whettnall =

Belgian stage and film actress (born 1971)

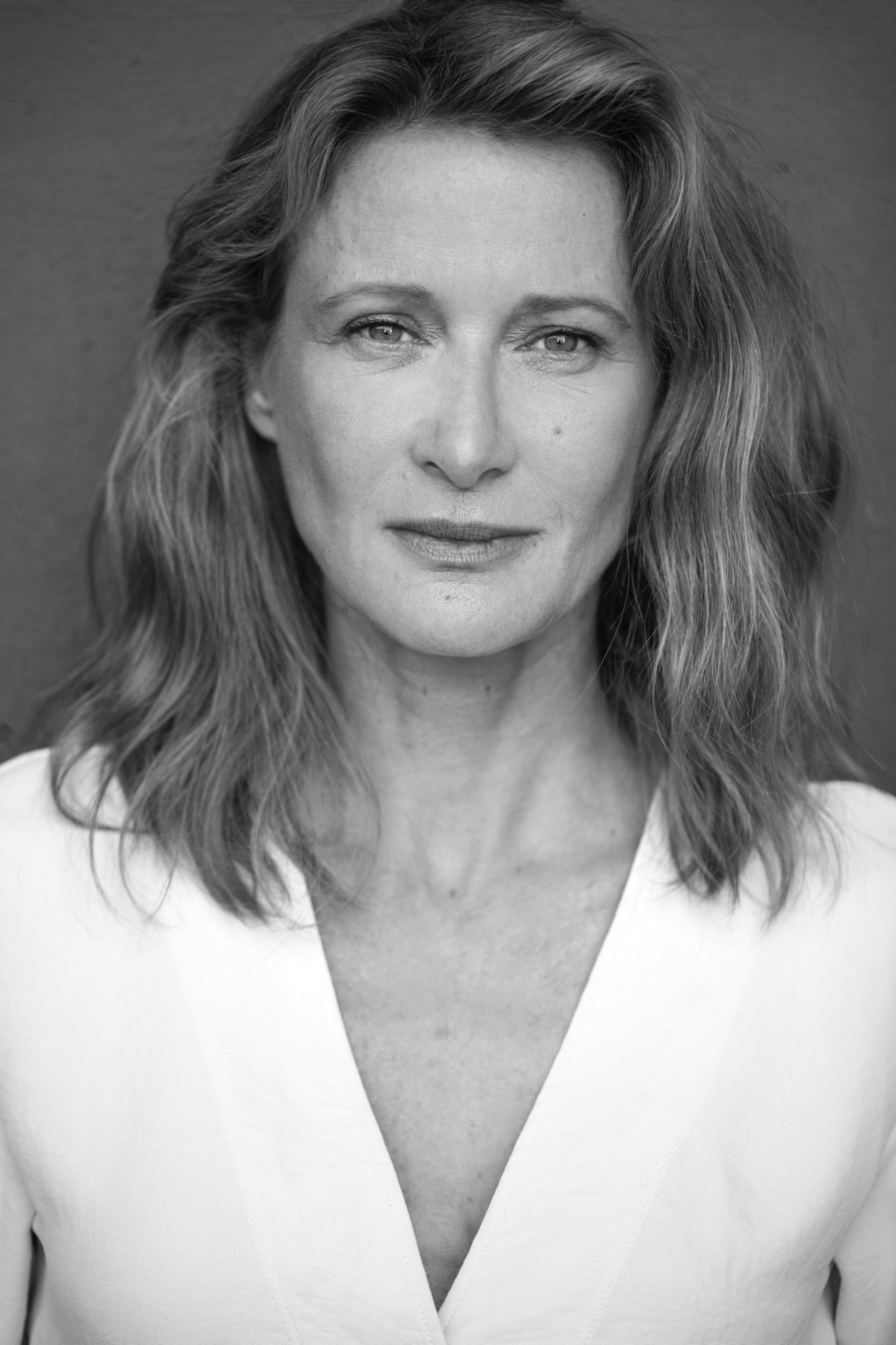
- Whettnall in 2023
- Born: 17 March 1971 (age 55); Uccle, Belgium
- Spouse: Lionel Jadot (m. 1996)

Astrid Whettnall (born 17 March 1971) is a Belgian stage and film actress. She studied at the Kleine Academy in Brussels and began working in theatre. Her film credits include Capital (2012), In the Name of the Son (2012), Salaud, on t'aime (2014), Yves Saint Laurent (2014), Marguerite (2015), and Close Enemies (2018).

She received the Magritte Award for Best Actress for her work in Road to Istanbul (2016).

== Selected filmography ==
Year	Title	Role	Notes
2012	Another Woman's Life	Simono	
2012	Capital	Marilyne Gauthier	
2012	In the Name of the Son	Elisabeth	Nominated—Magritte Award for Best Actress
2013	Les Déferlantes – [fr]	Allison	
2014	Salaud, on t'aime	Astrid	
2014	Yves Saint Laurent	Yvonne De Peyerimhoff	
2014	Crossing Lines	Madame Blanc	TV series
2014	The Missing	Sylvie Deloix	TV series
2015	Graziella	Woman	
2015	All Cats Are Grey		
2015	Marguerite	Françoise Bellaire	
2016	Baron Noir	Véronique Bosso	TV series
2016	Road to Istanbul	Elisabeth	Magritte Award for Best Actress
2018	Close Enemies	Chief of narcotics	
2019	The Mystery of Henri Pick	Inès de Crécy	
2020	Into the Night	Gabrielle Renoir	TV series
2020	My Best Part		
2023	De Grâce	Laurence Leprieur	TV series
2023	Ganglands	Commissioner Herman	Netflix series
2023	Through the Night (Quitter la nuit)	The judge	
2024	The Wages of Fear	Anne Marchand	
2024	Winter Palace	Frau Roth	Netflix series
2025	La rebelle: Les aventures de la jeune George Sand	Sophie Dupin	TV series
2025	Once Upon My Mother	Miss Corbeau	
2025	Champagne Problems	Brigitte Laurent	
2025	Prisoner 951	Monique Villa	Television mini-series
