= Mohamed Ifticene =

Algerian filmmaker (born 1943)

- Born: Mohamed Ifticene; 1943 (age 82–83); Algiers, Algeria
- Citizenship: Algeria
- Occupations: Director, screenwriter, writer
- Notable work: Djalti Les rameaux de feu (see filmography)

Mohamed Ifticene (born 1943 in Algiers) is an Algerian film director, screenwriter, writer, and documentary filmmaker. He is considered one of the independent Algerian filmmakers active from the 1960s and 1970s.

== Biography ==
Mohamed Ifticene was born in 1943 in Algiers. He studied film in Łódź, Poland, where he graduated in 1966 His graduation short film was titled Zefef.

Upon returning to Algeria, he joined the RTA (Algerian Radio and Television) and directed several short films: L’Institut agronomique (1968), Le metteur en scène (1969), Histoire d’un grand peuple (1969), La souris (1969), La plus grande richesse (1974), and Les fusils de la mère Carrar (1975).

He has also published novels, including Une saga algéroise – Sur le fil du rasoir and Une saga algéroise – Les ténèbres sanglantes.

== Filmography ==
Filmography of Mohamed Ifticene
Year	Title	Notes / Brief description
1966	Zefef	Graduation short film in Łódź
1968	L’Institut agronomique	Short film (RTA)
1969	La souris	film
1969	Le metteur en scène	Short film
1969	Histoire d’un grand peuple	Short film
1971	Gorine	Short film
1974	La plus grande richesse	Work for RTA
1975	Les fusils de la mère Carrar	Work for RTA
1976	Marchand de rêves	TV movie
1980	El Djalti (The Left-Handed)	Fiction for RTA, depicts the wandering of a teenager
1981	Le grain dans la meule	Feature-length fiction film
1983	Les rameaux de feu	Fiction work

== Literary publications ==
- Une saga algéroise – Sur le fil du rasoir (first novel) ISBN 9789931572855
- Une saga algéroise – Les ténèbres sanglantes (sequel)

== See also ==
- Djalti
- Algerian cinema
- List of Algerian films
