= Two Men in Town (2014 film) =

- Directed by: Rachid Bouchareb
- Written by: Olivier Lorelle; Rachid Bouchareb; Yasmina Khadra
- Produced by: Allen Bain; Jean Bréhat; Jérôme Seydoux; Rachid Bouchareb
- Starring: Forest Whitaker; Harvey Keitel; Ellen Burstyn; Luis Guzmán; Brenda Blethyn
- Cinematography: Yves Cape
- Music by: Éric Neveux
- Production companies: Artists & Co; Tessalit Productions
- Distributed by: Cohen Media Group
- Release date: February 7, 2014 (Berlin)
- Running time: 120 minutes
- Countries: France; United States
- Language: English

Two Men in Town is a 2014 French-American drama film directed by Rachid Bouchareb and co-written with Olivier Lorelle and Yasmina Khadra. The film stars Forest Whitaker, Harvey Keitel, Ellen Burstyn, Luis Guzmán and Brenda Blethyn. The film is a remake of the José Giovanni film Deux hommes dans la ville.

The film had its premiere in the competition section of the 64th Berlin International Film Festival. It was released in the United States by Cohen Media Group to theaters and iTunes on March 6, 2015.

== Plot ==
Long-time parole agent Emily Smith, newly arrived in Luna County, New Mexico, is assigned new parolee William Garnett, a career criminal just out of prison. Long-time county sheriff Bill Agati is unhappy about having the felon back on the streets, particularly because Garnett killed a deputy of his almost two decades ago. Garnett struggles to re-adjust to being outside, and just wants to lead a simple life now.

He has to deal with harassment from Agati and avoid his former criminal associate, Terence Saldano, who is still trafficking illegal immigrants and relentless to see Garnett return to his old ways. Garnett's earlier conversion to Islam and meeting Teresa Flores, a reserved bank employee whom he develops a relationship with, helps him resist falling back into the bad life, and agent Smith tries to help him along.

But Saldano shows up at Flores' home one late afternoon, and intimidates his way in to persuade her to influence Garnett, and when she tells him to leave, he violently assaults her. Garnett comes home that evening to discover this and he then tracks down Saldano to exact revenge.

== Cast ==
- Forest Whitaker as William Garnett
- Harvey Keitel as Bill Agati
- Ellen Burstyn as Garnett's mother
- Luis Guzmán as Terence Saldano
- Brenda Blethyn as Emily Smith
- Dolores Heredia as Teresa Flores
- Tim Guinee as Rod
- Sarah Minnich as Reporter
- Matthew Page as Prison Guard
- Lionel Archuleta as Cafe Patron
- Chris Ranney as Parolee
- Cesar Miramontes as Attorney
- Stan Carp as Richard Wayne
- Patrick Juarez as Parole Security Officer
- Michael Stone as Sheriff Deputy
- Kristin Hansen as Maria Perez
- Earl Ortiz as Dancer and Bar Patron
- Joe Cabezuela as Lieutenant Joe Corrales

== Production ==
=== Filming ===
The shooting of the film began in April 2013 in Albuquerque and Deming, New Mexico.
