= London River =

- Theatrical poster
- Directed by: Rachid Bouchareb
- Written by: Olivier Lorelle; Rachid Bouchareb
- Produced by: Rachid Bouchareb; Jean Bréhat; Bertrand Faivre; Matthieu de Braconier
- Starring: Brenda Blethyn; Sotigui Kouyaté
- Cinematography: Jérôme Alméras
- Edited by: Yannick Kergoat
- Music by: Armand Amar
- Release dates: 10 February 2009 (Berlinale); 9 July 2010 (United Kingdom)
- Running time: 87 minutes
- Country: United Kingdom
- Languages: English; French

London River is a 2009 British drama film, directed, co-written and co-produced by Franco-Algerian film director Rachid Bouchareb. Starring Brenda Blethyn and Sotigui Kouyaté, it centres on the journey of two people searching for their children after the 7 July 2005 London bombings.

== Plot ==
In July 2005, Falklands War widow Elisabeth Sommers, who is a Guernsey farmer, and Francophone African Muslim Ousmane are strangers who meet in London. She is searching for her daughter, and he for his son, following the London bombings. Neither is close to their missing child.

They fear that the daughter and son were killed in the bombings. They discover that they were a couple who lived together in a flat in London who planned to travel to France, but were killed by Hasib Hussain when the bus they were travelling on exploded in Tavistock Square.

It was shot in the UK and France. London locations include Harringay and Finsbury Park, in particular Blackstock Road.

== Cast ==
- Brenda Blethyn – Elisabeth Sommers
- Sotigui Kouyaté – Ousmane
- Roschdy Zem – Landlord
- Francis Magee – English Inspector
- Sami Bouajila – Imam
- Roschdy Zem – The Butcher
- Marc Baylis – Edward
- Bernard Blancan – Forestry worker

== Critical reception ==
The film premiered at the 59th Berlin International Film Festival on 10 February 2009.

The film received mixed reviews. The Evening Standard's Derek Malcolm gave the film four stars out of five, stating: "Bouchareb's portrait of London after the terrorist attacks is startlingly accurate and there's a genuine feel for all of the players. Ken Loach couldn't have done much better. This is a film no Londoner should miss: humane, stunningly acted, it will be a gross injustice if it doesn't win a prize from Tilda Swinton's Berlin jury".

Kaleem Aftab, writing in The Independent called London River the "most talked about film at the Berlin Film Festival", but argued that "it was only [Sotigui] Kouyate's performance that lifted an otherwise dull and predictable film that avoided any meaningful discussion about the effect of the terrorist attack around which the story was shaped".

Having seen the Berlin premiere, Variety's Jay Weissberg stated that the film "trumpets political correctness far more loudly than this intimate drama can stand. Though the ending proves effective, Bouchareb and his co-scripters employ simplistic stereotypes and obvious counterpoints that shouldn't need to be spelled out so literally. Still, with its heart in the right place and the majestic presence of Malian thesp Sotigui Kouyate, the pic will get a decent international run before heading to its originally skedded home on the smallscreen".

The Hollywood Reporter's Deborah Young states that "French director Rachid Bouchareb (Days of Glory) brings great sensitivity to the fictionalized tale, which goes a step beyond the obvious in its description of England's multiracial society scarred by deep-seated prejudice but capable of change. Without glossing over the tale's hard edges, the film ends on a positive note of ethnic tolerance that should make it more accessible to audiences".

== Awards ==
Sotigui Kouyaté won the Silver Bear Award for Best Actor at the 59th Berlin International Film Festival for his performance in the film. The film also won a Special Mention by the Ecumenical Jury.
