= Ahmed Zergui =

Algerian raï singer-songwriter

- Also known as: Ahmed Zargui
- Born: Hammam Ahmed; Sidi Bel Abbès, Algeria
- Genre: Raï
- Occupations: Singer, musician
- Instrument: guitar

Ahmed Zergui (El Abbassi) (Arabic: أحمد زرقي) (born 1948 in Sidi Bel Abbès, Algeria – 27 November 1983 in Tenira, Algeria) was an Algerian raï singer-songwriter.

He was a pioneer in introducing the Wah-wah pedal into raï music. In the 1970s he founded the group Les Frères Zergui consisting of Kacem Atek (rhythm guitar), Benyamna (organ), El Ârbi (drums), Bengamra (accordion). It is believed that "Les Frères Zergui" (the Zergui Brothers) was not composed of brothers but rather of a group of friends. In fact the nickname of the Zergui brothers (زرقي, indigo, blue) was chosen at the time by the editors and this among other things because of their tanned complexion.

Zergui died on 27 November 1983, in a road accident, while driving his car.

== Discography ==
- Ana Maneouiliche / Baghi Nassbek (7", Single) (Sassiphone, date unknown)
- Succès 82 - Maderti Chohra (Edition Mekkeraphone, 1982)
- Les Frères Zargui (Edition Royale / La Nouvelle Étoile, 1983)
- 1970's Algerian Proto-Rai Underground (Sublime Frequencies, 2008)

== Songs ==
- Aala Moulat El Khana
- Alache Jiti Tranji
- Ana Hak
- Andi Mhayna
- Atatni Hdiya (covered by Cheb Yazid)
- Chaba (covered by Khaled)
- Delali ha delali (covered by khaled)
- Khalti Fatima
- Maderti Chohra
- Mnine Jate
- Nacera (covered by Cheb Yazid)
