= Larbi Zekkal =

Algerian actor and comedian (1934–2010)

- Born: Larbi Zekkal; May 19, 1934; Algiers, Algeria
- Died: September 17, 2010 (aged 76); Algiers, Algeria
- Burial place: Sidi M’hamed cemetery
- Occupation: Actor
- Notable work: The Battle of Algiers

Larbi Zekkal (19 May 1934 – 17 September 2010) was an Algerian film actor and comedian.

== Personal life ==
Larbi Zekkal was born on May 19, 1934, in Algiers, Algeria. He died on September 17, 2010, in Algiers, Algeria at age 76 after falling from his balcony, and was buried in the Sidi M’hamed cemetery.

== Acting career ==
Zekkal began his acting career in the 1950s and played in many different movies, with his most notable role coming in The Battle of Algiers. He also played a role in the French movie Bâton Rouge which was directed by Rachid Bouchareb. He also had a role in Si Mohand U Mhand, l’insoumis. Zekkal's last role was in the French drama Outside the Law (Hors-La-Loi), which was released in 2010.

== Selected filmography ==
- The Battle of Algiers (1966, director: Gillo Pontecorvo)
- Chronicle of the Years of Fire (1975, director: Mohammed Lakhdar-Hamina) as Si Larbi Ben M’hidi
- Bâton Rouge (1985, director: Rachid Bouchareb) as Karim's father
- Outside the Law (2010, director: Rachid Bouchareb) as the boss
