= Rachida =

2002 film

- Directed by: Yamina Bachir
- Written by: Yamina Bachir
- Produced by: Thierry Lenouvel; Margarita Seguy
- Starring: Ibtissem Djouadi
- Cinematography: Mustafa Ben Mihoub
- Edited by: Cécile Andreotti; Yamina Bachir
- Release date: 21 May 2002
- Running time: 93 minutes
- Country: Algeria
- Languages: French; Arabic

Rachida is a 2002 Algerian drama film directed by Yamina Bachir. It was screened in the Un Certain Regard section at the 2002 Cannes Film Festival. The film was also the first 35mm full-length feature directed by an Algerian woman that was released widespread.

== Production details ==
- Title: Rachida
- Director: Yamina Bachir
- Producer: Jaco Van Dormael, Yamina Bachir
- Screenwriter: Yamina Bachir
- Cinematography: Luis Armando Arteaga
- Editing: Yamina Bachir
- Music: Robert Marcel Lepage
- Production companies: Les Films de la Source (France), INA (France), MIB Filmproduktion (Germany), Tanit Films (Algeria)
- Country of production: Algeria / France / Germany
- Original language: Arabic (Algerian dialect)
- Release year: 2002
- Runtime: 100 minutes
- Format: 35 mm, Color
- Filming location: Algiers, Algeria

== Plot ==
Rachida lives and teaches in a popular neighborhood in Algiers. Like most of her countrymen, she thinks the conflict which is bleeding out her country does not affect her, until the day she is confronted by a group of terrorists that includes a former student of hers, Sofiane. The group asks her to plant a bomb in her school. When she refuses, the terrorists shoot her in cold blood. She saves her life miraculously and takes refuge in a nearby village.

== Cast ==
- Ibtissem Djouadi - Rachida
- Bahia Rachedi - Aïcha
- Rachida Messaoui En - Zohra
- Hamid Remas - Hassen
- Zaki Boulenafed - Khaled
- Amel Choukh - La mariée
- Abdelkader Belmokadem - Mokhtar
- Azzedine Bougherra - Tahar
- Amal Ksili - Fatima
