= Karim Ziad =

Algerian drummer (born 1966)

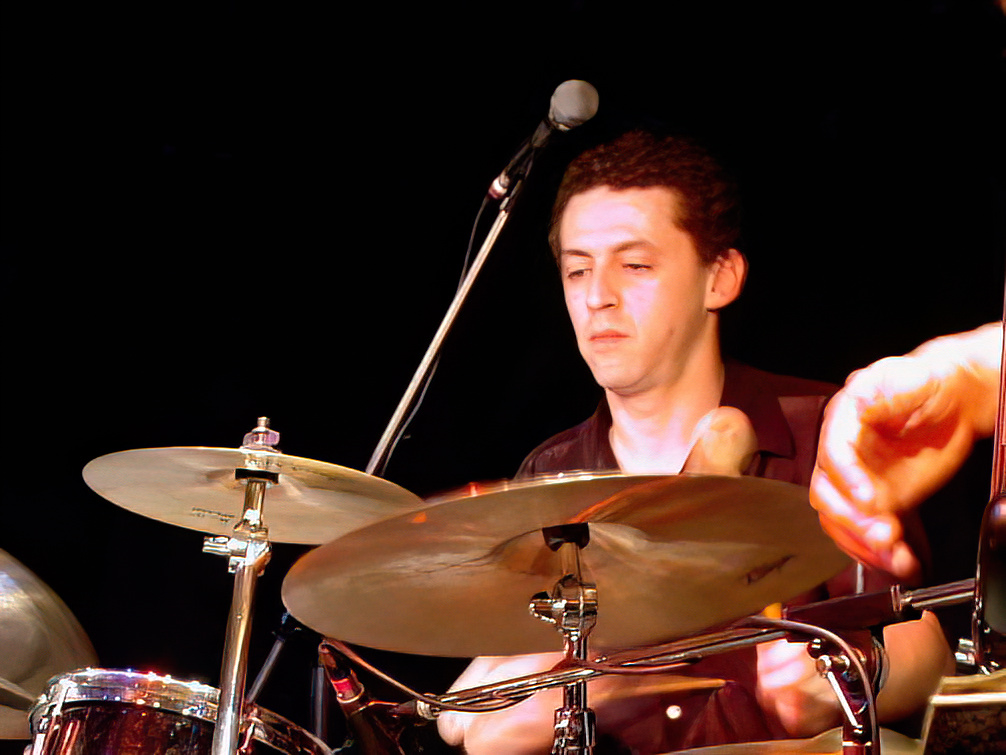
- Ziad performing in Munich in 2002
- Born: January 1, 1966 (age 60); Algiers
- Occupations: Musician; Drummer; Singer

Karim Ziad (born 1966) is an Algerian musician. A percussionist, drummer, singer and composer, he has been influenced both by other North African musicians and by jazz. Ziad was involved in a hard rock band in his youth in Algiers, before moving to Paris to study biology, where he became a jazz drummer for Cheb Mami, Khaled and Idir, among others.
