= Safy Boutella =

Algerian musician, composer, producer (b. 1950)

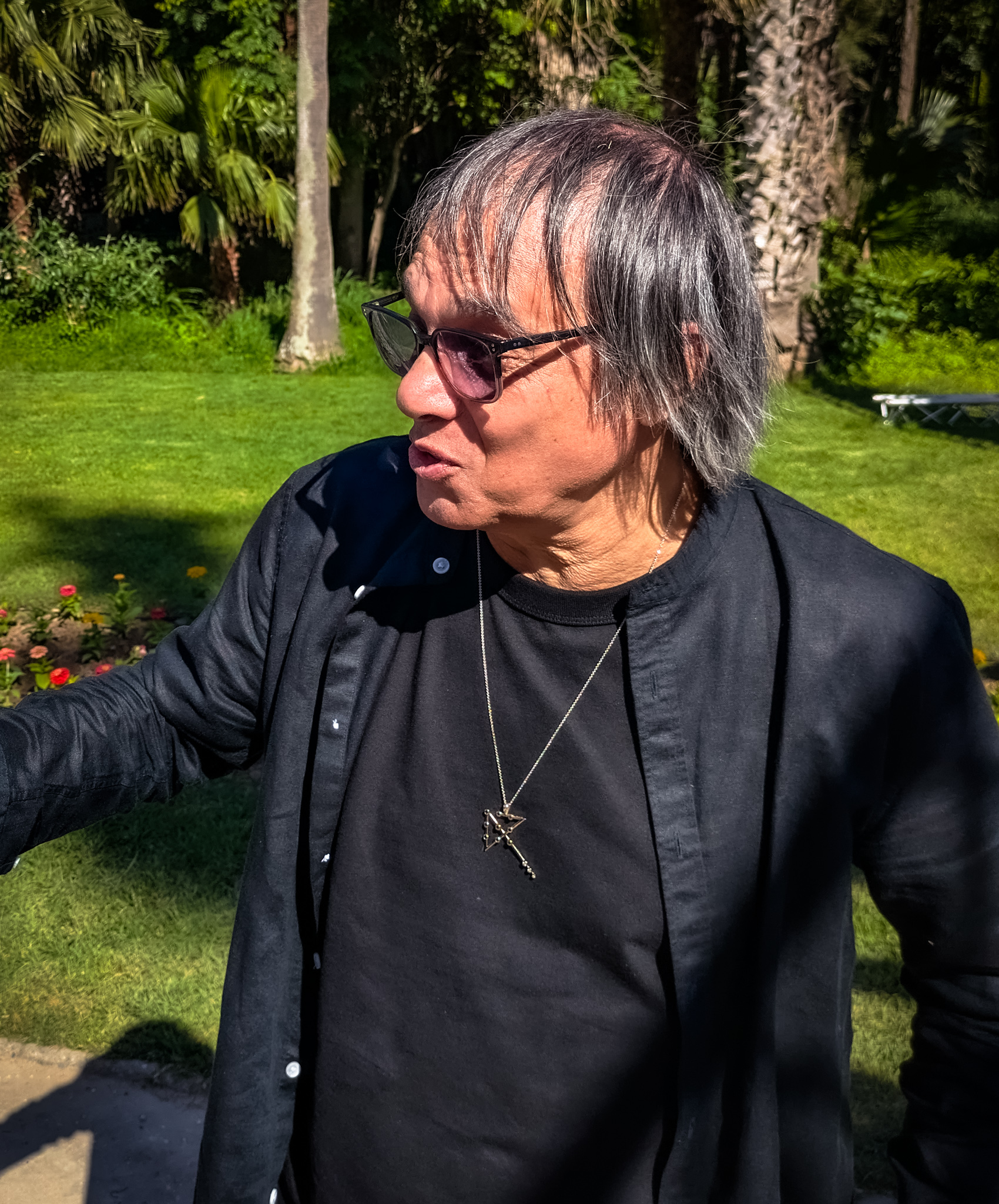
- Boutella in 2026
- Born: Safieddine Mohamed Boutella; 6 January 1950 (age 76); Pirmasens, West Germany
- Education: Berklee College of Music
- Occupations: Musician; composer; arranger; record producer; actor
- Children: 2, including Sofia Boutella
- Father: Mohamed Rabah Boutella
- Musical career
- Origin: Algeria
- Genres: Raï; jazz
- Instrument: Keyboards
- Labels: Indigo; Label Bleu

Safieddine Mohamed Boutella (Arabic: صفي الدين محمد بوتلة; born 6 January 1950) is an Algerian musician, arranger, composer, and record producer who graduated from Berklee College of Music. He is the father of dancer and actress Sofia Boutella. He is best known for creating with Khaled the album Kutché, his album Mejnoun, arranging Nass el Ghiwane, and many young artists since the nineties. He also composed for Djamel Allam Djawhara (kind of Algerian anthem), more than seventy movie soundtracks, and five musical frescoes.

== Biography ==
In 1981, back from the United States, he gave several underground concerts in Algeria, developing music based on compound rhythms and the fusion of North African, Oriental, and Western sounds. In 1986, with Cheb Khaled, he released the album Kutché, which he co-produced with Martin Meissonnier and for which wrote arrangements.

In July 2007, he celebrated thirty years of music: Orient, Khmous Alik, Kotidien...ZARBOT concerts, named after the spinning top. With more than forty musicians on stage, including twenty strings, guests testifying to his collaborations as arranger for Cheb Khaled, Djamel Allam, Abdy, opera singer Fadela Chebab, and the singer Selma Kouiret.

In 2010, he was contacted by the Festival Mawazine in Morocco to revisit the repertoire of the Moroccan group of the 1970s, Nass El Ghiwane. In 2012, he was invited by the Doha Tribeca Film Festival in Qatar to perform with his musicians at the award ceremony for films in competition.

Since the 1980s he has written more than seventy film scores, collaborating in Algerian, French, English, and Italian cinema.

He collaborated with Rachid Bouchareb on music for Little Senegal films, Poussières de vie, Cheb, and Merzak Allouache for Salut Cousin. The music of Christophe Ruggia's film The Gone of Chaâba is one of his contributions. He was the lead actor in Taïeb Louhichi's Layla, My Reason.

Boutella has composed and staged grandiose shows (some of which are the fruit of work with the Tuaregs): Rêve Bleu in 1988, La Source in 2001 before an audience of 90,000 at the Olympic Stadium in Algiers.

== Personal life ==
Safy Boutella is the son of Colonel Mohamed Rabah Boutella (1924–2007), Algerian military attaché in Paris, and the father of dancer and actress Sofia Boutella. She danced for Madonna during the Confessions Tour in 2006 and Sticky & Sweet Tour in 2008, and for Michael Jackson in 2009. She was in the films Kingsman: Secret Service (2015), Star Trek: Beyond (2016), and The Mummy (2017). He is also the father of actor Azad Boutella, who was in Informer (2018), Herrens Vege (2018), The State (2017), and Young Blood (2016).

== Discography ==
=== Studio albums ===
- Kutché (1988) - with Khaled
- Mejnoun (1992)
- Zarbot (2007)
- Taous Arhab (2018)

=== Soundtracks ===
- Automne, Octobre à Alger (1994)
- Poussières de vie (1995)
- Salut Cousin (1994)
- Room to Rent (2001)
- Little Senegal (2001)
- Le pain nu (2004)
- Fadhma N'Soumer (2014)

== Arrangements and direction ==
- Yabeit album, Amel Wahby (1988)9781843534082
- Gouraya album, Djamel Allam (2000)
- El Layali album, Nawal Zoghbi (2000)
- Galbi album, Abdy [archive] (2000)
- Nass el Ghiwane (Festival Mawazine creation) (2012)
- Coke Studio Program, arranging maghrebian musical heritage (2018)

== Filmography ==
Film-documentary concepts

- 2018 : Safy sans filtre, directed by Medhi Hachid (Contrast)
- 2017 : Pluriel's, Safy Boutella and new Algerian singers, directed by Frédéric Fiol (Allegorie)

Movie soundtrack

- 2014 Fadhma N'Soumer1. Film de Belkacem Hadjadj.
- 2013 L'Héroïne. Film de Chérif Aggoune
- 2012 Margelle. Moyen-métrage de Omar Mouldouira
- 2010 La cinquième corde [archive]. Film de Selma Bargach
- 2008 Pas si simple. Film TV de Rachida Krim
- 2008 Mostefa Benboulaïd (film) de Ahmed Rachedi
- 2007 Ayrouan. Film de Brahim Tsaki
- 2007 Il faut sauver Saïd. Film TV de Didier Grousset
- 2006 Le retour. Série TV 13 épisodes de Dahmane Ouzid
- 2005 Permis d'aimer. Film TV de Rachida Krim
- 2004 Le pain nu. Film de Rachid Benhadj
- 2004 10 millions de centimes. Film de Bachir Derraïs
- 2001 Little Senegal. Film de Rachid Bouchareb
- 2001 Room to rent. [archive] Film de Khaled El Hagar
- 2000 Histoires d’huîtres. Documentaire de Marie-Dominique Montel
- 1999 Mirka. Film de Rachid Benhadj
- 1998 Jacques Chardonne. Documentaire de Marie-Dominique Montel
- 1997 Les oranges. Pièce de théâtre de Aziz Chouaki
- 1997 Conan Doyle. Documentaire de Marie-Dominique Montel
- 1997 L’arbre des destins suspendus. Film TV de Rachid Benhadj
- 1997 Salut cousin ! Film de Merzak Allouache
- 1996 Trouble fête. Film TV de Pierre Lary
- 1996 D’amour et d’eau salée Film TV de Edwin Baily
- 1996 Lawrence d’Arabie. Documentaire de Marie-Dominique Montel
- 1996 Le Gone du Chaâba Film de Christophe Ruggia
- 1996 : Les Sœurs Hamlet d'Abdelkrim Bahloul
- 1995 Un taxi pour Aouzou. Moyen-métrage de Issa Serge Coelo
- 1995 La berlinoise. Court-métrage de Michel le Thomas
- 1995 L’instit. Film TV de Pierre Lary
- 1995 Le mouton noir. Film de Francis de Guetz
- 1995 Le paradis des infidèles. Moyen-métrage de A. Kabbouche
- 1994 La contredanse. Court-métrage de Omar Ladgham
- 1994 Poussières de vie. Film de Rachid Bouchareb
- 1993 Cheb. Film de Rachid Bouchareb
- 1993 Femmes d’Islam. Documentaire de Yamina Benguigui
- 1992 Automne, octobre à lager. Film de Malik Lakdhar-Hamina
- 1989 Histoire d’une rencontre. Film de Brahim Tsaki
- 1989 Cœur nomade. Film de Fitouri Belhiba
- 1989 La nuit de la décennie. Film de Brahim Babï
- 1984 Chambre 28. Série de 3 films de Malek Bouguermouh, Madani Merabi, Rachid Benhadj
- 1983 L’affiche. Film de Djamel Fezzaz
- 1982 Contes pour enfants Émission TV de Sadek Kebir et Cherif Mourah
- 1982 La clé épileptique. Série de 7 moyen-métrages de Rachid Benhadj, Cherif Mourah, Belkacem Hadjadj, Mustapha Lamri, Cherif Begga, Madami Merabi & Malek Bouguermouh
- 1982 La grande tentative. Film de Djamel Fezzaz
- 1982 Le Refus. Pièce du théâtre régional de Constantine
- 1981 Essilane. Série TV 11 épisodes de Ahmed Rachedi
- 1980 Le bouchon. Film de Belkacem Hadjadj
- 1980 L’attente. Série de courts-métrages de Belkacem Hadjadj
- 1980 Le chemin de fer en Algérie. Documentaire de Dahmane Ouzid
- 1980 Faits divers. Série de films de B. Boutmene et Dahmane Ouzid
- 1979 Les moineaux d’Algérie. Film de Tayeb Mefti
