= Yamina Bachir =

Algerian film director (1954–2022)

Yamina Bachir-Chouikh
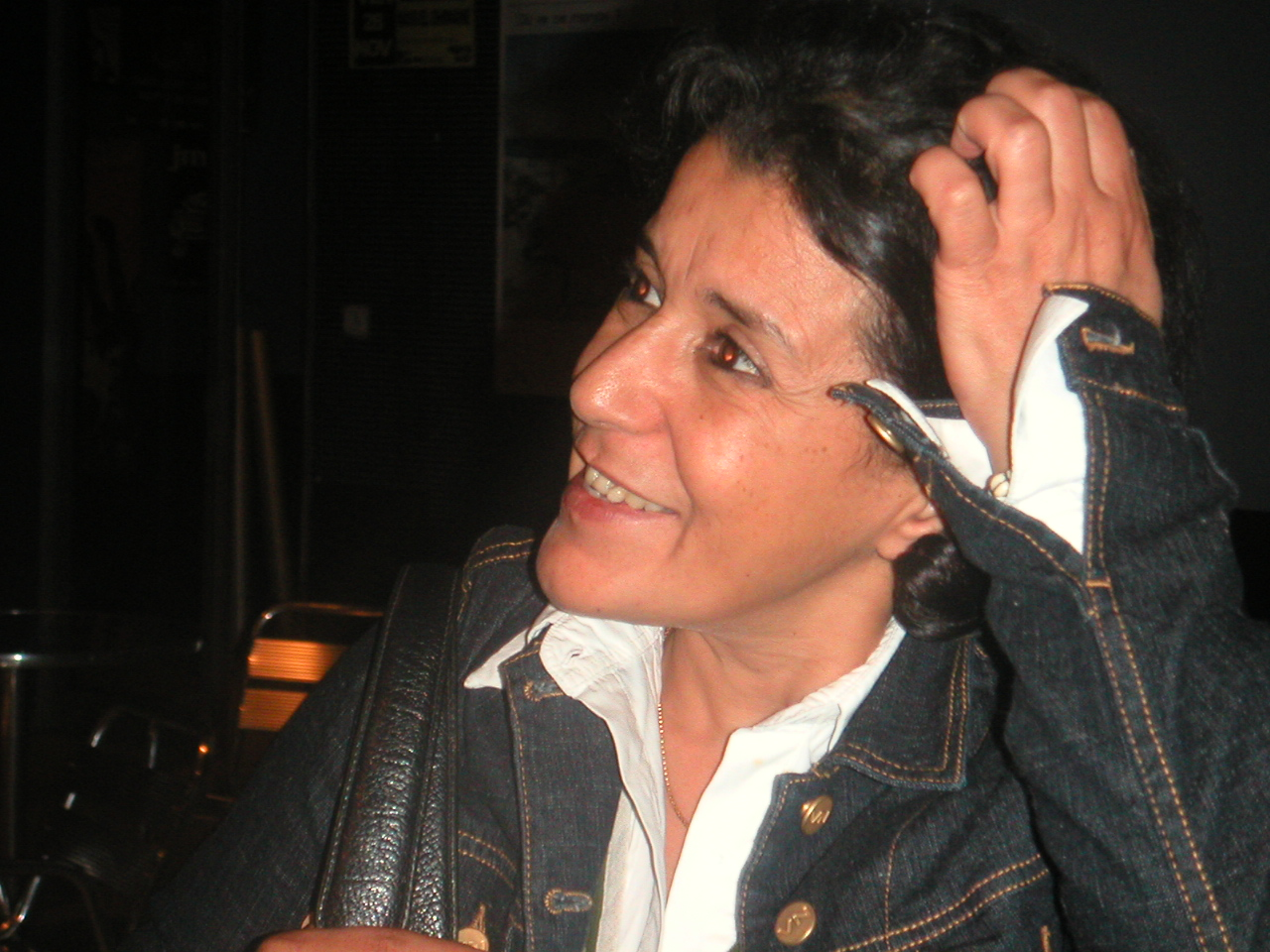
- Born: 20 March 1954; Algiers, French Algeria, France
- Died: 3 April 2022 (aged 68)
- Occupations: Film director Screenwriter
- Years active: 1982–2022

Yamina Bachir (20 March 1954 – 3 April 2022) was an Algerian film director and screenwriter. Her film Rachida was screened in the Un Certain Regard section at the 2002 Cannes Film Festival. According to Roy Armes, Rachida is 'the first 35mm feature directed by an Algerian woman in Algeria'. The film was primarily financed by French and European funding companies. It was popular in Algeria and was distributed internationally in France.

== Career and personal life ==
Bachir attended the National Film School where she studied editing. She is best known for her work Rachida which took her five years to produce. Rachida has been the only Algerian film screened for the Un Certain Regard prize.

Bachir was married to fellow Algerian director Mohammed Chouikh. She has a son and three daughters. During the Black Decade, Bachir-Chouikh stayed in Algeria where she worked as a film editor on her husband's films.

== Filmography ==
- Sandstorm (1982)
- Rachida (2002)
