= Lydia Larini =

Algerian actress

- Born: 1982 (age 43–44); Batna, Algeria
- Citizenship: Algerian
- Occupation: Actress
- Notable work: La Vie d'après Abou Leila; Mascarades; Larbi Ben M'hidi (film)

Lydia Larini Born in Batna in 1982, she joined the theatre at the age of 14, is an Algerian actress who works in film, television and theatre. She rose to fame thanks to her varied roles in Algerian productions ranging from historical films and contemporary dramas to popular television series. In cinema, she has collaborated with several renowned Algerian directors. She also appears in numerous popular television series and takes part in a sustained theatre production, where she plays roles in both classical and contemporary plays.

== Filmography ==
=== Cinema ===
Year	Title	Director / Notes	Reference
2008	Mostefa Ben Boulaïd	Ahmed Rachedi	
2008	Mascarades	Lyes Salem	
2019	Abou Leila	Amin Sidi-Boumédiène (produced 2019, released in France 2020)	
2021	La Vie d'après	Anis Djaad (role: Hadjer)	
2023	Execution (short film)	Youcef Mahssas	
2025	Larbi Ben M'hidi	Bachir Derrais (premieres in 2024, release in 2025)	
2025	Zighoud Youcef	—	

== Television ==
Title	Notes	Reference
Mashaer	Television series	
Jouha	Television series	
Le Tatouage	Television series	
Win El Harba Win	Television series	
Douar El Chaouia	Television series	
Et Nous	Television series	
Révolution	Television series	
La Vie Continue	Television series	
Hessab Wanassab	Television series	
La Mère du Martyre	Television series	
El Khawa (season 2)	Television series	
Yemma	Television series	

== Theatre ==
Play	Notes	Reference
Le Talon d'Argent	Stage play	
Mariée de la Pluie	Stage play	
Le Rendez-vous	Stage play	
L'Empereur	Stage play	
Jugurtha	Stage play	
Désordre des Portes	Stage play	
Juge de l'Ombre	Stage play	
Devant le Mur de Ville	Stage play	
Tête de Fil	Stage play	
L'Année de Corde	Stage play	
Les Martyrs reviennent cette semaine	Stage play	
El Djamilat	Stage play	
Noce de Sang	Stage play	
Silhouette d'Ombre	Stage play	

== See also ==
- Cinema of Algeria
- List of Algerian films
- Theatre of Algeria
- La Vie d'après
