= Mohammed Haddad =

Bahraini composer and music critic (born 1975)

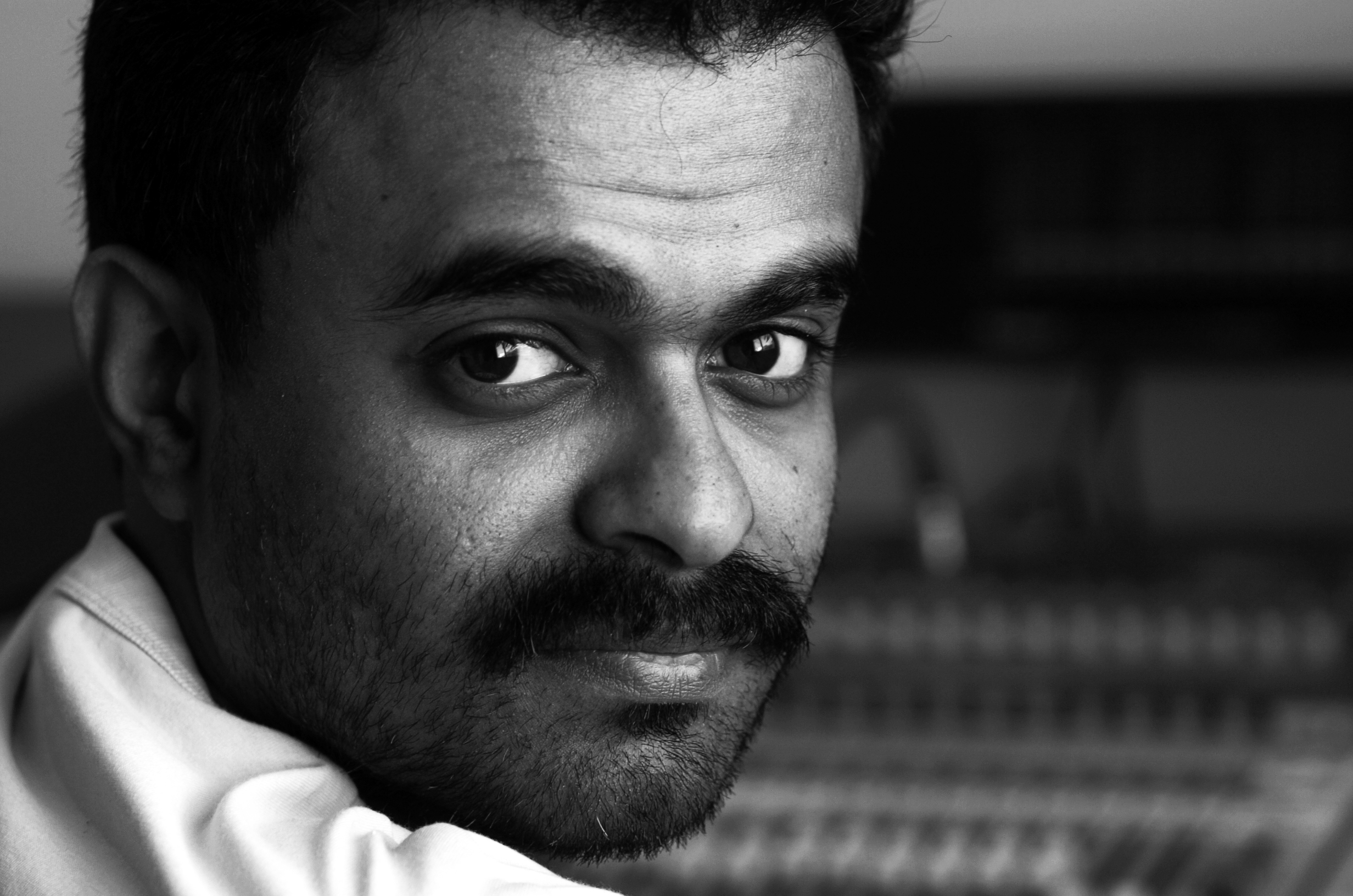
- Mohammed Haddad in his home studio by the photographer: Ali Mohammed

Background information
- Born: Mohamed Jasim Al Haddad; 2 October 1975 (age 50)
- Origin: Muharraq, Kingdom of Bahrain
- Genres: Contemporary World, Soundtrack, Theatrical, Instrumental
- Instruments: Oud, Piano, Keyboards
- Years active: 1995 - present
- Website: www.mohammedhaddad.com

Mohammed Haddad (Arabic: محمد حداد) (born 2 October 1975) is a Bahraini composer and music critic. He is an active artist in the music scene of Bahrain and a leading composer in the film scores of Bahraini films. He is best known for his work on the soundtrack of the critically acclaimed Bahraini motion picture A Bahraini Tale.

== Early life and family ==
Mohammed Haddad was born on October 2, 1975, in Muharraq, Bahrain, the second child of father Qassim Haddad and Mother Moza Al Shamlan, along with his elder sister Tufool Haddad and younger brother Mahyar Haddad. His father poet Qassim Haddad is an influential cultural figure in Bahrain.

In 1982, when Haddad was seven years old, he told his parents that he wanted to study music and become a musician. Picked up the Keyboard at the age of 8 and quickly became the leading musician in his primary school's music band. When he moved to his intermediate school at the age of 12, he picked up the Oud and made it his major instrument until he flew to Cairo to pursue a degree in music, where he studied music composition and conducting at the Cairo Conservatory of Music, focusing on the Piano.

Upon his return to Bahrain from Cairo in 2001, he secured a position as the music specialist and the head of the Music club at the University of Bahrain.

In 2005, he married the architect Maysam Al Nasser.

== Education ==
In 2000, Haddad had obtained his bachelor's degree in Music composition and conducting with an honors with distinction degree from the Cairo Conservatory of Music, Academy of Art, Egypt.

Between those seven years 1993 - 2000, Haddad studied score-reading, orchestration and conducting under maestro Ahmed El-Saedi, counterpoint and music analysis under professor Awatef Abdel Karim and composition basics under Ahmad Abdulla, Mona Ghoneim and Rageh Dawood.

In 1997, while Haddad was enrolled in his bachelor program in Cairo, he also participated in Bahrain in a musical workshop for Oud under the supervision of the Iraqi musician Naseer Shamma.

== Achievements ==
Upon his return from his educational journey in Cairo, Haddad was immediately involved in the art scene in Bahrain. In 2000, he composed the music for the play “Three Girls…Harem” right after his graduation. And continued composing the music and sound effects for a number of plays afterward including, “Wedding Night” in 2001, “Adhari” and “Life Is Not Very Serious in Its Bits and Pieces” in 2003, “At Midnight” in 2004 and “News of the Mad Lover” in 2005.

Also, in 2005, while he was in a visit to Scotland, he composed music for the experimental animation “Emotion in Motion”- project by Hiba Aboulhosn, Edinburgh College of Art.

By the year 2006, Haddad had established himself as one of Bahrain's rising music composers, the same year he was assigned by Bahraini film director Bassam Al-Thawadi to compose the score of the Bahrain motion picture A Bahraini Tale. The movie received excellent reviews all around the Persian Gulf region.

2008 was a productive year for Haddad, he composed the score for six independent films, “Future Vision”, a documentary directed by Bassam Al-Thawadi, then “A Dinner” directed by Hussain Al-Riffaei, “Absence” directed by Mohammed Bu-Ali, “Yaseen” directed by Jamal Al-Ghailan, then he worked with Emirati director Khalid Al-Mahmood in his short film “Bint al nokhitha”, and his last film in 2008 was “Mraimy” a short film directed by Ali Al-Ali.

Haddad collaborated in two projects with his father, the poet Qassim Haddad, and his photographer sister, Tufool Haddad, “Tarafa” and “Vincent”, each of which resulted in a music CD, a book of poetry and narrative, and an album of art photos. He has also collaborated with a large group of musicians in Bahrain as a music arranger and oud player. One of the most important musicians with whom he worked continuously is Ala Ghawas, where he participated in a number of his albums as a string arranger, pianist and oud player.

Mohammed Haddad had also been writing critical publications about music in several Bahraini newspapers since 1995 until today. He presented a wide range of music workshops and panel discussions in many festivals, including the Spring of Culture Festival in Bahrain, the Gulf Film Festival in the UAE, and the Saudi Film Festival.

== Works ==
=== Albums ===
- 2016 – Vincent
- 2011 – Tarafa
- 2006 – A Bahraini Tale

=== Film scores ===
- 2014 – The Sleeping Tree (directed by Mohammed Rashed Buali)
- 2010 – The Last Days of Yousif (directed by Mohammed Janahi)
- 2006 – A Bahraini Tale (directed by Bassam Al-Thawadi)

=== Short films ===
- 2019 – Sama (directed by Ammar Zainal)
- 2019 – Curtain (directed by Mohamed Alsalman)
- 2019 – Attempt (directed by Yacob Almarzoog)
- 2018 – An Angel Leave (directed by Mousa Althunyan)
- 2017 – Tongue (directed by Mohamed Alsalman)
- 2016 – The Rooster (directed by Salman Yousef)
- 2015 – Ikare (directed by Anish Babu Verghese)
- 2015 – There will be light (directed by Salman Yousif)
- 2014 – Woman Remains (directed by Hassan Eskafi)
- 2014 – Central Market (directed by Saleh Nass)
- 2013 – Grievance (directed by Emad Ali Abbas)
- 2012 – One-Way (directed by Hassan Eskafi)
- 2012 – Huna London (directed by Mohammed Bu-Ali)
- 2009 – The Cage (directed by Hussain Al-Riffaei)
- 2009 – Burning flowers (directed by Mohammed Ibrahim)
- 2009 – The Good Omen (directed by Mohammed Bu-Ali)
- 2008 – Mraimy (directed by Ali Al-Ali)
- 2008 – Bint al nokhitha (directed by Khalid Al-Mahmood)
- 2008 – Yassin (directed by Jamal Al-Ghailan)
- 2008 – Absence (directed by Mohammed Bu-Ali)
- 2008 – A Dinner (directed by Hussain Al-Riffaei)

=== Documentary films ===
- 2017 – Sharp Tools (directed by Nujoom AlGhanem)
- 2013 – Honey, Rain & Dust (directed by Nujoom AlGhanem)
- 2008 – Red, Blue & Yellow (directed by Nujoom AlGhanem)
- 2008 – Future Vision (directed by Bassam Al-Thawadi)
- 1999 – Between two Banks (directed by Nujoom AlGhanem)

=== Animation ===
- 2011 – The Waterfront Promenade (produced by Durrat Al Bahrain)
- 2010 – The Smart City (produced by COWI A/S)
- 2005 – Emotion in Motion (created by Hiba Aboulhosn)

=== Theatrical music ===
- 2019 – Tune of the statues (directed by Taher Mohsen, Awal Theatre)
- 2018 – The Barrier (directed by Ibrahim Khalfan, Sawari Theatre)
- 2010 – The first page of the newspaper (directed by Abdulla Al-Sa'dawi, Sawari Theatre)
- 2005 – News of the Mad Lover (directed by Khalid Al-Rowaie, Awal Theatre)
- 2004 – At Midnight (directed by Abdulla Al-Sa'dawi, Sawari Theatre)
- 2003 – Life Is Not Very Serious in Its Bits and Pieces (directed by Abdulla Al-Sa'dawi, Sawari Theatre)
- 2003 – Adhari (directed by Juma'an Al-Rowaie, Awal Theatre)
- 2001 – Wedding Night (directed by Abdulla Swayid, Al-Jazeera Theatre)
- 2000 – Three Girls…Harem (directed by Khalid Al-Rowaie, Sawari Theatre)
- 1997 – Basements (directed by Jamal Al-Saqer)
- 1995 – Last Soup (directed by Yousef Al-Hamdan, Sawari Theatre)

== Participations ==
- Nov 2013 - Armor - Bahrain

(Strings arrangement for the song “Ashes” by the Bahraini artist Ala Ghawas, performed by Studio Pros Strings) - Los Angeles, USA.

- Sep 2013 - Qassim Haddad... Almost - Bahrain

(Arranged music for two Ouds for a song by Hassan Haddad) - Ministry of Culture.

- Jul 2012 - The Bahraini - Bahrain

(Musically arranged the chant “The Bahraini” by Al Walla Band).

- Apr 2012 - Watan - Bahrain

(Participated as a composer and piano player, with a group of musicians, in the concert “Watan”) - Al Riwaq Art Space.

- Oct 2007 - Algeria... Arab Capital of Culture 2007 - Algeria

(Participated with original Pieces composed for piano in The Cultural Bahraini Week as part of “Algeria... Arab Capital of Culture 2007”), Palais de la Culture.

- Mar 2007 - 10th International Universities Art Convention - Egypt

(Participated in the 10th International Universities Art Convention, in South Valley University) - Hurghada.

- Nov 2006 - Magic Flute, but not only... - France

(Participated with the UNESCO's traditional orchestra Playing the Oud, in a musical Concert entitled Magic Flute, but not only...(Part III of Mozart, but not only ...), on the occasion of Closure of UNESCO's 60th anniversary celebration, UNESCO) - Paris.

- Nov 2005 - The Cultural Bahraini Days - United Arab Emirates

(Participated in The Cultural Bahraini Days with original Pieces composed for piano) - Abu Dhabi.

- Jul 2003 - Ziryab - Bahrain

(Participated as a composer and piano player, with a group of musicians, in the concert “Ziryab”) - Isa Town Sport and cultural Club.

- Oct 2003 - Bahrain's 12th International Music Festival - Bahrain

(Participated in Bahrain's 12th International Music Festival, by composing Forlorn Apse, a piece for piano and cello, performed by members of Bahrain's Music Band, The Directorate of Culture and National Heritage of the Ministry of Information) - Bahrain National Museum.

- Oct 2002 - (Ja'salam) Cultural Festival - Switzerland

(Participated in (Ja'salam) Cultural Festival, Invited by the festival organizer Sandro Lunin, the director of Schlachthaus in Bern, music for the play “Three Girls…Harem”) - Bern.

- Oct 2002 - Arabic Child’s Song Festival - Jordon

(Participated in the Arabic Child's Song Festival, music and arrangement for the song “Challenge”) - Amman.

- Oct 2002 - Bahrain's 11th International Music Festival - Bahrain

(Participated in Bahrain's 11th International Music Festival, composing A Dance, followed by a little Death, a piece for Orchestra, performed by The European Union Chamber Orchestra, Conducted by Gernot Süssmuth, The Directorate of Culture and National Heritage of the Ministry of Information) - Bahrain National Museum.

- Jul 2002 - 5th International University Theatre Arts Festival - Lebanon

(Participated in the 5th International University Theatre Arts Festival, with music composition and arrangement for the original songs Voyaging Amulet, Land of prophets and Piano Nocturne Friend of the moon, Lebanese American University [LAU]) - Beirut.

- Oct 2001 - For her - Bahrain

(Participated as a composer and piano player, with a group of musicians, in a concert entitled “For her”, dedicated to Al Aqsa Second Intifada) - Gulf air Club.

- Jun 2001 - International Day in Support of Torture Victims - Bahrain

(Participated in the United Nations International Day in Support of Torture Victims, playing the Oud, accompanied by the poem “Martyr” of Qassim Haddad) - Al Oroba Club.

- Oct 2000 - Bahrain's 9th International Music Festival - Bahrain

(Participated in Bahrain's 9th International Music Festival, as a soloist accompanied by Bahrain's Music Band) - The Directorate of Culture and National Heritage of the Ministry of Information.

- Jul 1999 - Three Musicians Concert - Bahrain

(Participated as a composer and piano player in “Three Musicians Concert”, Art Centre) - The Directorate of Culture and National Heritage of the Ministry of Information.

- Sep 1997 - Overseas music students - Bahrain

(participated as a composer, Oud and piano player, in a concert for overseas music students, Art center) - The Directorate of Culture and National Heritage of the Ministry of Information

- Oct 1996 - Bahrain's 5th International Music Festival - Bahrain

(Participated in Bahrain's 5th International Music Festival. played the Arabic lute in a duet with the English lute player Bill Badley) - The Directorate of Culture and National Heritage of the Ministry of Information.

== Collaborations ==
- 2016 - "Van Gogh's journals" - Bahrain

(Worked with the poet Qassim Haddad and photographer Tufool Haddad on an art project that translates the painter Vincent van Gogh's life to musical, visual and poetic visions) Al Riwaq Art Space.

- 2011 - "Tarafa ibn Alwardah" - Bahrain

(Worked with the poet Qassim Haddad and photographer Tufool Haddad on an art project that translates the poet Tarafa Ibn Al Abd's life to musical visual and poetic visions) Al Riwaq Art Space.

- 2010 - "The Sea has a rhythm" - Bahrain

(Piano accompanist to the Poet Qassim Haddad in a poetry musical recital) - Bahrain Graduates club.

- 2009 - Washaej with poet Ali Abdulla Khalifa - Bahrain.

(Collaborated with the Bahraini poet Ali Abdulla Khalifa in the poetry recital Washaej, by composing the melody for some of his poems) - Isa cultural center.

- 2008 – The Sorceress Woke Me Up with the Bahraini poet Qassim Haddad - Germany.

(Played the piano as an accompanist to the poet Qassim Haddad in a poetry recital, “The Sorceress Woke Me Up”, west-östlicher diwan e.V. and supported by the German Academic Exchange Service DAAD) - Berlin.

- 2007 - Doha 6th Cultural Festival with the Emarati poet Maisoon Saqr Al-Qasimi - Qatar.

(Performed a poetic musical concert with the Emirate poet Maisoon Saqr Al-Qasimi in Doha 6th Cultural Festival) - Doha.

- 2007 - As One Heart with the Bahraini poet Ali Abdulla Khalifa - Bahrain.

(Composing music in the CD including recited poems that accompanied the poetry book of poems in vernacular Arabic “As One Heart”) - Al-Ayam for Publishing and Distributing.

- 2006 - Poetry recital with the German poet Ilija Trojanow - Bahrain.

(Played the piano as an accompanist to the German poet Ilija Trojanow in a poetry recital, Foreign Languages Department) - University of Bahrain.

- 2006 - Bahrain: Rétrovision with the Bahraini photographer Deyana Ahmadi - Bahrain.

(Collaborated in the Photography exhibition “Bahrain: Rétrovision” with Oud improvisations, photography by Deyana Ahmadi, Institut du Monde Arabe, Paris) - France.

- 2005 - The Sorceress Woke Me Up with the Bahraini poet Qassim Haddad - Bahrain.

(Played the piano as an accompanist to the poet Qassim Haddad in a poetry recital, “The Sorceress Woke Me Up” - Abdulla Al Zayed house for Bahrain Press Heritage) – Muharraq.

- 2005 - Suwalef Dunya with singer Khaled El Sheikh - Bahrain.

(Musically arranged the songs composed by Khalid El-Shaikh for the television series “Suwalef Dunya”) - Qatar Television.

- 2005 - Dream Layers with sculptor Khalid Farhan - Bahrain.

(Performed live piano improvisations in the opening for the first exhibition of the Bahraini sculptor Khalid Farhan “Dream Layers”, inspired by the Sculptures - Abdulla Al Zayed house for Bahrain Press Heritage) - Muharraq.

- 2004 - Poetry recital with poet Qassim Haddad - Bahrain.

(Played the Arabic Lute as an accompanist to the Bahraini poet Qassim Haddad in a poetry recital - Sheikh Ibrahim Bin Mohammed Al-Khalifa Center for Culture and Research) - Muharraq.

== Awards ==
Mohammed Haddad has won the Excellence Prize in Bahraini Theatrical Performance for ‘Best Music & Sound Effects’ twice and back-to-back. In 2004, he won it for his music composition in the play News of the Mad Lover, And in 2005, he won it once again for his work in the play Adhari directed by Juma'an Al-Rowaie. Haddad was recognized and honored by the directorate of culture and national heritage of the ministry of information in the Kingdom of Bahrain.

In August 2008 he awarded an appreciation certificate for his original music for both short films Absence & A Dinner from Al-Reef second Short Film Festival in Bahrain.

Award	Year	Project	Category	Outcome
Global Music Awards	2012	Tarafa	Best of Show Winner	Won
