= Ala Ghawas =

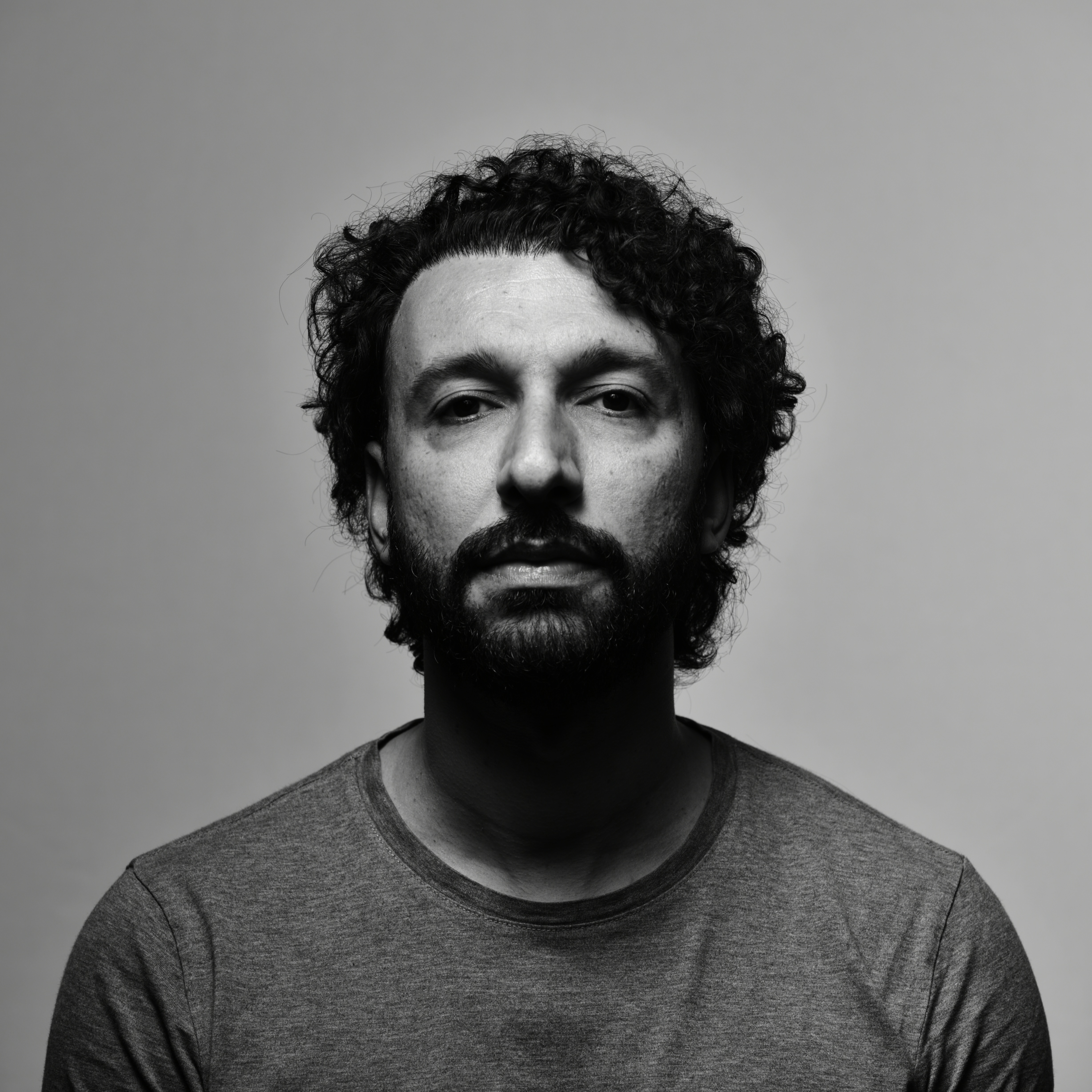
- Ala Ghawas in 2021

Background information
- Born: Alaa Abdulla Ghawas; 22 July 1981 (age 45)
- Origin: Muharraq, Kingdom of Bahrain
- Genres: Indie folk, Chamber Pop, Folktronica
- Occupations: singer-songwriter; record producer; media executive
- Instruments: Vocals, piano, acoustic guitar
- Years active: 2007–present
- Label: Maddiver Records (Founder)
- Spouse: Fatema Fuad
- Website: www.alaghawas.com

Ala Ghawas (Arabic: علاء غوّاص; born 22 July 1981) is a Bahraini singer-songwriter, musician, record producer, and media executive. He is known for his independent music career blending Arabic musical influences with Western folk rock and alternative songwriting traditions.

In 2026, he was appointed Chief Executive Officer of Radio Bahrain Company, the operator of Bahrain's English-language radio station 96.5 FM, which is owned by Mumtalakat, the sovereign wealth fund of the Kingdom of Bahrain.

== Early life and education ==
Ghawas was born in Muharraq, Bahrain. He earned a Master's degree in Integrated Marketing Communication at Emerson College in Boston as a Fulbright Scholar. Ghawas developed an interest in songwriting and music production at an early age, drawing influence from artists such as Khaled El Sheikh, Ziad Rahbani, Jackson Browne, and Bob Dylan.

== Music career ==
=== 2007–2011: Debut trilogy of EPs ===
Ghawas recorded and released his debut EP, Hums, in 2007 during his time in Boston. Following its release, he issued two additional EPs: Whispers in 2008 and Screams in 2009.

After a series of performances at music festivals following the release of his first three EPs, Ghawas performed his first solo concert on 19 November 2009 at the Shaikh Ebrahim Center in Muharraq. Recordings from the concert were later released digitally in 2011 as Ala Ghawas: Live from Muharraq.

=== 2012–2016: "Armor" and partnership with Likwid ===
Beginning in 2012, Ghawas spent nearly two years writing songs for his debut LP, Armor, and collaborated with the Bahraini band Likwid in recording the album. He also worked with Bahraini composer Mohammed Haddad, who arranged live string sections for several songs on the record. Armor was released in November 2013 and was followed by live performances in Bahrain, Dubai, and Cairo.

In 2015, Ghawas recorded and filmed a live concert and documentary at his home titled Ala Ghawas & Likwid: Live from Allston, referencing the Boston neighborhood where he lived during his studies. The film was produced and directed by Bahraini filmmaker Saleh Nass.

=== 2017–2019: "Tryst" and "Live from Grace" ===
Ghawas released his fifth studio album, Tryst, in November 2017. The album was written and produced by Ghawas and engineered by Abdulla Jamal. The cover artwork was created in collaboration with Bahraini artist Abbas Almosawi.

In 2019, he recorded and filmed his third live album, Ala Ghawas: Live from Grace, featuring collaborations with artists including Ahmed Alqasim, Fawaz Alshaikh, Ali Alqaseer, Abdulla Haji, Isa Najem, Eman Haddad, and Hassan Haddad.

=== 2020–2023: Khaled El Sheikh's influence, "Brouvat Mout" and return to Arabic ===
During the COVID-19 pandemic, Ghawas reconnected with the work of Bahraini musician Khaled El Sheikh, whom he has cited as a major influence. He later recorded a cover of El Sheikh’s song Makan Aamin Lilhob ("A Safe Place for Love").

On November 24, 2021, Ghawas released his sixth studio album and first Arabic-language album, Brouvat Mout ("A Death Rehearsal"), written by Ghawas and co-produced with Bahraini musician Isa Najem.

On 21 February 2022, he performed at the Spring of Culture Festival, organized by the Bahrain Authority for Culture and Antiquities. The performance was later released as a live album titled Ala Ghawas: Live from Manama.

=== 2024–Present: Fatherhood and "Reimagined" ===
In 2024, Ghawas released the single Fe Hedhen Ellail ("In the Embrace of Night"), dedicated to the first birthday of his son, Jubran.

In early 2025, he released the collaborative EP Reimagined, which featured reinterpretations of his songs produced by Bahraini artists including Isa Najem, Hind Dito, Maxeem Ghawas, The Relocators, Eman Haddad, and Esam Hammad.

== Discography ==
=== Studio albums ===
- 2013 – Armor (English)
- 2017 – Tryst (English)
- 2021 – Brouvat Mout (Arabic)

=== EPs ===
- 2007 – Hums (English)
- 2008 – Whispers (English)
- 2009 – Screams (English)
- 2025 – Reimagined (English/Arabic)

=== Live Albums ===
- 2011 – Live from Muharraq (English)
- 2015 – Live from Allston (English)
- 2019 – Live from Grace (English)
- 2023 – Live from Manama (English/Arabic)

=== Singles ===
- 2024 – Fe Hedhen Ellail (Arabic)

== Radio career ==
In 2026, Ghawas was appointed Chief Executive Officer of Radio Bahrain Company (RBC), the operator of Bahrain’s English-language radio station 96.5 FM.

Prior to joining Radio Bahrain, he held leadership roles in the telecommunications and advertising industries in Bahrain, working in marketing, brand strategy, customer engagement, and sponsorship activation.
