= Fatima Abdul Raheem =

Bahraini actress (born 1975)

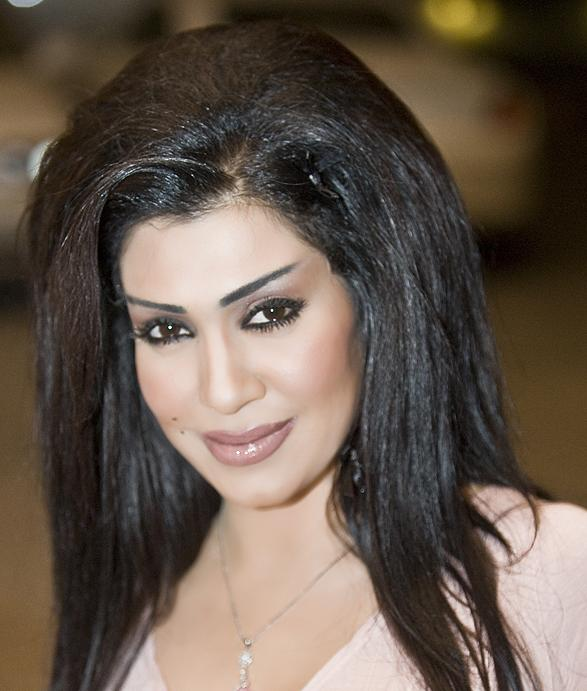
- Born: Fatima Mohamed Abdul Raheem; 15 October 1975 (age 50); Muharraq
- Occupation: Actor
- Years active: 1989–present

Fatima Abdul Raheem (Arabic: فاطمة عبد الرحيم; born October 15, 1975) is a Bahraini actress.

Raheem began her career in youth theater in 1989. Since then, she has acted in serials, plays and several movies.

== Biography ==
She did not aim to have an acting career and studied a science until unforeseen circumstances interrupted her studies and she pursued a modeling career. In 1996, she made her commercial acting debut in the television serial Ajayeb Zaman. Her first starring role was in the 1998 Saudi series Ailat Abu Ruwaished, leading to many more featured performances and her film debut in the 2004 horror film Za’er.

=== Personal life ===
She is divorced from the father of her children, Noah and Layal.

== Works ==
=== Television series ===
Filmography
| Year | Series | Role |
|---|---|---|
| 1996 | Ajayeb Zaman | |
| 1997 | Ahlam Dayiea | |
| 1997 | بحر الحكايات | several roles |
| 1998 | Ailat Abu Ruwaished | Heila |
| 2000 | Niran | Saliha |
| 2001 | اخوة الشر | |
| 2002 | بقايا رماد | |
| 2002 | Noura | |
| 2003 | Yoam Akher | Laila |
| 2004 | Life Has Another Face | |
| 2004 | The Next Odd | |
| 2004 | Calms and Storms | Hanin |
| 2004 | Ghassat Al Hanin | |
| 2006 | Without Chains | |
| 2006 | غلطة عمر | |
| 2006 | Night Madness | |
| 2006 | حسب التوقيت المحلي | |
| 2006 | Tash ma Tash | several roles |
| 2007 | Kany we Many | several roles |
| 2007 | Another Face | |
| 2007 | Me, You, and the Internet | |
| 2007 | Eyes of Glass | |
| 2008 | May What Evil | |
| 2008 | Al-Sakinat fi Qulubina | |
| 2008 | اليرام | |
| 2008 | Malamih al Bashar | |
| 2008 | Ayoub | |
| 2008 | Zil Al-Yasimin | |
| 2009 | Aimra'at Wa'ukhraa | |
| 2009 | Perfume | |
| 2009 | الإعتذار | |
| 2010 | Lil Hayat Thaman | |
| 2010-2011 | The Multigamist | |
| 2010-2015 | Sawalef Tafash | Lolwah |
| 2010 | Ma Asaa'b Alkalam | |
| 2010 | On Her Death I Sing | |
| 2011 | Days and Nights | |
| 2011 | Khayat Al-Omar | |
| 2011-2012 | My Eye Is Your Eye | |
| 2011 | Impossible Love | |
| 2012 | Loulou Morjan | Mariam |
| 2012 | Sakattum Bakattum | |
| 2012 | Nisaa' min Zujaj | |
| 2013 | Ay Damaa Hozn La | |
| 2014 | Qabl Al Awan | |
| 2014 | Love, But | |
| 2014 | El Hob Sultan | |
| 2014 | Ahl Eldar | |
| 2015 | Jadda Loulua | Ghadir |
| 2015 | Aam Elgamr | |
| 2015 | Enkesar Al-Samt | |
| 2016 | I Found My Soul | |
| 2016 | Bab Elreh | Marimy |
| 2017 | Mamnoo' Al-Woqoof | Afaf |
| 2017 | Selfie | several roles |
| 2018 | No Filter | |
| 2019 | ورق مسموم | |
| 2020 | Love You No More | Malak |
| 2020 | Hikayat Ibn Al-Haddad | Zubaidah |

=== Theatre ===
Stage career
| Year | Play |
|---|---|
| 1998 | A Very Private House |
| 2006 | دايخ في زمن بايخ |
| 2007 | شباب الجامعة |
| 2007 | العصابة في الوادي |
| 2009 | وناسة |
| 2012 | And Then |
| 2013 | Al Mashkalji |
| 2015 | آه يا القهر |
| 2016 | Khafif Khafif |
| 2017 | مغتر ومفلس |

=== Film ===
Filmography
| Year | Film |
|---|---|
| 2004 | Za’er |
| 2004 | Shabab Cool |
| 2006 | Haneen |
| 2006 | A Bahraini Tale |
| 2009 | Al Dunjuwana |
| 2009 | Marimy |

== Awards ==
- 2009 “Best Actress in a Supporting Role” at the 10th Gulf Theater Festival for her role in the play Noura
- 2009: Dubai International Film Festival Muhr Award for “Best Actress” in the film Marimy
