= Latifa Al Megren =

Bahraini actress (born 1956)

- لطيفة المجرن
- Born: Latifa Al Mejren; April 13, 1954 (age 71); Muharraq, Bahrain
- Occupation: actress
- Years active: 1971—Present
- Spouse: Hammoud Mohammed
- Children: Wafa, Maha, Mohammed, Hamad, Fawaz

Latifa Al Megren (Arabic: لطيفة المجرن, also rendered as Latifa Al-Mejren, born April 13, 1954) is a Bahraini actress.

== Biography ==
Her first dramatic role was in the 1973 series Wugooh La Illa, co-starring actors from the Al-Ahsa Governorate in Saudi Arabia’s Saudi Arabia, including Hassan Al-Abdi, Omar Al-Obeidi, and Abdelrahman Al-Hamad. After her career started in earnest in 1989, she became famous for her warm, maternal roles, but she branched out into many others both comic and tragic. She is married to Hammoud Muhammad, and they have five children: Wafaa, Maha, Muhammad, Hamad, and Fawaz.

== Selected filmography ==
=== Television series ===
Year	Series	Role
1980	Salamtak	
1989	29 سالفة وسالفة	
1990	Khazina	
1990	Sawalif Umm Hilal	
1990	Rhelat El-Ajaayeb	
1993	The Last Born	
1993	Sulaiman Al Tayeb	
1993	الدوائر	
1993	Al-Bayt Al-Oud	
1994	Ayal Qarya	
1994	Abdullah Al-Beri and Abdullah Al-Bahri	
1994	Sorry, Father	
1994	Sons of Abu Jassim	
1994	Al-Oqab	
1994	Farjan Loul	
1994	عيال صابر	
1995	Zarie Alshari	
1995	ملفى الأياويد	
1995	صالح تحت التدريب	
1995	Hassan and Nour Al-Sana	
1995	Hawazi Al-Dar	
1995	My Eyes to the Sea	
1995	جميلة	
1995	Tash ma Tash	several roles
1996	Ajayeb Zaman	
1996	We Regret This Error	
1996	Bayt Al-Moghtanei	
1996	أقنعة حقيقية (TV movie)	
1996-1997	Dalaq Sahil	
1997	Al-Tayr Wa Al-Easifa	
1997	Tayr Al-Khayr	
1997	الكلمة الطيبة	
1997	Al-Warith	
1997	Bu Qalbayn	
1997	Al-Sahih Ma Yutih	
1998	Ailat Abu Ruwaished	Umm Ruwaished
1998	Sabie Jar	
1999	Suroor	
1999	Al-Mudhi	
2000	Fayez Al-Toush 2	
2000	Khalk Maei	
2000	Niran	
2000	حكم الزمان	
2001	Jerh Al Zaman	
2001	Jorouh Bareda	
2001	دموع شارع	
2001	Al-Hayat Aimra’a	
2001	درب الخطايا	
2002	Masna Al-Rijal	
2002	المتقاعد	
2002	Destiny Game	
2002	أبو رش رش	
2003	Baytona Al-Kabeer	
2003	Years of Silence	
2003	ملاذ الطير	
2003	Mara Al-Sinin	
2003	Dumeat Eumar	
2003	Darb El Mahabh	
2003	وجه واحد لا يكفي	
2003	Dumue Al-Rijal	
2004	Abo Al Asafeer	
2004	B'ad Alshatat	
2004	Omaret El Asrar	
2004	Calms and Storms	
2004	Al-Shogardi	
2004	Ma Wa’Ahlam	
2005	Alyak Saeed wa Mubarak	
2005	Al-Buya	
2005	Doyoub	
2005	Sawalif Dunyana	
2006	Quyud Al-Zaman	
2006	Ghashamsham	
2006	Aswar	
2006	Jinun Al-Mal	
2007	A Moment of Weakness	
2007	Ammouna's Diary	
2007	Azhar Maryam	
2007	The Liberals	
2007	Al-Aseel	
2007	Killers of the Brave	
2007	Oh-Yamal	
2008	Eyoun El-Hob	
2008	عسى ماشر	
2008	Ailaty	Narjis
2009-2011	Laila	
2009	Al-Waritha	
2009	Bahr's Children	
2009	Garry Ya Hammouda	
2009	Souq Waqif	
2009	Noor Einy	
2009	Colonel Shamma	
2009	Eadhab	
2009	Warak Warak	
2010	Fi Baytina Ghashna	
2010	On Her Death I Sing	
2010	Anin	
2010	Qissat Hawana	
2010	مزحه برزحه	
2011	Glowing Candles	
2011	Saher Al-Lail 2: Zinat Al-Haya	
2011	Sometimes Love Is Not Enough	
2011	Days and Nights	
2011	Wagaa El Antesar	Umm Turki
2012	Eshrt Eumar	
2012	Between Past and Love	
2012	Al-Thaman	
2012	Night Shift	
2012	A Woman Seeking Forgiveness	
2012	Banat Aljami'a	
2012	Hashtaging	
2012	Molhaq Banat	Umm Ibrahim
2012	Khadimat Al-Kawm	
2012	Any Service?	
2012	Galtham and Maytha	
2013	Burkan Na'am	
2014	Kheff Aleina	
2015	Sadiqati Al Eazizat	
2015	Harb El Qoloob	
2016	Bab Elreh	
2016	Khams Banat	Ruqayyah
2016	Harim Aboy	Khazana
2017	Souf Taht Harir	
2017	Darb Al-Earayis	
2017	The Dreamers	
2018	Ezwiti	Ghanima
2019	Ghusun Fi Al-Wahl	Sharifah
2019	Oshaq Raghm Al Talaq	Umm Mahmoud

=== Theatre ===
Year	Play	Role
2016	Frozen: The Snow Queen	

=== Film ===
Year	Film	Role
1990	The Barrier	
2006	A Bahraini Tale	
2012	اخر ايام الوفاء	
2015	Habib Al-Ardh	
