= Neuchâtel International Fantastic Film Festival =

Swiss film festival

- 2025 Festival poster
- Location: Neuchâtel, Switzerland
- Established: 2000
- Founded by: Anaïs Emery and Olivier Müller
- Most recent: 2025
- Directors: Pierre-Yves Walder
- No. of films: 127
- Festival date: Opening: 4 July 2025; Closing: 12 July 2025
- Language: International
- Website: nifff.ch

Current: 24th
- 25th 23rd

The Neuchâtel International Fantastic Film Festival (NIFFF) is a film festival dedicated to fantastic films held since 2000 in Neuchâtel, Switzerland. The festival constructs its programming around three central axes: Fantastic cinema, Asian cinema and Digital images. The films shown at the festival range from major works by renowned directors, to unknown and underground films d'auteurs. Notable attendees include George A. Romero, Joe Dante, John Landis, Terry Gilliam, Hideo Nakata.

The NIFFF offers five competitions: an international competition, an Asian competition, a Best Swiss Short Film Competition, a Best European Short Film Competition and a Swiss Video Art Competition entitled Actual Fears and inaugurated in 2008.

Retrospective themes have included "Scream Queer" (2022), "Female Trouble" (2023) and "Eat the Rich" (2024).

The 24th edition of the film festival was held from 4 July to 12 July 2025, featuring 127 films from 42 countries.

== Winners ==
Year	Award	Film	Country	Director
2025 (24th)	H. R. Giger Award « Narcisse » for Best Feature Film	The Ice Tower	France; Germany; Italy	Lucile Hadžihalilovic
2025 (24th)	Special mention International Jury	Her Will Be Done	France; Poland	Julia Kowalski
2024 (23rd)	H. R. Giger Award « Narcisse » for Best Feature Film	Handling the Undead	Norway	Thea Hvistendahl
2024 (23rd)	H. R. Giger Award « Narcisse » for Best Feature Film	Ennennum	India	Shalini Ushadevi
2023	H. R. Giger Award « Narcisse » for Best Feature Film	Tiger Stripes	Malaysia; Taiwan; France; Germany; Netherlands; Indonesia; Qatar	Simon Reith
2023	Special mention International Jury	Superposition	Denmark	Karoline Lyngbye
2023	Audience RTS Award	Raging Grace	United Kingdom	Paris Zarcilla
2023	International Critic's Award	Raging Grace	United Kingdom	Paris Zarcilla
2023	Youth Award	Raging Grace	United Kingdom	Paris Zarcilla
2023	Imaging The Future Award for Best Design Production	Pearl	United States	Ti West
2023	Silver Méliès Award for Best European Film	Vincent doit mourir	France; Belgium	Stéphan Castang
2023	Best Asian Movie Award	Marry My Dead Body	Taiwan	Cheng Wei-hao
2023	H. R. Giger «Narcisse» Award for Best Swiss Short	Pipess	Switzerland	Kilian Feusi, Jessica Meier, Sujanth Ravichandran
2023	Silver Méliès Award for Best European Short	Ce dit d'un cerf qui quitte son bois	Belgium	Salomé Crickx
2023	SSA/Suissimage special mention	Der Molchkongress	Switzerland	Immanuel Esser, Matthias Sahli
2023	Youth Award Short	Foreigners Only	Bangladesh	Nuhash Humayun
2023	Audience Award Short	Foreigners Only	Bangladesh	Nuhash Humayun
2022	H. R. Giger Award « Narcisse » for Best Feature Film	Nos cérémonies	France	Simon Reith
2022	Special mention International Jury	Blaze	Australia	Del Kathryn Barton
2022	Imaging The Future Award for Best Design Production	Blaze	Australia	Del Kathryn Barton
2022	Silver Méliès Award for Best European Film	Men	United Kingdom	Alex Garland
2022	International Critic's Award	Ashkal	France; Qatar; Turkey	Youssef Chebbi
2022	Audience RTS Award	Freaks Out	Italy, Belgium	Gabriele Mainetti
2022	Best Asian Movie Award	Demigod: The Legend Begins	Taiwan	Chris Huang
2022	Youth Award	Hypochondriac	United States	Addison Heimann
2022	H. R. Giger «Narcisse» Award for Best Swiss Short	Les héritières	Switzerland	Avril Lehmann
2022	Silver Méliès Award for Best European Short	Mr. Pete and the Iron Horse	Switzerland	Kilian Vilim
2022	SSA/Suissimage special mention	Avant 3 nuits	France	Minna Prader
2022	Youth Award Short	Avant 3 nuits	France	Minna Prader
2022	Audience Award Short	Moshari	Bangladesh	Nuhash Humayun
2021	H. R. Giger Award « Narcisse » for Best Feature Film	Lapsis	United States	Noah Hutton
2021	Special mention International Jury	Cryptozoo	United States	Dash Shaw
2021	Silver Méliès Award for Best European Film	Boys from County Hell	Ireland	Chris Baugh
2021	International Critic's Award	The Feast	United Kingdom	Lee Haven Jones
2021	Imaging The Future Award for Best Design Production	Tides	Switzerland	Tim Fehlbaum & Julian R. Wagner
2021	Audience RTS Award	Tides	Switzerland	Tim Fehlbaum & Julian R. Wagner
2021	Best Asian Movie Award	Ok! Madam	South Korea	Lee Cheol-ha
2021	Youth Award	Censor	United Kingdom	Prano Bailey-Bond
2021	H. R. Giger «Narcisse» Award for Best Swiss Short	Little Miss Fate	Switzerland	Joder von Rotz
2021	Silver Méliès Award for Best European Short	Little Miss Fate	Switzerland	Joder von Rotz
2021	Taurus Studio Innovation Award	Phlegm	Switzerland	Jan-David Bolt
2020	H. R. Giger Award « Narcisse » for Best Feature Film	Dinner in America	United States	Adam Rehmeier
2019	H. R. Giger Award « Narcisse » for Best Feature Film	Extra Ordinary	Ireland; Belgium	Mike Ahern & Enda Loughman
2019	Audience RTS Award	Extra Ordinary	Ireland; Belgium	Mike Ahern & Enda Loughman
2019	Silver Méliès Award for Best European Film	Abou Leila	Algeria; France; Qatar	Amin Sidi-Boumédiène
2019	International Critic's Award	Swallow	United States; France	Carlo Mirabella-Davis
2019	Imaging The Future Award for Best Design Production	Jesus Shows You the Way to the Highway	Ethiopia; Spain; Estonia	A Miguel Llansó, Anna-Liisa Liiver, Aitor and Fran Almuedo
2019	Best Asian Movie Award	The Fable	Japan	Kan Eguchi
2019	Youth Award	Come to Daddy	New Zealand; Canada; Ireland; United States	Ant Timpson
2019	H. R. Giger «Narcisse» Award for Best Swiss Short	Dispersion	Switzerland	Basile Vuillemin
2019	Silver Méliès Award for Best European Short	Dispersion	Switzerland	Basile Vuillemin
2019	Taurus Studio Innovation Award	Hand in Hand	Switzerland	Ennio Ruschetti
2018	H. R. Giger Award « Narcisse » for Best Feature Film	Climax	France	Gaspar Noé
2018	Silver Méliès Award for Best European Film	Climax	France	Gaspar Noé
2018	International Critic's Award	Piercing	United States	Nicolas Pesce
2018	Imaging The Future Award for Best Design Production	Piercing	United States	Nicolas Pesce
2018	Audience RTS Award	Kasane	Japan	Satō Yūichi
2018	Best Asian Movie Award	Bad Genius	Thailand	Nattawut Poonpiriya
2018	Youth Award	Under the Silver Lake	United States	David Robert Mitchell
2018	H. R. Giger «Narcisse» Award for Best Swiss Short	Crepuscule	Switzerland	Pauline Jeanbourquin
2018	Silver Méliès Award for Best European Short	Crepuscule	Switzerland	Pauline Jeanbourquin
2018	Taurus Studio Innovation Award	Das Mädchen im Schnee	Switzerland	Denis Ledergerber
2018	Outside the Box Award	Cómprame un Revólver	Mexico	Julio Hernández Cordón
2017	H. R. Giger Award « Narcisse » for Best Feature Film	Super Dark Times	United States	Kevin Phillips
2017	Silver Méliès Award for Best European Film	El bar	Spain	Álex de la Iglesia
2017	International Critic's Award	The Endless	United States	Justin Benson and Aaron Moorhead
2017	Imaging The Future Award for Best Design Production	The Endless	United States	Justin Benson and Aaron Moorhead
2017	Best Asian Movie Award	Trapped	India	Vikramaditya Motwane
2017	Youth Award	Hostile	France	Mathieu Turi
2017	Audience RTS Award	JoJo's Bizarre Adventure: Diamond Is Unbreakable Chapter I	Japan	Takashi Miike
2017	H. R. Giger «Narcisse» Award for Best Swiss Short	The Bridge over the River	Switzerland	Jadwiga Kowalska
2017	Silver Méliès Award for Best European Short	The Bridge over the River	Switzerland	Jadwiga Kowalska
2017	Taurus Studio Innovation Award	Sons of Bitches	Switzerland	Arnaud Baur
2016	H. R. Giger Award « Narcisse » for Best Feature Film	Under the Shadow	Iran; Jordan; Qatar; United Kingdom	Babak Anvari
2016	Silver Méliès Award for Best European Film	Forældre	Denmark	Christian Tafdrup
2016	International Critic's Award	Swiss Army Man	United States	Daniel Scheinert, Dan Kwan
2016	Imaging The Future Award for Best Design Production	Swiss Army Man	United States	Daniel Scheinert, Dan Kwan
2016	Audience RTS Award	Swiss Army Man	United States	Daniel Scheinert, Dan Kwan
2016	Best Asian Movie Award	Honor Thy Father	Philippines	Erik Matti
2016	Youth Award	Detour	United Kingdom; South Africa	Christopher Smith
2016	H. R. Giger «Narcisse» Award for Best Swiss Short	Ivan's Need	Switzerland	Veronica Lingg, Manuela Leuenberger & Lukas Suter
2016	Silver Méliès Award for Best European Short	Ivan's Need	Switzerland	Veronica Lingg, Manuela Leuenberger & Lukas Suter
2016	Taurus Studio Innovation Award	Belle comme un coeur	Switzerland	Gregory Casares
2015	H. R. Giger Award « Narcisse » for Best Feature Film	Green Room	United States	Jeremy Saulnier
2015	Youth Award Denis-de-Rougemont	Green Room	United States	Jeremy Saulnier
2015	Audience RTS Award	Green Room	United States	Jeremy Saulnier
2015	Silver Melies to the best fantastic film	Men & Chicken	Denmark	Anders Thomas Jensen
2015	International Critic's Award	The Invitation	United States	Karyn Kusama
2015	Imaging The Future Award for best design production	Crumbs	Ethiopia	Miguel Llansò
2015	Best Asian Movie Award	Full Strike	Hong Kong	Henri Wong & Derek Kwok
2015	H. R. Giger "Narcisse" Award to the best swiss short - SSA/Suissimage Competition	Es war finster und merkwürdig still	Switzerland	Mirella Brunold & Nina Calderone
2015	Méliès d’argent to the best european fantastic short	Es war finster und merkwürdig still	Switzerland	Mirella Brunold & Nina Calderone
2015	Prix Tauris Studio for innovation	Parasit	Switzerland	Diego Hauenstein
2014	H. R. Giger Award « Narcisse » for Best Feature Film	Housebound	New Zealand	Gerard Johnstone
2014	Silver Méliès Award for Best European Film	Blind	Norway	Eskil Vogt
2014	Imaging The Future Award for Best Design Production	The Mole Song : Undercover Agent Reiji	Japan	Takashi Miiike
2014	Best Asian Movie Award	Yasmine	Brunei	Siti Kamaluddin, Chan Man-Ching
2014	International Critic's Award	It Follows	United States	David Robert Mitchell
2014	Youth Award	It Follows	United States	David Robert Mitchell
2014	Audience RTS Award	What We Do in the Shadows	New Zealand	Jemaine Clement, Taika Waititi
2014	H. R. Giger «Narcisse» Award for Best Swiss Short	Lothar	Switzerland	Luca Zuberbühler
2014	Silver Méliès Award for Best European Short	Lothar	Switzerland	Luca Zuberbühler
2014	Taurus Studio Innovation Award	Pappkameraden	Switzerland	Stefan Bischoff, Stephan Wiki
2013	H. R. Giger Award « Narcisse » for Best Feature Film	Dark Touch	France; Ireland; Sweden	Marina de Van
2013	Mad Movies Award to the «Maddest» Movie	Dark Touch	France; Ireland; Sweden	Marina de Van
2013	Youth Award	Dark Touch	France; Ireland; Sweden	Marina de Van
2013	Special mention of the International Jury	Chimères	Switzerland	Olivier Beguin
2013	Silver Méliès Award for Best European Film	In the Name of the Son	Belgium	Vincent Lannoo
2013	Imaging The Future Award for Best Design Production	Ghost Graduation	Spain	Javier Ruiz Caldera
2013	Special mention of the Imaging The Future Jury	Mars and April (Mars et Avril)	Canada	Martin Villeneuve
2013	Best Asian Movie Award	Eega	India	S.S Rajamouli, J.V.V Sathyanarayana
2013	Speciale mention of the Mad Movies Jury	Eega	India	S.S Rajamouli, J.V.V Sathyanarayana
2013	Blaise Cendrars Youth Award	The Crack	Colombia; Argentina	Alfonso Acosta
2013	Audience RTS Award	You're Next	United States	Adam Wingard
2013	Titra Film Award	The Dyatlov Pass Incident	Finland	Renny Harlin
2013	H. R. Giger «Narcisse» Award for Best Swiss Short	Palim Palim	Switzerland	Marina Klauser, Pia Hellenthal
2013	Taurus Studio Award	Palim Palim	Switzerland	Marina Klauser, Pia Hellenthal
2013	Special mention of the SSA/Suissimage Jury	Pocket Rocket	Switzerland	Walter Feistle
2013	Taurus Studio Innovation Award	Effort	Switzerland	Eleonora Berra
2013	Silver Méliès Award for Best European Short	Entre Ange et Demon	Switzerland	Pascal Forney
2012	H. R. Giger Award « Narcisse » for Best Feature Film	Citadel	Ireland	Ciaran Foy
2012	Special mention of the Mad Movies Jury	Citadel	Ireland	Ciaran Foy
2012	Silver Méliès Award for Best European Film	Citadel	Ireland	Ciaran Foy
2012	Special mention of the International Jury	Vanishing Waves	Lithuania	Kristina Buozyté
2012	Best Asian Movie Award	Remington and the Curse of the Zombadings	Philippines	Jade Castro
2012	Youth Award	The Butterfly Room	Italy	Jonathan Zarantonello
2012	Mad Movies Award for the «Maddest» Movie	Resolution	United States	Justin Benson, Aaron Moorhead
2012	Titra Film Award	Grabbers	United Kingdom	Jon Wright
2012	TSR Audience Award	Grabbers	United Kingdom	Jon Wright
2012	H. R. Giger Award « Narcisse » for Best Swiss Short	Zimmer 606	Switzerland	Peter Volkart
2012	Taurus Studio Award	Zimmer 606	Switzerland	Peter Volkart
2012	Silver Méliès Award for Best European Short	Zimmer 606	Switzerland	Peter Volkart
2012	Taurus Studio Innovation Award	Magnetfelder	Switzerland	Jan-Eric Mack
2011	H. R. Giger Award « Narcisse » for Best Feature Film	Trollhunter	Norway	André Øvredal
2011	TSR Audience Award	Trollhunter	Norway	André Øvredal
2011	Silver Méliès for Best European Film	Trollhunter	Norway	André Øvredal
2011	Special Mention from the International Jury	Stake Land	United States	Jim Mickle
2011	Best Asian Film Award	Hello Ghost	South Korea	Kim Young-tak
2011	The Denis-de-Rougemont Youth Award	Wake Wood	United Kingdom; Ireland	David Keating
2011	Mad Movies Award for the «Maddest» Film	The Violent Kind	United States	Butcher Brothers
2011	Titra Film Award	Insidious	United States	James Wan
2011	H. R. Giger Award « Narcisse » for Best Swiss Short	Evermore	Switzerland	Philip Hofmänner
2011	Taurus Studio Award	Evermore	Switzerland	Philip Hofmänner
2011	Taurus Studio Award for Innovation	Employe Du Mois	Switzerland	Olivier Béguin
2011	Nomination for the Golden Méliès for Best European Short	Brutal Relax	Spain	David Munoz, Adrian Cardona, Rafa Dengra
2010	H. R. Giger Award « Narcisse » for Best Feature Film	Enter The Void	France	Gaspar Noé
2010	TSR Audience Award	Black Death	United Kingdom	Chris Smith
2010	The Denis-de-Rougemont Youth Award	Strayed	Kazakhstan	Akan Satayev
2010	The Silver Méliès for Best European Film	Strigoi	United Kingdom	Faye Jackson
2010	Mad Movies Award for the «Maddest» Film	Dream Home	Hong Kong	Pang Ho-Cheung
2010	Special mention of the Jury	Dream Home	Hong Kong	Pang Ho-Cheung
2010	Best Asian Movie Award	WIG	Japan	Renpei Tsukamoto
2010	Titra Film Award	Valhalla Rising	Denmark	Nicolas Winding Refn
2010	H. R. Giger Award « Narcisse » for Best Swiss Short	Danny Boy	Switzerland	Marek Skrobecki
2010	The Taurus Studio Award	Danny Boy	Switzerland	Marek Skrobecki
2010	The Taurus Studio for Innovation Award	Ich Bin's Helmut	Germany	Nicolas Steiner
2010	Nomination for the Golden Méliès for Best European Short	Try a Little Tenderness	Germany	Benjamin Teske
2009	H. R. Giger Award « Narcisse » for Best Feature Film	Fish Story	Japan	Yoshihiro Nakamura
2009	The Denis-de-Rougemont Youth Award	Fish Story	Japan	Yoshihiro Nakamura
2009	Special mention of the Jury	Infestation	United States	Kyle Rankin
2009	TSR Audience Award	Connected	Hong Kong, China	Benny Chan
2009	The Silver Méliès for Best European Film	Left Bank	Belgium	Pieter Van Hees
2009	Mad Movies Award for «le film le plus Mad»	Left Bank	Belgium	Pieter Van Hees
2009	Best Asian Movie Award	The Handsome Suit	Japan	Tsutomu Hanabusa
2009	Titra Film Award	Antichrist	Denmark; Poland; Germany; Sweden; Italy	Lars Von Trier
2009	H. R. Giger Award « Narcisse » for Best Swiss Short	Le Petit Dragon	Switzerland	Bruno Collet
2009	The Taurus Studio Award	Le Petit Dragon	Switzerland	Bruno Collet
2009	The Taurus Studio for Innovation Award	Déjà	Switzerland	Antonin Schopfer
2009	Nomination for the Golden Méliès for Best European Short	Tile M for Murder	Sweden	Magnus Holmgren
2008	H. R. Giger Award « Narcisse » for Best Feature Film	Sleep Dealer	United States; Mexico	Alex Rivera
2008	Special mention of the Jury	Tokyo!	France; Japan; Germany; South Korea	Bong Joon-ho, Leos Carax, Michel Gondry
2008	Titra Film Award	Tokyo!	France; Japan; Germany; South Korea	Bong Joon-ho, Leos Carax, Michel Gondry
2008	TSR Audience Award	CJ7		Stephen Chow
2008	The Silver Méliès for Best European Feature Film	Let the Right One in	Sweden	Tomas Alfredson
2008	Special mention of the Jury	Let the Right One in	Sweden	Tomas Alfredson
2008	The Denis-de-Rougemont Youth Award	Let the Right One in	Sweden	Tomas Alfredson
2008	Mad Movies Award for Best Asian Movie	Om Shanti Om	India	Farah Khan
2008	H. R. Giger Award « Narcisse » for Best Swiss Short	Vincent le Magnifique	Switzerland	Pascal Forney
2008	H. R. Giger Award « Narcisse » for Best Art Video	The Counterfeiters	Switzerland; United States	Katia Bassanini
2008	Nomination for the Golden Méliès for Best European Short	Scary	Netherlands	Martijn Hullegie
2007	H. R. Giger Award « Narcisse » for Best Feature Film	You, the Living	Sweden	Roy Andersson
2007	Titra Film Award	You, the Living	Sweden	Roy Andersson
2007	Special mention of the Jury	The Ugly Swans	Russia	Konstantin Lopishansky
2007	Silver Méliès for Best European Feature Film	The Ugly Swans	Russia	Konstantin Lopishansky
2007	TSR Audience Award	Black Sheep	New Zealand	Jonathan King
2007	Mad Movies Award for Best Asian Movie	Don	India	Farhan Akthar
2007	The Denis-de-Rougemont Youth Award	La Antena	Argentina	Esteban Sapir
2007	H. R. Giger Award « Narcisse » for Best Swiss Short	City Wasp	Switzerland	Steven Tod
2007	Nomination for the Golden Méliès for Best European Short	Silence Is Golden	United Kingdom	Christ Sheperd
2006	H. R. Giger Award « Narcisse » for Best Feature Film	The Bothersome Man	Norway; Iceland	Jens Lien
2006	Golden Méliès for Best European Film	The Bothersome Man	Norway; Iceland	Jens Lien
2006	TSR Audience Award	Adam's Apples	Denmark; Germany	Anders Thomas Jensen
2006	The Denis-de-Rougemont Youth Award	Adam's Apples	Denmark; Germany	Anders Thomas Jensen
2006	Mad Movies Award for Best Asian Movie	SPL	Hong Kong	Wilson Yip
2006	H. R. Giger Award « Narcisse » for Best Swiss Short	Une Nuit Blanche	Switzerland	Maja Gehrig
2006	Nomination for the Golden Méliès for Best European Short	Dilemma	Netherlands	Boris Paval Conen
2005	H. R. Giger Award « Narcisse » for Best Feature Film	Innocence	France	Lucile Hadzihalilovic
2005	The Denis-de-Rougemont Youth Award	Innocence	France	Lucile Hadzihalilovic
2005	TSR Audience Award	Zeburaman	Japan	Miike Takashi
2005	Mad Movies Award for Best Asian Movie	Zeburaman	Japan	Miike Takashi
2005	Golden Méliès for Best European Film	Code 46	Great Britain	Michael Winterbottom
2005	H. R. Giger Award « Narcisse » for Best Swiss Short	Terra Incognita	Switzerland	Peter Volkart
2004	H. R. Giger Award « Narcisse » for Best Feature Film	The Machinist	United States; Spain	Brad Anderson
2004	Silver Méliès Award for Best Feature Film	The Machinist	United States; Spain	Brad Anderson
2004	TSR Audience Award	Tokyo Godfathers	Japan	Satoshi Kon
2004	Mad Movies Award for Best Asian Movie	Tokyo Godfathers	Japan	Satoshi Kon
2004	The Denis-de-Rougemont Youth Award	The Taste of Tea	Japan	Katsuhito Ishii
2004	SSA/Suissimage Price for Best Swiss Short	Belmondo	Switzerland	Annette Carle
2004	Nomination for the Golden Méliès for Best European Short	7:35 de la Manana	Spain	Nacho Villalongo
2003	H. R. Giger Award « Narcisse » for Best Feature Film	28 Days Later	United States	Danny Boyle
2003	Special mention of the Jury	Gozu	Japan	Takashi Miike
2003	Mad Movies Award for Best Asian Movie	Gozu	Japan	Takashi Miike
2003	TSR Audience Award	The Invisible	Sweden	Joel Bergvall, Simon Sandquist
2003	The Denis-de-Rougemont Youth Award	New Blood	Hong Kong	Pou-soi Cheang
2003	H. R. Giger Award « Narcisse » for Best Swiss Short	Loups	Switzerland	Hugo Veludo
2003	Special mention of the SSA/Suissimage Jury	La Clé d'Argent	Switzerland	Victor Jaquier
2002	H. R. Giger Award « Narcisse » for Best Feature Film	The Yin Yang Master	Japan	Takita Yojiro
2002	The Jury's Omnicrom Prize	Ichi The Killer	Japan	Miike Takashi
2002	TSR Audience Award	Don't Ask, Don't Tell	United States	Doug Miles
2002	H. R. Giger Award « Narcisse » for Best Swiss Short	Joshua	Switzerland	Andreas Müller
2000	H. R. Giger Award « Narcisse » for Best Feature Film	Gemini	Japan	Shinya Tsukamoto
2000	Special mention of the Jury	Blood]	Great Britain	Charly Cantor
2000	H. R. Giger Award « Narcisse » for Best Swiss Short	Time With Nyenne	Switzerland	Olivier Béguin

== See also ==
- List of fantastic and horror film festivals
