= Souad Ali =

Bahraini actress

- سعاد علي
- Born: Souad Hussein Ali; March 6, 1962 (age 64)
- Occupation: actress
- Years active: 1984–Present
- Children: Dalia, Ali, Majid, Wahib

Souad Ali (Arabic: سعاد علي Or OM Ali, born 6 March, 1962) is a Bahraini actress.

== Biography ==
She holds a degree in acting and directing from the Higher Institute of Dramatic Arts in Kuwait. Appearing in many television works produced in Bahrain, Saudi Arabia, Kuwait, and Qatar, she first gained fame appearing in the first seven episodes of the 1998 Kuwaiti production, As the Days Turn.

=== Personal life ===
She married the Kuwaiti TV presenter Bassam Al-Othman and had one daughter with him, Dalia. After the divorce, she remarried and had three sons with her second husband, namely Ali, Majid, and Wahib.

== Work ==
=== Television series ===
Filmography
Year	Series	Role		
1984	ناس من زجاج			
1990	البيت الكبير			
1991	آه منك			
1991	أيام العمر			
1992	Elal Saber			
1994	Sons of Abu Jassim	Zainab Umm Salman		
1997	Hawazi Al-Dar	several roles		
1997	بحر الحكايات	several roles		
1997	الحاسة السادسة			
1997	Ahlam Dayiea			
1997	الجحود			
1998	تالي العمر	Umm Jassim		
1998	As the Days Turn			
1999	Ghanawi Al-Murthafa	several roles		
1999	Suspicion Paths			
1999	آخر الرجال	Umm Ahmad		
2000	Tash ma Tash 8, episode: "ليالي منفوحة"			
2000	Ayal Al-Deeb			
2000	Niran	Halima		
2000	Shokran Ya			
2000	أضحك ولا أبكي			
2000	Matbat			
2001	عائلة خاصة جدا			
2001	Al-Qadr Al-Makhtum			
2001	Good Citizen	Umm Abdullah		
2002	Ashouq			
2002	Khalaf Khalaf 2			
2002	Watabaqaa Al-Judhur			
2003	بيت بو نشمي			
2003	Men’s Tears			
2003	ملاذ الطير			
2003	Malaz Al-Tayer			
2003	أخوة الشر			
2003	Khalati Wa Eimti			
2003	Rehlat Bou Bilal			
2004	Mal Wa Ahlam			
2004	Sawalif Harim			
2004	Ghasaat Al-Haniyn			
2004	Map of Umm Rakan			
2004	Zamani Ealaa Kayfi			
2004	مثلك عارف			
2005	من طق طبله			
2005	دار الزين			
2005	Sawhat Zaman			
2005	You Are Happy and Blessed	Hanan/Wael		
2005	Doroub	Mounira		
2005	Alghurub Al-Akhir			
2005	Dawalab Al-Zaman			
2006	Jaddah 7			
2006	Habl Almawada	Shumukh		
2006	Sniper			
2006	Alraha			
2006	Abu Shalaakh Al-Burmayi			
2006	خال الحكم			
2006	وجوه من شمع			
2007	Oh-Yamal			
2007	تسونامي			
2007	فواصل			
2007	Me, You, and the Internet			
2007	4x4			
2007	Ammouna's Diary			
2007	The Liberals			
2008	Between Two Eras			
2008	Dar Alzaman			
2008	Wall of Silence			
2008	Eyal Bou Salam			
2008	Al-Dayah			
2008	Haretna Sweet			
2008-2009	Al-Sakinat Fi Qulubina			
2008	الخطابة			
2009	بيت صالح السكراب			
2009	Um Saa'f Jatkum (sitcom)	Umm Duei		
2009	Children of Bahr			
2009	Awanis City			
2009	Damat Yatem			
2009	Colonel Shamma			
2010	Awraq Al-Hob			
2010	Al-Balshty			
2010-2011	Sakattum Bakattum			
2010	Qissat Hawana			
2010	Wish Wisha			
2010	Cheques			
2011	Glowing Candles			
2011	Tamasha			
2011	Bou Karim, The Caretaker of Seven Women			
2011	Eladid			
2012	Between Past and Love			
2012	Impossible Love			
2012	When the Camel Falls			
2012	Regal Wust el Hareem	Umm Mubarak		
2012-2013	Loulou Morjan	Loulou Morjan		
2012	Khademat El Kawm			
2013	Souq el Hareem	Suad		
2013-2014	Wadima and Halima	Wadima		
2014	Khamis ben Joma'a			
2014	Hawajis			
2015	Tora Bora	|-	2015	''Banat Al-Rawda
2015	Shamsan’s Children			
2016	Harim Aboy Badria			
2016	Fairy Tales from the Gulf	several roles		
2016-2018	Family War	Suad		
2016	Original State			
2017	Simple Life			
2019	Azraa			
2019	Matha Law?	Example		
2019	Jadimak Nadimik	Umm Tarek		
2020	Um Harun			

=== Theatre ===
Acting career
Year	Play
1999	Kulk Nazar
2000	Zakaria Habibi
2009	انفلونزا الهوامير
2010	حريمكو
2010	عيال سعادة
2011	إحنا عيالها
2012	Where Did He Utter It?
2012	Fun Run Family
2016	Khafif Khafif
2017	ترانزيت
2018	البيت بيت أبونا
2018	أخوان أم فهد

=== Film ===
Filmography
Year	Film
1990	The Barrier
2004	Shabab Cool
2007	Arbaa Banat

=== TV movies ===
Filmography
Year	TV movie
1989	كذبة بأربعة أرجل
1990	أنا وشقيقي
1992	حلاب الذر
1997	آه يا سلمان

=== Variety hosting ===
In 2012, she hosted the show خارج اللعبة on Sama Dubai.
