= Khaled Al Shaer =

Bahraini journalist

- خالد الشاعر
- Born: 30 December 1987 (age 38); Muharraq, Bahrain
- Education: University of Bahrain
- Occupations: TV presenter, actor
- Spouse(s): Aseel Omran (m. 2008; div. 2016) Noor el-Sheikh (m. 2018)
- Children: 1 (deceased)

Khaled Al Shaer (Arabic: خالد الشاعر; born 20 December 1987) is a Bahraini journalist.

== Biography ==
Al Shaer studied at the Department of Communication and Multimedia of the University of Bahrain, hosted نجوم الظهاري (Stars of Al-Dhahari) and هوى الديرة (Hawi Al-Deera) on Bahrain Radio, and hosted some episodes of Sawalif on the satellite channel Wanasah, a sister network of MBC. He also appeared on the reality show Hiya Wa Huwa with his then-wife, Saudi pop singer Aseel Omran. Al Shaer also participated in government ceremonies and acted in several works. In 2014, he appeared on the Saudi version of the impression show Your Face Sounds Familiar, competing for charity on behalf of the Sanad Children's Cancer Support Society.

=== Personal life ===
Al Shaer married Omran on 8 August 2008, but separated in 2012, reconciled in 2015, but finally divorced in 2016. Their son Walid died at an early age. On 18 July 2018, he married journalist Noor el-Sheikh, daughter of Bahraini singer Khaled El Sheikh.

=== Acting career ===
Filmography
Year	Production (series unless otherwise indicated)
	أنا والحكومة (The Government and I, play)
1999	هو وغيره
2001	قسمتي ونصيبي
2002	أرنب وعقرب وفيل (Rabbit, Scorpion, and Elephant, play)
2003	اللحن المفقود
2004	Qeshta Yaba (film)
2008	الأقزام قادمون (film)
2008	Cafe Chino
2018	Al Khataya Al Ashr
2019	Dofa'at Alqahera
2019	W Ma Adrak Ma Omi
2020	Wa Ka'ana Shay'an Lam Yakon
2020	Dofa’at Beirut
