= Mary's Daughter (movie) =

- بنت مريم
- Directed by: Saeed Salmeen Al-Murry
- Written by: Mohahammed Hassan Ahmed
- Screenplay by: Mohahammed Hassan Ahmed
- Starring: Rasha Al-Obaidi; Mohammed Ismael; Hussain Mahmoud; Donia Zein
- Edited by: Taha Al-Ajmi
- Production company: The cinematic vision of artistic production
- Release date: 2008
- Running time: 27 minutes
- Country: Emirates
- Language: Arabic

Mary's Daughter (Bint Maryam) is an Emirate short drama film, released in 2008. It was written by Mohammed Hassan Ahmed and directed by Saeed Salmeen Al-Murry. The film has screened in numerous film festival and won several awards.

== Plot ==
With every raindrop, the story will grow- and be told by Mary's daughter, a young girl whose story take a place when she leaves her home after the death of her husband, the sixty years old man. She leave her home only to move closer to a faces that hold sorrow and silence. We came to realize that in every heart and house or a neighborhood, there exists a girl who resembles (Bint Maryam), girls who share the same circumstances as Mary's daughter. After her husband's death, The girl is forced to leave her neighborhood (فريج) to move to another one, unfamiliar place, where her last relative, Matooq, who's a blind person lives in. In a place which is like an open prison, Mary's daughter faces a new form of suffering. She lives under the control of the blind man, serving him while surrounded by fear and emotional coldness that define the place and the people around her. In her new world, she meets a child who is holding a dried lemon plant all the time, clinging to the hope it will one day turn green and grow so his mother may live. She also encounter another woman, who is suffering from the male dominance, embodied by her brother, where he confides in her in a dilapidated room. Despite her dream of turning back time to the innocence of childhood and her desire to free both the child and the woman from illusion of the traditions and the prison of social customs, she is confronted with the barriers and walls she cannot overcome. So her dream become tied to the rain, something she clinging to, where her desperate attempt to escape her suppressed desires. The film present a critical social perspective on a reality of children marriage and childhood crisis in some Arab regions.

== Cast ==
In the Mary's Daughter film, a group of actors were included, some of them were:

- Rasha Al-Obaidi
- Mohammed Ismael
- Hussain Mahmoud
- Donia Zein

== Awards ==
The Emirate film won around 13 artistic awards in Arabic and international festivals, including:

1. Best short feature film Award at the Messina festival in Italy, 2008.
2. Silver Award at the Gulf Cinema Festival (2008).
3. Silver Hawk award at the Cinema in Rotterdam (2008).
4. Bronze Banoush Award at Cinema in the Kingdom of Bahrain (2008).
5. Best Arab Film Award at Jordan International Film Festival (2008).
6. Special Jury Prize at the Dubai International Film Festival (2008).
7. Best Emirati Director Award for the film "Mary's Daughter" at the Dubai International Film Festival (2008).
8. Grand Prize, Short Cinema Festival,Casablanca (2009).
9. Grand Prize for Best feature Short Film about the Environment of the Western Region (2009).
10. Gold Award, Al-Hurruban International Cinema Festival, Iraq (2009).
11. Gold Award at the International Cinema Festival, held its first edition in Amarah, Maysan Governorate, southern Iraq (2009).
12. The Abdul Hameed Shoman Grand Prize for Best Arab Film, at the Jordan Short Film Festival.

== See also ==
- List of films produced in the United Arab Emirates
