= Masquerades (film) =

- Directed by: Lyes Salem
- Screenplay by: Lyes Salem, Nathalie Saugeon
- Produced by: Dharamsala
- Starring: Lyes Salem, Sarah Reguieg, Mohamed Bouchaïb, Rym Takoucht
- Cinematography: Pierre Cottereau
- Edited by: Florence Ricard
- Music by: Mathias Duplessy
- Release date: 2008
- Running time: 92'
- Countries: Algeria; France

Masquerades (Arabic: مسخرة, romanized: Maskhara) is a 2008 Algerian-French film directed by Lyes Salem.

== Synopsis ==
A village in Algiers. Proud and a bluffer, Mounir wishes to be admired by all, but he has a weakness: His sister, Rym, who falls asleep anywhere. One night on the way back from the city, and quite inebriated, he shouts out to all and sunder that a rich businessman has asked for his sister's hand. By the next morning, he's the envy of all. Trapped by his own lie, Mounir changes his family's destiny.

== Cast ==
- Mounir (Lyes Salem) - Habiba's husband, and Rym's older brother
- Rym (Sarah Reguieg) - Mounir's sister and object of Khliffa's affection
- Khliffa (Mohamed Bouchaïb) - Mounir's best friend, in love with Rym
- Habiba (Rym Takoucht) - Mounir's wife
- Amine (Merouane Zmirli) - Mounir and Habiba's boy
- Rédouane Lamouchi (Mourad Khan) - businessman and conman
- Lydia Larini

== Production ==
Masquerades is an Algerian-French co-production, directed by Lyes Salem.

== Awards ==
- Fespaco 2009 (Burkina Faso)
- Festival Francophone de Namur 2008 (Belgium)
- Festival Francophone d’Angoulême 2008 (France)
- Dubai International Film Festival 2008
