= Mohamed Bouchaïb =

Algerian actor (born 1984)

- Born: 17 July 1984
- Citizenship: Libya
- Occupation: Actor
- Awards: Lumière Award for Most Promising Actor for Mascarades

Mohamed Bouchaïb (Arabic: محمد بوشعيب; 17 July 1984) is an Libya-born and Algerian actor.

He is best known for his role in Mascarades directed by Lyes Salem. Bouchaïb won the Lumière Award for Most Promising Actor for his work in Mascarades.

== Life and career ==
Mohamed Bouchaïb met Biyouna and fr:Salah Aougrout when he was 19-years-old, providing the introduction to a role in the popular Algerian TV sitcom Nass Mlah City (Arabic:ناس ملاح) directed by Djafaar Gassem. It was thanks to this first sitcom, which was widely watched, that he became popular with the Algerian public. He went on to lead an artist's life, multiplying his projects.

In 2007, the Académie des Lumières awarded him the Best Male Talent prize for his role as Khelifa in his first feature film.

== Filmography ==
=== Film ===
- Mascarades (2007) film
- Le Dernier Passager (2009) 7 minutes - main role - directed Mounès Khemar 2010 was awarded at Cannes Film Festival, and participated in the 14th Guanajuato film festival.
- La cité des Vieux (2010) 30 minutes - main role - directed Yahia Mouzaheme

=== TV ===
- Zraa' Yenbet (2005)
- El Fhama (2005-2007) Canal Algérie
- Djemai Family 1 (2008)
- Djemai Family 2 (2009)
- Nass Mlah City (2005/6) Canal Algérie
- Saad El Gat 1 (2010) Canal Algérie
- Saad El Gat 2 (2011)
- Djemai Family 3 (2011) Canal Algérie

== Awards and nomination ==
- 2009: Lumière Award for Most Promising Actor for Mascarades
