= La Vie d'après =

- الحياة ما بعد
- Directed by: Anis Djaad
- Written by: Anis Djaad
- Produced by: MAD Distribution; Meditalents (co-production)
- Starring: Lydia Larini; Ahmed Belmoumane; Ali Damiche; Samir El Hakim
- Production companies: MAD Distribution; Meditalents
- Release date: 2021
- Running time: 105 minutes
- Countries: Algeria; France
- Language: Arabic

La Vie d'après (in Arabic, ‘الحياة ما بعد’) is a 2021 French-Algerian drama film directed by Anis Djaad.

It is the director's first feature film, produced as an Algerian-French co-production and screened at festivals and in cinemas between 2021 and 2022.

== Synopsis ==
A malicious rumour spreads through a village in western Algeria about Hadjer, a widow raising her teenage son, Djamil, on her own. Unable to bear the gossip and pressure, Hadjer flees the village with her son to try to rebuild their lives in the city. There, faced with precariousness, desire and violence, mother and son must survive the personal and social transformations that their choices bring about.

== Technical details ==
Source :

- Director: Anis Djaad
- Screenplay: Anis Djaad
- Country of origin: Algeria, France
- Genre: Drama
- Running time: 105 minutes
- Year: 2021

== Cast ==
Source :

- Lydia Larini: Hadjer
- Ahmed Belmoumane
- Ali Damiche
- Samir El Hakim
- Djemel Barek

== Production ==
Director Anis Djaâd, a former journalist and author of short films and novels, developed the project with the support of development organisations (Meditalents). The main filming took place in the Mostaganem region and its surroundings; Djaad stated in an interview that filming had been completed shortly before the widespread implementation of pandemic-related health measures, but that post-production.

== Festival selections and awards ==
- Special mention — 41st Amiens International Film Festival (2021).
- Tanit for first feature film (or equivalent mention) — Carthage Film Festival (JCC): the film was awarded and distinguished at the JCC.
- Selected for the Luxor African Film Festival and other African and Mediterranean festivals.

== Critical reception ==
The film received mixed reviews, but overall it was recognised for its artistic value and contribution to Algerian cinema.

- The daily newspaper Liberté Algérie published an article emphasising that La vie d'après illustrates a revival of Algerian cinema, highlighting its realistic approach and its treatment of sensitive social issues such as precariousness, the status of women and the impact of rumours on society.
- The cultural newspaper El Watan, for its part, emphasised the psychological depth of the characters, particularly the role of Hadjer played by Lydia Larini, while noting that the direction favoured slowness and introspection over a traditional narrative.
- Reporters.dz described the film as a ‘necessary work’, highlighting its courage in exposing social taboos and its refined aesthetic, which showcases the natural scenery of Algiers and its surroundings.
- On film review platforms such as SensCritique and Allociné, however, some users expressed reservations: they noted a tendency towards slowness and long shots which, in their opinion, sometimes detract from the narrative rhythm, although this approach was defended by others as a hallmark of Anis Djaad's style.

== Controversies ==
The film tackles sensitive topics (rumours, acculturation, violence against women, memories of the dark decade) that have sparked debate in certain press articles and among viewers — the narrative angle and treatment of collective trauma have sometimes been questioned.

== See also ==
- List of Algerian films
- Anis Djaad
- Algerian cinema
