= Tomorrow, Algiers? =

- Directed by: Amin Sidi-Boumédiène
- Screenplay by: Amin Sidi-Boumédiène
- Produced by: Thala Films Production
- Starring: Nabil Asli; Houssam Herzallah; Amine Mensteur; Mehdi Ramdani; Mohamed Guechoud; Aida Guechoud
- Edited by: Amin Sidi-Boumédiène
- Music by: Amin Sidi-Boumédiène
- Release date: 2011
- Running time: 20 minutes
- Country: Algeria
- Language: Arab

Tomorrow, Algiers? (French: Demain, Alger?) is a 2011 Algerian film directed by Amin Sidi-Boumédiène.

== Plot ==
Four young Algerians faced with a choice which one way or another will mark their lives forever: leave for Europe or protest in the streets. One of them will leave for Europe, he knows that he is leaving his country, perhaps for good, and will not see his friends again; the others will join the protests. It looks like last year's Arab revolutions, but in fact the film refers to the eve of another great popular uprising, the one in Algeria in 1992.

== Awards ==
The film won the Best Producer from the Arab World at Abu Dhabi Film Festival 2011.
