= Yasmine (film) =

Bruneian martial arts film

- Poster
- Directed by: Siti Kamaluddin
- Screenplay by: Salman Aristo
- Produced by: Khairuddin Kamaluddin
- Starring: Liyana Yus; Nadiah Wahid; Arifin Putra; Aryl Falak; Reza Rahadian; Carmen Soo; Dian P. Ramlee; Nabila Huda; Roy Sungkono; Agus Kuncoro; Mentari De Marelle; M. Nasir; Jazz Hayat; Lim Ching Miau; Soo Wincci; Maharasyi
- Cinematography: James Teh
- Edited by: Cesa David Luckmansyah
- Music by: Aghi Narottama
- Production company: Origin Films
- Distributed by: Shaw Organisation
- Release date: 16 August 2014
- Running time: 109 minutes
- Country: Brunei
- Languages: Malay, English
- Budget: US$2 million

Yasmine is a 2014 Bruneian teen drama martial arts film directed by Siti Kamaluddin and written by Indonesian veteran writer Salman Aristo.

Set in modern Brunei, it tells the story of a local schoolgirl who learns the local martial art of silat. It was only the third feature film made in Brunei.

== Plot ==
Bruneian high-schooler Yasmine (Liyana Yus) has decidedly had enough of her school and strict father and seeks to finally perfect the art of Silat, a martial art native to Southeast Asia after meeting a boy in school who has given a demonstration of his own Silat knowledge out of a desire to impress him. Although initially excited about learning the skills required to be a master, she soon grows unmotivated after her school's Silat club is shown to be rather incompetent, being led by a teacher who clearly knows nothing about Silat and has very few students in the club. Luckily, she does meet a few of her classmates, Nadia and Ali, who also join the club with her to achieve their respective goals.

Because their teacher is incapable of actually guiding them in the art of Silat, the trio go on a hunt to find a cigku (Silat master) who is willing to train them. After a little while, they find themselves in a Silat gym whereupon Yasmine's main rival, Dewi (Mentari de Marelle), is officially introduced. Dewi mocks Yasmine and her friends for their so-called "desperation" on their quest to find a teacher, and when Yasmine argues back it is revealed that their current master is Dewi's father, explaining Dewi's poor attitude. A disheartened Yasmine returns home and receives a lecture from her father about the dangers of Silat, therefore Yasmine has to figure out a way to learn it behind his back. The next day, a friend of her father encourages him to look deeper into the topic of parenting and perhaps even be more open-minded about Yasmine's interests, but he dismisses him.

The movie then cuts to a scene where Yasmine spots Dewi training with the boy at the Silat promotion much to her displeasure, and thus she realizes the two's rivalry is for more than just martial arts.

On yet another quest to find a skillful pesilat, the group stumbles upon a master in the neighborhood who they see as capable to teach them. However, he is handicapped, and cannot provide a real example of the essential skills they need. But with rigorous training and methods, the group manage to boast a decent amount of Silat expertise. They deftly escape getting caught by Yasmine's father by pretending to be studying their school subjects, when in reality they're learning Silat techniques off of paper.

On the day of a Silat pep-rally, Yasmine's team as well as others from the district's schools show off what they've learned. When Yasmine spots her apparent friends from her other school making fun of Nadia's anxiety, she is upset and somewhat disgusted by their behavior. A worried Yasmine immediately chases after her.

== Production ==
Liyana Yus took a year of kuntao and silat training. Hong Kong choreographer Man-Ching Chan directed the action scenes. The film had a budget of $2 million, of which $120,000 was provided by the Brunei Economic Development Board, who saw an opportunity for future location filming in the country's jungles and mangrove swamps.

== Release ==
Yasmine had its world premiere at the 2014 Shanghai International Film Festival; it also showed at the 2014 Neuchâtel International Fantastic Film Festival, at which it won the Best Asian Film prize. It went on general release in August of that year. In Japan it was renamed Dragon Girl.

== Reception ==
On Kung-fu Kingdom, Brad Curran praised Yus' performance, saying "With so many 'first timers' on its shoulders, including being Brunei's first martial arts film, 'Yasmine' succeeds with the same tenacity and single-minded determination embodied by its lead character."

The Straits Times awarded it two and a half stars, saying "The bouts are short and the action crisp, with a welcome absence of wire-work or over-the-top acrobatics. Structurally, everything in this coming-of-age story chugs along in an entertaining way, though hampered by preachiness about family values and the power of silat."

Writing in Seen and Unseen: Visual Cultures of Imperialism, D. Bruno Starrs wrote on the conflict between the film's portrayal of Brunei girlhood and the dominant philosophy of Melayu Islam Beraja.
