= Honey Cigar =

2020 film

- Directed by: Kamir Aïnouz
- Screenplay by: Kamir Aïnouz; Marc Syrigas
- Produced by: Christine Rouxel; Marie-Castille Mention-Schaar
- Cinematography: Jeanne Lapoirie
- Edited by: Albertine Lastera
- Music by: Julie Roué
- Release date: 2020
- Language: French

Honey Cigar (French: Cigare au miel) is a 2020 coming-of-age drama film co-written and directed by Kamir Aïnouz, at her feature film debut.

A co-production between France, Belgium and Algeria, the film premiered at the 77th edition of the Venice Film Festival.

== Cast ==
- Zoé Adjani as Selma
- Amira Casar as Selma's mother
- Lyes Salem as Selma's father
- Louis Peres as Julien
- Idir Chender as Luka Toumi
- Axel Granberger as William
- Jud Bengana as Sélim
- Rym Takoucht as Hafida Benslimane

== Production ==
The film was produced by Christine Rouxel and Marie-Castille Mention-Schaar, with Dardenne brothers, Malek Ali-Yahia and Dany Boon serving as co-producers.

== Release ==
The film premiered at the 77th Venice International Film Festival, in the Giornate degli Autori sidebar.

== Reception ==
On the review aggregator website Rotten Tomatoes, 67% of 6 critics' reviews are positive. Screen International film critic Sarah Ward wrote: "Honey Cigar should earn a continued audience; films about the female teenage experience are no longer rare, but Aïnouz’s addition to the genre proves not only astute and thoughtful, but also engaging."
