= Noor el-Sheikh =

Bahraini broadcaster and actress (born 1987)

- نور الشيخ
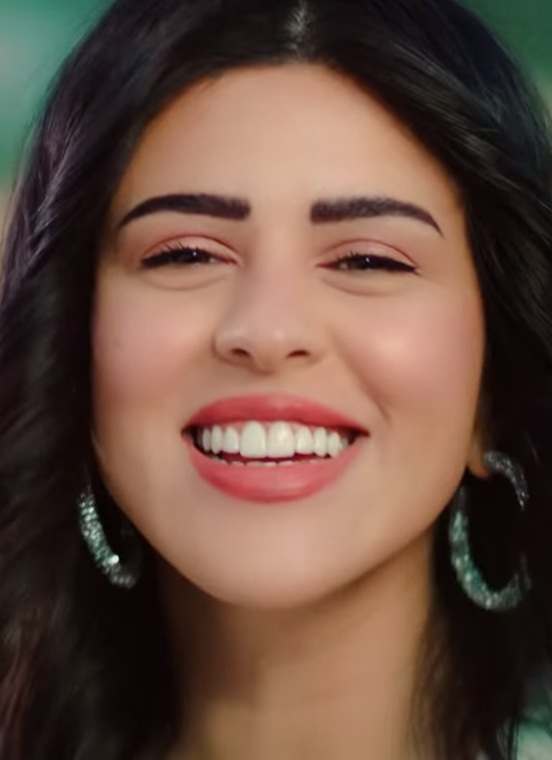
- Noor el-Sheikh as she appeared in a 2018 Bahraini Independence Day Music video
- Born: Noor Khaled Sheikh; April 3, 1987 (age 37)
- Education: Bahrain Bayan School
- Alma mater: University of Manchester
- Occupation(s): broadcaster, actress
- Years active: 2010—Present
- Spouse: Khaled Al Shaer (m. 2018)
- Father: Khaled El Sheikh

Noor el-Sheikh (Arabic: نور الشيخ, born April 3, 1987) is a Bahraini broadcaster and actress.

== Biography ==
Her father is the Bahraini singer, Khaled El Sheikh, and she has five sisters, Lama, Darren, Marwa, Samawa, and Ness. She holds a Bachelor of Arts degree in International Fashion Marketing from the University of Manchester. After graduation, she worked at a British fashion and cosmetics company.

== Personal life ==
In July 2018, El-Sheikh married Bahraini media personality Khaled Al Shaer.

== Career ==
El-Sheikh began her media career when the producers of Hala Bahrain, the morning show on Bahrain TV produced by Charisma Group, hired her to film a report on thrifty shopping at trendy boutiques in 2010. Afterwards, Bilal al-Arabi, then the show's main editor, invited her to join the reporting team, for which she regularly contributed and appeared three times a week as a fashion critic. After a year, the contract with Charisma was severed, but Bahrain TV asked her to take over as host, which she accepted immediately. She completed a course with veteran journalist Ghassan bin Jiddo at the Al-Jazeera media training center, then co-hosted a show for two episodes on Kuwait’s Al-Watan TV station with Bader Mohamed. She made her acting debut in the 2018 series El-Khtaya El-Ashr.

== Filmography ==
=== Television series ===
Filmography
Year	Series	Role
2018	El-Khtaya El-Ashr	Buthaina
2019	Dofaat Al Qahera	Lolwah
2019	W Ma Adrak Ma Omi	Hala
2020	Ka'anna Shay'an Lam Yakon	Tamadur
2020	Dofaat Beirut	Latifa/Fethiye
2021	margrat	Rowdah
2022	From El Haram Street to	Fay

=== Unscripted programs ===
TV hosting
Year	Broadcaster	Show
2010	Bahrain TV	Hala Bahrain
2011	Dubai TV	Gulf Star
2018	Dubai TV	Me Style
