= Siti Kamaluddin =

Bruneian filmmaker and musician

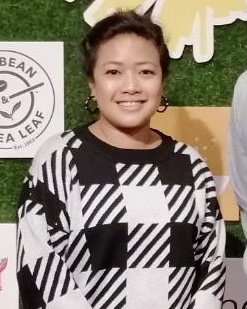
- Born: 1 December 1979 (age 46); Bandar Seri Begawan, Brunei
- Education: Downe House School; University of Southampton
- Occupation: Director

Siti Kamaluddin is a Bruneian filmmaker, director, and musician. She was listed as one of the 50 most influential women Brunei in 2014. She began her career as a writer and TV host in Brunei Darussalam and later started directing and producing for on TV shows.

== Early life ==
Siti Kamaluddin was born on 1 December 1979 in Bandar Seri Begawan. After graduating high school at Downe House School in the UK, she proceeded to study chemistry at the University of Southampton. However, she realised that her passion for films surpasses her love for Chemistry and decided to venture into the film industry. Siti began her entertainment career on screen- as a TV Host for Orange room.

== Career ==
Siti then set up Origin Artistic Management, the leading production company in Brunei, where she produced and directed TV Commercials and documentaries for some of Brunei's largest corporate clients. Siti Kamaluddin has also received the Special Award for Outstanding Contribution to the Music Industry from her earlier works.

She later directed her film Mentari where six directors from ASEAN countries made an anthology of film to celebrate International Women's Day 2014]. The film was released just shortly before the release of her film Yasmine - Siti Kamaluddin's debut feature film and Brunei Darussalam's First International Feature Film.

Yasmine also won Best Asian Film at the Neuchatel International Fantastic Film Festival in 2014. It has also been competing in numerous film festivals worldwide including the Asia Pacific Screen Awards, Fantastic Film Festival, Puchon International Fantastic Film Festival and Hawaii International Film Festival (NETPAC Awards).

After a successful start with Yasmine, Siti Kamaluddin started the Brunei Film Blitz in 2017 with the hopes of introducing the Bruneian audience to World Cinema. In 2018, she directed her second feature film 'Hari Minggu Yanng Ke-Empat', a drama-comedy for Eid al-Fitr. The film receives the Special Jury Award at the ASEAN International Film Festival and Awards (AIFFA) and the Special Jury Award at the 59th Asia Pacific Film Festival in Macau.

In 2020, Siti Kamaluddin released her third feature film 'Akademi' which is a hit at the Brunei Box Office.

== Filmography ==
Films
Year	Title
2014	Mentari
2014	Yasmine
2018	Hari Minggu Yang Ke-Empat
2020	Akademi

TV Commercials
Year	Title
2008	Lihat Nada Short Film
2011	DST Rebranding Projection Mapping
2014	Royal Brunei 40th Anniversary Video
2014	Royal Brunei Dreamliner Safety Video
2015	TelBru National Day TVC
2015	Progresif Cellelular Brand Video
2016	Royal Brunei Airbus Safety Video
2016	Takaful Brunei TVC
2016	Baiduri Bank TVC
2017	Autoriti Monetari Brunei Darussalam Corporate Video
2017	Takaful Brunei TVC
2017	Jollibee 30 Years TVC
2018	Jollisavers
2018	Ministry of Communications Road Safety Video
2019	BIBD Lighten Up TVC

Event Directing
Year	Title
2015	Royal Brunei 40th Anniversary Gala Dinner
2015	His Majesty the Sultan of Brunei's 69th Birthday Field Performance
2016	TelBru 10th Anniversary Gala Dinner
2016	Progresif Show for His Majesty the Sultan of Brunei's 70th Birthday
2017	1st Brunei Film Blitz
2018	2nd Brunei Film Blitz
2019	3rd Brunei Film Blitz

Screenwriting
Year	Title
2004	Orange Room
2005	Paspot to Fame
2007	Gramophone
2018	Hari Minggu Yang Ke-Empat
2020	Akademi
