= Nujoom Al-Ghanem =

Emirati poet, artist and film director (born 1962)

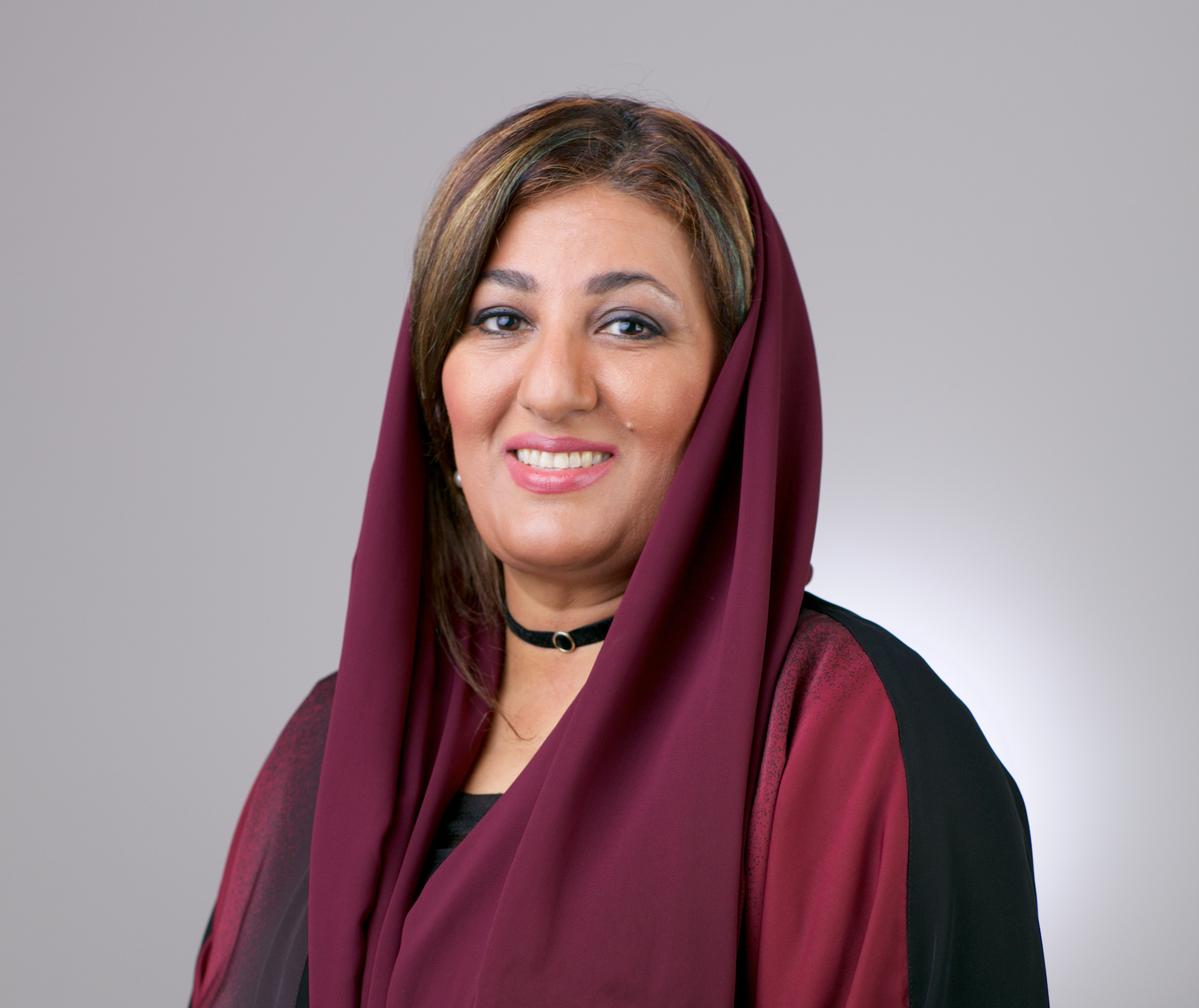
- Born: 24 October 1962 (age 63)
- Education: Ohio University, Griffith University
- Occupations: poet, film director

Nujoom Alghanem (Arabic: نجوم الغانم) (born 24 October 1962) is an Emirati poet, artist and film director. She has published eight poetry collections and has directed more than twenty films. Alghanem is active in her community and is considered a well established writer and filmmaker in the Arab world. Her achievements in the arts have been recognized both nationally and internationally. She is the cofounder of Nahar Productions, a film production company based in Dubai. Currently she works as a professional mentor in filmmaking and creative writing, as well as a cultural and media consultant.

She was one of the founding members of the Emirates Writers' Union in 1984 and used to be a board member of Abu Dhabi Authority for Culture and Heritage. In 2019, she was the solo artist of the UAE National Pavilion at the Venice Biennale. Additionally, along with four other artists, she took part in the UAE National Pavilion in 2017. She is the recipient of the Pride of the UAE Medal through the Mohammed bin Rashid Government Excellence Award in 2018.

== Early life and education ==
Alghanem was born in Dubai in the United Arab Emirates and was raised there, being the fourth child out of eleven siblings. As a young adult, she enjoyed reading about mysticism, theology, philosophy, and poetry. Later on, she was able to get access to her reading through the Sharjah International Book Fair. Arabic poetry inspired her when she was a girl, later causing her to write her own poetry. She also enjoyed painting because her aunt was a painter, as well as a photographer. Before her professional writing career, her work was published in local newspapers and magazines. After her high school graduation, Alghanem decided that she wanted to attend a university in London. Although her father supported her pursuit of the arts, he did not want her to be alone in a different country.

After completing one semester at United Arab Emirates University in Al Ain, she became tired of the nature of university life in Al Ain, so she decided to go back to working full-time. She said of her schooling, "I felt like I couldn't breathe. I didn't like life in a dormitory. Every time I was in my dorm I thought of ways to escape." Later, she became the Head of Culture and Art Department For Dubai and Northern Emirates. In terms of work experience, Alghanem started her professional career early in 1980 when she worked as a journalist for more than ten years. After getting married, becoming a mother, and starting a career as a journalist, Alghanem decided to travel to Ohio to study with her husband. She received a bachelor's degree in Video Production from Ohio University in 1996 and later received a master's degree in Film Production from Griffith University in Australia in 1999. Alghanem said, "Opportunities are not free. You have always to work hard. You have to read, to teach yourself, to learn about the world and to be very sensible about what you publish".

== Poetry ==
Alghanem has published the following eight poetry collections:

1. Masaa Al-Janah (Evening of Heaven), 1989.
2. Al-Jarair (The Consequences), 1991.
3. Rawahel (Journeyings), 1996.
4. Manazel Al-Jilnaar (Homes of Pomegranate Blossoms), 2000.
5. La Wasf Lima Ana Feeh (No Description for What I Am In), 2005.
6. Malaikat Al-Ashwaaq Al-Baeeda (Angels of Distant Longing), 2008.
7. Laylon Thaqeelon 3la Alayel (A Heavy Night on the Night), 2010.
8. Asqoto fi Nafsi (I Fall into Myself), 2012.

Masa’a Al Jannah (The Night of Heaven) was Alghanem's first book of poetry, which was published in 1989. The Night of Heaven presented her to the Arab world as a professional writer.

Alghanem was inspired by other Arab poets such as the Syrian poet, Saniyah Saleh the Lebanese poet, Nadia Tueni, the Palestinian poet Mahmoud Darwish, the Syrian poet, Nizar Qabbani, the Iraqi poet Badr Shakir al-Sayyab. She said, "The majority of poets in our world are male, but quantity does not mean quality". There are recurring themes in her poetry including longing, solitude, death, human suffering, loss and the hardships that one goes through each day. She is on the board of the International Prize for Arabic Fiction and is a regular participant in the Emirates Airline Festival of Literature. In 2019 she was a contributor to A New Divan: A Lyrical Dialogue Between East and West (Gingko Library).

== Films ==
1. "Ice Cream", 1997, short fiction.
2. "The Park", 1997, short fiction.
3. "Between Two Banks", 1999, short documentary.
4. "Al Mureed", 2008, feature documentary.
5. "Hamama", 2010, feature documentary.
6. "Amal", 2011, feature documentary.
7. "Salma's Dinner", 2011, short fiction.
8. "Red, Blue, Yellow", 2013, feature documentary.
9. "The Young Fighter", 2013, short documentary.
10. "Sounds of the Sea", 2015, feature documentary.
11. "Nearby Sky", 2015, feature documentary.
12. "Dancing with Shadows", 2016, short experimentational film.
13. "Honey, Rain, & Dust", 2016–2017, feature documentary.
14. "Sharp Tools", 2017, feature documentary.
15. "Writer's Room", 2018, video art.
16. "Rain on my Skin", 2018, video art.
17. "Forest Under the Sea", 2018, video art.
18. "Passage", 2019, video art.

Alghanem's 2015 film Nearby Sky is a documentary about Fatima Ali Alhameli, the first Emirati women to have her camels be a part of local auctions and beauty pageants. According to Alghanem, it was simple to convince Alhameli to join the film project. Both Nearby Sky and her earlier film Sounds Of The Sea have to do with an aging generation being nostalgic about their past. Nearby Sky won Best Non-Fiction Film at the Eleventh Dubai International Film Festival. The films Sounds of the Sea, The Young Fighter, and Amal and Hamama have also won awards. Her films have won local, regional, and international awards. Her films are based on people's lives and their emotions, but she is more focused on women as both characters and subjects. Alghanem said, "People greatly inspire me: their world, stories, frustrations, hesitation, confusion, sadness, happiness, pain, passion" and "I search for those characters, learn about them and from them; I live with them and always try to enter their unknown world, explore the unspoken and find out about their special moments." She believes that film-making is a passion that brings change to society.

She is a film consultant and film instructor for United Arab Emirates organizations and institutions, as well as a cultural consultant.

== Film Awards ==
Sharp Tools:

- Award of Outstanding Excellence: Original Score, Docs Without Borders Film Festival, DE, US, 2018.
- Award of Outstanding Excellence: Editing, Docs Without Borders Film Festival, DE, US, 2018.
- Award of Outstanding Excellence: Viewer Impact: Motivational/Inspirational, Docs Without Borders Film Festival, DE, US, 2018.
- Best Feature Documentary of April, Los Angeles Film Awards, 2018.
- Best Experimental Feature Documentary, Portoviejo Film Festival, Ecuador, 2018.
- Special Mention, Oran International Arabic Film Festival, Oran, Algeria, 2018.
- Award of Merit, Impact Docs Awards, LA, US, 2018.
- Best Female Director, London Independent Film Awards, London, 2018.
- Best Feature Documentary, Ismailia International Film Festival, Egypt, 2018.
- Best Feature Documentary, Dubai International Film Festival, Emirati Muhr, Dubai, 2017.

Honey, Rain and Dust:

- First Prize, Al Owais Creative Award, The Cultural & Scientific Association, Dubai, 2017.

Sounds of the Sea:

- Special Jury Prize, Alexandria Mediterranean Countries Film Festival, Egypt, 2015. NEARBY SKY:
- Best Non-Fiction Film, Dubai International Film Festival, Dubai, 2014.
- Best Documentary, GCC Film Festival, Abu Dhabi, 2016.

The Young Fighter:

- Best Short Documentary, Al Owais Creative Award, The Cultural & Scientific Association, Dubai, 2014. AMAL:
- First Prize, GCC Film Festival, Kuwait, 2013.
- Special Jury Prize, from Beirut International Film Festival, 2012.
- Second Prize, Documentary Competition, Gulf Film Festival, 2012.
- First Prize, Dubai International Film Festival, 2011.

Hamama:

- Best Director, GCC Film Festival, Doha, Qatar, 2012.
- First Prize, Baghdad International Film Festival, Arab Women Directors' Competition, Baghdad, Iraq, 2011.
- First Prize, Malmo Film Festival, Sweden, 2011.
- First Prize, Gulf Film Festival, Dubai, 2011.
- Special Jury Prize, Dubai International Film Festival, 2010.

Almureed:

- Best Feature Documentary in the Gulf, Emirates Film Competition from Abu Dhabi International Film Festival, 2008.
- Most Promising UAE Film Maker, Dubai International Film Festival, 2008.
- Special Mention from Gulf Film Festival, Dubai, 2008.

== Recognitions ==
- Received the Medal for the Pride of the UAE - Mohammed bin Rashid Government Excellence Award – UAE, 2019.
- Honored by Effat University for taking an active part in the Gulf Cinema – Jeddah, Saudi Arabia, 2016.
- Won Sayidaty magazine's Award for Excellence and Innovation - 2016.
- Selected as the Personality of the Month by Emaratalyoum Newspaper – Dubai, 2015.
- Recognized with other 11 women from around the Middle East for being unstoppable - Femina Middle East magazine - 2015.
- Recognized for her distinguished role in film production in the UAE, Watani, Filmi Program - 2014.
- Recognized for her contribution in filmmaking in the Gulf Region by the GCC Film Festival – 2013, Kuwait.
- Honored by Filmi, part of Watani Al Emarat initiative, for her contribution in the film movement in the UAE - 2013.
- L’Officiel Woman of the Year Award in Literature - 2010.
- Received Rashid Award for Scientific Outstanding, 2002.
- Received Nantes Mayer's Medal on her contribution in filmmaking, the Three Continents’ Film Festival – Nantes, France, 2001.

Dr. Omnia Amin, a professor at Zayed University in Dubai, says this about Alghanem's poetry and work,"Nujoom Alghanem is one of the strongest modern Emirati poets who rose in the early 1980s in the Persian Gulf region. Her language is such that it permeates the soul with a rich and flavoured life experience that goes beyond the five senses".

Co-founder of the United Arab Emirates branch of Women in Film and Television, Michelle Nickelson, said, "Nujoom could be considered a UAE national treasure. Her films have a lovely feature style to them." Alghanem won the Best Emirati Female Filmmaker Award at the Fifth Dubai International Film Festival for her film Al Mureed.

== See also ==
- Manal bin Amr
