= Bassam Al-Thawadi =

Bahraini filmmaker (born 1960)

Bassam Al Thawadi
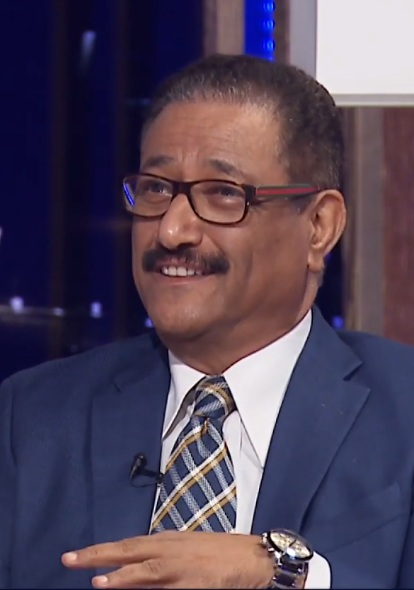
- Bassam Al-Thawadi guest of Bahrain TV, 21 September 2020
- Born: Bassam Mohammed Al-Thawadi; December 13, 1960 (age 65); Manama
- Occupation: Director
- Years active: 1974–present
- Spouse: Donya Ahmed Al Wazzan (14 March 2001 – present) Seham Hameed Sanqoor (12 December 1985 – 16 September 1986) (divorced)

Bassam Mohammed Al-Thawadi (Arabic: بسام محمد الذوادي , born December 13, 1960) is a veteran Bahraini filmmaker and film director, known for producing Bahrain's first feature film, The Barrier, in 1990. Regarded as a regional pioneer in film-making, he is a founding member of the GCC Cinema Society and is also the founder and director-in-general of first Arab Cinema Festival in Bahrain. He had directed numerous short films and also commercials, educational & cultural programmes during his tenure in the Bahrain Radio and Television Corporation as well as performing in plays.

Al-Thawadi was chairman of the Al Sawari Video Festival of 1994 and a member of the judging committee of the Baghdad International Television & Film Festival in 1988. He organized the New Egyptian Cinema Days Festival in Bahrain in 1993, and was the director of the fifth Arab Music Festival in 1996.

== Biography ==
Bassam Mohammed Al Thawadi was born in Gudaibiya in the Bahraini capital, Manama in December 1960. Bassam's father worked in nearby Saudi Arabia in the 1960s, and it was in this time that Bassam developed an interest in photography. In 1979, he studied filming at the Higher Institute of Cinema in Giza, Egypt and he graduated in 1982. During his study he directed a short drama film, Al Qina'a (translation: The Mask) shot on 16mm and his graduation project was a short drama, Malaekat Al Ardh (translation: Angels of the Earth).

He joined Bahrain TV on May 4, 1985, and had produced a variety programs for the channel. He also produced programmes which were broadcast in all Arab countries which are members of the Arab States Broadcasting Union (ASBU).

In 1990, he produced and directed the feature film The Barrier, widely considered to be the first feature film produced in Bahrain, the film has been entered into several regional and international film festivals, generally winning good reviews. In 2004, he directed and co-produced (the other producer being the Bahrain Cinema Company) the film Visitor, considered to be the second feature film produced in Bahrain and first Dolby sound system in the Persian Gulf. Between those two films he directed many documentary films. In 2006 he directed A Bahraini Tale, the third feature film produced in Bahrain and first DTS sound system in the Persian Gulf region. The movie was critically acclaimed by local and international critics.

He currently works as the head of the drama and documentary section at Bahrain Radio and Television Corporation, at Bahrain's Ministry of Information.

== Filmography ==
Year	Title	Director	Producer	Writer	Actor	Notes
1990	The Barrier	Yes	Yes			well received and screened at several film festivals worldwide
2004	Visitor	Yes	Yes	Yes	Yes	widely acknowledged as being Bahrain's second feature film
2006	A Bahraini Tale	Yes	Yes			described as an epic drama, this movie is set during the Six-Day War, and revolves around the personal story of a middle-class Bahraini family and around the hopes & faith of the Arab world had in Gamal Abdel Nasser, the Egyptian president. The film was critically acclaimed by critics
2008	Four Girls		Yes			
2010	Longing	Yes	Yes			

- Haneen

== Awards ==
On April 10, 2012, Al-Thawadi was awarded the Lifetime Achievement Award at the 5th Gulf Film Festival in recognition of his lifetime work in Gulf film making.
