= Anis Djaad =

Algerian film director and screenwriter (1974–2026)

Anis Djaâd
- أنيس جاد
- Born: Anis Djaâd; 29 April 1974; Algiers, Algeria
- Died: 4 March 2026 (aged 51)
- Occupations: Film director, screenwriter, writer
- Notable work: La Vie d'après (2021); Level Crossing (2014); The Porthole (2012) (see filmography)

Anis Djaâd (Arabic: أنيس جاد; 29 April 1974 – 4 March 2026) was an Algerian film director, screenwriter and writer, best known for his short films and his first feature film La Vie d'après (2021).

== Life and career ==
Anis Djaâd was born on 29 April 1974 in Algiers, where he grew up in the Bab El Oued district. He began his career in cinema as an assistant director before turning to writing and directing short films. Alongside filmmaking, he was also a novelist, having published works such as Matins parisiens and L'odeur du violon. Djaad died on 4 March 2026, at the age of 51.

== Works ==
=== Filmography ===
Year	Title	Function / Notes
2012	The Porthole	Short film – direction & screenplay
2014	Level Crossing	Short film – direction & screenplay; Best Director and Best Actor awards at the Maghreb Short Film Festival in Oujda
2016	Keltoum's Journey	Short film – Best Fiction Short Award at the Image et Vie Festival in Dakar; Best Female Role Award at the Maghreb Film Festival of Oujda
2021	The Life After	Feature film – first full-length feature by the director; selected at festivals; Special Mention at the Amiens Festival; African Critics Award at JCC
2023	The Night of Abed	Short film – direction & screenplay

== Awards ==
- Special Mention – Amiens International Film Festival for La Vie d'après
- African Critics Award – 33rd Carthage Film Festival for La Vie d'après
- Audience Award "El Kholkhal d'Or" – National Festival of Women's Literature and Cinema of Saïda for La Vie d'après
