= Abbas Almosawi =

Bahraini painter

Abbas Mohmmed Saleh Almosawi
- Born: 1952 (age 73–74)
- Known for: Painting
- Movement: Impressionism and Abstract Expressionism
- Website: www.abbasalmosawi.info

Abbas Almosawi (born 1952) is a Bahraini painter. Abbas Mohammed Saleh Almosawi (born 1952) is a Bahraini painter known for his depictions of traditional Bahraini life, including souks, coastal environments, and urban heritage. His work combines impressionistic and abstract elements, with an emphasis on color, atmosphere, and memory. Over a career spanning several decades, he has exhibited in Bahrain and internationally and is associated with themes of cultural preservation and identity.

== Early life and education ==
Almosawi was born in Bahrain in 1952. He obtained a diploma from the Bahrain Teachers Training College before pursuing a Bachelor’s degree in Interior Design at Cairo University.

His early exposure to Bahrain’s traditional marketplaces and coastal landscapes influenced his later artistic focus, particularly in his recurring depictions of souks and everyday social life.

== Career ==
Almosawi began his artistic career in the 1970s. His work developed around representations of Bahraini heritage, often portraying markets, seafronts, and village scenes. His compositions typically combine architectural structure with expressive color and layered spatial arrangements.

He has held solo exhibitions in Bahrain and abroad and has participated in group exhibitions across the Middle East, Europe, and Asia. In addition to his studio practice, he has contributed to Bahrain’s art scene through involvement with local cultural institutions, including the Bahrain Arts Society.

== Artistic style and themes ==
Almosawi’s paintings are characterized by a fusion of impressionistic and abstract approaches. His work often emphasizes atmosphere, light, and movement, rather than strict realism.

A recurring focus in his work is the documentation and reinterpretation of Bahraini cultural life. Scenes of souks, fishing communities, and social gatherings are presented not only as visual records but also as expressions of collective memory and identity. His use of color and texture contributes to a sense of nostalgia and continuity between past and present.

== Art & Peace Project ==
In 1991, Almosawi initiated the Art & Peace Project, an international art initiative aimed at promoting peace and cultural dialogue through collaborative artistic expression. The project has involved participation from artists and communities across multiple countries and has been associated with events linked to international organizations, including the United Nations.

== Exhibitions and recognition ==
Almosawi has exhibited his work in Bahrain and internationally, including in cities such as Geneva, Paris, Cairo, and London. His work has been included in both solo and group exhibitions over several decades.

He has received recognition from cultural institutions in Bahrain and the region for his contributions to the visual arts.

== Legacy ==
Almosawi is considered part of a generation of artists who contributed to the development of Bahrain’s modern art movement. His work continues to engage with themes of heritage and identity and is associated with efforts to preserve visual narratives of Bahraini cultural life.

=== Education and qualifications ===
- 1975 Diploma from Teacher Training college, Bahrain
- 1979 BA in Interior Design from University of Cairo
- 1986 A specialized course organized by US Embassy to have a tour at American Arts

=== Selected solo exhibitions ===
- 1977 Art Exhibition at Sheraton Hotel, Manama, Bahrain
- 1985 Art Exhibition at Bahrain Arts Society
- 1986 Art Exhibition at British Bank of the Middle East, Manama, Bahrain
- 1991 Gulf War Exhibition, Sheraton Hotel, Manama, Bahrain
- 1993 Gallery Caldarese, Bologna
- 1995 Art Exhibition at United Nations, Geneva, Switzerland
- 1996 Art Exhibition in Paris, Geneva, and Lausanne, Switzerland.
- 1998 25 years of professional art, Bahrain Arts Centre & Bahrain Arts Society, Bahrain
- 2000 Art Exhibition at Al Riwaq Gallery at Adleya, Bahrain
- 2006 Arab Countries League, Cairo, Egypt
- Selected Group Exhibitions:
- 1985-2011: Art Exhibitions in Mauritius, Egypt, Oman, Switzerland, France, Russia, Taipei, India, Kuwait, Morocco, China, Jordan, UK, Ireland, and Tunisia
- 2003 Art Exhibition in London with H. E. Shaikh Rashed Al-Khalifa
- 2005 Fine Art Exhibition in Taiwan with H. E. Shaikh Rashed Al-Khalifa

== Peace projects ==
- 1993 Inauguration of Peace Project on 10 July 1993 at the Bahrain Contemporary Arts Society
- 1995 Peace Project in Germany
- 1995 Peace Project in Oman
- 1996 Peace Project in Castle M., Italy
- 1997 Peace Project in Milan, Italy
- 1997 Peace Project in Palace of UN on the UN 50th Anniversary with 1000 artists and children
- 2001 New Millennium Peace Message in Tree of Life with 2000 students from private schools
- 2005 Peace Project in Geneve, Switzerland on the UN 60th Anniversary with 192 countries
- 2006 Peace Project in Arab Countries League in Cairo on the UN 60th Anniversary with 500 artists and children
- 2007 Peace Project in China with 100 children and 20 artists
- 2013 Opening of Peace & Art House in Janabeya
- 2015 Invitation from UN Secretary to hold Peace Project in New York on the UN 70th anniversary

== Selected awards and prizes ==
- 1977 First Prize, Gulf Air Competition for Shareholding Countries
- 1978 First Prize, Dilmun Prize, Annual Exhibition, Ministry of Information, Bahrain
- 1984 First Prize, Competition for Centennial Stamp Series, Bahrain Postal Services
- 1990 Al Danah Award, National Day Exhibition, Kuwait
- 2003 Malwan Award, Saudi Arabian Airlines, Jeddah
- 2009 First Degree Competency Award from H. M. King of Bahrain
