= Lyes Salem =

Algerian actor and film director (born 1966)

- Born: 1966 (age 59–60); Algiers
- Occupations: Actor, film director
- Notable work: Masquerades

Lyès Salem (Arabic: إلياس سالم) (born 1966 in Algiers) is an Algerian actor and film director.

His first film as director, Masquerades, won several prizes in France.

== Filmography ==
=== As director ===
- Lhasa (short, 1999)
- Cousines (short, awards at the Festival de Clermont-Ferrand and César Awards)
- Jean-Farès (short, awarded at the Festival international du film de Marrakech 2001)
- Mascarades (first feature film)

=== As actor ===
- L’Ecole de la Chair (1998)
- American Cuisine (1998) - Karim
- Rendezvous in Samarkand (1999) - Mohammed
- Meet the Baltringues (2000)
- Filles uniques (2003) - L'avocat jeune beur
- À ton image (2004) - Antoine
- Banlieue 13 (2004) - Samy
- Alex (2005) - Karim
- Munich (2005) - Arab Guard #1
- Délice Paloma (2007) - Maître Djaffar
- The First Day of the Rest of Your Life (2008) - Le type saoul qui veut du Abba
- Mascarades (2008) - Mounir Mekbel
- La tête en friche (2010) - Youssef - le serveur
- Des filles en noir (2010) - Le docteur
- Dernier étage gauche gauche (2010) - Hamza Barriba
- Nobody Else But You (2011) - Gus
- Rock the Casbah (2013) - Youssef
- L'Oranais (2014) - Djaffar
- I'm Dead But I Have Friends (2015) - Dany
- Je suis à vous tout de suite (2015) - Le douanier algérien
- Carole Matthieu (2016) - Alain
- Ôtez-moi d'un doute (2017) - Madjid
- Sparring (2017) - Omar
- Ramdam (2017) - Amine
- La finale (2018) - Hicham Soualem
- Le mystère Henri Pick (2019) - Producteur émission Infinitif
- Abou Leila (2019)
- Honey Cigar (2020)
- For My Country (2022) - Colonel Mohamedi
- A Gentleman in Moscow (2024) - Andrey Duras
