= Abou Leila =

- Directed by: Amin Sidi-Boumédiène
- Written by: Amin Sidi-Boumédiène
- Produced by: Louise Bellicaud; Yacine Bouaziz; Claire Charles-Gervais; Fayçal Hammoum
- Cinematography: Kaname Onoyama
- Production companies: Thala Films Production; In Vivo Films; KNM Production
- Distributed by: UFO Distribution (France)
- Release dates: May 2019 (Cannes); 15 July 2020 (France)
- Running time: 135 minutes
- Countries: Algeria; France; Qatar

Abou Leila is a 2019 Algerian drama thriller film directed by Amin Sidi-Boumédiène. The film has received several awards at international festivals.

== Synopsis ==
Algeria, 1994. S. and Lotfi, two childhood friends, cross the desert in search of Abou Leila, a dangerous terrorist. The pursuit seems absurd, as the Sahara has not yet been affected by the wave of attacks. But S., whose mental health is unstable, is convinced that he will find Abou Leila there. Lotfi, meanwhile, has only one thing in mind: to get S. away from the capital. However, it is as they venture deeper into the desert that they will be confronted with their own violence.

== Awards and nominations ==
- Abou Leila won 5 awards and received 8 nominations.

=== Awards ===
- 2020: Gérard Frot-Coutaz Award for Best First Film – Entrevues Belfort Film Festival.
- 2019: Silver Méliès for Best European Fantastic Feature Film – Neuchâtel International Fantastic Film Festival.
- 2019: New Waves Award for Best Film – Seville European Film Festival.
- 2020: Critics' Award – D'A Film Festival Barcelona.
- 2019: Best Actor (Lyès Salem) – Carthage Film Festival.

=== Nominations ===
- 2019: Grand Prize – International Critics' Week (Cannes Film Festival).
- 2019: Caméra d'Or – Cannes Film Festival.
- 2019: Best Film – Cairo Film Critics' Week (Cairo International Film Festival).
- 2019: Golden Puffin for Best Film – Reykjavík International Film Festival.
- 2020: Talent Award – D'A Film Festival Barcelona.
- 2019: Tanit d'Or for Best Feature Film – Carthage Film Festival.
- 2021: Best International Co-production – Lumières Awards.
- 2019: Janine Bazin Grand Prize – Entrevues Belfort Film Festival.

== See also ==
- algerian cinema
- List of Algerian films
- Amin Sidi-Boumédiène
