= Amin Sidi-Boumédiène =

Franco-Algerian filmmaker

- Born: Amin Sidi-Boumédiène; March 5, 1982 (age 44); Paris, France
- Education: Conservatoire Libre du Cinéma Français
- Occupations: Director, writer, screenwriter
- Years active: 2010–present

Amin Sidi-Boumédiène (born 5 March 1982), is a Franco–Algerian filmmaker. He is best known as the director of critically acclaimed short Al Djazira and film Abou Leila.

== Personal life ==
He was born on 5 March 1982 in Paris, France. However, he later grew up in Algiers, Algeria. He returned to France and studied chemistry after his baccalauréat.

== Career ==
He obtained a degree in film directing from Conservatoire Libre du Cinéma Français (CLCF) in Paris in 2005. Then he made his maiden short film Tomorrow, Algiers? in 2011. The film was selected in several international film festivals. Then he made his second short film Al Djazira, which was filmed in Algiers in July 2012. It won the Award for the Best Arab Film at the Abu Dhabi film Festival.

In 2014, he directed his third short Serial K.. The film was screened at the film days of Bejaia. After series of successful short films, he made his maiden feature film, Abou Leila, a dark film. It was completely shot in his home country Algeria. The film was released in theaters on 15 July 2020. It was also previously screened in the 58th Critics' Week section at 2019 Cannes Film Festival. In November 2019, the film won the award for the Best Debut Film of a Director at 50th International Film Festival of India.

== Filmography ==
=== Feature films ===
| Year | English Title | Original Title | Notes |
|---|---|---|---|
| 2019 | Abou Leila | أبو ليلى | |
| 2026 | Les Derniers jours de R.M | | Post-production |

=== Short films ===
| Year | Film | Notes |
|---|---|---|
| 2010 | Tomorrow, Algiers? | Also editor |
| 2012 | Al Djazira | Also editor |
| 2014 | Serial K. | Also editor |

== See also ==
- 50th International Film Festival of India
- 2019 Cannes Film Festival
