= The Barrier (1990 film) =

1990 Bahraini drama film

- A 1990 theatrical poster
- Directed by: Bassam Al-Thawadi
- Written by: Ameen Salih (screenplay), Ali Al Sharqawi (dialogue)
- Screenplay by: Ameen Salih
- Produced by: Bassam Al-Thawadi
- Starring: Ebrahim Bahar; Rashed Al-Hassan; Mariam Ziman
- Cinematography: Hassan Abdulkareem
- Edited by: Yousif Al Malakh
- Music by: Hani Shnudah
- Release date: June 6, 1990 (Bahrain)
- Running time: 97 minutes
- Country: Bahrain
- Language: Arabic
- Budget: $150,000 (estimated)

The Barrier (transliterated: Al Hajiz) is a 1990 Bahraini drama film directed and produced by Bassam Al-Thawadi, starring Ebrahim Bahar, Rashed Al-Hassan, and Mariam Ziman. The screenplay was written by Ameen Salih. The film is widely regarded as being the first feature film produced in Bahrain.

== Summary ==
The movie deals with social and emotional barriers imposed upon individuals by society and also with those that the individual imposes upon himself. The characters in the movie lack the ability to communicate with each other and therefore, fail to understand their own emotions. Hence, they fail to maintain healthy relationships with each other because of the lack of love amongst them. This failure is attributed to the surrounding environment that does not allow for healthy relationships to grow and prosper.

== Cast ==
- Ebrahim Bahar as Mustafa
- Rashed Al-Hassan as Hassan
- Mariam Ziman as Fatima
- Gahtan Al-Gahtani as Mohammed
- Latifa Mujren as the Mother
- Abdulrahman Barakat as the Father
- Soad Ali as Huda
- Anwar Ahmed as Gang man
- Norah Yousif as the Neighbor
- Amina Hussain as Street Girl
