= A Bahraini Tale =

- Theatrical release poster
- Directed by: Bassam Al-Thawadi
- Screenplay by: Fareed Ramadan
- Produced by: Moh'd Abdulkhaliq; Bassam Al-Thawadi
- Starring: Saad Abdulla; Fatima Abdulrahim; Abdulla Al Sa'adawi; Ebrahim Al-Ghanim; Hassan Al-Majed; Mahmood Al-Mulla; Juma'an Al-Rowayai; Ahmed Aqlan
- Cinematography: Shamdat Sainudeen
- Edited by: Osama Al-Saif
- Music by: Mohammed Haddad
- Production company: Bahrain Film Production
- Distributed by: Rotana Studios; BFP
- Release date: November 8, 2006 (Bahrain)
- Running time: 96 minutes
- Country: Bahrain
- Language: Bahrani Arabic
- Budget: $1,000,000 (estimated)

A Bahraini Tale (Arabic: حكاية بحرينية, romanized: Ḥikāya Baḥrayniyya) is a 2006 Bahraini Arabic-language drama film directed by Bassam Al-Thawadi, screenplay by Fareed Ramadan and starring Saad Abdulla, Fatima Abdulrahim and Abdulla Al Sa'adawi. This is the third feature film to be directed by Bassam al-Thawadi and one of the only three films ever made in Bahrain.

== Synopsis ==
Set during the Six-Day War of 1967, the film revolves around the personal story of a middle-class Bahraini family and an account of the hopes and faith the Arab world had in Gamal Abdul Nasser as its leader.

== Cast ==
- Saad Abdulla as Salim
- Fatima Abdulrahim as Fatima
- Abdulla Al Sa'adawi as Juma Khamis
- Ebrahim Al-Ghanim as Tickets Man
- Hassan Al-Majed as Mahmood
- Mahmood Al-Mulla as Bu Jassim
- Juma'an Al-Rowayai as Hamad
- Ahmed Aqlan as Sultan
- Abdulla Bahar as Mad Man
- Yousif Bu Hallol as Yaqoob
- Ahmed Fardan as Salman
- Shayma Janahi as Munira
- Mubarak Khamis as Abdulla Khamis
- Abdulrahman Mahmood as Man
- Wafa Maki as Mahmood Sister
- Abdulla Malik as Ali
- Fahad Mandi as Yahya
- Latifa Mujren as Hamad's Mother
- Shatha Sabt as Nayla
- Majeda Sultan as Sharoof Al-Zarqa
- Abdulla Wlaad as Rashed
- Mariam Ziman as Latifa
- Nadeem Ziman as Khalifa

== Reception ==
The film was screened nationwide across Bahrain and across the Arab world. The film was critically acclaimed by critics locally and internationally. It was given a 90% rating by Rotten Tomatoes - NB: not available on Rotten Tomatoes so not verifiable.
