= Dubai International Film Festival =

Film festival in UAE, founded 2004

Dubai International Film Festival مهرجان دبي السينمائي الدولي
- Location: Dubai, United Arab Emirates
- Founded: 2004
- Awards: Muhr Awards
- Language: Arabic; English

The Dubai International Film Festival (DIFF, Arabic: مهرجان دبي السينمائي الدولي) was the largest film festival in the Arab region. With particular emphasis on showcasing Arab, Asian, and African cinema, it also helped to develop industry and talent in the region. It was held in Dubai in the United Arab Emirates.

The Muhr Awards, including the Muhr AsiaAfrica Awards, are the main festival awards.

== History ==
The inaugural Dubai International Film Festival took place in 2004, where 76 films were screened.

At its 5th edition in 2008, DIFF ran its first Asia Africa section. My Secret Sky, a South African film in the Zulu language directed by Madoda Ncayiyana, opened the section. The festival featured 181 films from 66 countries, and the red carpet event included Goldie Hawn, Ben Affleck, Danny Glover, Oliver Stone, and Harry Belafonte. The grand prize went to Masquerades, directed by Algerian director Lyes Salem.

The 9th edition of the festival took place in December 2012, and featured films from the Philippines, China, Türkiye, Angola, and Senegal.

In 2014 DIFF screened a line-up of 118 feature films, shorts and documentaries from around the world including 55 world premieres and international premieres. Opening the 2014 Festival was the Oscar-nominated The Theory of Everything, directed by James Marsh and starring Eddie Redmayne and Felicity Jones.

The 12th edition of DIFF took place in December 2015. At that time, the festival director was Shivani Pandya.

For its 14th edition in 2017, the festival screened 141 films from around the world, and by that time was the biggest film festival in the region.

In 2018, the DIFF announced it would take place every two years, with the 15th edition announced for 2019. The next festival will take place in December 2027.

== Overview ==
The DIFF is held under the patronage of the Crown Prince of Dubai, Sheikh Mohammed Bin Rashid Al Maktoum, who is prime minister, vice president and ruler of Dubai. As of 2015 the festival was presented by Dubai Media City. It is a not-for-profit cultural event.

It showcases films from the Arab, Asian, Eastern European and African cinema industries, and helps to develop talent and the film industry in the region.

As of 2022, South-African born Nashen Moodley is director of the Asia and Africa Programmes and oversees the Muhr AsiaAfrica competition. He was the founder of the Muhr Awards for Excellence in Asia Africa Cinema.

The festival also established the Dubai Film Market and Dubai Film Connection to be held concurrently, to raise the profile of local directors and enhance careers of film professionals.

== Awards ==
The festival is known for its Muhr Awards. These include the Muhr AsiaAfrica Awards, Muhr Arab Awards and Muhr Emirati Awards, with section awarding prizes for best film, documentary, short film, etc.

FIPRESCI Awards for feature, short and documentary films are also given at the festival.
