= Khaled El Sheikh =

Bahraini singer (born 1958)

Khaled El Sheikh خالد الشيخ
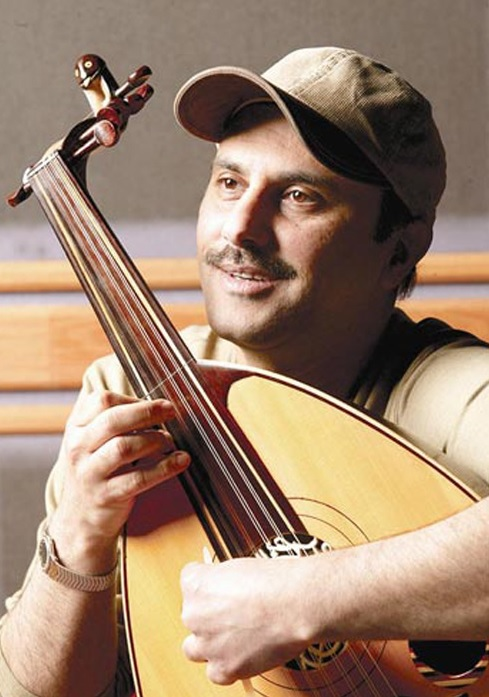
- Khaled Al-Sheikh.jpg

Background information
- Also known as: Khalid Al Shaikh
- Born: 23 September 1958 (age 67)
- Origin: Bahrain
- Genres: Classical crossover
- Occupation(s): Composer, singer & songwriter
- Years active: 80s–present
- Labels: Rotana

Khaled El Sheikh (Arabic: خالد الشيخ, or Khalid Al-Shaikh; born 23 September 1958) is a Bahraini singer.

== Education and early career ==
El Sheikh graduated from high school in Bahrain in 1975. He then relocated to Kuwait and was enrolled in Kuwait University, majoring in Economic & Political Sciences. During his second year in college, opting to follow his passion for music; he dropped out of college in 1978 and travelled to Egypt with the intent to study at the Higher Institute for Music (Conservatoire) in Cairo. There, Khaled studied musical composition for one year (1979–1980).

In 1979, he returned to Bahrain and was appointed as Oud Instructor at Bahrain Music Institute, before taking up a governmental post at the Ministry of Information until 1998.

Collaborations with prominent artists ignited Khaled's career, with compositions to fellow Bahraini singer Mohammad Aljumairi, in addition to participating in musical composition for a significant number of plays dedicated to children.

A milestone in Khaled's career was the composition he provided for the song Shuwaiekh Mn Ardh Meknes by Aljumairi in 1982. The unprecedented success of the song cemented Khaled's status as one of the pillars of music in the Persian Gulf region.

In 1983, he released his debut album, heavily written in formal Arabic, which was extremely uncommon at the time.

He was honored in the 12th Bahrain International Musical Festival on 14 October 2003. He was also honored by Culture & Arts Directorate, Ministry of Information, for best music and sound effects for Akhbar AlMajnoon play on 6 July 2005.

== Participation in festivals ==
Khalid Al Sheikh received numerous awards and certificates of appreciation and honor throughout his career:
A certificate of appreciation and honor of the festival of Eid art Iraq 1985
A guest of honor and appreciation in the Arab Song Festival VI, primarily in Bahrain 1996
Testimony in honor of the Bahrain International Festival XI Music Bahraini October 2003
The prize for best music and sound effects, "the formation of music and songs" 2005
Shield pilot astronauts Arab music in the Doha Song Festival VIII January 2007

== Songs and music works ==
Own albums:
Kulama Kunta Bequrbi, 1983.
Mudeer Al Rah, 1984.
Ya Ubaid, 1985.
Kamanjeh, 1986.
Naam Naam, 1987.
Abu Ishaq, 1988.
Elab Elab, 1989.
Gazali, 1991.
Atash El Nakheel, 1992.
Faces (Wojooh), 1997.
Impossible (Mustaheel), 1998.
Safe Place for Love (Makan Aamen Lelhub), 2000.
Rehlat Elgajar, 2002.
Sabah El Lail, 2004.
Esmi Wa Meladi, 2005.

== Theater play works ==
Land that does not grew flowers.
Birds Home.
Children Visits Al Maari.
Laila & Wolf.
Hamama Nudi Nudi.
Wonderland.
Al Baraha.
Bee & Lion.
Drums.
Boby dog Story.

== TV works ==
Alwafaa Night, Kuwait TV.
Ibn Akl, Bahrain TV.
Bu Jassim Sons, Bahrain TV.
Malfa AlAyaweed, Bahrain TV.
Hassan & Noor AlSana, Bahrain TV.
Sadoon, Bahrain TV.
Neeran, Bahrain TV.
Ramadhaniyat, Bahrain TV.
Sadeem, Bahrain TV., 2002.
Suwalef Dunya, Qatar TV, 2005.

== Shows ==
Awal (In the occasion of Sultan Qabus Visit).
Sada AlAshwaq.
Greeting to Abu Salman.
Causway of Love (In the occasion of King Fahad).
Muharraq (In the occasion of King Hamad Visit).

== Songs for Arab singers ==
- Bahrain:

- Ahmed AlJumairi
- Ebrahim Habib
- Abdulla BuQais
- Jassim AlHarban
- Husam Ahmed
- Huda Abdulla
- Mohammed Abdul Rahim
- Mahmoud Hussain
- Hend
- Adel Mahmoud
- Jaffar Habib
- Mohammed AlBakri
- Mohammed Yousif
- Aref AlZayani

- Kuwait:

- Mustafa Ahmed
- Abdulla Al Ruwaished
- Greed ElShatei
- AlAnood
- Mohammed AlBalooshi

- Qatar:

- Ali AbdulSatar

- Oman:

- Ahmed AlHarthi
- Hakeem Aayel
- Mohammed Al Makheeni
- Salem Mahaad
- Samah
- El Yaqubi

- UAE:

- Abdulla BalKhair
- Ruwaida AlMahrooqi

- Saudi Arabia:

- Abdul Majeed Abdulla
- Rashid Al Majid
- Abdulla Rashad
- Adel Kamis

- Morocco:

- Raja BalMaleeh

- Egypt:

- Gada Rajab
- Angam

- Tunisia:

- Nawal Gasham

== Personal life ==
He is married with 5 daughters (Dareen, Noor, Marwa, Samawa, and Wanas).
