= List of films about the Algerian War =

Below is an incomplete list of feature films, television films or television series which include events of the Algerian War. This list does not include documentaries, short films.

== 1950s ==
| Year | Country | Main title (Alternative title) | Original title (Original script) | Director | Subject |
|---|---|---|---|---|---|
| 1958 | Egypt | Jamila, the Algerian | جميلة | Youssef Chahine | Biography, Drama, History, War. Djamila Bouhired |

== 1960s ==
| Year | Country | Main title (Alternative title) | Original title (Original script) | Director | Subject |
|---|---|---|---|---|---|
| 1962 | France | The Fight on the Island | Le Combat dans l'île | Alain Cavalier | Drama, Thriller. Organisation armée secrète |
| 1962 | France | The Olive Trees of Justice | Les Oliviers de la justice | James Blue | Drama. |
| 1962 | Belgium; Spain; Italy; West Germany | Commando | Marcia o Crepa | Frank Wisbar | Action, War. French Foreign Legion |
| 1963 | France; Italy | Muriel | Muriel ou le Temps d'un retour | Alain Resnais | Drama. |
| 1963 | France | The Good Life | La Belle Vie | Robert Enrico | Drama, War. |
| 1963 | France | The Little Soldier | Le petit soldat | Jean-Luc Godard | Drama, War. |
| 1964 | France; Italy | The Unvanquished | L'Insoumis | Alain Cavalier | Drama, Thriller. Organisation armée secrète |
| 1965 | Algeria | So Young a Peace | Une si jeune paix | Jacques Charby | |
| 1966 | France; Italy | Target 500 million | Objectif 500 millions | Pierre Schoendoerffer | Crime, Drama, Thriller. Organisation armée secrète |
| 1966 | United States | Lost Command | Les Centurions | Mark Robson | Action, Drama, War. Based on a novel The Centurions. |
| 1966 | Italy; Algeria | The Battle of Algiers | معركة الجزائر; La battaglia di Algeri | Gillo Pontecorvo | Drama, War. |
| 1967 | France; Spain | The Hotheads | Les Têtes brûlées | Willy Rozier | Adventure. Based on a novel Les Têtes brûlées. |
| 1967 | Algeria | The Winds of the Aures | ريح الاوراس; Le Vent des Aurès | Mohammed Lakhdar-Hamina | Drama, War. |
| 1968 | Algeria | Hassan, Terrorist | Hassan Terro | Mohammed Lakhdar-Hamina | Comedy, Drama. |
| 1969 | Algeria | Outlaws | الخارجون عن القانون; Les Hors-la-loi | Tewfik Fares | Drama. |

== 1970s ==
| Year | Country | Main title (Alternative title) | Original title (Original script) | Director | Subject |
|---|---|---|---|---|---|
| 1971 | Algeria | Black Sweat | لعرق الأسود; Sueur noire | Sid Ali Mazif | |
| 1971 | Algeria | Patrol to the East | دورية نحو الشرق; Patrouille à l'Est | Amar Laskri | Action, Drama, History, War. |
| 1971 | Algeria | The Opium and the Stick | الأفيون والعصا; L'Opium et le Bâton | Ahmed Rachedi | Action, Drama, War. |
| 1972 | France | The uprooted | Les déracinés | André Teisseire | War. Algiers putsch of 1961 |
| 1972 | France | To Be Twenty in the Aures | Avoir 20 ans dans les Aurès | René Vautier | Drama, War. |
| 1972 | Algeria | Forbidden Zone | منطقة محرمة; Zone interdite | Ahmed Lallem | |
| 1973 | France; Spain; Italy | The Conspiracy | Le Complot | René Gainville | Action, Drama, History, Thriller. Algiers putsch of 1961 |
| 1973 | France; Italy; Tunisia | Nothing to Report | R.A.S. | Yves Boisset | Drama, War. Based on an unknown story. |
| 1973 | Algeria; France | December | ديسمبر; Décembre | Mohammed Lakhdar-Hamina | Drama. |
| 1973 | United Kingdom; France | The Day of the Jackal | | Fred Zinnemann | Crime, Drama, Thriller. Organisation armée secrète |
| 1974 | France | The Madwoman of Toujane | La Folle de Toujane | René Vautier; Nicole Le Garrec | Drama. |
| 1974 | Algeria | The Escape of Hassan Terro | هروب حسان الطيرو; L'évasion de Hassan Terro | Mustapha Badie | Comedy. |
| 1975 | Algeria | The South Wind | ريح الجنوب; Le Vent du Sud | Mohamed Slimane Riad | Drama. Based on a novel The South Wind. |
| 1975 | Algeria | The Legacy | الارث; L'héritage | Mohamed Bouamari | |
| 1975 | Algeria | Chronicle of the Years of Fire | وقائع سنين الجمر; Chronique des Années de Braise | Mohammed Lakhdar-Hamina | Drama, History. |
| 1975 | Algeria | November boys | أولاد نوفمبر; Les Enfants de Novembre | Moussa Haddad | Drama. |
| 1976 | France | In Hell | Gloria Mundi | Nikos Papatakis | Drama. |
| 1977 | France | The Question | La Question | Laurent Heynemann | Drama, War. Based on the book La Question. |
| 1977 | France | Drummer-Crab | Le Crabe-tambour | Pierre Schoendoerffer | Adventure, Drama, War. Based on a novel Le Crabe-Tambour. Pierre Guillaume |

== 1980s ==
| Year | Country | Main title (Alternative title) | Original title (Original script) | Director | Subject |
|---|---|---|---|---|---|
| 1980 | France | Some news | Certaines nouvelles | Jacques Davila | Comedy, Drama. |
| 1982 | France | A Captain's Honor | L'Honneur d'un capitaine | Pierre Schoendoerffer | Drama, War. |
| 1983 | France | Liberty at Night | Liberté, la nuit | Philippe Garrel | Drama, War. |
| 1983 | France | The Sacrificed | Les Sacrifiés | Okacha Touita | |
| 1986 | Algeria; France | The Crazy Years of the Twist | Les Folles Années du twist | Mahmoud Zemmouri | Comedy, Drama. |
| 1987 | Algeria | The Doors of Silence | أبواب الصمت; Les Portes du silence | Amar Laskri | War. |
| 1989 | France; Canada; Belgium | Dear brother | Cher frangin | Gérard Mordillat | |

== 1990s ==
| Year | Country | Main title (Alternative title) | Original title (Original script) | Director | Subject |
|---|---|---|---|---|---|
| 1991 | France | The Wind of All Saints' Day | Le Vent de la Toussaint | Gilles Béhat | Drama. Based on a novel Le Vent de la Toussaint : Un médecin dans le djebel. |
| 1993 | France; Algeria | The Honor of the Tribe | L'Honneur de la tribu | Mahmoud Zemmouri | Comedy, Drama, War. Based on a novel L'Honneur de la tribu. |
| 1994 | France | Wild Reeds | Les Roseaux sauvages | André Téchiné | Drama. |
| 1994 | France | Poorly Extinguished Fires | Des feux mal éteints | Serge Moati | Drama, War. Based on a novel Des feux mal éteints. |
| 1997 | France | Under Women's Feet | Sous les pieds des femmes | Rachida Krim | |
| 1998 | Algeria; Vietnam | Lotus flower | Fleur de lotus Bông sen | Amar Laskri; Trần Đắc | |
| 1999 | France | The Cry of Men | Le Cri des hommes | Okacha Touita | Drama. |

== 2000s ==
| Year | Country | Main title (Alternative title) | Original title (Original script) | Director | Subject |
|---|---|---|---|---|---|
| 2002 | United Kingdom | Legion of Honor | | Martin Huberty | Drama, War. French Foreign Legion |
| 2005 | France | Before oblivion | Avant l'oubli | Augustin Burger | Drama. |
| 2005 | France; Belgium | The Betrayal | La Trahison | Philippe Faucon | Drama, War. |
| 2005 | France; Austria; Germany; Italy | Hidden | Caché | Michael Haneke | Drama, Mystery, Thriller. Paris massacre of 1961 |
| 2006 | France; Belgium | The Colonel | Mon colonel | Laurent Herbiet | Crime, Drama, History, War. Based on a novel Mon colonel. |
| 2007 | France | | Nocturnes | Henry Colomer | Drama, War. |
| 2007 | France; Algeria | Summer of '62 | Cartouches gauloises | Mehdi Charef | Drama. |
| 2007 | France; Morocco | Intimate Enemies | L'Ennemi intime | Florent-Emilio Siri | Drama, History, War. |
| 2008 | Algeria | Mostefa Ben Boulaïd | مصطفى بن بولعيد | Ahmed Rachedi | Action, Biography, Drama, History, War. Mostefa Ben Boulaïd |

== 2010s ==
| Year | Country | Main title (Alternative title) | Original title (Original script) | Director | Subject |
|---|---|---|---|---|---|
| 2010 | France | A View of Love | Un balcon sur la mer | Nicole Garcia | Drama, Mystery, Romance, Thriller. |
| 2010 | France; Algeria; Belgium; Tunisia; Italy | Outside the Law | خارجون عن القانون; Hors-la-loi | Rachid Bouchareb | Crime, Drama, War. Sétif and Guelma massacre, Paris massacre of 1961 |
| 2012 | Algeria | Zabana! | زبانة | Saïd Ould Khelifa | Drama, History, War. Ahmed Zabana |
| 2012 | France | What the Day Owes the Night | Ce que le jour doit à la nuit | Alexandre Arcady | Drama, Romance. |
| 2014 | Algeria | Twilight of Shadows | غروب الظلال; Crépuscule des ombres | Mohammed Lakhdar-Hamina | Drama. |
| 2014 | France | Far from Men | Loin des hommes | David Oelhoffen | Drama, War. Based on short story The Guest. |
| 2014 | Algeria | Krim Belkacem | كريم بلقاسم | Ahmed Rachedi | Action, Biography, Drama, History, War. Krim Belkacem |
| 2015 | Algeria | Lotfi | لطفي | Ahmed Rachedi | Action, Biography, Drama, History, War. Benali Boudghène |
| 2015 | Algeria | The Well | Le puits | Lotfi Bouchouchi | Drama. |

== 2020s ==
| Year | Country | Main title (Alternative title) | Original title (Original script) | Director | Subject |
|---|---|---|---|---|---|
| 2020 | France; Belgium | Home Front | Des hommes | Lucas Belvaux | Drama, History, War. Based on a novel Des hommes. |
| 2020 | France | The Breitner Commando | Qu'un sang impur... | Abdel Raouf Dafri | Drama, War. |
| 2020 | France; Belgium; Algeria | Faithful | De nos frères blessés | Hélier Cisterne | Biography, Drama, History. Based on a novel De nos frères blessés. |
| 2022 | France; Belgium | | Les Harkis | Philippe Faucon | Drama, History, War. Harki |
| 2023 | France | The Little Blond of the Casbah | Le Petit Blond de la Casbah | Alexandre Arcady | Biography. Based on a novel Le Petit Blond de la Casbah. |

== Science fiction, fantasy, and horror films ==
| Year | Country | Main title (Alternative titles) | Original title (Original script) | Director | Battles, campaigns, events depicted |
|---|---|---|---|---|---|
| 2010 | France; Morocco | Stranded | Djinns | Hugues Martin; Sandra Martin | Horror, Mystery. |

== Television films ==
| Year | Country | Main title (Alternative title) | Original title (Original script) | Director | Subject |
|---|---|---|---|---|---|
| 1981 | France | The Blue Weapon | L'Arme au bleu | Maurice Frydland | Based on a novel L'Arme au bleu. |
| 1992 | France; Algeria | It was war | C'était la guerre | Maurice Failevic; Ahmed Rachedi | War. |
| 2005 | France | Dark night October 17, 1961 | Nuit noire 17 octobre 1961 | Alain Tasma | Drama, History. Based on the book La Bataille de Paris. Paris massacre of 1961 |
| 2006 | France | | Harkis | Alain Tasma | Drama. Harki |
| 2012 | France | The Bay of Algiers | La Baie d'Alger | Merzak Allouache | Drama. Based on an autobiography. |
| 2012 | France | For Djamila | Pour Djamila | Caroline Huppert | Drama, History. Djamila Boupacha |

== Television series ==
| Year | Country | Main title (Alternative title) | Original title (Original script) | Director | Subject |
|---|---|---|---|---|---|
| 1960 | East Germany | The escape from hell | Die Flucht aus der Hölle | Hans-Erich Korbschmitt | Crime, Thriller. French Foreign Legion |
| 1965 | Algeria | The night is afraid of the sun | الليل يخاف من الشمس; La nuit a peur du soleil | Mustapha Badie | |
| 2003 | France | The farewell | L'Adieu | François Luciani | Drama, History, Romance, War. Pied-Noir |
| 2024 | United States | Monsieur Spade | | Scott Frank | Crime, Drama, Thriller. |
