= Hassan El-Hassani =

Algerian actor (1916–1987)

- Born: Hassan Bencheikh; 24 April 1916; Ksar Boukhari, French Algeria
- Died: 25 September 1987 (aged 71); Algiers, Algeria
- Occupations: Comedian, actor
- Years active: 1940–1987
- Notable work: L'Opium et le Bâton

Hassan El-Hassani (April 24, 1916 – September 25, 1987), known by the stage name Hassan El-Hassani (Arabic: حسن الحسني), was an Algerian comedian.

== Biography ==
Bencheikh was born in Ksar Boukhari, near Medea, French Algeria. He was a humorist, actor, and comedian who was responsible for the founding of various theatre groups. He was also a member of the National Assembly and received the Resistance Medal.

Across more than thirty films, Bencheikh embodied Boubagra, a caricature of a naive peasant full of good sense and wisdom in the face of socioeconomic stagnation.

Bencheikh had comedic aspirations from childhood, and he first began acting in 1940 when Mahieddine Bachtarzi's theatre company travelled through Berrouaghia, where Bencheikh worked as a hairdresser. Encouraged by Bachtarzi, El Hassani wrote his first play, Hassan's Dreams, a satire mocking European colonialism in Africa. The anti-Colonialist messages in the play led to his arrest and imprisonment on 8 May 1945. In prison, he wrote comedic sketches to boost morale among his fellow prisoners.

Released at the end of World War II, Bencheikh moved to the Casbah of Algiers, where he worked as a barber, as well as in theater. He created the character of Na'anaa in the play El-houria which became, in 1950, the plot then tigoule ou ti ghoul pas. After Bencheikh's theatre groups disbanded, he was hired in 1953 to act on television under Mustapha Badie^{[fr]}. His first drama under Badie was La poursuite (The Chase). When the Algerian war for independence broke out, he was an adamant supporter of the Algerian resistance. In 1968, he joined the Algerian National Theatre, then abandoned his favourite character Na'anaa for the more popular Boubagra. With the Four Seasons theater troupe, Bencheikh toured Algeria for 10 years. In 1976, he was elected to the National People's Congress, and the company was dissolved. Bencheikh has been featured in the credits of many television and film productions since Algerian independence.

El-Hassani died in Algiers on 25 September 1987.

== Filmography ==
- 1966: The Winds of the Aures (by Mohammed Lakhdar-Hamina)
- 1968: Hassan Terro (by Mohammed Lakhdar-Hamina) - Bahri
- 1969: Z (by Costa-Gavras) - The General's Driver
- 1969: L'Opium et le Bâton (by Ahmed Rachedi) - Brahim Ben Brahim
- 1970: Brancaleone Alle Crociate (by Mario Monicelli)
- 1971: Les aveux les plus doux (The Most Gentle Confessions) (by Édouard Molinaro) - The Notary
- 1972: Sanaoud by Mohamed Slim Riad
- 1972: The Holiday of Inspector Tahar (by Moussa Haddad)
- 1973: December (by Mohammed Lakhdar-Hamina)
- 1973: Les bonnes familles (The Best Families) (by Djaffer Damerdji)
- 1975: Chronicle of the Years of Fire (by Mohammed Lakhdar-Hamina)
- 1976: Les nomades (The Nomads) (by Sid Ali Mazif)
- 1976: Ech-Chebka (by Ghaouti Bendeddouche)
- 1976: Les déracinés (The Uprooted) (by Lamine Merbah)
- 1977: Barrières (Barriers) (by Ahmed Lallem)
- 1978: Le premier pas (The First Step) (by Mohamed Bouamari)
- 1982: The Damned (by El Hadi Guellal)
- 1982: Moissons d'acier (Harvests of Steel) (by Ghaouti Bendaddouche)
- 1982: A Wife for my Son (by Ali Ghanem)
- 1983: Les folles années du twist (The Wild Years of the Twist) (TV Series, by Mahmoud Zemmouri) - Mouloud
- 1983: Le moulin (The Windmill) (by Ahmed Rachedi)
- 1983: Tabûnat al-sayyid Fabre
- 1985: Buamama - Cheikh Tiout
- 1986: The Last Image (by Mohammed Lakhdar-Hamina) - Touhami
- 1987: Les portes du silence (The Gates of Silence) (by Amar Laskri)

== Bibliography ==
Dictionary of Film , Larousse, 2001.
