= L'Enfer à dix ans =

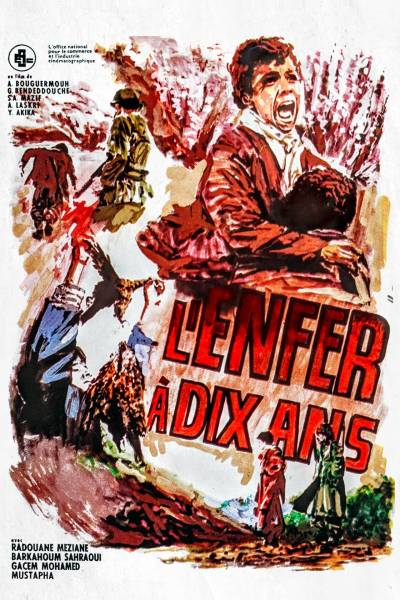
- Poster
- L'Enfer à dix ans
- Directed by: Youcef Akika; Ghaouti Bendedouche; Abderrahmane Bouguermouh; Amar Laskri; Sid Ali Mazif
- Written by: Collective (ONCIC) team, with individual contributions by episode
- Produced by: National Office for Cinema and the Cinematographic Industry (ONCIC)
- Starring: Non-professional actors (depending on episode)
- Release date: 1968
- Running time: 77 minutes
- Country: Algeria
- Language: French

Hell Is Ten Years Old (L’Enfer à dix ans) is a 1968 collective Algerian film, produced by the ONCIC. The film is composed of five short films directed by five Algerian filmmakers, addressing themes related to the war, memory, and the post-independence context.

== Synopsis ==
Each episode explores a different aspect of the War of Independence or its social consequences. :

- La Grive — Abderrahmane Bouguermouh: a schoolboy from Kabylia must deliver a secret message hidden inside a thrush.
- La Rencontre — Sid Ali Mazif
- La Mer — Ghaouti Bendedouche
- Hier Des Témoins — Amar Laskri
- Quand Janette — Youcef Akika

== Technical details ==
- Country of origin: Algeria
- Producer: ONCIC
- Directors: Youcef Akika; Ghaouti Bendedouche; Abderrahmane Bouguermouh; Amar Laskri; Sid Ali Mazif
- Runtime: about 77 minutes
- Release date: 1968
- Genre: Drama / War / Anthology film

== Context and preservation ==
According to Africultures, the film’s original negative was accidentally destroyed, and no complete copy of the film is currently available. The Algerian Cinematheque preserves a copy of Bouguermouh’s episode La Grive.

== Episodes ==
Episodes of Hell Is Ten Years Old
Title	Director	Approximate duration
La Grive	Abderrahmane Bouguermouh	36 minutes
La Rencontre	Sid Ali Mazif	20 minutes
La Mer	Ghaouti Bendedouche	duration not specified
Hier Des Témoins	Amar Laskri	24 minutes
Quand Janette	Youcef Akika	16 minutes

== See also ==
- List of Algerian films
- Cinema of Algeria
