= Taha El Amiri =

- Born: Abderrahmane Bestandji; 20 August 1927; Casbah, Algiers
- Died: 4 September 2024 (aged 97); Algiers
- Citizenship: Algerian
- Occupations: Actor, comedian, stage director, troupe director
- Notable work: (see filmography)

Taha El Amiri, born Abderrahmane Bestandji on 20 August 1927 in the Casbah of Algiers and died on 4 September 2024 in Algiers, was an Algerian theatre actor and founding member of the artistic troupe of the National Liberation Front (FLN troupe)..

== Biography ==
Taha El Amiri was born in 1927 in the Casbah of Algiers. At a very young age, he became involved in scouting and theatre activities, where he discovered the theatre and began his artistic career. He participated in the cultural movement linked to the struggle for independence and became a founding member of the FLN's artistic troupe. After independence, he pursued a career in Algerian national theatre, television and cinema, both as an actor and as a troupe director.

=== Artistic career ===
After independence, Taha El Amiri appeared in numerous Algerian plays, television series and films. He also held management positions at the Algerian National Theatre and was involved in training and promoting national theatre. Tributes and retrospectives have been dedicated to him in recent years.

== Filmography ==
Year	Title	Director / Notes
1965	La nuit a peur du soleil	Mustapha Badie — four-part film about the Algerian War of Independence
1974	Zone interdite	Ahmed Lallem — he plays the role of “El Hadj”
1974	Chronique des années de braise (Chronicle of the Years of Embers)	Mohammed Lakhdar-Hamina
1983	Le Moulin de monsieur Fabre	Ahmed Rachedi
1987	Cri de pierre	Abderrahmane Bouguermouh
2008	Si Mohand u M'hand, L'Insoumis	Rachid Benallal

=== Television / TV films ===
Year	Title	Director / Sources
1963	Le Serment	TV film by Mustapha Badie

== Theatre ==
Taha El Amiri was an actor and director at the Algerian National Theatre and participated in numerous theatre productions and tours. He remains known for his work training and mentoring young actors.

== Tributes ==
Upon his death in 2024, numerous media outlets and colleagues paid tribute to him, highlighting his contribution to Algerian theatre and his role as a cultural mujahid.

== See also ==
- Chronicle of the Years of Embers
- Cinema of Algeria
- List of Algerian films
- Theatre of Algeria
