= El Ghoula =

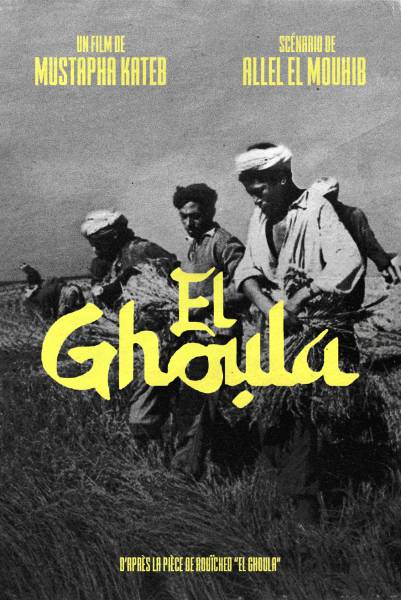
- Poster of the film El Ghoula
- الغولة
- Directed by: Mustapha Kateb
- Written by: Rouiched ; Allel El Mouhib
- Screenplay by: Rouiched ; Allel El Mouhib
- Produced by: Office des Actualités Algériennes (OAA)
- Starring: Rouiched ; Allel El Mouhib ; Larbi Zekkal
- Production company: Office des Actualités Algériennes (OAA)
- Release date: 1972
- Running time: 95 minutes
- Country: Algeria
- Language: Arabic

El Ghoula (often stylized «El-Ghoula», literally "The Ogress") is an Algerian film directed by Mustapha Kateb, released in 1972. It is an adaptation of the satirical stage play by comedian Rouiched (Ahmed Ayad) and offers a critique of opportunism and corruption in rural Algerian administration.

== Synopsis ==
El Ghoula follows the trajectory of a corrupt official who takes advantage of peasants working in an agricultural cooperative. Using empty rhetoric and revolutionary slogans, he manipulates and exploits labour, creates chaotic bureaucracy for personal ends while others fall into gambling and moral decay.

== Technical details ==
- Original title: El Ghoula
- Director: Mustapha Kateb.
- Screenplay / Adaptation: Rouiched; Allel El Mouhib.
- Main cast: Rouiched (Ahmed Ayad), Allel El Mouhib, Larbi Zekkal, Latifa Kazdarli.
- Production: Office des Actualités Algériennes (OAA).
- Country: Algeria
- Genre: social satire / tragicomedy.
- Runtime: 95 minutes.
- Year: 1972.

== Production and adaptation ==
The film is a screen adaptation of Rouiched’s theatrical satire; director Mustapha Kateb transposed the stage critique into the language of the Algerian post-independence socially engaged cinema.

== See also ==
- Cinema of Algeria
- List of Algerian films
