= Al-Mufattish Tāher Yusajjil al-Hadaf =

- Directed by: Kaddour Brahim Zakaria
- Written by: Cherif Chaawati; Hadj Abderrahmane; Kaddour Brahim Zakaria
- Starring: Hadj Abderrahmane; Yahia Benmabrouk
- Distributed by: Arab Film Distribution
- Release date: 1975
- Running time: 117 minutes
- Country: Algeria
- Language: Algerian Arabic

Al-Mufattish Tāher Yusajjil al-Hadaf (Arabic: المفتش طاهر يسجل الهدف; French: L'inspecteur Tahar marque le but, "Inspector Tahar scores the goal") is a 1975 Algerian comedy film directed by Kaddour Brahim Zakaria.

A simple case of a car accident in the city of Oran turns into a real criminal investigation led by Inspector Tahar and his sidekick apprentice.

== Cast ==
- Hadj Abderrahmane as Inspector Tahar
- Yahia Benmabrouk as the apprentice
- Boumedienne Sirat as Omar
- Zoubida Ben Bahi as Malika

== See also ==
- List of Algerian films
