= Hadj Smaine Mohamed Seghir =

Algerian actor (1932–2021)

- Born: 29 October 1932; Constantine, Algeria
- Died: 6 September 2021 (aged 88)
- Citizenship: Algerian
- Occupation(s): Playwright, actor, director and thespian
- Notable work: The Battle of Algiers

Hadj Smaine Mohamed Seghir (29 October 1932 – 6 September 2021) was an Algerian actor, director and thespian who was born in 1932 in Constantine, Algeria, France.

== Early life ==
Mr. Hadj Smaine devoted nearly 70 years of his life to theatre, film and television. His first steps in professional theatre were at the Paris Opera where he assisted legendary playwright and stage actor Jean Vilar. He also had long time collaborations with playwrights and theatre Actors Henri Corderaux, Rene Fontanel, André Croq, Phillipe Dauchet, and Pierre Vial. During a theatre tour in the South of France, he would meet another giant of Theatre: Allel El Mouhib, the two would become inseparable friends and collaborators. Together, they would found, years later, c. 1962–63, the Algerian National Theatre as well as the National School of Dramatic Arts along with the late Mahieddine Bechtarzi and Mustapha Kateb.

He was a fervent believer in the liberation of the people of Algeria, so he secretly joined the fight against French Colonial occupation in the 1950s. During the tragic events of the Battle of Algiers (La Bataille d'Alger) in the mid 50s, he would be arrested by the Parachutists of General Massu (His older brother - an associate of Algerian Revolutionary Larbi Benmhidi in the Autonomous Zone Autonome of Algiers would suffer the same fate a year later in the Casbah) and would nearly lose his life under torture at the Casino de la Corniche before cheating death and escaping with the help of his theatre instructor (and Former World War II French Officer Henri Cordereaux - a supporter of Algerian Independence).

In the early 1960s, Mr. Hadj Smaine would politely turn down different cabinet minister and ambassador posts during the reigns of both Presidents Benbella & Boumedienne to devote his time and energy to structuring & training future generations of theatre, film and television actors & directors, as well as playwrights & storytellers & would be part of numerous notable film, theatre, and television productions among which are Gilo Pontecovo's "The Battle of Algiers" (La Bataille d'Alger), "Chronicles of the years of fire" (Chroniques des Années de Braises - Festival de Cannes Golden Palm Winner 1976) by Lakhdar Hamina, "Les Enfants de Novembre" (November's Children) by Moussa Hadad, "The Eastern Platoon" (Patrouille a l'Est) by Ammar Laskri, "The Imginary Invalid" (Le Malade Imaginaire) by Molière, "The Plough and the Stars" & "Red Roses for Me" (Roses Rouges Pour Moi) by Sean O'Casey among many others.

His final collaborations would be with his own son in the last decade of his life. He would provide valuable advice and guidance on films that his son Directed, namely "Axis of Evil", "Sharia" in which he was the main character's father, and "Battle Fields" giving some of the most original suggestions about the characters and their circumstances - All films championed the unprivileged, the less fortunate and gave voice to immigrants and minorities. When asked to formally join those productions as an Executive Producer for all three films, he accepted but categorically refused to be paid for his contributions saying that he was doing it for "a worthy cause".

Mr. Hadj Smaine and his son (film director and actor Anouar H. Smaine) worked so hard for years on another feature script for a film to be shot in his native city of Constantine to help revive Algerian cinema. He had enlisted his good friend; actor and director Abdelhamid Habbati and secured impressive locations around the city's beautiful bridges and ancient Arab and Ottoman Quarters (Souika) - Their dream project to honor the ancient city of Constantine and its people seemed to be ever closer to being achieved - sadly, because of the incredible administrative difficulties, the film was never made. A few years later, Mr. Habbati (the lead actor of the project) would pass followed by Mr. Hadj Smaine on September 5, 2021, in Los Angeles, California. In the final moments of his life, Mr. Hadj Smaine was surrounded by his wife and children. He was laid to rest in Los Angeles.

== Filmography ==
- 1965: The Battle of Algiers, (La Bataglia di Algeri) de Gillo Pontecorvo
- 1966: The Winds of the Aures de Mohammed Lakhdar-Hamina
- 1968: Patrouille à l'est de Amar Laskri
- 1970: Children of November de Moussa Haddad
- 1971: After the oil
- 1974: Chronicle of the Years of Fire de Mohammed Lakhdar-Hamina
- The Adventures of a hero, Moughamarat Batal de Merzak Allouache
- Beni Hendel, Les Déracinés de Lamine Merbah
- The last image de Mohammed Lakhdar-Hamina
- 1977: El Harik de Mustapha Badia
- 1978: El Intihar de Mustapha Badia
- 1986: The man who watched the windows de Merzak Allouache
- 1982: Mariage de dupes de Hadj Rahim
- 1987: Cri de pierre de Abderahmane Bouguermouh
- 2010: Axis of Evil ou l'Axe du Mal de Anouar H. Smaine en tant que Producteur
- 2014: Sharia de Anouar H. Smaine
- 2017: Battle Fields de Anouar H. Smaine
