= Keltoum =

Algerian actress

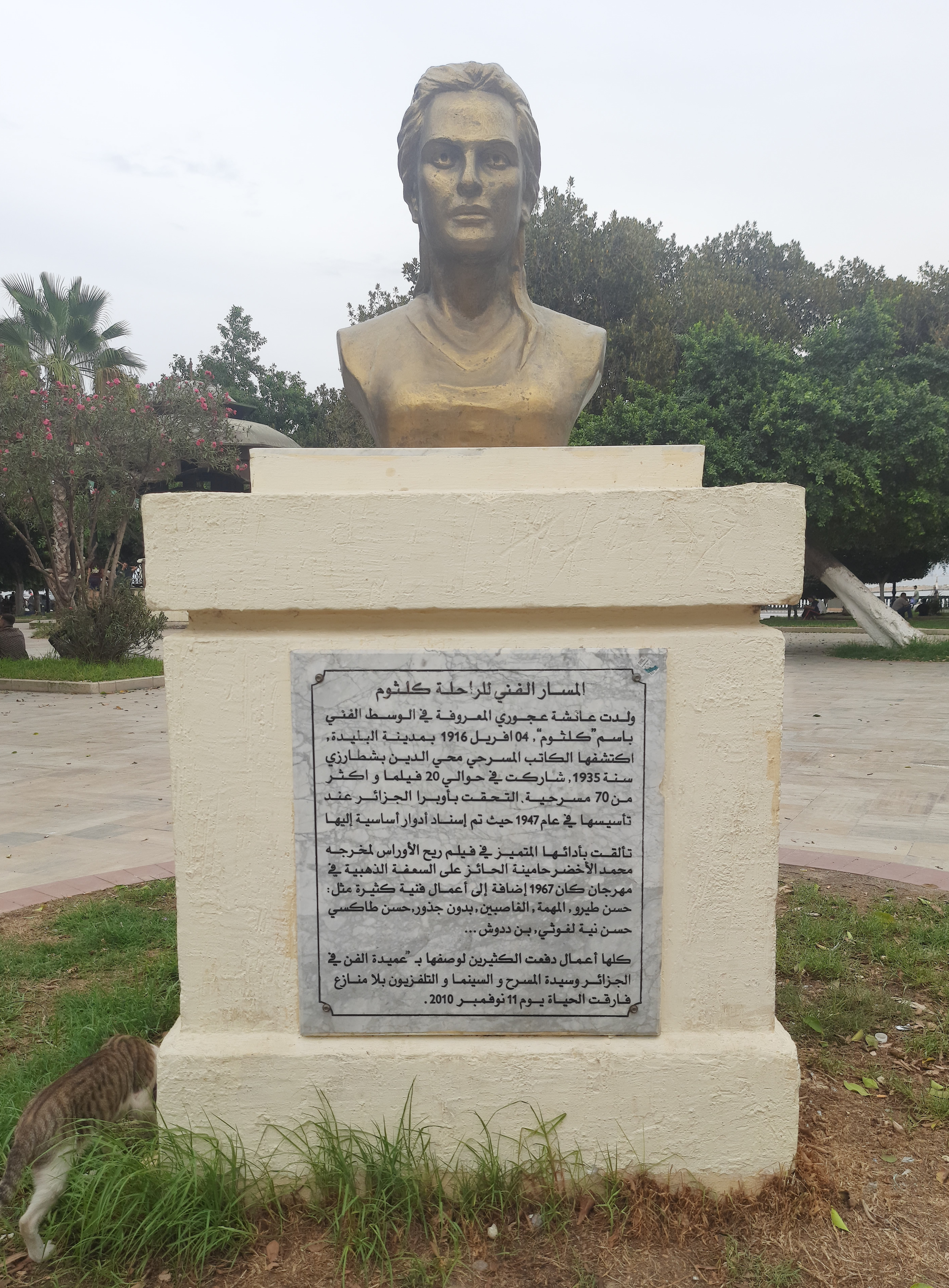
- Aïcha Adjouri
- Born: Aïcha Adjouri; April 2, 1916; Blida, Algeria
- Died: November 11, 2010 (aged 94)
- Occupation: Actress

Aïcha Adjouri, (Arabic: عائشة عجوري), often known as Keltoum (كلثوم), was an Algerian actress. She is regarded as one of the greatest Algerian actresses of all time. She was born on 2 April 1916 in Blida, and died on 11 November 2010.

== Career ==
She was discovered by playwright Mahieddine Bachtarzi in 1935, and participated in about 20 films and more than 70 plays. Keltoum joined the Algiers Opera House when it was founded in 1947, where she played the main roles.

Her outstanding performance in The Winds of the Aures, as a mother looking for her son after his arrest by French army was highly praised by critics. The film which directed by Mohammed Lakhdar-Hamina, won Best First Work in the 1967 Cannes Film Festival.

== Filmography ==
Year	Film	Role	Director	Awards
1966	The Winds of the Aures	the mother	Mohammed Lakhdar-Hamina	(France) Festival de Cannes
1968	Hassan Terro	Zakia	Mohammed Lakhdar-Hamina	
1971	The Mission		Lamine Merbah	
1972	The Rapists		Lamine Merbah	
1972	Décembre		Mohammed Lakhdar-Hamina	
1975	South Wind		Mohamed Slim Riad	
1976	Beni Hendel	mother of the Wind of Aurès	Lamine Merbah	
1982	Hassan Taxi		Mohamed Slim Riad	
1982	My Daughter in Law		Ghanem Ali	
1986	The Roaring Years of Twist	Boualem's mother	Mahmoud Zemmouri	
1989	Hassan Niya		Ghaouti Ben Dedouche	
