= Cri de pierre =

- صرخة الحجر
- Directed by: Abderrahmane Bouguermouh
- Written by: Abderrahmane Bouguermouh
- Starring: Hadj Smaine; Keltoum; Anouar H. Smaine; Taha El Amiri; Aziz Degga; Himoud Brahimi
- Music by: Malek Imache
- Release date: 1986
- Running time: 98 minutes
- Country: Algeria
- Language: Kabyle / Arabic

Cri de pierre is a 1986 Algerian film directed and written by Abderrahmane Bouguermouh. It tells the story of a group of Constantinois returning to their native village and the personal and collective upheavals that ensue.

== Synopsis ==
Led by Daoudi, a disillusioned architect, a group of Constantinois return to their village in the heart of Algeria. There, they rediscover traditions, wounds from the past and a young boy who passes on words of wisdom inherited from his deceased grandfather; the confrontation between modernity and local memory permeates the film.

== Technical details ==
- Directed: Abderrahmane Bouguermouh
- Written: Abderrahmane Bouguermouh
- Music: Malek Imache
- Format: 35 mm
- Running time: 98 minutes
- Country: Algeria
- Released: 1986

== Cast ==
- Hadj Smaine: Daoudi
- Keltoum (Aïcha Adjouri)
- Anouar H. Smaine: Young man
- Taha El Amiri
- Aziz Degga
- Himoud Brahimi

== Production and background ==
The film was directed by Abderrahmane Bouguermouh and shot in 35 mm format. It was made during a period of renewal in Algerian cinema in the 1980s, when several works explored themes such as urban life, migration and the break with the rural world. Despite receiving international critical acclaim, the film was ‘forgotten’ locally and saw little distribution in Algeria after its release; it enjoyed greater visibility abroad and at festivals.

== Filming ==
Filming took place mainly in the Constantine region and in settings representing ‘deep Algeria’, which explains the presence of actors from the region and the emphasis on local landscapes.

== Festivals and reception ==
The film has been screened internationally and cited in magazines and catalogues; it is referenced in festival and film library databases. Contemporary reviews highlight the social tone and reflective distance of the narrative (return to roots, clash between modernity and tradition).

== Critical analysis ==
Commentators rank Cri de pierre among the Algerian films of the 1980s that explore the tensions between city and countryside, memory and modernity. Author and film researcher R. Armes and other specialists on the Maghreb cite the film as an example of a national cinema in search of identity in the face of social change.

== See also ==
- algerian cinema
- List of Algerian films
- Himoud Brahimi
- Hadj Smaine
- Abderrahmane Bouguermouh

=== External links ===
- "Cri de pierre — IMDb". IMDb.
- "Cri de pierre — Africine". Africine.
- "Cri de pierre (Cry of Stone) — MUBI". MUBI.
- "Cri de pierre — Québec Film Index". Government of Quebec.
- "Cri de pierre — CaptainWatch (data)". CaptainWatch.
- "Abderrahmane Bouguermouh (1936–2013) — Africultures". Africultures.
