= Carnaval fi Dachra =

- Directed by: Mohamed Oukassi
- Starring: Othmane Ariouat; Salah Aougrout; Lakhder Boukhers; Mustapha Himoune
- Distributed by: Établissement public de télévision
- Release date: 1994
- Running time: 120 minutes
- Country: Algeria
- Language: Arabic

Carnaval fi Dachra (Arabic: كرنفال في دشرة) is a 1994 Algerian comedy film directed by Mohamed Oukassi.

== plot ==
Makhlouf Bombardier, unusual, decides to be elected mayor of a dechra (village). So he surrounds himself with trusted partners to organize a great campaign for his election. Bombardier became the mayor of the village and is organizing an international film festival to compete at the Carthage festival. In his action, he is pursued by the Court of Auditors for embezzlement. So, his ultimate goal is to become the president.

== Cast ==
- Othmane Ariouat - Makhlouf Bombardier
- Salah Aougrout - Cheikh Brahim
- Khider Hmida - Si Benouna
- Lakhder Boukhers - El Alouch
- Mustapha Himoune - Aissa El Okli
- Hamid Achouri - El Mabrouk
- Atika Toubal - La femme courte

== See also ==
- List of Algerian films
