= La nuit a peur du soleil =

1965 Algerian film

La Nuit a Peur du Soleil
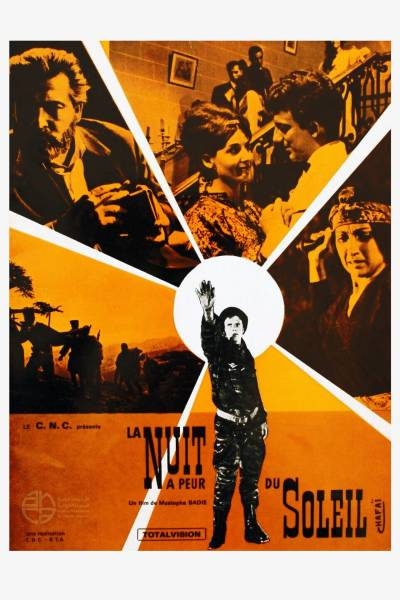
- Poster of La Nuit a Peur du Soleil
- Directed by: Mustapha Badie
- Written by: Mustapha Badie
- Starring: Mustapha Kateb, Taha El Amiri, Sid Ahmed Agoumi, Yasmina
- Production company: RTA / CNC (archives)
- Release date: 1965
- Running time: 195 minutes
- Country: Algiera
- Language: French

La Nuit a Peur du Soleil (transl. The Night Fears the Sun) is an Algerian film directed by Mustapha Badie in 1965. The film is divided into four parts that retrace the chronology of the Algerian War. The film blends group scenes with intimate individual portraits as cinematic approaches..

== Synopsis ==
The film is divided into four parts:

1. The Earth Was Thirsty – portrays colonial oppression.
2. The Roads to Prison – focuses on arrest and repression.
3. The Story of Saliha – follows a woman’s individual journey in the struggle.
4. The Story of Fatma – recounts another heroine’s path up to independence.

These stories alternate between the collective and the personal, illustrating the sacrifices of the Algerian people.

== Production ==
- Title: La Nuit a Peur du Soleil
- Director and writer: Mustapha Badie
- Country: Algeria
- Year: 1965
- Runtime: approximately 195 minutes
- Format: Black and white

== Cast ==
- Mustapha Kateb
- Taha El Amiri
- Sid Ahmed Agoumi
- Yasmina

== See also ==
- Cinema of Algeria
- List of Algerian films
