= Mohamed Sissani =

Sissani
- Born: Mohamed Djediat; September 26, 1920; Algiers, Algeria
- Died: June 29, 2003; Algiers, Algeria
- Other name: Sissani
- Citizenship: Algerian
- Occupations: Actor, production manager
- Notable work: Chronicle of the Years of Fire (1975); Echebka (1976); The Epic of Sheikh Bouamama (1985)

Mohamed Djediat, known as Sissani, is an Algerian actor, with numerous appearances in award-winning films such as Chronique des années de braise or The Epic of Sheikh Bouamama.

== Biography ==
Sissani was born on 26 September 1920, in Algiers. He began his career in theater, participating in numerous theatrical productions. He then embarked on an acting career in the early 1970s. He died on 29 June 2003, succumbing to illness, and was buried in the El Alia cemetery in Algiers.

== Career ==
Sissani took part in historical and social films that shaped Algerian film from the 1970s through the 1980s, as well as later productions.

== Filmography ==
Year	Original / English title	Role (if known)	Notes / Source
1972	Les Vacances de l'inspecteur Tahar	–	
1975	Chronicle of the Years of Fire	–	Major work listed on IMDb / TMDB
1976	Echebka (الشبكة)	–	
1976	Les Déracinés	–	Mentioned in IMDb biography and Africine
1982	Vent de sable	–	Source: TMDB credits
1985	L'Épopée de Cheïkh Bouamama	–	Listed on IMDb
1986	Les Folles Années du twist	Salah's father	
1988	La Citadelle	–	Africultures listing
1989	Le Clandestin	–	Considered his final film role

== See also ==
- Cinema of Algeria
