= Mustapha Ayad =

Algerian actor, writer, and stage director

- Born: 18 June 1948 (age 77); Bologhine, Algiers, Algeria
- Citizenship: Algerian
- Occupations: Actor, writer, stage director
- Notable work: Zabana! Serkadji (film) (see filmography)
- Father: Rouiched

Mustapha Ayad is an Algerian actor, author and director, known for his roles in theatre and cinema as well as for his commitment to preserving Algerian cultural heritage. He is the son of actor Rouiched (Ahmed Ayad) and has appeared in several Algerian films and television films since the 1970s.

== Biography ==
Mustapha Ayad was born in Bologhine (Algiers). Trained at the National Institute of Dramatic Arts, he has pursued a career both on stage and in front of the camera. He has contributed to Algerian theatre as an actor, author and director, and has also published works on cultural memory, including a memoir about his father (Rouiched).

== Cinéma ==
- 1982: Serkadji (film)
- 2006: Barakat! — (crédité : l'épicier)
- 2008: Si Mohand u M'Hand, l'insoumis — (rôle : Kaïd Oukaci)
- 2012: Zabana !
- 2016: Captain Adel (court-métrage)

=== Tv movies ===
- 1978 : Hassan Terro au maquis
- 1982 : Hassan Taxi
- 1989 : Hassan Niya (téléfilm)
- Assia
- Chambre 28
- Le Printemps noir

== Theatre ==
As an actor

- Sans titre
- El Bouaboun — (plays several roles, including the Sonelgaz agent and the rag-and-bone man, 1994 version directed by Rouiched)
- Facebook ya tchoutche

As a director

- Sans titre 2

=== Special features ===
In the play El Bouaboun, Mustapha Ayad performed alongside his father Rouiched and his son Karim Ayad, playing two different characters. The play is considered one of the landmarks of Algerian popular theatre.

== Book ==
Mustapha Ayad, Rouiched mon père, mon ami, Dar El Houda, Algiers, 2017 (ISBN 9789947760024).

== See also ==
- Hassan Taxi
- Cinema of Algeria
- List of Algerian films
- Theatre of Algeria
