= Aziz Degga =

- Born: Abdelaziz Degga; 10 November 1945; Algiers, Algeria
- Died: 12 April 2019; Algiers, Algeria
- Other names: Aziz Degga
- Occupations: Actor, comedian, writer
- Notable work: Omar Gatlato; Cri de Pierre; Le Clandestin; Morituri

Aziz Degga (born Abdelaziz Degga; 10 November 1945 – 12 April 2019) was an Algerian actor, comedian, and writer. He was best known for his humorous and light-hearted roles in Algerian popular cinema, and for portraying the character Moh S’mina in Omar Gatlato (1976–77). He was also the brother of Nasreddine Degga.

== Biography ==
Abdelaziz "Aziz" Degga was born on 10 November 1945 in Algiers, Algeria. He began his artistic career in theatre. In 1967, he joined the drama section of the Conservatory of Algiers. He later transitioned to film and television acting, gaining recognition for his comic roles. Degga was also the author of a short story collection for children.

Aziz Degga died in Algiers on 12 April 2019 at the age of 74, following illness.

== Filmography ==
The following is a non-exhaustive list of films in which Aziz Degga appeared:

Year	Title	Role / Notes
1976–1977	Omar Gatlato (dir. Merzak Allouache)	Role: Moh S’mina
1987	Cri de pierre	Supporting role
1989	Le Clandestin (film, 1989)	Supporting role
1990	De Hollywood à Tamanrasset	Actor
2005	Il était une fois dans l'Oued	Actor
2006	Sombrero	Actor
2007	Morituri	Actor

== Publications ==
- Degga, Aziz. Aziz Degga raconte. Algiers: ANEP Editions, 2007. 100 p. ISBN 9961-756-88-6.

== Legacy and artistic style ==
- Aziz Degga was known for his humorous, light, and relaxed acting style, distinct from dramatic or tragic roles.
- He frequently portrayed characters that brought comic relief to Algerian films, especially in Omar Gatlato.
- Beyond acting, he contributed to Algerian children's literature with his short stories and writings.

== See also ==
- Algerian cinema
- Omar Gatlato
