= Sid Ahmed Agoumi =

Algerian actor (1940–2026)

- سيد أحمد أقومي
- Agoumi in 2020
- Born: Sid Ahmed Méziane; 5 October 1940; Saint-Eugène, Algiers, French Algeria
- Died: 20 September 2026 (aged 85)
- Occupations: Actor, playwright, theatre director
- Children: Samia Meziane

Sid Ahmed Agoumi (Arabic: سيد أحمد أقومي; 5 October 1940 – 20 September 2026) was an Algerian actor, playwright and theatre director.

Agoumi was awarded the male performance prize for "Les Diseurs de Vérité" by Karim Traïda. He died on 20 September 2026, at the age of 85.

== Filmography ==
=== Film ===
- 1968: La Voie by Mohamed Slim Riad
- 1969: Z by Costa-Gavras : le chauffeur personnel
- 1969: Les Hors-la-loi by Tewfik Farès : Slimane
- 1974: Zone interdite by Ahmed Lallem
- 1983: Moissons d'acier by Ghaouti Bendedouche
- 1983: Le Moulin de monsieur Fabre by Ahmed Rachedi
- 1989: Layla, My Reason by Taïeb Louhichi : l'envoyé du Prince
- 1993: Autumn: October in Algiers by Mohammed Lakhdar-Hamina : Yazid
- 1997: L'Autre Côté de la mer by Dominique Cabrera
- 1998: La vie sauve by Alain Raoust
- 1999: Paddy by Gérard Mordillat
- 2000: Les Diseurs de vérité by Karim Traïdia
- 2005: Once Upon a Time in the Oued by Djamel Bensalah : M. Mohamed Sabri
- 2006: Gourbi Palace by Bachir Derrais : Hamid
- 2007: Morituri by Okacha Touita : M. Lankabout
- 2008: Lorsque les Rebelles éthique
- 2009: Llob by Bachir Derrais
- 2010: L'Italien by Olivier Baroux : Mohamed Ben Saoud, le père de Dino
- 2010: Taxiphone: El Maktoub by Mohammed Soudani : Youssouf
- 2011: Beur sur la ville by Djamel Bensalah : le vieux Chibani
- 2012: Black Really Suits You by Jacques Bral : Rachid
- 2013: Cheba Louisa by Françoise Charpiat : Tayeb, le père de Djemila
- 2013: Les Invincibles by Frédéric Berthe : fonctionnaire consulat
- 2016: Timgad by Fabrice Benchaouche : Mokhtar, l'instituteur

=== Television ===
- 1965: La nuit a peur du soleil (The Night Is Afraid of the Sun)
- 1975: Les Enfants de novembre (The Children of November)
- 1980: Kahla Oua Beida (Black and White), directed by Abderrahmane Bouguermouh (television film)
- 1999: La Vocation d'Adrienne (Adrienne's Calling): Mustapha (one episode)
- 2000: Vent de colère (Winds of Anger), directed by Michael Raeburn: Kabril (television film)
- 2003: Simon le juste (Simon the Just), directed by Gérard Mordillat (television film)
- 2007: Avocats et Associés (Lawyers and Associates): Imam Shadili (one episode)
- 2007: Rendez-vous avec le destin (Appointment with Destiny): Inspector Allal
- 2007: La Commune (The Commune): Amir Mahmoud (4 episodes)
- 2008: Djemai Family : Inspector Allal (season 1, episode 3)
- 2008: Indama Tatamarradou El Akhlak (When Morality Rebels)
- 2009: Aïssat Idir (Aïssat Idir)
- 2010: Llob (Llob), directed by Bachir Derrais (10-episode television series)
- 2011: Djemai Family (Djemai Family): Car dealer (season 3, one episode)
- 2012: Les Cinq parties du monde (The Five Parts of the World), directed by Gérard Mordillat: the Niçois (television film)
- 2012: Dar Louzir (The Minister's House), directed by Slaheddine Essid: Merzek
- 2013: Nsibti Laaziza (My Dear Sister-in-Law), directed by Slaheddine Essid: Ayachi (season 3)
- 2014: L'Esprit de famille (The Family Spirit), directed by Frédéric Berthe: Farid Sahel (television film)
- 2015–2021: Sultan Achour 10 (Sultan Achour 10): Minister Qandil
- 2016: B73: Djamal
- 2016: El Assrar (The Secrets)
- 2019: Rais Corso (Captain Corso)
- 2019: AM l'Bac (AM the Baccalaureate)
- 2020: Yemma (Mother): Omar
- 2025: El Ardh (The Earth): Lakhdar

== Theatre ==
His stage credits included:

- 1963: Les Enfants de la Casbah, by Abdelhalim Raïs, directed by Mustapha Kateb.
- 1963: Hayat Helm, an adaptation of Life Is a Dream by Pedro Calderón de la Barca, adapted by Kasdarli and directed by Mustapha Kateb.
- 1963: Hassan Terro, by Rouiched, directed by Mustapha Kateb.
- 1964: Warda Hamra Min Ajli, an adaptation of Red Roses for Me by Seán O'Casey, adapted by Mustapha Kateb and directed by Allel El-Mouhib.
- 1964: Chouyoukh (Les Vieux), written and directed by Ould Abderrahmane Kaki.
- 1964: La Femme rebelle, based on The Taming of the Shrew by William Shakespeare, adapted by Mustapha Kasdarli and directed by Allel El-Mouhib.
- 1966: Anbassa.
- 1968: Le Cadavre encerclé, by Kateb Yacine.
- 1969: Rouge l'aube, by Assia Djebar and Walid Garn, directed by Mustapha Kateb.
- 1980s: Babor Ghraq (Le Bateau coule), by Slimane Benaïssa, alongside Benaïssa and Omar Guendouz. Mustapha Ayad took over Agoumi's role in the 2017 revival.
- 1995: Les Généreux (El Ajouad), by Abdelkader Alloula, directed by Jean-Yves Lazennec, at the Avignon Festival.
- 1995: Le Retour au désert, by Bernard-Marie Koltès, directed by Jacques Nichet, at the Théâtre de la Ville, playing Se and Sablon.
- 2004: L'Homme-poubelle, by Matei Vișniec, directed by Gabriel Garran, at the Théâtre international de langue française.
- 2010: Bonté divine, by Frédéric Lenoir and Louis-Michel Colla, directed by Christophe Lidon, at the Théâtre de la Gaîté-Montparnasse.

He also appeared in Le Foehn, by Mouloud Mammeri, directed by Jean-Marie Boeglin, and in L'Homme aux sandales de caoutchouc, by Kateb Yacine.
