= Yahia Benmabrouk =

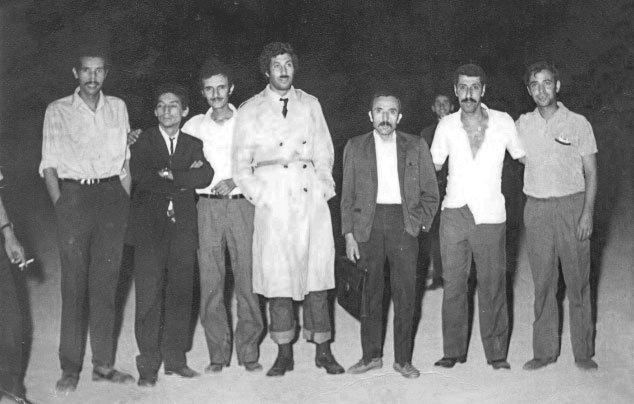
- Hadj Abderrahmane et Yahia Benmabrouk en 1974.
- Born: March 30, 1928; Algiers
- Died: October 8, 2004 (aged 76); Bab El Oued
- Occupations: comedian and film actor
- Notable work: Taxi Mekhfi; The Inspector Tahar

Yahia Benmabrouk (1928–2004) was an Algerian comedian and film actor, born on March 30 on 1928 in Algiers and died on October 8, 2004, in Bab El Oued.

He is best known to the general public for his role of « L’Apprenti » (the apprentice), interpreted in theater, on TV and in films with his friend and associate Hadj Abderrahmane, in “The Inspector Tahar’s” adventures during the late 60s and 70s. The early death of his companion has somehow taken him away from the art scene.

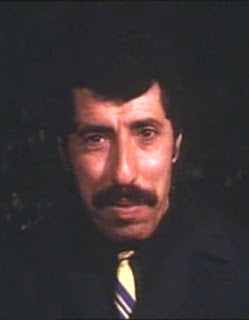
Yahia Benmabrouk in the film: "The Inspector Tahar: Scores The Goal" (French: L'inspecteur Marque le But).

== Biography ==
His start in comedy dates from the 1940s. Quite by chance, he takes the stage to replace ayoung actor who was ill. Their theatrical troupe was composed by young talented comedians who became very quickly famous on the Algerian scene: Hadj Omar, Sid-Ali Kouiret, Allel El Mouhib, Rouiched (M. Ayad), Hadj Chérif, Abdelkader Bougaci, M'Guellati and many others. All these actors will form later El Masrah El Djazairi theatrical troupe, directed by Mustapha Kateb. It was under the latter's supervision that Yahia Benmabrouk really learned the theatrical art.

In 1956 he was targeted by an attack by a Pied-Noir extremist group, during the Algerian war for independence. Traumatized, this attack took him away from the scenes for almost two years; and he left Algeria for France. However, his stay there would be short-lived because of a very important task. In fact, in early 1958, the FLN invited him to join Mohamed Bouzidi H'ssissen, Boualem Rais, Sid Ali Kouiret, Saâdaoui and other artists to form theatrical troupe able to make Algeria famous worldwide and to promote the struggle of the Algerian people freedom.

Yahia Benmabrouk returned to the country by the end of the war and continued to tread the boards among the elements that will constitute the Algerian National Theatre until he retired in the 1980s.

1967 was a decisive year for Yahia Benmabrouk because it marks the birth of the explosive duo: Yahia Ben Mabrouk (L'Apprenti) and Hadj Abderrahmane (L'InspecteurTahar) in the film: « L’Inspecteur Tahar Mène l’Enquète ». And it was followed by many other films.

The tragic death of his friend Hadj Abderrahmane on October 5, 1981, plunged him into a depression. Nothing will be the same for him.

Yahia Benmabrouk died on October 8, 2004, at the age of 76, in the university hospital of Bab-El-Oued.

== Filmography ==
- 1967 : The Inspector Tahar: Leads the investigation.
- 1968 : The Mouse. (La Souris)
- 1968 : La Poursuite infernale.
- 1969 : L’Auberge du pendu.
- 1973 : The Inspector Tahar's Holiday (Les Vacances de l'inspecteur Tahar.)
- 1977 : The Inspector Tahar: Scores The Goal (L'inspecteur marque le but.)
- 1978 : The Inspector Tahar: The Cat (Le chat.)
- 1986 : Une médaille pour Hassan.
- 1991 : Le Clandestin.
- 1993 : The Bus (Le bus.)
- 1999 : L'apprenti's Holiday
