= Eugène Lefebvre (politician) =

French politician

Eugène Lefebvre (9 November 1868, in El Biar – 2 July 1921) was a French politician. He represented the Radical Party in the Chamber of Deputies from 1919 to 1921.
