= Le Démon au féminin =

- Directed by: Hafsa Zinaï Koudil
- Written by: Hafsa Zinaï Koudil
- Produced by: Public Establishment of Television
- Starring: Doudja Achachi; Saïd Amrane; Ahmed Benaïssa; Fatiha Berber; Djamila Haddadi
- Release date: 1994
- Country: Algeria
- Language: French

Le Démon au féminin is a 1994 Algerian film written and directed by Hafsa Zinaï Koudil. The film is based on a true story and deals with violence against women and the practices of ‘exorcism’ committed by fundamentalist groups in Algeria in the 1990s.

== Synopsis ==
In Algeria, amid the rise of fundamentalism in the early 1990s, Ali, a father, becomes convinced that his wife is possessed by a ‘demon’. He then agrees to violent exorcism practices that plunge his wife into a nightmare. The film follows the woman's ordeal and the silent struggle of Algerian women faced with religious and social violence.

== Technical detail ==
Source :

- Director: Hafsa Zinaï Koudil
- Screenplay: Hafsa Zinaï Koudil.
- Production: Public Establishment of Television
- Country: Algeria
- Genre: Drama film
- Year: 1994

== Cast ==
Source :

- Fatiha Berber
- Doudja Achaichi
- Saïd Amrane
- Ahmed Benaïssa
- Djamila Haddadi
- Mustapha Kesdarli

== Production and context ==
Filming took place between September 1992 and March 1993, mainly in 16 mm, initially intended for Algerian television (RTA). The project received public funding, supported by intellectuals such as Tahar Djaout, but its broadcast was subsequently blocked in Algeria due to the political climate and pressure exerted.

== Broadcast and controversy ==
Following the final edit, the authorities refused to allow the film to be broadcast nationally. Hafsa Zinaï Koudil received threats and had to go into temporary exile. This censorship can be explained by the sensitive nature of the subject: the violent exorcism of a woman who refused to wear the hijab, inspired by a real event in 1991 in Algiers, where her attackers received a symbolic sentence. The lack of a stable commercial video release makes copies of the film rare: it circulates mainly through university screenings and festivals.

== Festivals and awards ==
Banned from release in Algeria, the film circulated abroad. It was screened at the Créteil International Women's Film Festival and the Amiens International Film Festival, where it won the Grand Prix du public (Audience Award). These screenings enabled the film to gain international critical acclaim despite the lack of commercial distribution.

== See also ==
- Cinema of Algeria
- Women's rights in Algeria
- List of Algerian films
