= Fatiha Berber =

Algerian actress

- Born: 1945; Casbah of Algiers, Algeria
- Died: January 16, 2015 (aged 69–70)
- Education: Conservatory of Algiers (drama)
- Occupation: Actress
- Years active: 1945-2015
- Television: El la'ib

Fatiha Berber (1945–2015) was an Algerian actress for theater, cinema and television, whose real name was Fatiha Blal.

== Life ==
Fatiha Berber was born in the Casbah of Algiers. Her family came from Legata in the Boumerdès Province of Northern Algeria.

In the late 1950s she sang with the orchestra of Meriem Fekkaï, before studying drama at the Conservatory of Algiers. The director Mustapha Gribi gave her her first role, in an adaptation of Molière, Les femmes savantes. She took part in Algeria's National Liberation struggle.

== Death ==
She died on 16 January 2015 in Paris, following a heart attack.

== Works ==
=== Films ===
- Hassan Taxi, dir. Mohamed Slim Riad, 1982
- Aila Ki Nass, dir. Amar Tribeche, 1990
- Le Démon au féminin [Woman as the Devil], dir. Hafsa Zinaï Koudil, 1994
- Rai, dir. Thomas Gilou, 1995
- Prima del tramonto [Before Sunset], dir. Stefano Incerti, 1999
- Aïd el-Kébir, dir. Karin Albou, 1999

=== Television series ===
- El Masir [Destiny]
- El la'ib [The Player], 2004
- El Badra [The Seed], 2008–10
