= Saïd Ould Khelifa =

Algerian film director and critic (1951)

- Born: Saïd Ould Khelifa; 1951 (age 74–75); Tunisia
- Citizenship: Algerian
- Occupations: Film director, screenwriter, film critic
- Notable work: Zabana! (2012); Le thé d'Ania (2004); Ombres blanches (1991)

Saïd Ould Khelifa (born in 1951) is an Algerian film director, screenwriter and critic. He is best known for his feature films Ombres blanches (1991), Le thé d'Ania (2004) and Zabana ! (2012).

== Biography ==
Saïd Ould Khelifa was born in Tunisia in 1951. He has a doctorate in Cinema & History under the supervision of Marc Ferro at School for Advanced Studies in the Social Sciences (EHESS) (Paris), before directing films, he was active as a film critic and journalist, contributing to magazines and festivals and maintaining a critical activity that was recognised in Algerian and French-speaking circles.

== Career ==
Saïd Ould Khelifa began his career as a critic before moving on to filmmaking. His first feature film was released in the early 1980s, followed by a series of films often dealing with social and historical themes related to contemporary Algeria. He collaborates with Algerian and international screenwriters and actors, and his films have been screened at various festivals.

== Filmography ==
- 1991 : Ombres blanches
- 2004 : Le thé d'Ania
- 2006 : Vivantes ! (A'ichate)
- 2012 : Zabana !

== Awards and reception ==
- The film Zabana! was chosen as Algeria's entry to represent the country at the 2013 Oscars (selection for the 85th ceremony).
- Appearances and mentions in film festivals and reviews (see Unifrance listings and festival archives)

== Algerian press ==
- El Watan — programme announcement (film library) mentioning the film Zabana! : ... Zabana! (2012) by Saïd Ould Khelifa....
- L'Expression — profile/interview: "Saïd Ould Khelifa: cinema in his blood. " (article dated 15 December 2024 reporting on his work as a director and his presence at cultural events).
- L'Expression — review/history (article dated 10 October 2005): mention of Saïd Ould-Khelifa wins award (list of prizes and local festivals for Le Thé d'Ania).
- Al Jazeera (Arabic) — feature/interview: note on the director's commitment and his remarks on historical reconstruction (... supervision of a historical film ... | تصريحات حول الميزانية والعمل التاريخي). Summary excerpt: 'He highlighted the budgetary constraints for historical films.

== See also ==
- Cinema of Algeria
- List of Algerian films
