= Sueur noire =

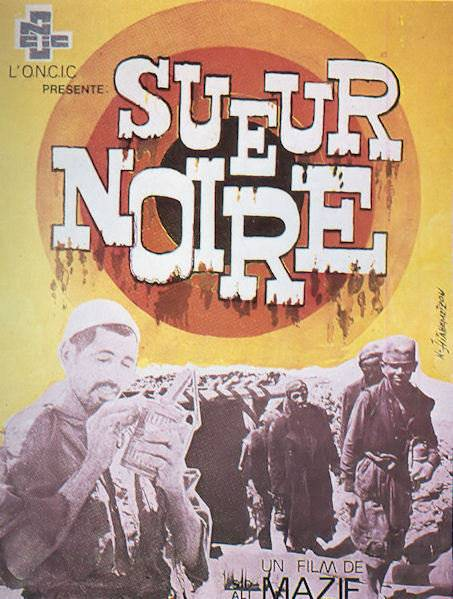
- Poster of the film Sueur noire
- العَرَق الأسود
- Directed by: Sid Ali Mazif
- Screenplay by: Hamid Abdallah; Sid Ali Mazif
- Produced by: Office national pour le commerce et l'industrie cinématographique
- Release date: 1971
- Running time: 100 minutes
- Country: Algeria
- Language: Arabic

Sueur noire (in Arabic: العَرَق الأسود) is a 1971 Algerian film directed by Sid Ali Mazif that was shot in the early 1970s. The film deals with the condition of workers and the repression of a miners strike under colonial rule.

== Synopsis ==
In 1954, in Ouenza, a major mining village in north-eastern Algeria, a minority of European settlers dominate and exploit thousands of Algerian workers. In this context marked by social injustice and segregation, Amine Boularès, a young student arbitrarily expelled from college, is forced to work in the mine.

Confronted with the harsh reality of the working world, he discovers poverty, the division between workers and the paternalism of French technicians. His encounter with Idir, a committed and courageous activist, awakens a new consciousness in him. Together, they oppose the manoeuvres of a colonial administration led by Borsocq, a former military administrator, and denounce union corruption.

When the general strike breaks out, the repression is brutal. But in the midst of this ordeal, the miners become aware of their national identity and the need to unite their struggle with that of the Algerian people for freedom and revolution.

== Technical detail ==
- **Director:** Sid Ali Mazif
- **Screenplay:** Hamid Abdallah and Sid Ali Mazif
- **Original title:** العَرَق الأسود
- **Country:** Algeria
- **Runtime:** 100 minutes
- **Year:** 1971

== Themes ==
The film addresses worker exploitation, political awareness, colonial repression and class solidarity. It is part of a committed post-independence Algerian cinema movement focused on social memory and the representation of popular struggles.

== Production ==
Sueur noire is Sid Ali Mazif's first feature film, made during the early years of Algerian cinema, when the state and several cultural organisations favoured social and historical narratives. It was originally shot in 16 mm and then transferred to 35 mm for certain screenings

== Tributes and screenings ==
- Following the death of director Sid Ali Mazif in May 2023, several tributes and mentions of his work — including Sueur noire — were published by the Algerian press and local film organisations.
- In 2018, the Algerian Film Library organised events commemorating Sid Ali Mazif's work and filmography, highlighting the preservation and promotion of his films.
- Local film festivals and film libraries included Sueur noire in their retrospectives on classic Algerian cinema.

== Reception and posterity ==
In an article devoted to Sid Ali Mazif, the Algeria Press Service (APS) recalls that Sueur noire is one of the films through which the director sought to express the effort, dignity and suffering of the Algerian people at work. The article highlights his sincere view of the condition of the working class and his pioneering role in Algerian social cinema.

The daily newspaper El Moudjahid also paid tribute to the director after his death, recalling that Sueur noire was one of the first feature films to depict the social struggles in the mines of Ouenza and emphasising that it remains a landmark work in the history of socially committed Algerian cinema.

On the Djazairess website, the critic from Le Soir d'Algérie mentions that Sueur noire is an essential milestone in Algerian cinema of the 1970s, powerfully describing the miners strike in Ouenza, the misery of the barracks, the violence of repression and the slow awakening of political consciousness. The article concludes that Mazif has succeeded in translating the transition from social misery to national consciousness.

The cultural website Algeriades lists Sueur noire among the founding films of independent Algerian cinema, noting that it is an emblematic work shot in the iron mine of Ouenza, a symbol of the working class and the collective courage of workers.

Finally, the Izzoran website devotes a page to the film, describing it as an intense social drama in which revolt, solidarity and national awareness gradually emerge as the driving force behind the narrative.

All of these testimonies and analyses confirm the historical importance of Sueur noire in Algerian cinematic memory: a film that is political, human and deeply rooted in the social reality of its time.

== See also ==
- algerian cinema
- List of Algerian films
- Sid Ali Mazif
