= Anouar H. Smaine =

Algerian filmmaker and actor

- Born: 1976 (age 49–50); Algiers, Algeria
- Education: Eastern Michigan University, New York Film Academy
- Occupations: Film director, Film producer, actor, screenwriter
- Years active: 1987–present
- Father: Hadj Smaine
- Website: ahdirector.com

Anouar H. Smaine (born 1976) is an Algerian film director, producer, actor, and screenwriter. He is the son of Algerian playwright and actor Hadj Smaine, and a French professor.

== Personal life ==
Smaine was born in Algiers, Algeria into a family of artists, revolutionaries , and politicians. His mother was a French professor and his father was famous Algerian French Playwright, theatre actor, and director Hadj Smaine (The Battle of Algiers, The Eastern Platoon, November's Children, and Festival de Cannes Golden Palm Winner Chronicles of the years of Fire). Due to the nature of his father's work in film and theatre, Smaine grew up traveling between the cities of Algiers, Constantine, and Paris before moving to the United States in his teen years. For him, the early 1990s were times of uncertainty, reflection, and even confusion as his native country of Algeria sank into a violent civil war which claimed the lives of hundreds of thousands of people amongst which were many of his father's artist friends, journalists, and intellectuals making him fear for the life of his own father for over a decade. Having lost some family members as well as childhood friends in the Algerian civil war, Anouar often wondered about how to contribute to promoting tolerance and peace among people and around the world. Being a filmmaker helps him to attempt just that.

== Education ==
Anouar H. Smaine received his B.A. in Computer Information Systems and Business Administration from Eastern Michigan University and two master's degrees in Arts and Public Administration/Political Science from Eastern Michigan University. He also attended film school at the New York Film Academy in Los Angeles, California and received his training in directing, producing and screenwriting.

== Career ==
Anouar H. Smaine's immersion in the arts and film in particular, started at a very early age. As both his parents were busy with their respective careers, his father would often take him to different film sets and play rehearsals he was involved in. At the age of 9 he took his first acting steps in Cri de pierre (Translated as "Cry of Stone"); a social drama. In Paris, Anouar H. Smaine learned more about the impact of the arts on the human condition, human history and world cultures. Under the influence of his father and some artists who were family friends, he became more acquainted and drawn into the world of theater and drama (among those are French playwright Henri Cordereaux, comedian Hassan Belhadj, and international painter Jean Pierre Bellan). After moving to the US and completing all of his formal education, he began a long and arduous journey of collaborating with a diverse array of filmmakers in Los Angeles. His writing, directing, producing, and acting included different films amongst which are "Axis of Evil", "Honor Among Thieves", "Reign", "Sharia", "12 Strong", and the latest "Battle Fields" in which he brings to the big screen the story of a US veteran of the Iraq war (played by Sean Stone - son of film director Oliver Stone) and an Iraqi driver living in Los Angeles as a refugee (played by Anouar H. Smaine himself). The film aims to raise awareness about post traumatic stress disorder (PTSD) in veterans and civilians alike and also attempts to highlight the humanity that exists in people regardless of race, faith, or nationality.

== Filmography ==
- Cri de pierre (1986) as Reda
- Axis of Evil (2010) as Hossam
- Reign (2012) as Faisal
- Sharia (2014) as Robert Brooks
- Honor Among Thieves (2013) as Vincent
- Battle Fields (2017) as Rasheed Al Mashta
- 12 Strong (2018) as Talib
- Fruit of my Honor (2018) as Nabeel
- Axis of Evil (2010) (as writer, producer, director)
- Menages (2011) (as producer)
- Honor Among Thieves (2013) (as producer)
- Screw it (2010) (as producer)
- Sharia (2014) (as producer, director, writer)
- Battle Fields (2017) (as writer, director, producer)
- Mosul (2018) (Actor)
- The Balad of lefty Brown (2018) (Actor)
- John Wick 3 (2019) (Actor)
- Extraction (2019) (Actor)
- J'ai perdu mon corps (2019) (Actor) Academy Awards 2020
- Superman and Lois (2020) (Actor)
- The Life Ahead (2020) (Actor) Academy Awards 2021
- Giant Robot Brothers (2021) (Actor)
- Kiss the 6th Sense (2022) (Director of dubbing)
- Robbing Mussolini (2021) (Director of dubbing)
- First Love (2022) (Director of dubbing)
- Era Ora (2023) (Director of dubbing)
- Chokehold (2023) (Director of dubbing)
- Fauda (2023) (Director of dubbing)
- FBI International (2022, 2023) (Actor)
- Terminal List (2023) (Actor)
- Extraction 2 (2023) (Actor)
- John Wick 4 (2023) (Actor)
- Indiana Jones and the Dial of Destiny (2023) (Actor)
