= Le Refus =

The Refusal
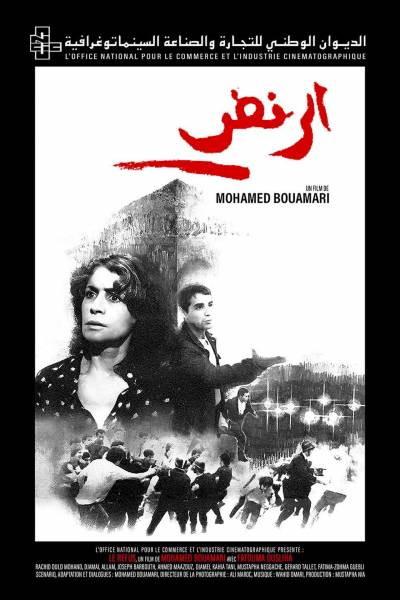
- Poster
- الرفض
- Directed by: Mohamed Bouamari
- Written by: Mohamed Bouamari
- Produced by: ONCIC (National Center for Algerian Cinema)
- Starring: Fettouma Ousliha-Bouamari; Djamel Allam; Rachid Ould Mohand; Joël Barbouth; Ahmed Mazouz; Mustapha Neggache; Fatima-Zohra Guebli
- Music by: Wahid Omari
- Release date: 1982
- Running time: 98 minutes
- Country: Algeria
- Languages: French, Arabic

The Refusal (in Arabic: الرفض) is an Algerian film by director Mohamed Bouamari released in 1982. With Fettouma Ousliha-Bouamari in the main role, the film addresses the themes of immigration, cultural identity and the social and political repercussions suffered by the Algerian diaspora..

== Synopsis ==
In 1971, the nationalization of hydrocarbons by the Algerian government deeply disrupts the life of the Algerian community in France. The Galti family finds itself directly affected by these changes. Khaled, the father, a former militant of the FLN in exile, bears the full consequences of this new situation. At his side, Sharazade, his wife and former comrade in struggle, struggles between her responsibilities as a mother, her role as a wife, and the nostalgia of a homeland and a past now far away. Their son Karim, caught between conflicting identities and cultures, finds no other path than refusal itself.

== Technical details ==
- Original title: Le Refus (الرفض / Al-Raft)
- Director: Mohamed Bouamari
- Screenplay: Mohamed Bouamari
- Music: Wahid Omari
- Production: ONCIC
- Country: Algeria
- Language: French / Arabic
- Runtime: 98 minutes
- Year: 1982

== Cast ==
- Fettouma Ousliha-Bouamari
- Djamel Allam
- Rachid Ould Mohand
- Joël Barbouth
- Ahmed Mazouz
- Mustapha Neggache
- Fatima-Zohra Guebli

== Production and context ==
The film was produced by ONCIC, the Algerian National Cinema Center, and follows Mohamed Bouamari’s artistic trajectory after Premier Pas. It explores the themes of exile, the aftereffects of war, and the question of identity.

== See also ==
=== Related articles ===
- Mohamed Bouamari
- Fettouma Ousliha-Bouamari
- List of Algerian films

=== External links ===
- The Refusal on Letterboxd
- The Refusal on IMDb
- The Refusal on Africiné
- The Refusal on Africultures
- The Refusal on Programme-TV
- The Refusal on Captain Watch
