= Hadj Abderrahmane =

Algerian actor

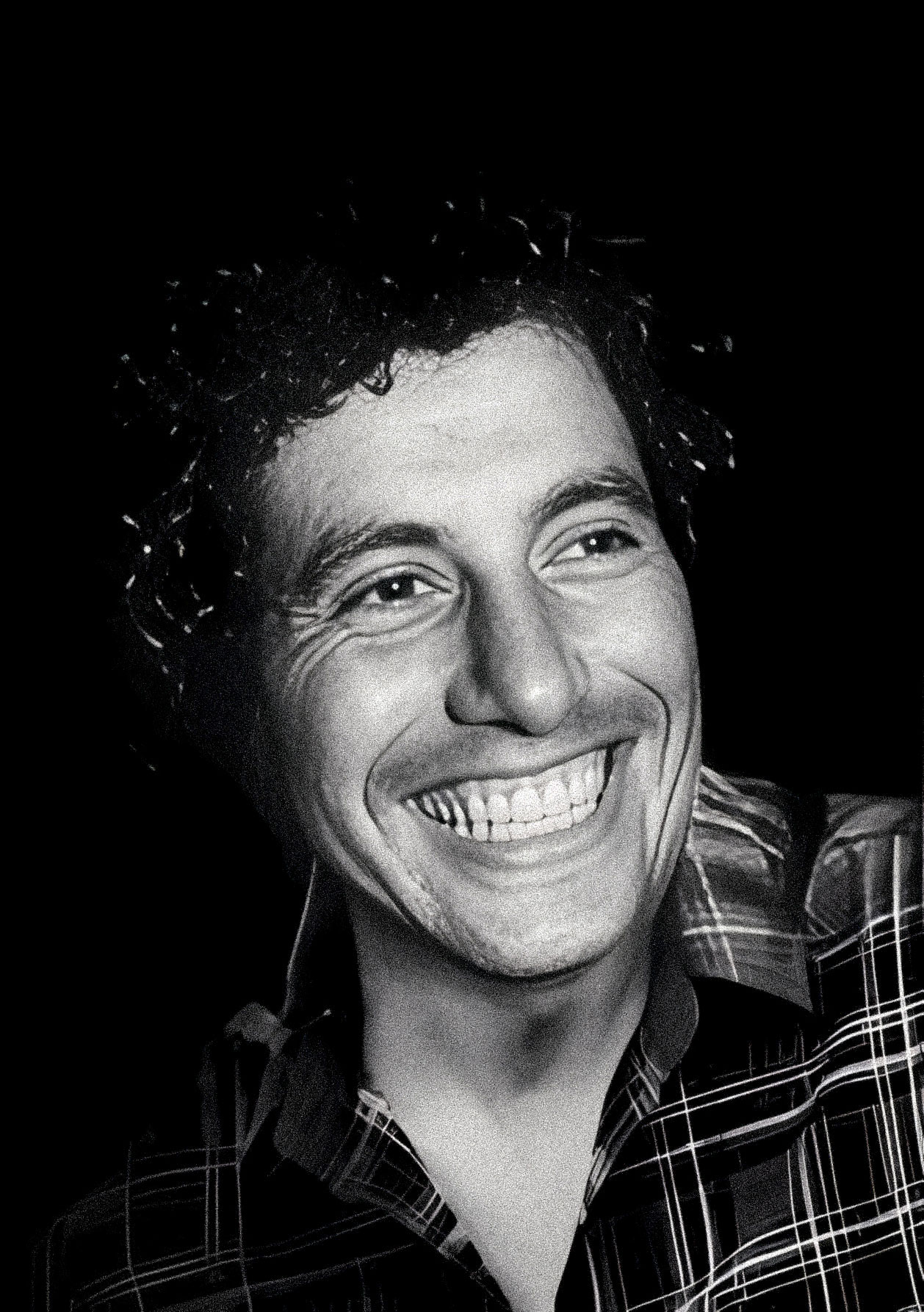
- Born: 12 October 1941; Télemly, Algiers, Alger Department, France
- Died: 5 October 1981 (aged 39); Paris, France
- Occupation: Actor
- Notable work: Inspector Tahar scors the goal

not to be confused with Slimane Hadj Abderrahmane

Hadj Abderrahmane (Arabic:حاج عبد الرحمان; October 12, 1941 - October 5, 1981) was an Algerian actor from Télemly, Algiers. He was best known for his portrayal of The Inspector Tahar alongside his shorter sidekick Yahia Ben Mabrouk, in The Adventures of Inspector Tahar film comedy series in the late 1960s and 1970s.

== Biography ==
Abderrahmane began as a technical operator and cameraman. Before embarking on the adventures of Inspector Tahar, he appeared in the theatre with Allel El Mouhib, who was his drama teacher.

Abderrahmane played the monk in the play Montserrat by Emmanuel Robles. He was a parish priest in Fusils de la mère Carare. His social life, his childhood, his nature, and his deepest feelings were related to the drama but the performance was seen as comical overall.

In 1967 he starred as Inspector Taher in the film L'Inspecteur mène l'enquête, directed by Moussa Haddad which spawned several sequels, including The Inspector Tahar's Holiday (Les Vacances de l'inspecteur Tahar) (1973) and The Inspector Tahar Scores The Goal (L'inspecteur marque le but) (1977).

He was preparing to shoot Le cadavre du domaine when he died on October 5, 1981, in Paris.

== Filmography ==
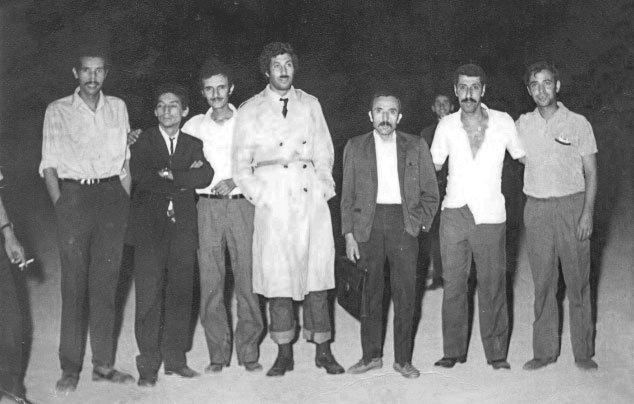
Hadj Abderrahmane and Yahia Benmabrouk in 1974.

- The Inspector leads the investigation - 1967 Moustapha Badie
- La Souris - 1968
- La Poursuite - 1968
- Inspector Tahar's Holiday - 1973
- The Inspector Tahar Scores The Goal - 1977
- The cat - 1978
