= Moissons d'acier =

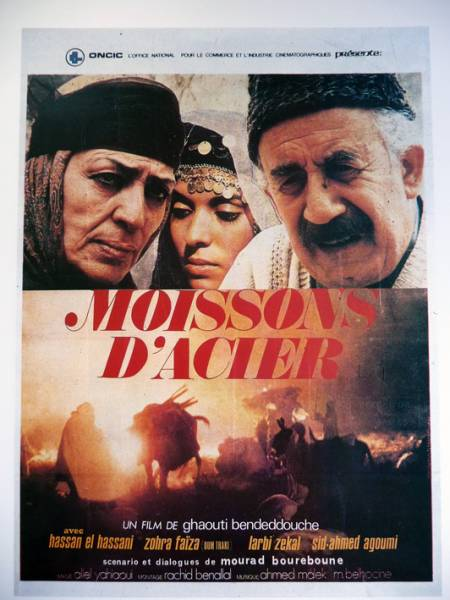
- Poster
- Directed by: Ghaouti Bendedouche
- Written by: Mourad Bourboune
- Starring: Sid Ahmed Agoumi; Ziani Chérif Ayad; Zohra Bent Youcef; Hassan El-Hassani; Larbi Zekkal; Amar Ouadda; Chafia Benboudriou
- Release date: 1983
- Running time: 95 minutes
- Country: Algeria
- Language: Arabic

Moissons d'acier is a 1983 Algerian film directed by Ghaouti Bendedouche.

The film depicts the aftermath of war in a mined border village, where the population struggles to rebuild their lives despite the constant threat of explosives.

== Synopsis ==
Years after independence, the war continues to claim victims in Soulima, a border village completely surrounded by mines. Despite deaths and fear, the inhabitants remain deeply attached to their land. At the heart of the story is Zohra, a central figure of the community, and the way the threat of the “moissons d'acier” (steel harvests — mines) shapes the villagers’ daily lives.

== Technical details ==
- Director: Ghaouti Bendedouche
- Screenplay: Mourad Bourboune
- Country: Algeria
- Year: 1983
- Runtime: 95 minutes (some sources indicate 95'; others list 60 minutes — see notes)

== Cast ==
- Sid Ahmed Agoumi
- Ziani Chérif Ayad
- Zohra Bent Youcef
- Hassan El-Hassani
- Larbi Zekkal
- Amar Ouadda

== Awards and recognition ==
According to several online sources, Moissons d'acier received the First Prize (Golden Sword) at the Damascus Film Festival in 1983.

== See also ==
- List of Algerian films
- Algerian War
