= Leila Shenna =

Moroccan actress

Leila Shenna ليلى شنّا
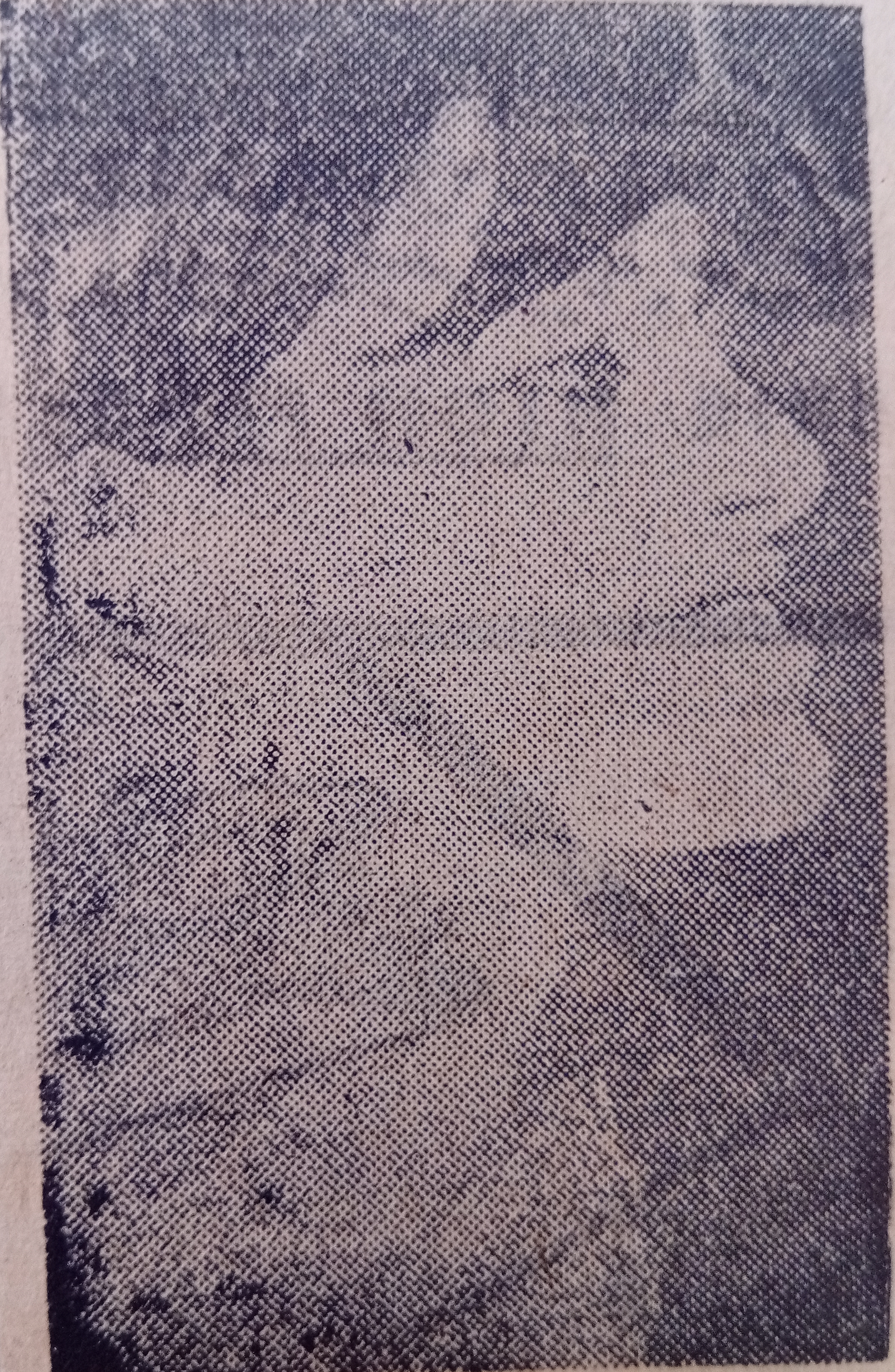
- Born: Casablanca, Morocco
- Other name: Leilah Shenna
- Occupation: Actress
- Years active: 1968—1982
- Relatives: Mohamed Oufkir (uncle); Malika Oufkir (cousin)

Leila Shenna (Arabic: ليلى شنّا; born Morocco) is a Moroccan former actress who featured on film mostly in the 1970s.

== Biography ==
Shenna is most commonly remembered in English speaking countries for her Bond girl role in the 1979 film Moonraker as an evil air hostess. However, she also starred in the 1968 film Remparts of Clay (initially released in Italy, later released in the United States in 1970 under the title Ramparts of Clay) directed by Jean-Louis Bertucelli, the 1975 Palme d'Or winner Chronicle of the Years of Fire directed by Mohammed Lakhdar-Hamina, as well as the 1982 Algerian film Sandstorm, also directed by Lakhdar-Hamina. The first two films were set in Algeria, the third simply in the desert. She also had a minor role in the 1977 film March or Die.

Shenna is the cousin of Malika Oufkir, the writer of Stolen Lives: Twenty Years in a Desert Jail, an account of the failed 1972 assassination attempt on King Hassan II of Morocco by her father (and Shenna's uncle), General Mohamed Oufkir.

== Filmography ==
- Win to Live (1968)
- Ramparts of Clay (1970) – Rima
- Sex-Power (1970) – La Sirène
- Décembre (1973)
- Chronicle of the Years of Fire (1975) – La Femme
- El Chergui (1975)
- Château Espérance (1976, TV Series) – Leila Benayout
- March or Die (1977) – Arab Street Girl
- Désiré Lafarge (1977, TV Series) – Aïcha
- Moonraker (1979) – Hostess
- Sandstorm (1982) – (final film role)
