= Black Really Suits You =

- Film poster
- Le noir (te) vous va si bien
- Directed by: Jacques Bral
- Written by: Jacques Bral
- Produced by: Jacques Bral
- Starring: Sofiia Manousha; Lounès Tazairt; Julien Baumgartner; Grégoire Leprince-Ringuet
- Cinematography: François Lartigue
- Edited by: Jean Dubreuil
- Music by: Nathaniel Méchaly
- Production company: Thunder Films International
- Distributed by: Thunder Films International
- Release date: 5 December 2012
- Running time: 88 minutes
- Country: France
- Language: French

Black Really Suits You (original title: Le noir (te) vous va si bien) is a 2012 French film written, directed and produced by Jacques Bral. The film was Bral’s last directorial effort.

== Plot ==
Cobra is the daughter of a Muslim immigrant family in France. Her father Moncef wants to marry her to a Muslim. Her boss is in love with her. She wants to choose herself. One day a friend of her father surprises her in the café where she uses to change her clothes and take off her veil after she leaves home.

== Cast ==
- Sofia Manousha : Cobra
- Lounès Tazairt : Moncef
- Julien Baumgartner : Serge
- Grégoire Leprince-Ringuet : Richard
- Élise Lhomeau : Anaïs
- Souad Amidou : Maléké
- Salim Kechiouche : Rachid
- Thierry Lhermitte : François
- Sid Ahmed Agoumi : Julien
- Delphine Rich : Hélène-Laure
- Magid Bouali : Majid
- Lisa Makhedjouf : Salima

== Accolades ==
Award / Film Festival	Category	Recipients and nominees	Result
Lumière Awards	Most Promising Actress	Sofiia Manousha	Nominated
