= Ramparts of Clay =

1971 film

- Film poster
- Directed by: Jean-Louis Bertuccelli
- Written by: Jean-Louis Bertuccelli; Jean Duvignaud
- Produced by: Mohammed Lakhdar-Hamina
- Starring: Leila Shenna
- Cinematography: Andréas Winding
- Release date: 1971
- Running time: 80 minutes
- Country: France
- Language: French

Ramparts of Clay (French: Remparts d'argile) is a 1971 French drama film directed by Jean-Louis Bertuccelli. The film stars Leila Shenna, as well as the villagers of the Algerian village of Tehouda. The film was selected as the French entry for the Best Foreign Language Film at the 44th Academy Awards, but was not accepted as a nominee.

The film tells the story of a young woman (played by Shenna), who tries to free herself from the role imposed on her by the village culture. It explores the exploitation of the rural Tunisian people, though it was filmed in an Algerian village.

== Cast ==
- Leila Shenna as Young Woman

== See also ==
- List of submissions to the 44th Academy Awards for Best Foreign Language Film
- List of French submissions for the Academy Award for Best Foreign Language Film
