= Hassan Taxi =

1982 Algerian comedy film

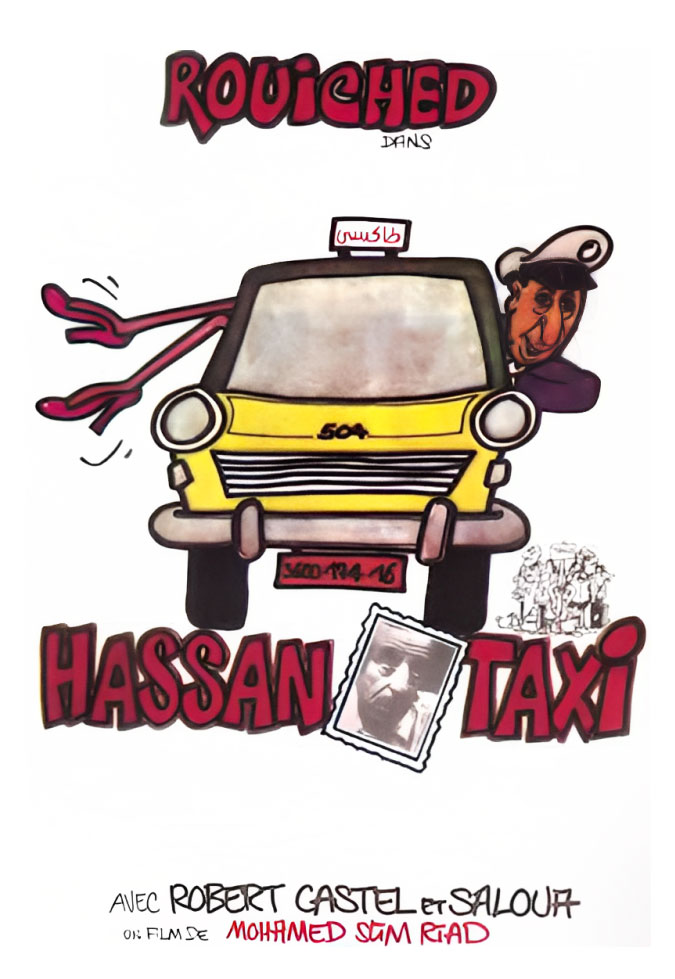
- Directed by: Mohamed Slim Riad
- Screenplay by: Rouiched
- Starring: Rouiched; Robert Cestel; Mustapha Chougranu; Fatiha Berber
- Release date: 1982
- Running time: 110 minutes
- Country: Algeria
- Language: Arabic

Hassan Taxi (Arabic: حسان طاكسي) is a 1982 Algerian Arabic-language comedy film directed by Mohamed Slim Riad.

== Cast ==
- Rouiched as Hassan Terro
- Robert Cestel
- Fatiha Berber
- Mustapha Chougrani
- Lucette Sahuquet
- Seloua
- Mustapha Ayad

== Synopsis ==
Hassan Terro (Rouiched) who is exhausted and worn out by the long years of post-independence gets a taxi license as a former fighter travelling through the streets of Algiers, the capital of Algeria and experiences the most incredible adventures in humorous sense.
