= El Biar =

El Biar الأبيار ⵍⴻⴱⵢⴰⵔ
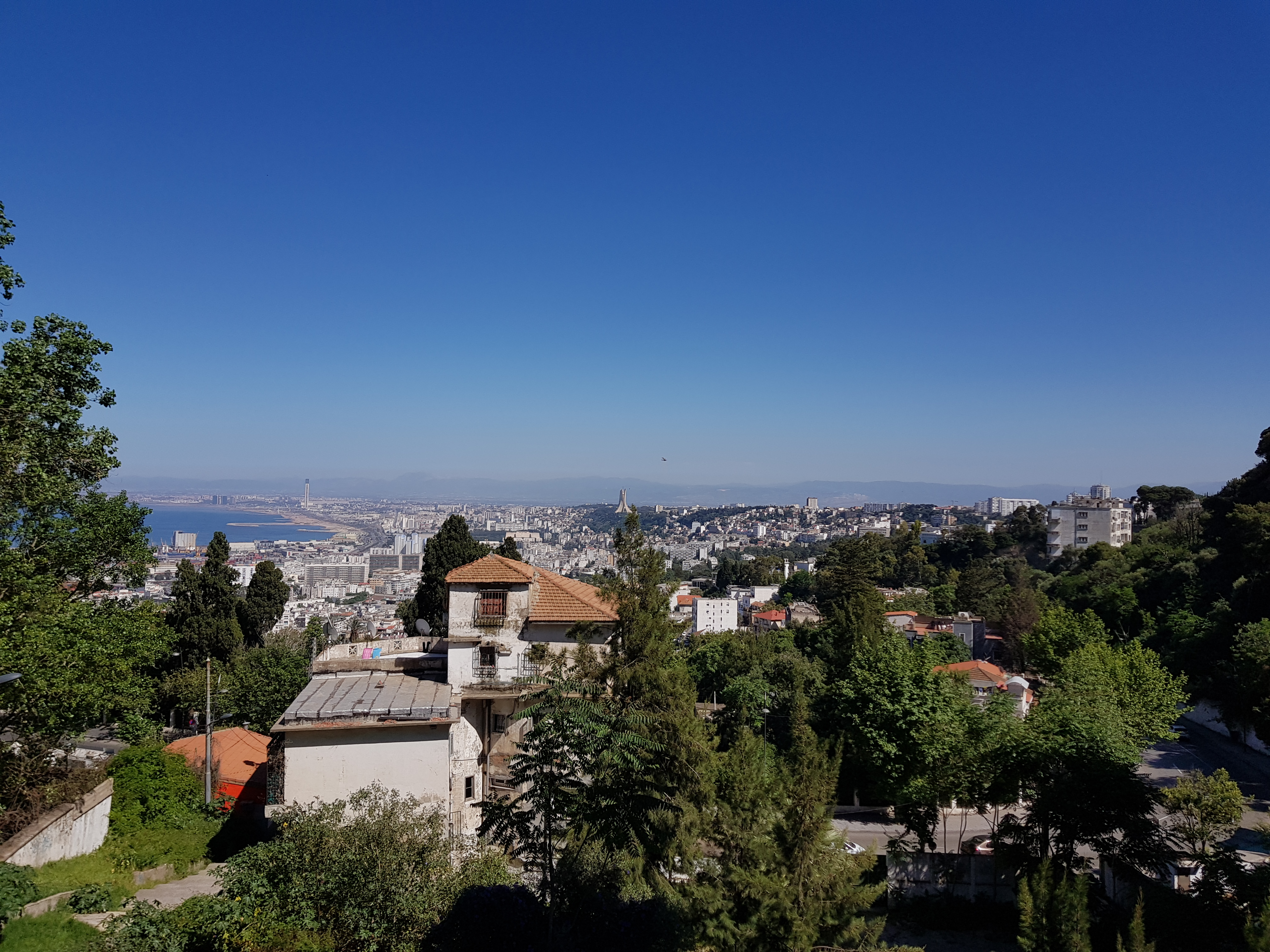

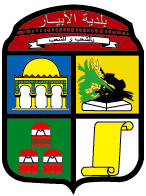
- Seal

- Location within Algeria
- Coordinates: 36.769069°N 3.029684°E
- Country: Algeria
- Province: Algiers

Population (1998)
  - Total: 52,582
- Postal code: 16030

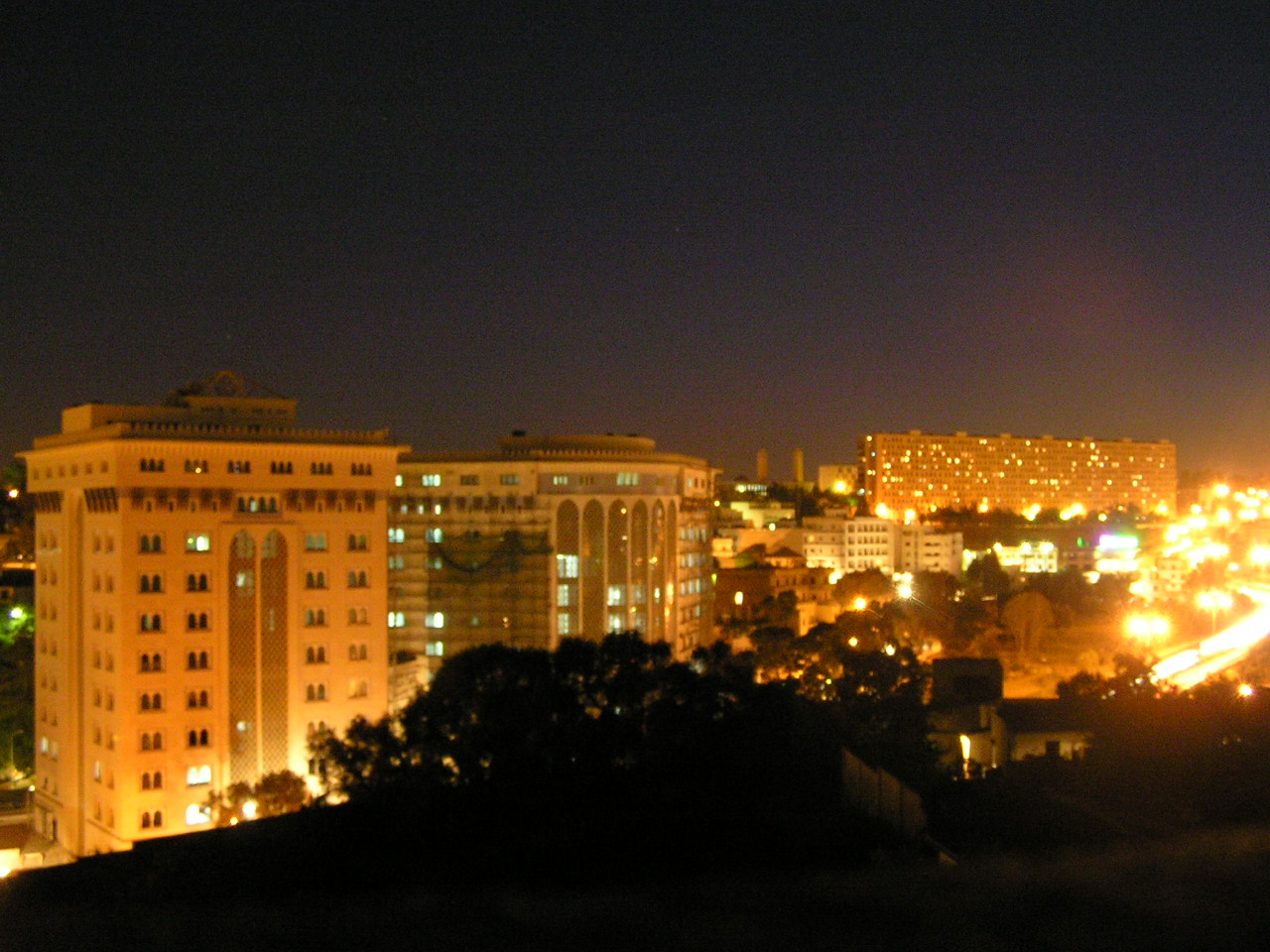
Ministry of Energy and Mining in El Biar by night

El Biar (from Arabic "الأبيار", meaning "The Wells") is a suburb of Algiers, Algeria. It is located in the administrative constituency of Bouzaréah in the Algiers Province. As of the 1998 census, it has a population of 52,582 inhabitants. The suburb's postal code is 16030 and its municipal code is 1610.

== Buildings ==
- Villa Susini

== Notable people ==
- René Aleman (1913–1989), French weightlifter
- Khalil Boukedjane, football player
- Abdelaziz Bouteflika (1937–2021), 5th President of Algeria (1999–2019)
- Saïd Bouteflika, Algerian politician and academic, brother of Abdelaziz Bouteflika
- Eldridge Cleaver (1935–1998), civil rights leader & author
- Jacques Derrida (1930–2004), philosopher
- Dahmane El Harrachi, chaabi singer
- Marcelle Laloë, (1884–1974), wife of Hàm Nghi
- Hàm Nghi, eighth Emperor of the Vietnamese Nguyễn Dynasty
- Mohamed Hamdoud, football player
- Tarek Lazizi, retired football player
- Djamel Menad, retired football player
- Lahcène Nazef, football player
- Abderrahmane Nekli, diplomat
- Issam Nima, long jumper
- Georges Rochegrosse, French painter
- Rouiched, actor and comedian
- Mustapha Ayad, actor and comedian
- Moïse Tshombe, Congolese politician put under house arrest

== Government and infrastructure ==
The Transport Ministry has its head office in El Biar.
