= Meriem Fekkaï =

Algerian musician (1889–1961)

Meriem Fekkai (Arabic: مريم فكاي) (1889 - July 18, 1961) sometimes spelled Fekai, was an Algerian singer.

Fekkai came from a Jewish family born and raised in Biskra, Algiers, where she developed her musical career. She began her singing career rather late, but had great success at the time. She played the Hawzii of Arab-Andalusian music and set to music many poems of the Algerian directory.
