= Jacques Bral =

French film director and screenwriter (1948–2021)

- Born: 21 September 1948; Tehran, Imperial State of Iran
- Died: 17 January 2021 (aged 72); Paris, France
- Occupations: Film Director; Screenwriter

Jacques Bral (21 September 1948 – 17 January 2021) was a French film director, screenwriter, and producer. He was also a painter.

== Biography ==
After his studies at Alborz High School in Tehran, Bral left Iran in 1966 for France. From 1966 to 1968, he studied architecture at Beaux-Arts de Paris and codirected the short film Quand tout le monde est parti with Julien Lévi and Jean-Paul Leca. He then directed feature films M-88 in 1970 and Frisou in 1973, both in black and white. In 1975, he directed Une baleine qui avait mal aux dents, which starred Francis Blanche and Bernadette Lafont.

In 1978, Bral founded the production company Les Films Noirs, which was responsible for the release of Extérieur, nuit in 1980. It was remastered for the Lumière Film Festival in Lyon in 2009, and a rerelease into theaters occurred on 27 June 2010.

In 1984, Bral directed the film Polar, which was an adaptation of the novel Morgue plein by Jean-Patrick Manchette. In 1989, he produced Street of No Return, the final feature film in the career of American director Samuel Fuller. His poetic fable Mauvais garçon was released in 1993.

After directing many films, Bral focused on screenwriting, and served as both director and screenwriter for the film Un printemps à Paris, which won the Grand Prize at the Police Paris New York Film Festival in 2007. In 2012, he directed and produced Black Really Suits You, a cross-cultural romantic tragedy.

Jacques Bral died in Paris on 17 January 2021 at the age of 72.

== Filmography ==
=== Director ===
- Une baleine qui avait mal aux dents (1974)
- Extérieur, nuit (1980)
- Polar (1984)
- Mauvais Garçon (1993)
- Un printemps à Paris (2006)
- Black Really Suits You (2012)

=== Writer ===
- Une baleine qui avait mal aux dents (1974)
- Extérieur, nuit (1980)
- Polar (1984)
- Street of No Return (1989)
- Mauvais Garçon (1993)
- Un printemps à Paris (2006)
- Black Really Suits You (2012)

=== Actor ===
- Quelques hommes de bonne volonté (1983)
- L'Embellie (1995)
