= Sandstorm (1982 film) =

1982 film

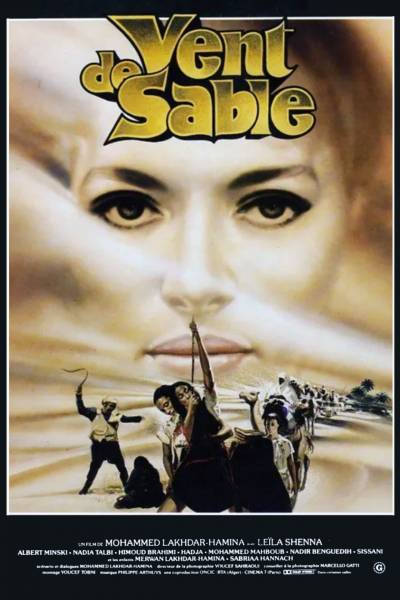
- French theatrical release poster
- Directed by: Mohammed Lakhdar-Hamina
- Written by: Mohammed Lakhdar-Hamina; Yamina Bachir
- Starring: Nadir Benguedih
- Cinematography: Youcef Sahraoui
- Release date: May 1982
- Running time: 103 minutes
- Country: Algeria
- Language: French

Sandstorm (French: Vent de sable, Arabic: رياح رملية, translit. Rih al-raml) is a 1982 Algerian drama film directed by Mohammed Lakhdar-Hamina. It was entered into the 1982 Cannes Film Festival. The film was also selected as the Algerian entry for the Best Foreign Language Film at the 55th Academy Awards, but was not accepted as a nominee.

== Cast ==
- Nadir Benguedih
- Himoud Brahimi
- Hadja
- Sabrina Hannach
- Merwan Lakhdar-Hamina
- M. Mahboub
- Albert Minski
- Leila Shenna
- Mohamed Sissani
- Nadia Talbi

== See also ==
- List of submissions to the 55th Academy Awards for Best Foreign Language Film
- List of Algerian submissions for the Academy Award for Best Foreign Language Film
