= Hafsa Zinaï Koudil =

Algerian filmmaker and novelist

- Born: September 13, 1951 (age 74); Aïn Beïda, Oum El Bouaghi, French Algeria
- Occupation: Novelist
- Writing career
- Language: French

Hafsa Zinaï Koudil (born 1951) is an Algerian novelist, journalist and film director living in France.

== Life ==
Hafsa Zinaï Koudil was born on 13 September 1951 in Aïn Beïda in the East of Algeria.

She worked for Radiodiffusion Télévision Algérienne until dispute over her first 16mm feature film. Le Démon au féminin dramatised the true story of Latifa, a confident professional Algerian who refused to wear a headscarf. At the request of her husband, Latifa was violently exorcised by Islamic fundamentalists in 1991: her torture lasted for six hours, leaving her with injuries which confined her to a wheelchair. While shooting the film between September 1992 and January 1993, Hafsa Zinaï Koudil received death threats. After an attempted kidnapping, she fled into exile in Tunisia and was followed by her family. She needed a police escort at the Amiens International Film Festival, where her film shared the Prix du Public.

== Works ==
=== Novels ===
- La fin d'un rêve [The end of a dream], 1984
- Le pari perdu [The lost bet], 1986
- Papillon ne volera plus [The butterfly will no longer fly], 1990
- Le passé décomposé [The imperfect past], 1992.
- Sans voix [Voiceless], 1997

=== Films ===
- Le Démon au féminin / al-Shaytan imra`a [Woman as the devil], 1993/1994.
