= List of Algerian films =

This is a list of films produced in Algeria.

== Award-winning Algerian films ==
Film	Directed	Release dates	Language	Film genre	Awards
The Battle of Algiers (معركة الجزائر)	Gillo Pontecorvo	1966	Arabic, French	historical war film	(Italy) Golden Lion
The Winds of the Aures (ريح الاوراس)	Mohammed Lakhdar-Hamina	1966	Arabic, French	drama war film	(France) Festival de Cannes
Z (زاد)	Costa-Gavras	1969	French, Russian, English	political thriller	(United States) Academy Award (United States) Golden Globe Award
L'Opium et le Bâton (الأفيون والعصا)	Ahmed Rachedi	1971	Arabic, French	drama war film	(Russia) 7th Moscow International Film Festival
Chronicle of the Years of Fire (وقائع سنين الجمر)	Mohammed Lakhdar-Hamina	1975	Arabic, French	drama Historical film	(France) Palme d'Or
Omar Gatlato (عمر قتلتوا الرجلة)	Merzak Allouache	1976	Arabic, French	drama film	(Confederate States of America) The Karlovy Vary International Film Festival
The Epic of Cheikh Bouamama (الشيخ بوعمامة)	Benamar Bakhti	1985	Arabic	historical war film	(Portugal) Festroia Festival
La Citadelle (قلعة)	Mohamed Chouikh	1989	Arabic	comedy film	(Portugal) Festroia Festival
Bab El-Oued City (باب الواد سيتي)	Merzak Allouache	1994	Algerian Arabic	drama film	(Belgium) FIPRESCI Award
Dust of Life (غبار الحياة)	Rachid Bouchareb	1995	French	drama film	(United States) Young Artist Award
Inch'Allah Dimanche (إن شاء الله الأحد)	Yamina Benguigui	2001	Algerian, Kabyle, French	drama film	(Canada) Toronto Festival
Rachida (رشيدة)	Yamina Bachir	2002	Arabic, French	drama, Civil War film	(England) London Film Festival
Days of Glory (بلديون)	Rachid Bouchareb	2006	Arabic, French	drama war film	(France) Cannes
Outside the Law (خارجون عن القانون)	Rachid Bouchareb	2010	Arabic, French	drama film	(Syria) Arab Film Festival Damascus
The Repentant (التائب)	Merzak Allouache	2012	Arabic	drama film	(India) FIPRESCI Award
L'Oranais (الوهراني)	Lyes Salem	2014	Arabic, French	Drama Historical film	(United Arab Emirates) Abu Dhabi Film Festival
Rome plutôt que vous (روما ولا نتوما)	Tariq Teguia	2006	French	Drama film	(Switzerland) Fribourg International Film Festival

== A ==
- À l'ombre des chênes (1974)
- Adhilai al beida (1991)
- Al-Salam Al-Walid (1965), also known as So Young a Peace
- Algérie, entre douleur et liberté (2000)
- Ali au pays des mirages (1981), also known as Ali fi bilad al-sarab or Ali in Wonderland (1978)
- Aliénations (2004)
- Après-Octobre, L' (1989)
- Arc-en-ciel éclaté, L' (1998), also known as The Blown-out Rainbow
- Arche du désert, L' (1998)
- Asfour, al- (1972), also known as The Sparrow
- Asino d'oro: processo per fatti strani contro Lucius Apuleius cittadino romano, L' (1970)
- Attente des femmes, L' (2001)
- Aube des damnés, L' (1966), also known as Dawn of the Damned
- Automne... Octobre à Alger (1993)
- Autre monde, L' (2001), also known as Other World, The (2004) (USA: literal English title)
- Aveux les plus doux, Les (1971)
- Awdat al ibn al dal (1976), also known as Return of the Prodigal Son, The (1976)
- Aziza (1980)
- Aïd El Kebir (1999)

== B ==
- Bab El-Oued City (1994)
- Bab el web (2005)
- Bal, Le (1983)
- Barakat! (2006)
- Battaglia di Algeri, La (1966), also known as Battle of Algiers, The (1967) (USA)
- Beur blanc rouge (2006)
- Blouson vert, Le (1998)
- Bonnes familles, Les (1972)
- Brancaleone alle crociate (1970)
- Buamama (1985)
- " Bouts de vies, Bouts de rêves" Hamid Benamra 2012 JCC- Fespaco

== C ==
- Camp de Thiaroye (1987)
- Cheb (1991)
- Chemins de l'oued, Les (2002), also known as Under Another Sky
- Chronique des années de braise (1975)
- Clan destin (1999)
- Colline oubliée, La (1997)
- Communiqué, Le (1969)
- Couleurs d'enfants (1994)
- Cousines (2004)

== D ==
- Delice Paloma (2007)
- Dernière image, La (1986)
- De la vie des amateurs 1982 Hamid Benamra
- Douar de femmes (2005), also known as Hamlet of Women
- Dounia (1998)
- Décembre (1972)
- Dévoilée femme, La (1998)

== E ==
- Eldridge Cleaver (1970)
- Enfer à dix ans, L' (1968)
- Élise ou la vraie vie (1970)
- Évasion de Hassan Terro, L' (1974)
- Enfer à dix ans, L' (1968)

== F ==
- Faham, El (1973), also known as Charcoal Maker, The (1973)
- Femmes d'Alger (1992)
- Festival panafricain d'Alger (1970)
- fil algerien complet (all the films)
- Folles années du twist, Les (1986)
- Frontières (2001)

== G ==
- Ghoula, El (1972)
- Guerre de libération (1973), also known as War of Liberation (1973)
- Guerre Sans Images (2002)
- Génération de guerre (1971)

== H ==
- Haçla (2003)
- Harem de madame Osmane, Le (1993)
- Hassan terro (1967)
- Histoire Off 1983 Hamid Benamra
- Histoire d'une rencontre (1985)
- Histoires de la révolution (1969)
- Honneur de la tribu, L' (1993)
- Hors-la-loi, Les (1968)
- hors la loi (2009)
- How Big Is Your Love (2011)
- Héritage, L' (1975), also known as Legacy, The (1975)
- HIZAM Hamid Benamra 2016 Festival du Caire

== I ==
- Il était une fois dans l'oued (2005)
- Ilo Tsy Very (1987)
- Inch'Allah dimanche (2001)
- Indigènes (2006)
- inland gabbla (2009)
- Iskanderija... lih? (1978), also known as Alexandria... Why?

== J ==
- J'ai habité l'absence deux fois, de Drifa Mezenner (2011)
- Jean Farès (2001)
- Jowjet libni (1982), also known as Wife for My Son, A

== K ==
- Kalaa, El, also known as Citadel, The (1988)
- Kyoko, la saison des vendanges des rêves 2023 festival de Moscou.
- Khamsa - The Well of Oblivion (2022)

== L ==
- La nuit a peur du soleil (1965)
- Leïla et les autres (1977)
- Little Senegal (2001)
- Louss, warda al-rimal (1988)
- Lettre à ma soeur, de Habiba Djahnine (2006)
- Le Démon au féminin
- Le Doigt dans l'engrenage (1974)

== M ==
- Machano (1996)
- Made In (1999)
- Magique, Le (1996)
- Mains libres, Les (1964)
- Manara, El (2004)
- Maquam Echahid (1984)
- Message d'Alger (1998)
- Moissons d'acier (1983)
- Montagne de Baya, La (1997)
- The Most Gentle Confessions (1971)
- Morituri (2007)
- Mughamarat batal (1979)

== N ==
- Nahla (1979), entered into the 11th Moscow International Film Festival
- Nomades, Les (1975)
- Noua (1972)
- Nouba, La (1979)

== O ==
- Omar Gatlato (1976), entered into the 10th Moscow International Film Festival
- L'Opium et le Bâton (1971), entered into the 7th Moscow International Film Festival

== P ==
- Papicha (2019)
- Patrouille à l'Est (1971)
- Peuple en marche (1963)
- Poussières de vie, also known as Dust of Life (1995)
- Premier pas (1979)
- Prends 10000 balles et casse-toi (1981)
- Pour une vie meilleure Hamid Benamra 1981
- Père (2004)

== R ==
- Rachida (2002)
- Remparts d'argile (1968)
- Rih al awras (1966), also known as Winds of the Aures, The or Le Vent Des Aurès. Entered into the 1967 Cannes Film Festival and the 5th Moscow International Film Festival
- Rome plutôt que vous (Roma wa la n'touma/Rome Rather Than You) de Tarik Teguia (2006)
- Rupture (1982)
- Rückkehr aus der Wüste, Die (1990), also known as Return from the Desert (1990)
- Rêveries de l'acteur solitaire 2016 Hamid Benamra

== S ==
- Salut cousin! (1996)
- Sanaoud (1972)
- Seekers of Oblivion (2004)
- Soleil assassiné, Le (2003), also known as Assassinated Sun, The (2003)
- Song of Umm Dalaila, the Story of the Sahrawis (1993)
- Straniero, Lo (1967), also known as Black Sweat
- Suspects, Les (2004)

== T ==
- Tahia ya didou! (1971)
- Thé d'Ania, Le (2004)
- Tomorrow, Algiers? (2011)
- Tre pistole contro Cesare (1966)
- TIMELIFE 2019 Hamid Benamra Festival de Moscou

== U ==
- Un rêve algérien (2003)
- Une femme taxi à Sidi Bel-Abbès, also known as Female Cabby in Sidi Bel-Abbes, A (2000)
- Until the End of Time (2017)

== V ==
- Vacances de l'inspecteur Tahar, Les (1972)
- Velikij turan (1995)
- Vent de sable (1982)
- Viva Laldjérie also known as Viva Algeria (2004)
- Vivre au paradis also known as Living in Paradise (1998)
- Voie, La (1967)
- Voisine, La (2002)

== W ==
- Walo Fendo (1999)
- West Indies (1979)

== Y ==
- Ya ouled (1993)
- Yelema (1993)
- Youcef (1994)

== Z ==
- Z (1969)
- Zabana! (2012)
- Zerda ou les chantes de l'oubli, La (1983)
- Zone interdite (1974)
