= Autumn: October in Algiers =

1993 film

- Directed by: Malik Lakhdar-Hamina
- Written by: Malik Lakhdar-Hamina
- Starring: Malik Lakhdar-Hamina
- Music by: Safy Boutella
- Release date: 8 December 1993
- Running time: 92 minutes
- Country: Algeria
- Language: French

Autumn: October in Algiers (Arabic: خريف: أكتوبر بالجزائر العاصمة, romanized: kharīf: ʾuktūbir bil-Jazāʾir al-ʿāṣima; French: Automne... Octobre à Alger) is a 1993 Algerian drama film directed by Malik Lakhdar-Hamina. The film was selected as the Algerian entry for the Best Foreign Language Film at the 67th Academy Awards, but was not accepted as a nominee.

== Cast ==
- Malik Lakhdar-Hamina as Djihad
- Nina Koritz
- Merwan Lakhdar-Hamina as Momo
- Sid Ahmed Agoumi as Yazid
- François Bourcier as Edouard
- Mustapha El Anka as Zombretto
- Rachid Fares as Ramses

== See also ==
- List of submissions to the 67th Academy Awards for Best Foreign Language Film
- List of Algerian submissions for the Academy Award for Best Foreign Language Film
