= How Big Is Your Love =

2011 film

- Directed by: Fatma Zohra Zamoum
- Written by: Fatma Zohra Zamoum
- Produced by: Fatma Zohra Zamoum
- Starring: Nourdine Alane
- Cinematography: Rémi Mazet
- Release date: September 2011
- Running time: 98 minutes
- Country: Algeria
- Language: Arabic

How Big Is Your Love (Arabic: Kedach ethabni) is a 2011 Algerian drama film written and directed by Fatma Zohra Zamoum. The film had its North American premiere at the Palm Springs International Film Festival.

== Cast ==
- Nourdine Alane as Rachid
- Nadjia Debahi-Laaraf as Khadidja
- Louiza Habani as Safia
- Nadjia Laaraf-Debbahi as Khadidja
- Abdelkader Tadjer as Lounes
- Racim Zennadi as Adel
