= Ali in Wonderland =

1981 film

- Directed by: Ahmed Rachedi
- Written by: Rachid Boudjedra; Ahmed Rachedi
- Starring: Djéloul Beghoura
- Release date: July 1981
- Running time: 122 minutes
- Country: Algeria
- Language: French

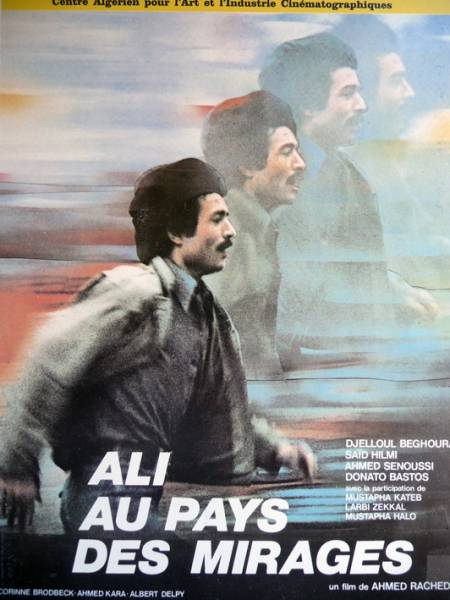
Movie poster

Ali in Wonderland (French: Ali au pays des mirages) is a 1981 Algerian drama film directed by Ahmed Rachedi. It was entered into the 12th Moscow International Film Festival where it won a Special Prize.

== Cast ==
- Donato Bastos
- Djéloul Beghoura as Ali (as Djelloul Beghoura)
- Corinne Brodbeck as Thérèse
- Albert Delpy as Jean-Christophe
- Saïd Helmi as Salah
- Henri Poirier
- Ahmed Snoussi as Ahmed
- Andrée Tainsy
- Jean Valmont
