= Sid Ali Mazif =

Algerian film director (1943–2023)

- سيدعلي مزيف
- Born: 16 October 1943; Algiers, French Algeria
- Died: 2 May 2023 (aged 79); Algiers, Algeria
- Occupation: Film director

Sid Ali Mazif (16 October 1943 – 2 May 2023) was an Algerian film director.

== Biography ==
Born in Algiers on 16 October 1943, Mazif began his career as an assistant director on the film Vingt ans à Alger. He studied at the Institut national du cinéma de Ben Aknoun. During his studies, he released his first short films from 1965 to 1966. He then began working for the Office national pour le commerce et l'industrie cinématographique, where he directed documentaries such as La Cueillette des oranges and Le Paludisme en Algérie. He also collaborated on two important films in Algerian cinematic history: L'Enfer à dix ans and Histoires de la révolution.

Mazif's first feature film, Sueur noire, touched on the struggles of miners during the colonial era. His 1975 film, Les Nomades, focused on the issue of settling Algeria's nomadic people. Since the release of Leïla et les Autres, he campaigned for women's rights in Algeria.

Sid Ali Mazif died in Algiers on 2 May 2023, at the age of 79.

== Filmography ==
- Sueur noire (1972)
- Les Nomades (1975)
- Leïla et les Autres (1977)
- J'existe (1982)
- Houria (1986)
- La Cause des femmes (2007)
- La Violence contre les femmes (2007)
- Le Patio (2016)
