= Allel El Mouhib =

- Born: March 1, 1920; Algiers, Algeria
- Died: December 4, 1995
- Citizenship: Algerian
- Occupation: Actor
- Notable work: La Voie • El Ghoula • The Man Who Looked at Windows

Allel El Mouhib born on 1 March 1920 in Algiers and died on 4 December 1995 (in Arabic : علال المحب) was an Algerian actor. He is known for his work in Algerian films from the 1960s to the 1980s.

== Biography ==
Allel El Mouhib was born in Algiers on 1 March 1920. He began his artistic career in the theatrical troupe of the Algerian Muslim Scouts before being noticed by Mahieddine Bachtarzi, a prominent figure in Algerian theatre, who gave him roles in plays such as El ‘Abd El Abied and ‘Antil. After the independence of Algeria, he reportedly joined the Algerian National Theatre.

== Career ==
=== Filmography ===
Year	Title	Role / Notes
1968	La Voie	Actor
1969	Z	Actor
1972	El Ghoula	Actor / Writer
1975	Les Enfants de novembre	Actor
1982	The Man Who Looked at Windows	Actor

== Legacy and influence ==
Allel El Mouhib is mentioned as a teacher or mentor to actor Hadj Abderrahmane.

== See also ==
- Cinema of Algeria
