= Lamine Merbah =

Algerian filmmaker (1946–2026)

- لمين مرباح
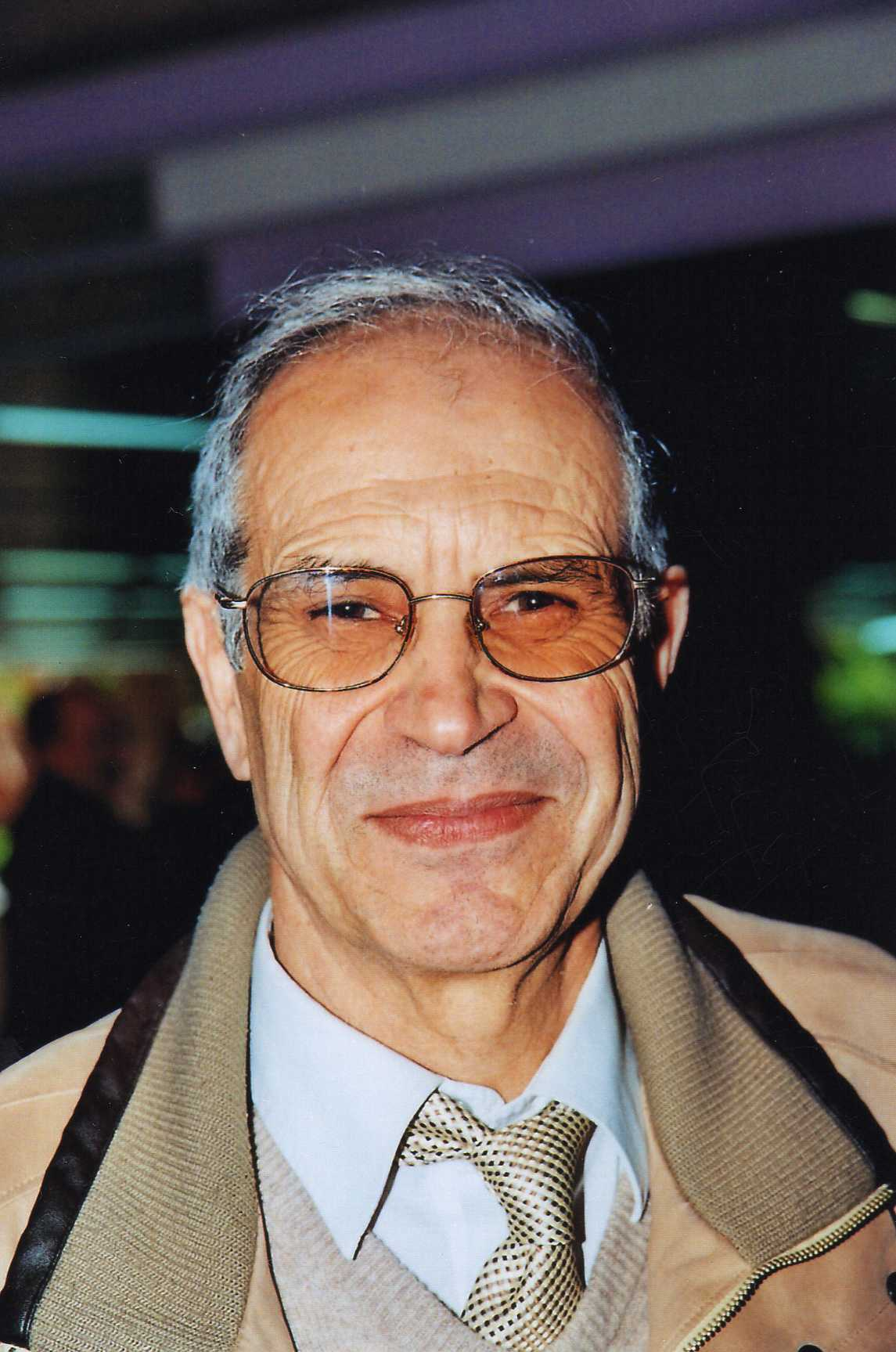
- Merbah in 2008
- Born: Mohammed Lamine Merbah; 28 July 1946; Palikao, French Algeria
- Died: 24 July 2026 (aged 79); Algiers, Algeria
- Education: University of Algiers (Lic.)
- Occupation: Filmmaker

Mohammed Lamine Merbah (Arabic: مُحمَّد الأمين مرباح; 28 July 1946 – 24 July 2026) was an Algerian filmmaker.

After he earned a licentiate in sociology from the University of Algiers, he took a hiatus from filmmaking between 1995 and 2002 due to a severe illness. After his return, he notably went on to create a soap opera titled Darna Lakdima (Notre ancienne maison) and documentaries titled L'Afrique, des ténèbres à la lumière and L'Imam Ibn Youcef Es-snoussi.

Merbah died in Algiers on 24 July 2026, four days shy of his 80th birthday.
