= Zabana! =

2012 film

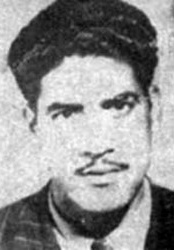
- Ahmed Zabana
- Directed by: Saïd Ould Khelifa
- Written by: Azzedine Mihoubi
- Produced by: Yacine Laloui
- Starring: Khaled Benaïssa
- Cinematography: Marc Koninckx
- Release date: 7 September 2012 (TIFF)
- Running time: 107 minutes
- Country: Algeria
- Language: Arabic

Zabana! (Arabic: زبانة) is a 2012 Algerian drama film directed by Saïd Ould Khelifa. The film was selected as the Algerian entry for the Best Foreign Language Oscar at the 85th Academy Awards, but it did not make the final shortlist.

== Cast ==
- Khaled Benaïssa
- Imad Benchenni
- Abdelkader Djeriou
- Laurent Gernigon
- Corrado Invernizzi
- Nicolas Pignon

== See also ==
- List of submissions to the 85th Academy Awards for Best Foreign Language Film
- List of Algerian submissions for the Academy Award for Best Foreign Language Film
