= Chronicle of the Years of Fire =

1975 film by Mohammed Lakhdar-Hamina

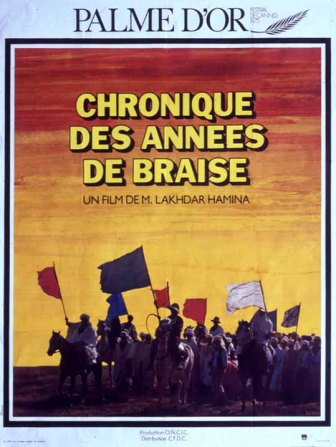
- Original French poster
- Arabic: وقائع سنين الجمر
- Literally: Chronicle of the Years of Embers
- French: Chronique des Années de Braise
- Literally: Chronicle of the Years of Embers
- Directed by: Mohammed Lakhdar-Hamina
- Written by: Rachid Boudjedra; Tewfik Fares; Mohammed Lakhdar-Hamina
- Starring: Yorgo Voyagis; Mohammed Lakhdar-Hamina; Hadj Smaine Mohamed Seghir; Leila Shenna
- Cinematography: Marcello Gatti
- Distributed by: Arab Film Distribution
- Release date: 26 November 1975
- Running time: 177 minutes
- Country: Algeria
- Languages: Algerian Arabic; French

Chronicle of the Years of Fire (Arabic: وقائع سنين الجمر, romanized: Waqāʾiʿu sinīna l-jamri; French: Chronique des Années de Braise; these names both mean "Chronicle of the Years of Embers") is a 1975 Algerian drama historical film directed by Mohammed Lakhdar-Hamina. It depicts the Algerian War of Independence as seen through the eyes of a peasant.

The film won the Palme d'Or prize at the 1975 Cannes Film Festival. It was also selected as the Algerian entry for the Best Foreign Language Film at the 48th Academy Awards, but it was not nominated.

== Plot ==
The film is composed of 6 chapters: The Years of Ash, The Years of Embers, The Years of Fire, The Year of the Cart, The Year of the Charge, and November 1, 1954.

The story of the film begins in 1939 and ends on November 11, 1954. Through historical milestones, it demonstrates that the Red All Saints' Day on November 1, 1954 (the start of the Algerian War), is not a historical accident but the culmination of a long process of suffering and struggles, initially political and later military, undertaken by the Algerian people against the fait accompli of French colonization, which began with a landing at Sidi-Ferruch on June 14, 1830.

== Cast ==
- Yorgo Voyagis as Ahmed
- Larbi Zekkal as Si Larbi Ben M’hidi
- Cheikh Nourredine as Akli, Ahmed’s blacksmith friend
- Hassan El-Hassani as El Hadj, grocer
- Leila Shenna as Ahmed's wife
- Sid Ali Kouiret as Saïd, Ahmed’s cousin
- Malik Lakhdar-Hamina as Ahmed’s children
- Tarek Lakhdar-Hamina as Ahmed’s children
- Merwan Lakhdar-Hamina as Ahmed’s children
- Mohammed Lakhdar-Hamina as Miloud
- Hadj Smaine Mohamed Seghir as Sage du village
- Cheikh Nourredine as L'ami
- François Maistre as Le contremaître de la carrière
- Taha El Amiri

== Reception ==
Mark Cousins, writing for The Guardian, named it one of the ten best African films ever made. He said that "if our movie memories weren't so Hollywood-skewed, we'd think of [it] as a classic".

== See also ==
- List of submissions to the 48th Academy Awards for Best Foreign Language Film
- List of Algerian submissions for the Academy Award for Best Foreign Language Film
- The Battle of Algiers, 1966 classic docudrama on Algerian War
- Lost Command, a commercial film on the Algerian War of Independence and Indochine War
- Lion of the Desert, a similar movie about Omar Mukhtar's Libyan resistance against Italian occupation
