= The Winds of the Aures =

1966 film

- Directed by: Mohammed Lakhdar-Hamina
- Written by: Tewfik Fares; Mohammed Lakhdar-Hamina
- Starring: Keltoum
- Edited by: Hamid Djellouli; Liazid Khodja
- Release date: 1967
- Running time: 95 minutes
- Country: Algeria
- Languages: Arabic; French

The Winds of the Aures (Arabic: ريح الاوراس, translit. Rih al awras, French: Le Vent des Aurès) is a 1967 Algerian war film directed by Mohammed Lakhdar-Hamina. It was entered into the 1967 Cannes Film Festival where it won the award for Best First Work. It was also entered into the 5th Moscow International Film Festival.

== Technical details ==
- Original title: Le Vent des Aurès
- Native title (Arabic): ريح الأوراس
- Directed by: Mohammed Lakhdar-Hamina
- Country of origin: Algeria
- Year of release: 1966
- Runtime: 95 minutes
- Language: Arabic
- Production company: ONCIC (Office national pour le commerce et l’industrie cinématographique)
- Format / Color: Color – 35 mm
- Genre: Drama / Fiction

== Cast ==
- Keltoum as Mother
- Mohamed Chouikh as Lakhdar
- Hassan Hassani (as Hassan El-Hassani)
- Thania Timgad
- Mustapha Kateb
- Omar Tayare

== Restoration ==
The Winds of the Aures will be restored by the World Cinema Project through the African Film Heritage Project initiative.
