= Amar Laskri =

- Born: 22 January 1942; Aïn Berda, Algeria
- Died: 1 May 2015 (aged 73)
- Occupation: film director
- Notable work: Le Communiqué

Amar Laskri (22 January 1942 – 1 May 2015) was an Algerian film director. He studied theater, radio, television and film in Belgrade.

Born in Aïn Berda, Algeria, he directed several feature films and short films and one episode of television.

== Filmography ==
Feature films

- 1969 : Le Communiqué
- 1971 : Patrouille à l'est
- 1989 : Les Portes du silence
- 1999 : Fleur du Lotus
