= Rouiched =

Algerian comedy actor and singer

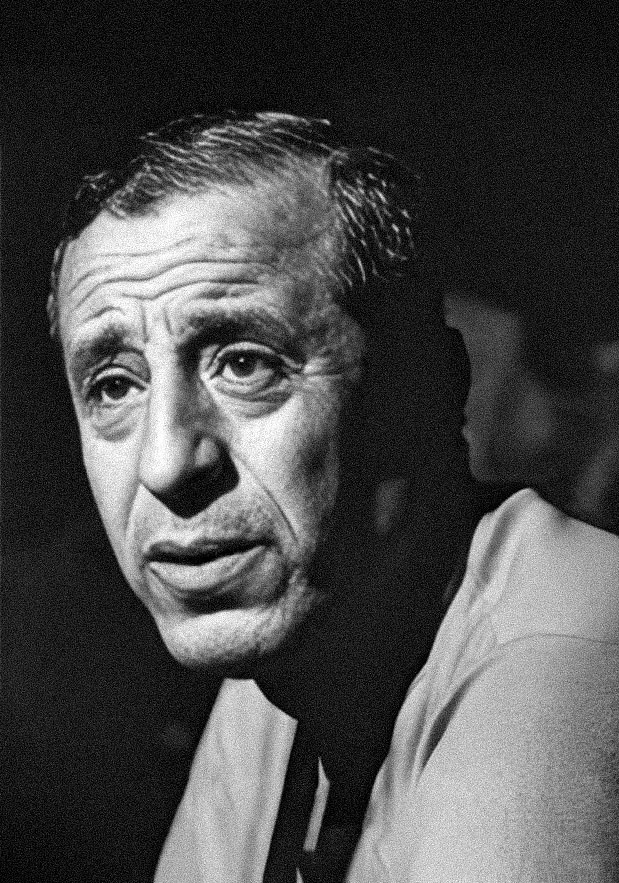
- Ayad in 1982
- Born: Ahmed Ayad; April 28, 1921; Casbah of Algiers, Algeria
- Died: January 28, 1999 (aged 77); El Biar, Algiers, Algeria
- Citizenship: Algerian
- Occupations: Actor; Comedian; Singer; Author
- Notable work: L'Opium et le Bâton
- Children: Mustapha Ayad

Ahmed Ayad (Arabic: أحمد عياد), better known by his stage name as Rouiched, was an Algerian comedy actor and singer, born on April 28, 1921, in Casbah of Algiers and died on January 28, 1999, in El Biar (Algiers).

== Biography ==
Rouiched was born to a father from Ait Djenad in Tizi Ouzou and a mother from Blida. He was the half-brother of the renowned Chaâbi singer Hadj M'rizek. During his childhood, he had many occupations to survive. Self-educated, he took the stage for the first time in a theater piece by Abdelhamid Ababsa called "Estardjâ Ya Assi". His performance was remarkable, after which he devoted himself and his time to the art, and became the leader of an artistic troupe. During the 1930s, 1940s, and 1950s, Rouiched was influenced by the artistic scene of the Casbah and performed under the direction of Mahieddine Bachtarzi, collaborating with prominent actors of the era such as Rachid Ksentini, Mustapha Badie, Nadjat Tounsi, Sid-Ali Fernandel, Mohamed Touri and Mustapha Kateb.

Following the independence of Algeria in 1962, he became a member of the Algerian National Theater. His greatest success came with the film "Hassen Terro" directed by Mohamed Lakhdar-Hamina. He continued his career on the Algerian Television, acting in many comedies and television films until his death.

== Filmography ==
- 1966 : The Battle of Algiers
- 1967 : Hassan Terro
- 1971 : L'Opium et le Bâton
- 1974 : L'évasion de Hassan Terro
- 1982 : Hassan Taxi
- 1983 : L'Affiche
- 1986 : Médaille à Hassan
- 1989 : Hassan Niya
- 1991 : Ombres blanches

== Plays ==
- El Ghoula (1966)
- Les Concierges (El Bouaboune)
- Ah Ya Hassan

== Honors ==
- Posthumously awarded the National Order of Merit by the President of Algeria.

== Bibliography ==
- Cheurfi, Achour (1997). Dictionnaire des musiciens et interprètes algériens. Algiers: ANEP. ISBN 978-9961903070.
