= Ahmed Rachedi (film director) =

Algerian film director

- Born: 1938 (age 87–88); Tebessa, French Algeria
- Occupations: Film director, screenwriter
- Years active: 1963–2004
- Notable work: L'Opium et le Bâton

Ahmed Rachedi (born 1938), is an Algerian Academy-Award Winning filmmaker. He co-produced the acclaimed 1969 political drama, Z, and directed L'Opium et le Bâton (1971) and Ali in Wonderland (1981).

== Early life ==
Ahmed Rachedi was born in Tebessa, French Algeria.

== Career and accolades ==
Rachedi was nominated for the Academy Award for Best Picture for the film Z (1969), which he co-produced. The film Z (1969) won an Academy Award on 7 April 1970.

His 1971 film L'Opium et le Bâton was entered into the 7th Moscow International Film Festival.

His 1981 film Ali in Wonderland won a Special Prize at the 12th Moscow International Film Festival.

== Other activities ==
Rachedi was a co-founder of the Pan African Federation of Filmmakers in 1969/70.

== Selected filmography ==
- L'Opium et le Bâton (1971)
- The Most Gentle Confessions (1971)
- Le Doigt dans l'engrenage (1974)
- Ali in Wonderland (1981)
- C'était la guerre (1993, co-directed with Maurice Failevic)
