= Cinema of Algeria =

- No. of screens: 19 (2009)
  - Per capita: 0.1 per 100,000 (2009)

Number of admissions (2006)
- Total: 700,000

Gross box office (2007)
- Total: $100,000

Cinema of Algeria refers to the film industry based in the north African country of Algeria.

== History ==
=== The colonial era ===
During the era of French colonization, movies were predominantly a propaganda tool for the French colonial state. Although filmed in Algeria and viewed by the local population, the vast majority of "Algerian" cinema in this era was created by Europeans.

Films such as The Funny Muslim (1897) by the Lumière brothers and Ali Barbouyou et Ali Bouf à l'huile (1907) by Georges Méliès reinforced stereotypes and served as colonial propaganda, portraying Algerians in caricatural ways. The colonial propaganda films themselves generally depicted a stereotypically image of pastoral life in the colony, often focusing on an aspect of local culture that the administration sought to change, such as polygamy. One example of such a film is Albert Durec's 1928 Le Désir.

Popular French cinema filmed or set in Algeria often echoed many of the tropes common in administration-funded films. For example, L'Atlantide was a wildly popular 1921 French-Belgian silent movie filmed in the Aurès Mountains, Djidjelli, and Algiers in what was then French Algeria. Although not explicitly about Algeria, the movie (itself based on a popular book) depicts two French Foreign Legion officers and their love affair with the lascivious queen of a fictional Saharan kingdom. One of the earliest films to engage with the French presence in North Africa, the film emphasizes not only the romance and exoticism of the venture, but also European anxieties over their role in Africa and the possibly dangerous effects of inter-racial contact. Other films with similar themes followed, including Le Bled (1929), Le Grand Jeu (1934), and La Bandera (1935).

European domination of the means of cinematic production ended in the early days of the Algerian War, when several Algerian nationalists from the National Liberation Army (ALN) obtained basic film-making equipment which they used to create four short programs. These films were screened via a relay system to viewers in a variety of sympathetic socialist nations. Their content supported the growing nationalist rebellion, including the place of ALN hospitals and a Mujahideen attack on the French mines of the Société de l'Ouenza.

=== The emergence of Algerian cinema in the 1960s and 1970s ===
Algeria became an independent nation in 1962, a topic which garnered heavy attention amongst Algerian movie productions of the 1960s and 1970s.

Mohammed Lakhdar-Hamina's canonical 1967 film The Winds of the Aures depicts a rural farming family whose lives are destroyed by colonialism and war. The plot depicts the tragic plight of a mother who leaves her home in the Aurès mountains of eastern Algeria to search desperately for her son, a nationalist who has followed in his father's footsteps but been captured by the French army. Symbolically, the film uses the family to represent the fate of the nation: impoverished, exploited, but struggling to be free. The film won an award at the 1967 Cannes Film Festival for Best First Work.

Outside of Algeria, one of the most famous films of this era is The Battle of Algiers (1966), an Algerian-Italian co-production that obtained three Oscar nominations.

Other examples of Algerian cinema from this era include Patrol in the East (1972) by Amar Laskri, Prohibited Area (1972) by Ahmed Lallem, The Opium and the Stick (1970) by Ahmed Rachedi, Palme d'Or-winner Chronicle of the Years of Fire (1975) by Mohammed Lakhdar-Hamina, and Costa Gavras' Oscar-winning Z. A notable French-Algerian documentary about the aftermath of the war is the 1963 Peuple en marche.

Along with decolonization and the Algerian War, the plight of urban youth is another common theme. One example of this theme is Merzak Allouache's Omar Gatlato.

Several comedy stars also emerged, including the very popular Rouiched, star of Hassan Terro or Hassan Taxi. In addition, Hadj Abderrahmane - better known under the pseudonym of the "Inspector Tahar" - starred in the 1973 comedy The Holiday of The Inspector Tahar directed by Musa Haddad. The most famous comedy of this period is Carnaval fi dechra directed by Mohamed Oukassi, and starting Athmane Ariouet.

=== Contemporary cinema, 1980 to the present ===
Algerian cinema slumped in the mid-1980s, and major productions became rare. Some attribute this fact to the state's unwillingness to subsidize Algerian film. There were a few success, including Mohamed Oukassi's 1994 comedy Carnival fi Dachra, filmed in Maghrebi Arabic and following the story of a man who runs for mayor of his village (or "dachra") only to be seduced by power and seek to become the president of Algeria. Director Merzak Allouache's Athmane Aliouet and Salut Cousin! (1996) are two other examples of Algerian comedies produced in this era.

Some characterize contemporary Algerian cinema to be in a rebuilding phase. The recent trend has been an increase of Francophone cinema, as opposed to films in Algerian Arabic. Some attribute this to the Francophone market encouraged by increased immigration to France in the 1990s. For example, Franco-Algerian productions such as Rachid Bouchareb's Outside the Law have met with great success (and controversy).

A full statistical report on the cinema industry in Algeria, edited by Euromed Audiovisual and the European Audiovisual Observatory can be found on the Observatory's website here.

== See also ==
- French cinema
- Arab cinema
- Cinema of the world
- Culture of Algeria
- List of Algerian films
- Centre Algerien de la Cinematographie
