= Nadia Kaci =

Algerian actress (born 1970)

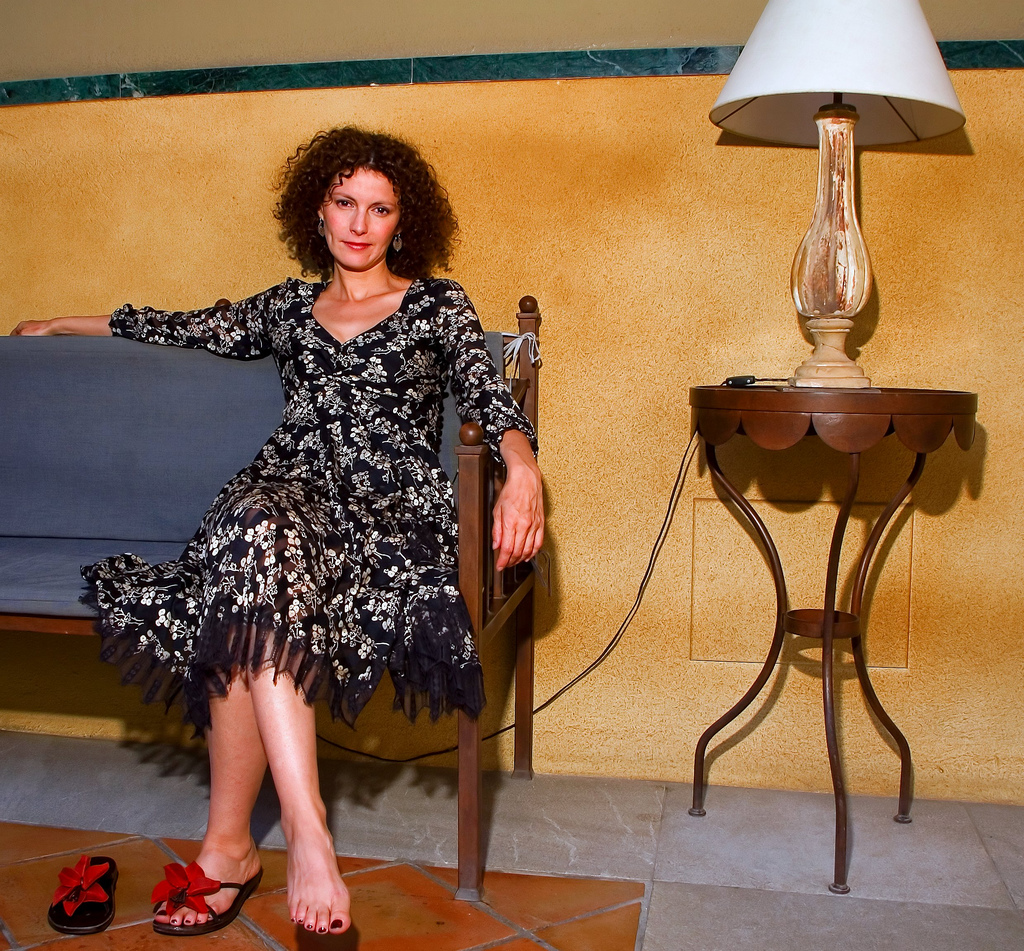
- Born: 1970 (age 55–56); Algiers, Algeria
- Occupation: Actress
- Years active: 1990-present

Nadia Kaci (Arabic: نادية قاسي; born 1970) is an Algerian actress.

== Biography ==
Kaci was raised in Algiers by a mother who was "colorful, illiterate, and cultured". She taught her daughter feminism from a young age and played darbouka for the seven children. At age 18, Kaci became worried about the direction of Algeria and the freedoms due to the 1988 October Riots and the rise of Islamic nationalism. When she decided to become an actress, her father refused to speak to her for twenty years. Kaci was encouraged to move to France, but initially refused since she thought it was traitorous. She eventually left for France in 1993, after the bigotry became unbearable for her.

In 1994, Kaci played Yamina, the liberal sister of Said who is forced to wear a veil, in Bab El-Oued City. The film was directed by Merzak Allouache and condemns the violence of Islamic fundamentalists, and received the International Federation of Film Critics award at the 1994 Cannes Film Festival. She portrayed the intellectual Fatiha in Bent Familia, released in 1997. In 1999, Kaci starred as pediatric nurse Samia Damouni in It All Starts Today.

Kaci played Julie, a worker at a local-authority home caring for René, in Nationale 7 in 2000. Malcolm Lewis of New Internationalist praised her performance as having "lightness but real mettle." She starred in Les Suspects in 2004, an adaptation of the novel Les Vigiles by Tahar Djaout. In 2007, Kaci starred in Délice Paloma, directed by Nadir Moknèche.

In 2015, Kaci played Freyha in Lotfi Bouchouchi's The Well. Kaci starred in I Still Hide to Smoke, directed by Rayhana Obermeyer in 2016. She starred in Until the Birds Return and The Blessed in 2017, both of which examine life in Algiers in the post-civil war era. In 2019, Kaci played Madame Kamissi in Papicha, directed by Mounia Meddour. The film premiered at the 2019 Cannes Film Festival and focuses on the daily life of a student obsessed with fashion in the early 1990s.

Kaci obtained French citizenship in 2015. She has a son and said she cannot imagine living anywhere else. She considers the Algerian War and the slums of Nanterre some of her favorite subjects to act in.

== Filmography ==
Films

- 1990 : La Fin des Djinns (short film)
- 1994 : Bab El-Oued City : Yamina
- 1995 : Douce France : Myssad
- 1997 : Bent Familia : Fatiha
- 1999 : It All Starts Today : Samia Damouni
- 2000 : Le Harem de Madame Osmane : La Rouquine
- 2000 : Nationale 7 : Julie
- 2002 : Vivre me tue
- 2003 : Tiresia
- 2004 : Viva Laldjérie : Fifi
- 2004 : Les Suspects
- 2006 : 7 Years : Djamila
- 2007 : Délice Paloma : Sheherazade / Zouina
- 2015 : The Well : Freyha
- 2016 : I Still Hide to Smoke : Keltoum
- 2017 : Lola Pater : Rachida
- 2017 : Until the Birds Return
- 2017 : The Blessed : Amal
- 2019 : Papicha : Madame Kamissi

TV series

- 2000 : Contre la montre : Nicole Maluzier
- 2003 : Carnets d'ados : La Vie quand même : social worker
- 2007 : L'Affaire Ben Barka : Ghita
- 2009 : Le Commissaire Llob
- 2011 : Le Chant des sirènes : Theatre professor
- 2022: The Crimson Rivers:Yamina Sauvaire
- 2023 : Miskina, Poor Thing : Najet
