= Bouazizi =

Bouazizi is an Arabic surname. Notable people with the surname include:

- Mohamed Bouazizi (1984–2011), Tunisian activist
  - Mohamed-Bouazizi Square
- Riadh Bouazizi (born 1973), Tunisian footballer
