= Crayons of Askalan =

- Film poster
- Arabic: أقلام من عسقلان
- Directed by: Laila Hotait Salas
- Written by: Laila Hotait Salas & Tetra Balestri
- Produced by: Federika Odriozola, Nadia Hotait
- Starring: Mohammed Masri, Zuhdi Al Adawi
- Cinematography: Diego Lopez Calvin
- Edited by: Miguel Burgos
- Music by: Scrambled Eggs
- Release date: October 26, 2011 (Doha)
- Running time: 52 minutes
- Countries: Lebanon; Spain; Qatar
- Language: Arabic

Crayons of Askalan (Arabic: أقلام من عسقلان) is a 2011 documentary film based on the story of Palestinian artist Zuhdi Al Adawi. In 1975, at the age of fifteen Zuhdi is imprisoned in the high security Israeli jail, Askalan. With the help of his fellow prisoners and their families, he keeps his spirit alive through artistic expression, smuggling in color crayons and smuggling out his artwork, with a pillowcase as his canvas. It was selected to compete at the 2012 HOT DOCS International Documentary Festival, the 2012 CPH:Dox Festival and 2011 Doha Tribeca Film Festival, among many others.
