= The Repentant =

The Repentant may refer to:

- The Repentant (2002 film), French film
- The Repentant (2012 film), Algerian film

== See also ==
- At-Tawbah (The Repentance), ninth chapter of the Quran
