= 2011 Algerian self-immolations =

Protest events in Algeria

Starting in January 2011, over 20 people attempted self-immolation in Algeria. The incidents followed Mohamed Bouazizi's self-immolation in Tunisia and the subsequent anti-government protests it set off. Many of the immolations took place in front of government buildings following unsuccessful attempts to lodge complaints with Algerian authorities. Four self-immolators died from their injuries. These events were part of the larger Arab Spring.

== Initial incidents and first victims ==
On 12 January, 26-year-old Mohamed Aouichia set himself on fire in Bordj Menaiel. He had been sharing a room with seven other people since 2003 and had repeatedly approached local authorities to get on the social housing list, but was rebuffed. He has so far survived.

On 13 January, Mohsen Bouterfif, a 37-year-old father of two, set himself on fire in front of the town hall in Boukhadra, Tébessa. He and around 20 others were protesting a lack of jobs and housing after the mayor refused to receive them. According to one testimony, the mayor shouted to them: "If you have courage, do like Bouazizi did, set yourself on fire!" Bouterfif's death was reported on 16 January, causing about 100 young men to protest. The provincial governor then removed the mayor from his duties. The following day, however, hospital staff claimed he was still alive, though in critical condition. Al Jazeera described the suicide as "echoing the self-immolation that triggered the protests that toppled the leader of neighboring Tunisia." Bouterfif finally died on 24 January at a hospital in Annaba.

== Following immolations ==
These suicides were followed by dozens more attempted or successful self-immolations across the country, most of them after Tunisian president Zine El Abidine Ben Ali fled his country on 14 January. Protests following these incidents lasted into 2012. Cases included:

=== January ===
- 14 January: Said H., a 26-year-old unemployed bachelor, set himself on fire in front of the Urban Security offices in Jijel. He was taken to the hospital with no visits allowed.
- 15 January: Senouci Touati, an unemployed 34-year-old, immolated himself in Mostaganem. He had not heard of the previous Algerian cases, but was frustrated by what he considered an unjustified discharge from the army without a pension.
- 16 January: About 20 harraga (would-be illegal emigrants) from Annaba attempted to set their boat on fire when approached by the coast guard; the fire was extinguished, but the fate of two of the people on the boat is unknown.
- 17 January: Maamir Lotfi, a 36-year-old unemployed father of four, immolated himself in front of the El Oued town hall after he unsuccessfully asked to meet the governor. He was taken to the hospital with second-degree burns and later died on 12 February.
- 18 January:
  - Karim Benidine, a 35-year-old bachelor said to have mental health issues, immolated himself in front of the town hall in Dellys. He was critically burned and transferred to a hospital. He died on 22 January at Douera Hospital in Algiers.
  - A 23-year-old man immolated himself at Berriane in the Sahara in front of the daira office. He was saved with only light burns on his right foot.
- 19 January:
  - Afif Hadri, a 37-year-old father of six, immolated himself in El Oued. He was saved in time by onlookers.
  - G. Seguir, a 54-year-old disabled man in M'Sila, covered himself with an Algerian flag and sprinkled himself, his 11-year-old son, and his 8-year-old daughter with petrol while standing in front of the wilayah seat, threatening to set himself and them on fire. After an hour of tense negotiations with an official, he let the children go and tried to set himself on fire; onlookers extinguished the fire and took him to a hospital. Reportedly, the immediate provocation was that his family's electricity was left cut off by Sonelgaz even after he gathered enough money to pay the bill.
  - K. L., a 26-year-old, immolated himself inside the tribunal of Ras El Oued, Bordj Bou Arréridj after authorities refused to return his confiscated motorcycle. He was quickly stopped and survived with only minor burns.

The Ministry of Religious Affairs responded to this wave of self-immolations by devoting the Friday sermons of 21 January to admonitions of patience and reminders that suicide is forbidden in Islam. However, some cases continued to be reported over coming days:

- 23 January: A teenager in Oued Taourira, Sidi Bel Abbes set himself on fire, apparently following a family altercation.
- 25 January: Kamel Bouria, a 38-year-old fireman and father in Oum El Bouaghi, set himself on fire following workplace difficulties. Another fireman at the same station, Karim Mehanaine, had threatened to do the same days earlier but was dissuaded.
- 26 January: A young unemployed man immolated himself in front of the wilayah seat at Djelfa and shouted "Hagrouni" (meaning, "they have wronged me") as he burned. He was said to have been protesting exclusion from the housing list.
- 28 January: Abdelhafid Boudechicha, a destitute 29-year-old day labourer living with his parents and five siblings, immolated himself at Medjana. He repeatedly shouted, "I'm fed up!" He died the next day. His friends said he struggled to find a job or housing.
- 29 January: B. S., a 29-year-old, son of an entrepreneur, immolated himself in front of Mohamed Khemisti High School next to the wilayah seat at Mostaganem. He suffered third-degree burns. According to security forces, the incident was related to disappointment in love.
- 30 January:
  - A bank security guard in Staoueli, Algiers attempted to burn himself during a protest by bank workers against the bank's director.
  - S. Hakimi, an employee of Algerian water company ADE, sprinkled himself with petrol at ADE's director office in Tizi Ouzou, but was stopped from setting himself alight. He was apparently protesting an arbitrary transfer.

=== February ===
- 6 February: At a protest called for by the National Committee for the Rights of the Unemployed, a young man working as a security guard for a very low wage drenched himself in petrol, but was stopped before lighting a match.
- 9 February: A 25-year-old man from Chréa, Blida set himself on fire in protest of the police's failure to respond to his complaint of having been beaten up. He was taken to the hospital badly injured.
- 18 February: A married man threatened to set himself on fire at the daira office of Sidi M'hamed, Algiers but was dissuaded, and instead saw Governor Rabah Mokdad about his housing problems.
- 21 February: Three fathers formerly working at a cotton factory attempted to set themselves on fire in Issers, Boumerdes after their requests to return to the jobs they were fired from were rejected. They were fired in the wake of a strike campaign against the privatisation of the factory. The men were stopped and taken to hospital with some injuries.

=== October ===
- 4 October: A 19-year-old immolated himself after he was refused permission to resit the Baccalaureate exam at his former secondary school in Oran
- 8 October: An Algerian woman in Oran died after setting herself and her three-year-old son on fire. She had been evicted from her flat, for which she had recently paid her life savings amounting to 28,000 dollars.

== See also ==
- Self-immolations in Tunisia
- 2013 Bulgarian self-immolations
