= The Rooftops (film) =

- Film poster
- Arabic: لسطوح
- Directed by: Merzak Allouache
- Music by: Abdelaziz El Ksouri; Mohammed Ghouli; Djamil Ghouli; Fathi Nadjem
- Release date: October 20, 2013 (London Film Festival)
- Running time: 94 minutes
- Countries: France; Algeria
- Language: Varieties of Arabic

The Rooftops (Arabic: السطوح, transliteration: Es-stouh) is a 2013 Algerian film directed by Merzak Allouache. The film premiered at the 2013 London Film Festival.

== Cast ==
- Adila Bendimerad as Assia
- Nassima Belmihoub as Selouma
- Ahcène Benzerari as Cheikh Lamine
- Aïssa Chouhat as Halim
- Mourad Khen as Hamoud
- Myriam Ait el Hadj as Layla
- Akhram Djeghim as Hakim
- Adlane Djemil as karimo
- Amal Kateb as Aïcha
