= I Still Hide to Smoke =

2016 film directed by Rayhana

- À mon âge je me cache encore pour fumer
- Directed by: Rayhana Obermeyer
- Produced by: Michèle Ray-Gavras; Fenia Cossovitsa; Salem Brahimi
- Starring: Hiam Abbass, Fadila Belkebla, Nadia Kaci
- Cinematography: Olympia Mytilinaiou; Mohamed Tayeb Laggoune
- Music by: Anne-Sophie Versnaeyen
- Distributed by: Les Films du Losange
- Release dates: 18 November 2016 (Tallinn Black Nights); 26 April 2017 (France)
- Running time: 90 minutes
- Countries: France; Greece; Algeria
- Language: Arabic

I Still Hide to Smoke (French: À mon âge je me cache encore pour fumer; lit. 'At my age I still hide to smoke') is a 2016 French-Greek-Algerian drama film directed by Rayhana Obermeyer. The film premiered at the 2016 Tallinn Black Nights Film Festival.

== Plot ==
Fatima is a strong-willed woman who works as a masseuse in a hamam in Algiers. The year is 1995, and the situation in the capital is tense, as laws are being passed limiting women's freedoms. But the hammam is a safe place to roll a cigarette or talk, away from the eyes of men. Women from different backgrounds gather there, and talk about their lives.

On her way to work one day, Fatima witnesses a terror attack. In the hamam, rather than feeling safe, the atmosphere is electric and she finds it difficult to maintain order. The situation deteriorates when Meriem arrives at the hamam. Meriem is 16 years old and pregnant, and seeking refuge. Shortly thereafter, her brother Muhammad arrives, to "cleanse" his honor with blood.

== Cast ==
- Hiam Abbass as Fatima
- Biyouna as Aïcha
- Fadila Belkebla as Samia
- Nassima Benchicou as Zahia
- Nadia Kaci as Keltoum
- Sarah Layssac as Nadia
- Lina Soualem as Meriem
- Maymouna as Louisa
- Faroudja Amazit as Madame Mouni
- Fethi Galleze as Mohamed

== Production ==
The film is an adaptation from Obermeyer's play of the same name, from 2009. Obermeyer first came up with the idea for the play and film in the early 1990s, following the Islamic Salvation Front (FIS) massive win in Algeria's first-ever "free and democratic" elections. As soon as the FIS took power, the party established Islamist rules against women, including dress codes, and segregation between men and women in public places (schools, hospitals, store lines, and bus stops).

According to Rayhana, as the film's director is widely known, the film is about a woman's desires in a man's world. Rayhana, who is also an actress, playwright and screenwriter, is a feminist who uses her art to protest injustice. Because of her outspokenness, her film is banned from showing in her home country of Algeria. "My movie is forbidden in my country, because I speak about women who express freely... Anyone who wears pants or shirts with half sleeves is considered a prostitute." She said that a woman who smokes is considered to have bad morals. “But smoking is for everyone, man or woman.” Rayhana herself fled Algeria in 2000, following terrorist attacks in which many of her friends were killed.

=== Filming ===
Due to the nude scenes in the film, the production could not use a hamam in Algeria or Turkey. Instead, they chose to film in a hamam in Thessaloniki, Greece.

== Reception ==
The film received universal accolades, and has been screened at international film festivals around the world. According to the Hollywood Reporter's Jordan Mintzer, Smoke is a "fairly gripping account of women finding respite in each other’s company at a time, and in a place, where they have few possibilities to express themselves freely." Amal Awad, reviewing the film for Australia's SBS, called it a "thrilling tale" and "It’s a reminder of why we watch stories".

=== Accolades ===
Year	Award	Category	Nominee(s)	Result	Ref.
2016	Thessaloniki Film Festival	Golden Alexander	Rayhana Obermeyer	Nominated	
2016	Thessaloniki Film Festival	Audience Award	I Still Hide to Smoke	Won	
2017	Brussels Mediterranean Film Festival	Critic's Award	I Still Hide to Smoke	Won	
2017	Brussels Mediterranean Film Festival	Grand Prix	I Still Hide to Smoke	Won	
2017	Raindance Film Festival	Discovery Award for Best Debut Feature	Rayhana Obermeyer	Won	
