= Miskina, Poor Thing =

French comedy television series

- French Amazon Prime Video poster
- French: Miskina, la pauvre
- Genre: Comedy
- Created by: Melha Bedia; Xavier Lacaille; Yoann Gromb
- Directed by: Melha Bedia; Anthony Marciano
- Starring: Melha Bedia; Shirine Boutella; Hakim Jemili; Victor Belmondo; Xavier Lacaille; Alka Balbir; Nadia Kaci; Zorah Benali; Sarah Layssac; Romain Delbart; Oussama Kheddam
- Composer: Phazz
- Country of origin: France
- Original language: French
- No. of seasons: 2
- No. of episodes: 14

Production
- Executive producer: Hervé Ruet
- Producers: Nicolas Duval Adassovsky; Margaux Marciano; Foucauld Barre
- Cinematography: Emmanuel Soyer
- Running time: 24–34 minutes
- Production company: Quad

Original release
- Network: Amazon Prime Video
- Release: 30 September 2022 – present

Miskina, Poor Thing (French: Miskina, la pauvre) is a French comedy television series created by Melha Bedia, Xavier Lacaille, and Yoann Gromb. The first season was released on Amazon Prime Video on 30 September 2022.

== Premise ==
Fara, a French-Algerian Muslim, is 30 years old with no apartment, no job, and no boyfriend. The series follows her misadventures as she navigates family, business, love, and finally growing up.

== Cast ==
- Melha Bedia as Fara
- Shirine Boutella as Safia
- Hakim Jemili as Nassim
- Victor Belmondo as Maxime
- Xavier Lacaille as Damien
- Alka Balbir as Cherifa
- Nadia Kaci as Najet
- Zorah Benali as Rania
- Sarah Layssac as Nadia
- Romain Delbart as Rudy
- Oussama Kheddam as Bilal

== Episodes ==
=== Series overview ===
Series	Episodes	Originally released
1	8	30 September 2022
2	6	27 September 2024

=== Season 1 ===
No. overall	No. in season	Title	Duration	Original release date
1	1	"Mabrouk"	33 min	30 September 2022
Fara is the maid of honor at her sister's wedding. She is Algerian and Muslim, living in France. Her sister's new husband is not Muslim and their grandmother refuses to attend the wedding. Fara endures a lot of criticism from her family.
2	2	"Hunger Management" (Le Début de la faim)	24 min	30 September 2022
Because of her fight with her mom and grandmother, Fara moves out of their home and into her friends house. She feels guilty about having lied to her grandmother for years about going to the mosque regularly, so she decides to start attending classes at the mosque and she fasts for Ramadan. She also admits to herself that she's hoping for something more in her relationship with the man who's been her lifelong platonic best friend.
3	3	"The Kiwi Syndrome" (Le Syndrome du Kiwi)	24 min	30 September 2022
Fara has a falling out with the friends she's been staying with and they send her packing, so she moves back in with her mom and grandmother. Damien had been renting her room, and the family really likes him, so they offer to him that he can keep living there and stay on the couch. He's developed a loving bond with Fara's grandmother as they watch her soap operas together every day and discuss. Ramadan ends. Fara asks Damien to drive her to the junkyard to try to buy her dad's old food truck back, and he agrees. They both grow closer to each other as they open up more to each other on the trip, and Fara shares how her dad's abandonment really messed her up.
4	4	"One Two Three"	28 min	30 September 2022
Fara's friends Rudy and Nadia throw a party to watch the France vs Algeria soccer match. Fara attend the party, as does her best male friend Nassim who she is secretly in love with. Fara's cousin shows up and Fara watches her flirt with Nassim, she gets jealous. Also, Fara's grandmother is unhappy with the tangine that Damien bought her to replace the one he'd accidentally broken. The grandmother says the bread that's baked on the new tangine doesn't taste right.
5	5	"The Chicken or the Egg" (L'oeuf ou la poule)	27 min	30 September 2022
This episode is mostly flashbacks of how Fara's parents met and started dating in the 1970s.
6	6	"Oran the Radiant" (Oran la radieuse)	28 min	30 September 2022
Fara's grandmother is in the hospital after collapsing at home. She's feisty and wants to go home but the doctor urges her to stay the night for observation. She mentions again how much she misses her old tangine, and tells the family that she wishes she could have an exact replacement by the same maker, who has a store in the market in Oran, Algeria. Fara and her sister Safia travel together to Algeria to see if they can find this store and buy their grandmother the tangine she wants since it is important to her. They stay overnight with their cousins and extended family. Later they hire a sketchy but attractive taxi cab driver to take them around. The cab driver and Safia flirt.
7	7	"Amazigh People"	34 min	30 September 2022
Fara and Safia continue their adventures in Algeria with the sketchy cab driver taking them to a remote area to buy the special tangine for their grandmother. They have a bunch of misadventures and conflict and reconciliation. In Algeria, they learn more about their father and what he's done since abandoning them 20 years before. They don't have a cell phone signal for a couple days because they're in such a rural area, and when they finally make it back to the airport and receive their texts and voicemails, they learn of devastating developments back home that happened while they were traveling.
8	8	"Idir le chat" (Idir the Cat)	34 min	30 September 2022

=== Season 2 ===
No. overall	No. in season	Title	Duration	Original release date
9	1	"Inheritance"	29 min	27 September 2024
10	2	"Gender Reveal Party"	30 min	27 September 2024
11	3	"Prayers and Consultations"	28 min	27 September 2024
12	4	"The Last Dance"	33 min	27 September 2024
13	5	"The Age of Television"	26 min	27 September 2024
14	6	"Historia Familiar"	26 min	27 September 2024

== Production ==
The events of Miskina, Poor Thing are partially inspired by Bedia's life.

== Release ==
The series was renewed for a second season in June 2023. The second second was released on 27 September 2024.
