= Harragas =

- Directed by: Merzak Allouache
- Written by: Merzak Allouache
- Screenplay by: Merzak Allouache
- Produced by: Librisfilms Baya Films France 2 Cinéma
- Starring: Nabil Asli, Lamia Boussekine, Seddik Benyagoub, Mohamed Takerrat, Samir El Hakim
- Cinematography: Philippe Guilbert
- Edited by: Sylvie Gadmer
- Music by: David Hadjadj
- Release date: 2009
- Running time: 95 minutes
- Countries: Algeria; France

Harragas is a 2009 film.

== Synopsis ==
Harragas are clandestine immigrants that flee their country to escape from poverty. The story takes place in Mostaganem, on the Algerian coast. The boatman, Hassan, prepares the secret crossing to Spain of a group of ten illegal immigrants that barely take anything with them: a change of clothes, a cell phone, and a bit of money. Harragas tells the odyssey of this group of people who dream of Spain, barely 125 miles from the Algerian coast and the door that opens onto the European "El Dorado".

== Awards ==
- Festival de Cine Mediterráneo de Valencia 2009
- Festival Internacional de Cine de Dubái 2009
