= Melha Bedia =

French actress and comedian (born 1990)

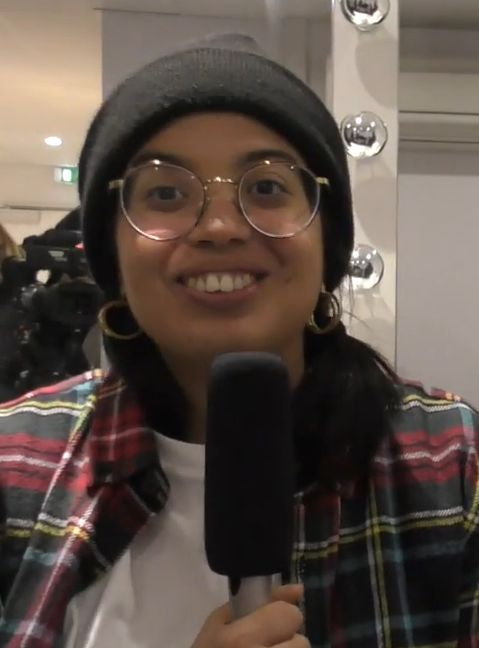
- Bedha in 2020
- Born: 22 December 1990 (age 35); Paris, France
- Occupations: Actress; comedian; director; screenwriter
- Relatives: Ramzy Bedia (brother)

Melha Bedia (born 22 December 1990) is a French actress, comedian, director, and screenwriter. She created and starred in the Amazon Prime Video comedy series Miskina, Poor Thing (2022–2024).

== Early life ==
Bedia was born in Paris, the daughter of Algerian parents; her father is from Kabylia and her mother is from Oran. She is the younger sister of actor Ramzy Bedia; initially, her brother did not support her comedy and acting career, citing an obligation to protect her. She also has a sister named Rania.

Bedia played for the Paris Saint-Germain girls' academy team in her youth. She was educated at a private Catholic school, skipping second grade and obtaining her baccalauréat at the age of 16. She later enrolled at the Sorbonne, but dropped out before graduating.

== Career ==
Bedia began her comedy career opening for French rapper Diam's while working as her stylist on tour. In 2018, after taking on smaller acting roles, she co-wrote and starred in Ballsy Girl, a film about a woman who takes up pole dancing to embrace her femininity. At the 45th César Awards in 2020, Bedia co-presented the César Award for Best Cinematography with Arnaud Valois.

In 2022, she co-created, co-wrote, and co-directed the Amazon Prime Video comedy series Miskina, Poor Thing. After a 2025 appearance on the show Liars Club on Amazon Prime Video, Bedia was criticized for using the term "bande de gwers", an offensive term toward white, Christian, non-Muslim people.

== Filmography ==
=== Film ===
Year	Title	Role	Notes	Ref.
2014	The Grad Job	Fati		
2016	Tout schuss	Brenda		
2016	Pattaya	Boulette		
2016	Hibou	Enquêtrice WWF		
2017	Bad Buzz	La vendeuse migrante		
2020	Ballsy Girl	Nour	Also co-writer	
2020	Simply Black	Herself		
2022	Two Much for the Job	Sofia		
2022	The (in)famous Youssef Salem	Bouchra Salem		
2025	Le Mélange des genres	Sofia		

=== Television ===
Year	Title	Role	Notes	Ref.
2012–2014	Lascars	Nora	2 episodes	
2015	Les Kassos	Sharon	1 episode	
2019	Mike	Lacrima	1 episode	
2022–2024	Miskina, Poor Thing	Fara	Main role; also creator, writer, and director	
2025	Liars Club	Herself		
