= Bab El-Oued City =

1994 film

- Film poster
- Directed by: Merzak Allouache
- Written by: Merzak Allouache
- Produced by: Merzak Allouache; Jacques Bidou; Jean-Pierre Gallepe
- Starring: Nadia Kaci
- Cinematography: Jean-Jacques Mréjen
- Edited by: Marie-Blanche Colonna
- Release date: 10 November 1994
- Running time: 93 minutes
- Country: Algeria
- Language: Arabic

Bab El-Oued City is a 1994 Algerian drama film directed by Merzak Allouache. It was screened in the Un Certain Regard section at the 1994 Cannes Film Festival, where it won the FIPRESCI Award.

== Plot ==
Boualem is a baker's boy who works early mornings and sleeps during the day. One day, the imam's prayer is boosted to full volume through Bab El-Oued's loud speakers, leading Boualem to tear out one of those speakers and throw it in the sea. The Islamic authorities of the city launch a manhunt for the perpetrator.

== Cast ==
- Nadia Kaci - Yamina
- Mohamed Ourdache - Said
- Hassan Abidou - Boualem
- Mabrouk Ait Amara - Mabrouk
- Messaoud Hattau - Mess
- Mourad Khen - Rachid
- Djamila Bachène - Lalla Djamila
- Simone Vignote - The aunt
- Michel Such - Paulo Gosen
- Nadia Samir - Ouardya
- Areski Nebti - Hassan the baker
- Osmane Bechikh - The postman
- Fawzi B. Saichi - The shoemender
- Fatma Zohra Bouseboua - Hanifa
- Ahmed Benaissa - The Imam
