= Hi Cousin! =

1996 film

- Directed by: Merzak Allouache
- Written by: Merzak Allouache
- Starring: Gad Elmaleh
- Release date: 17 May 1996 (Cannes)
- Running time: 97 minutes
- Country: Algeria
- Languages: French; Arabic

Hi Cousin! (French: Salut cousin!) is a 1996 Algerian comedy film directed by Merzak Allouache. The film was selected as the Algerian entry for the Best Foreign Language Film at the 69th Academy Awards, but was not accepted as a nominee.

== Cast ==
- Gad Elmaleh as Alilo
- Messaoud Hattau as Mok (as Mess Hattou)
- Magaly Berdy as Fatoumata
- Ann-Gisel Glass as Laurence
- Jean Benguigui as Maurice
- Xavier Maly as Claude

== See also ==
- List of submissions to the 69th Academy Awards for Best Foreign Language Film
- List of Algerian submissions for the Academy Award for Best Foreign Language Film
