= Adila Bendimerad =

Algerian actress and filmmaker

- Born: 1988 (age 37–38)
- Citizenship: Algeria
- Occupations: Actress; Producer screenwriter
- Awards: Red Sea International Film Festival; Venice International Film Festival

Adila Bendimerad (born 1988) is an Algerian actress, screenwriter, director and producer. She won the Best Scriptwriter award at the 2023 Amman International Film Festival.

== Career ==
Bendimerad has collaborated with several directors from the MENA region such as Malik Chibane, Taj Intaj, Merzak Allouache, Karim Moussaoui.

== Filmography ==
- One Thousand and One Nights
- The Rooftops
- Normal!
- The Repentant
- Ma part de Gaulois
- The Days Before
- Kindil el Bahr
- The Last Queen

== Awards and nominations ==
Year	Award	Category	Film	Result	Ref
2022	Red Sea International Film Festival	Best Actress	The Last Queen	Won	
2022	Red Sea International Film Festival	Best Feature Film (Best Movie)	The Last Queen	Nominated	
2022	Venice International Film Festival	Best Film	The Last Queen	Nominated	
2023	Amman International Film Festival	Best Scriptwriter	The Last Queen	Won	
