= Lotfi Bouchouchi =

Algerian film director

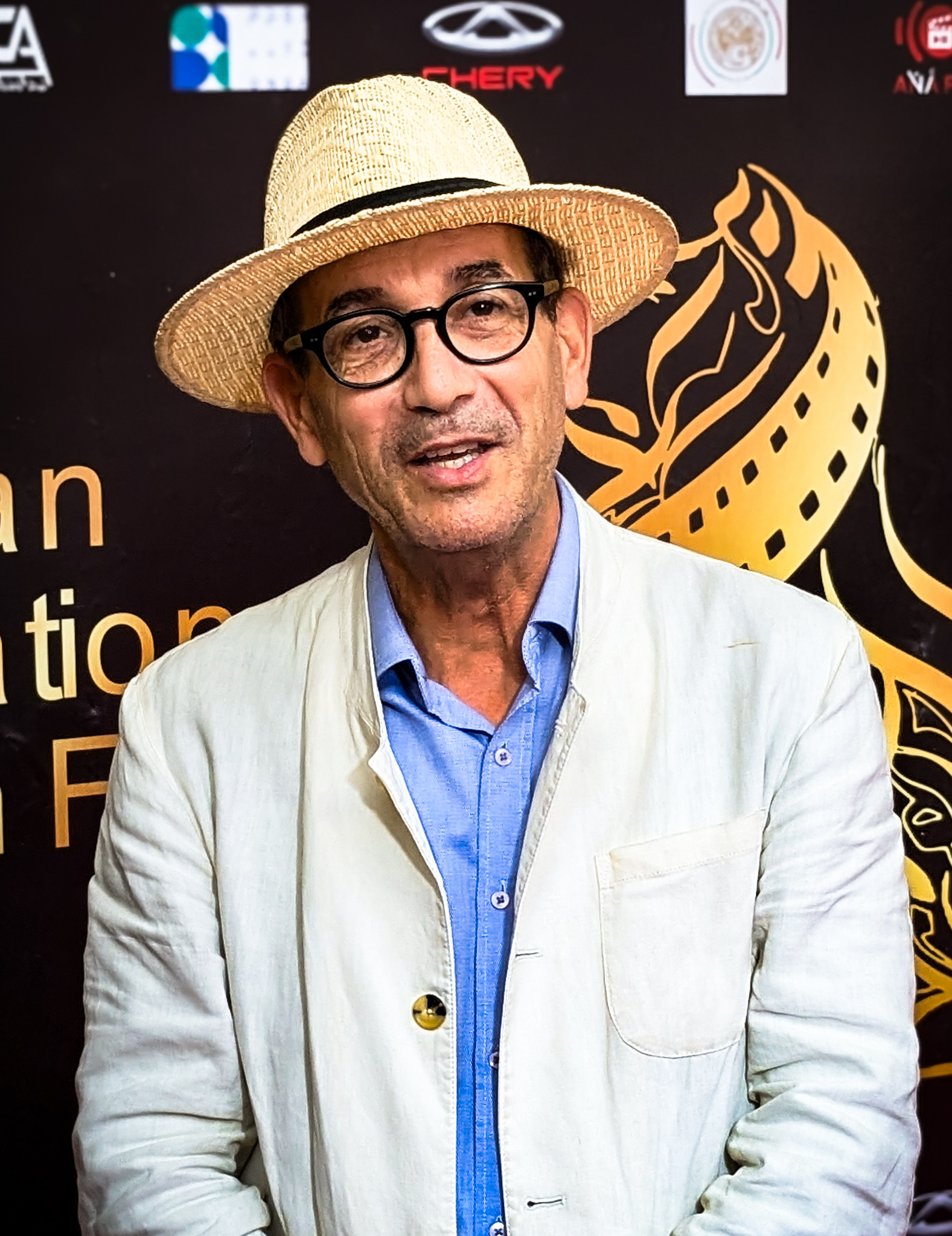
- Born: 1964 (age 61–62); Algeria
- Education: École supérieure de cinéma
- Known for: Algerian filmmaker and producer
- Notable work: The Well

Lotfi Bouchouchi (Arabic: لطفي بوشوشي, born 1964 in Algiers) is an Algerian filmmaker and producer.

== Biography ==
Bouchouchi graduated from the École supérieure de cinéma de Paris. He made his debut in the audiovisual field as first assistant to directors Merzak Allouache and Mohamed Chouikh. He has worked for the French media group TF1, French television channel France 24 and Canadian television network APTN1.

His 2015 directorial feature debut The Well was selected as the Algerian entry for the Best Foreign Language Film at the 89th Academy Awards but did not make the nomination. Nevertheless, the film participated in multiple international film festivals and won numerous awards.

In 2021, Bouchouchi received funding from the Doha Film Institute for the production of a television series, Dar El Malika. The same year, he began shooting his new feature film The Station.

== Partial filmography ==
=== Feature films (as director) ===
- 2015: The Well (Le puits)
