= Normal! =

2011 film

- Film poster
- Directed by: Merzak Allouache
- Written by: Merzak Allouache
- Starring: Nabil Asli
- Cinematography: Hocine Hadjali
- Release date: 28 October 2011 (DTFF)
- Running time: 111 minutes
- Country: Algeria
- Language: Arabic

Normal! is a 2011 Algerian drama film written and directed by Merzak Allouache. It won the Best Film Award at the Doha Tribeca Film Festival, in 2011.

== Cast ==
- Nabil Asli as Nabil
- Adila Bendimerad as Amina
- Mina Lachter as Mina
- Nouah Matlouti as Lamia
- Nadjib Oulebsir as Fouzi
