= La Très Très Grande Classe =

- Directed by: Frédéric Quiring
- Written by: Frédéric Quiring
- Produced by: Les Films du 24; Groupe TF1
- Starring: Melha Bedia; Audrey Fleurot; François Berléand
- Distributed by: Apollo Films
- Release date: 10 August 2022
- Running time: 100 minutes
- Country: France
- Language: French

La Très Très Grande Classe is a 2022 French comedy film directed by Frédéric Quiring.

== Plot ==
Sofia is a French teacher in a difficult high school. Mistreated by her students, it is full of joy that she announces to her class her following mutation by telling her students the piece of her mind. But shortly after, her mutation is suspended by her high school because of another teacher with whom she finds herself in competition. The problem is that this one is a perfect teacher, with a perfect class and a perfect resume. With such a competent and students full of revenge, Sofia is forced to all the subterfuges, including the low blows to obtain the mutation of her dreams.

== Cast ==
- Melha Bedia as Sofia
- Audrey Fleurot as Mrs. Delahaye
- François Berléand as Mr. Picard
- Vincent Lecuyer as the head of the high school
- Arié Elmaleh as Benoît Hunault
- Nissim Renard as Sam
- Nathalie Besançon as Miss Lannoy
- Élie Semoun as Raf
- Vinciane Millereau as the jury
- Tiguidanke Diallo as Elykia
- Matteo Salamone as Enguerrand

== Reception ==
The film was not well received by critics. In addition, only a few of them gave it a review. For La Voix du Nord, the film was described as "too lazy". Le Journal du Dimanche stated that "Melha Bedia confirms her comic talent in that social fable who, by performing expressions that are too cartoonish, wants to remind the mission of the school. We are less convinced by the gesticulations of Audrey Fleurot, as annoying as absurd in the role of a horrible clone of Cruella".

For Télérama, the performance of Melha Bedia is "fair", but that is not enough to compensate a "generalized caricature, rancid jokes and good feelings in spades, a film that rather gives the envy to skip the classes". Le Parisien sumps up its review in only a few words as "a comedy as unlikely as annoying".

== Box-office ==
For its first day of broadcast in France, the film made 36,440 entries (including 10,269 in preview) for 477 copies. The film is overtaken in the ranking of other new films by One Piece Film: Red (267,631 entries) and followed by Nope (36,205 entries).

After one week of broadcast, the film reached 168,103 viewers and is ranked 8th at the box-office of the week, behind Top Gun: Maverick (180,658 viewers) and before Ducobu président ! (97,550 viewers). For its second week of broadcast, the film is ranked last at the box-office with a total of 123,282 additional entries, behind Thor: Love and Thunder (136,930 entries).
