= Let Them Come =

2015 film

- Film poster
- Directed by: Salem Brahimi
- Written by: Salem Brahimi
- Starring: Rachida Brakni
- Release date: 10 September 2015 (TIFF)
- Running time: 95 minutes
- Countries: Algeria; France
- Languages: French; Arabic

Let Them Come (French: Maintenant ils peuvent venir) is a 2015 French-Algerian drama film directed by Salem Brahimi. It was screened in the Contemporary World Cinema section of the 2015 Toronto International Film Festival.

== Cast ==
- Rachida Brakni as Yasmina
- Amazigh Kateb as Nouredine
- Farida Saboundji as The Mother
- Rayhana Obermeyer
