= Bent Familia =

1997 film

- Directed by: Nouri Bouzid
- Produced by: Ahmed Bahaeddine Attia
- Starring: Nadia Kaci
- Distributed by: Africa Film Library
- Release date: 1997
- Running time: 108 minutes
- Country: Tunisia
- Language: Arabic

Bent Familia is a 1997 drama set in Tunisia about Amina (Leila Nassim) a married Muslim woman living in Tunis with her two daughters. Even though she is allowed certain freedoms as a Muslim woman this is curtailed when she meets her old friend from school called Aida acted by (Amel Hédhili).

A mother of two, Aida has divorced her husband following his infidelities to live independently. Together with their mutual friend Fatiha (Nadia Kaci), an intellectual determined to move to the West, the three women form a supportive bond. This close friendship draws opposition from Amina's husband, Majid (Raouf Ben Amor). Directed by Nouri Bouzid, the film explores the social pressures and personal conflicts experienced by women in contemporary North Africa

== Cast ==
- Raouf Ben Amor
- Kawther El Bardi
- Abderazek
- Nadia Kaci
- Kamel Touati

== Awards ==
- 1997: Montpellier Mediterranean Film Festival: Audience Award: Golden Antigone
- 1997: Namur International Festival of French-speaking Film: Best Actress
- 1997: Venice Film Festival: OCIC Award Honourable Mention

== Movie Trailer ==
- Bent-Familia sourced from the Africa Film Library
