= Madame Courage =

- Directed by: Merzak Allouache
- Written by: Merzak Allouache
- Produced by: Antonin Dedet; Merzak Allouache
- Starring: Adlane Djemil
- Cinematography: Olivier Guerbois
- Edited by: Tuong Vi Nguyen-Long
- Release date: May 20, 2015
- Countries: Algeria; France
- Language: Arabic

Madame Courage is a 2015 Algerian-French drama film produced, written and directed by Merzak Allouache. It was screened out of competition at the 72nd edition of the Venice Film Festival.

== Cast ==
- Adlane Djemil as Omar
- Lamia Bezoiui as Selma
- Leila Tilmatine as Sabrina
- Faidhi Zohra as Zhoubida
