= Hamid Sadr =

Iranian writer

Hamid Sadr (Persian حميد صدر; born 12 December 1946 in Tehran) is an Iranian author based in Austria.

== Biography ==
Sadr published his first two-story collections, Stories of the Alley (1966) and Stories of Weary Pigeons (1967), in his early 20s. The latter won Iran's Book of the Year Award and prompted an invitation to join the Writers’ Association of Iran, which Sadr accepted, making him its youngest member. He wrote his first novel, Strike of the Moths (1969), while serving in the military in southeastern Iran. By the time of its publication, he had finished his service and moved to Austria to study chemistry. When the Writers’ Association was officially banned, he began to work as its foreign correspondent, campaigning for its legalization from Europe.

The publication of Sadr's subsequent work was hindered by his affiliation with the resistance movement and the tightening of censorship under Mohammad Reza Pahlavi. In addition to his work for the Writers’ Association, he participated in the occupation of the Iranian consulate in Geneva in 1976. During the occupation, he helped smuggle out a trove of classified documents that revealed the illegal surveillance of regime critics by the Iranian secret police (or SAVAK) in Europe.

In 1979, at the time of the Iranian Revolution, Sadr decided to remain in Europe and moved from Vienna to Paris, where he worked together with the film director Jacques Bral on his films Extérieur Nuit, Polar, and Mauvais Garcon as well as with director Samuel Fuller on Street of No Return.

After returning to Vienna in 1991, Sadr started to write in German. His first German-language novel, Gesprächszettel an Dora (1994), is a reconstruction of the last months of Franz Kafka’s life. His second novel in German, Der Gedächtnissekretär (“The Memory Secretary,” 2005), engages with the legacy of the bombing of Vienna in World War II. Der Gedächtnissekretär won the Anerkennungspreis of the Bruno-Kreisky-Preis für das politische Buch and has received scholarly attention for Sadr's handling of the Austrian Culture of Remembrance as well as its connection to contemporary issues of migration. His third novel in German, Der Vogelsammler von Auschwitz (“The Bird Collector of Auschwitz,” 2009), is the final instalment of Sadr's Wahlheimat (“adopted homeland”) cycle.

== Bibliography ==
=== Persian ===
- Stories of the Alley (1966; in German translation as Die Geschichte der Gasse, 1975)
- Stories of Weary Pigeons (1967; in German translation as Die Geschichte der müden Taube, 1990)
- Strike of the Moths, Part 1 (1969)
- Cork on the Water (1975)
- Strike of the Moths, Part 2 (1975-1979)
- As Reflected in 37 Days (1983)
- Easy, Dog! Easy! (1984)
- The Letter (1996; in German translation as Der Brief, 2007)
- Zabān-i dilʹafsurdagān (2007)

=== German ===
- Gesprächszettel an Dora (Deuticke Verlag, 1994; in Czech translation as Lístky Doře, 2000; in Persian translation as Yaddashthaii baraye Dora, 2003)
- Der Gedächtnissekretär (Deuticke Verlag, 2005)
- Der Vogelsammler von Auschwitz (Shaker Media, 2009)
- Der Fluch des Gemüsehändlers Mohamed Bouazizi (Picus Verlag, 2011)
