= The Last Queen (film) =

2022 film

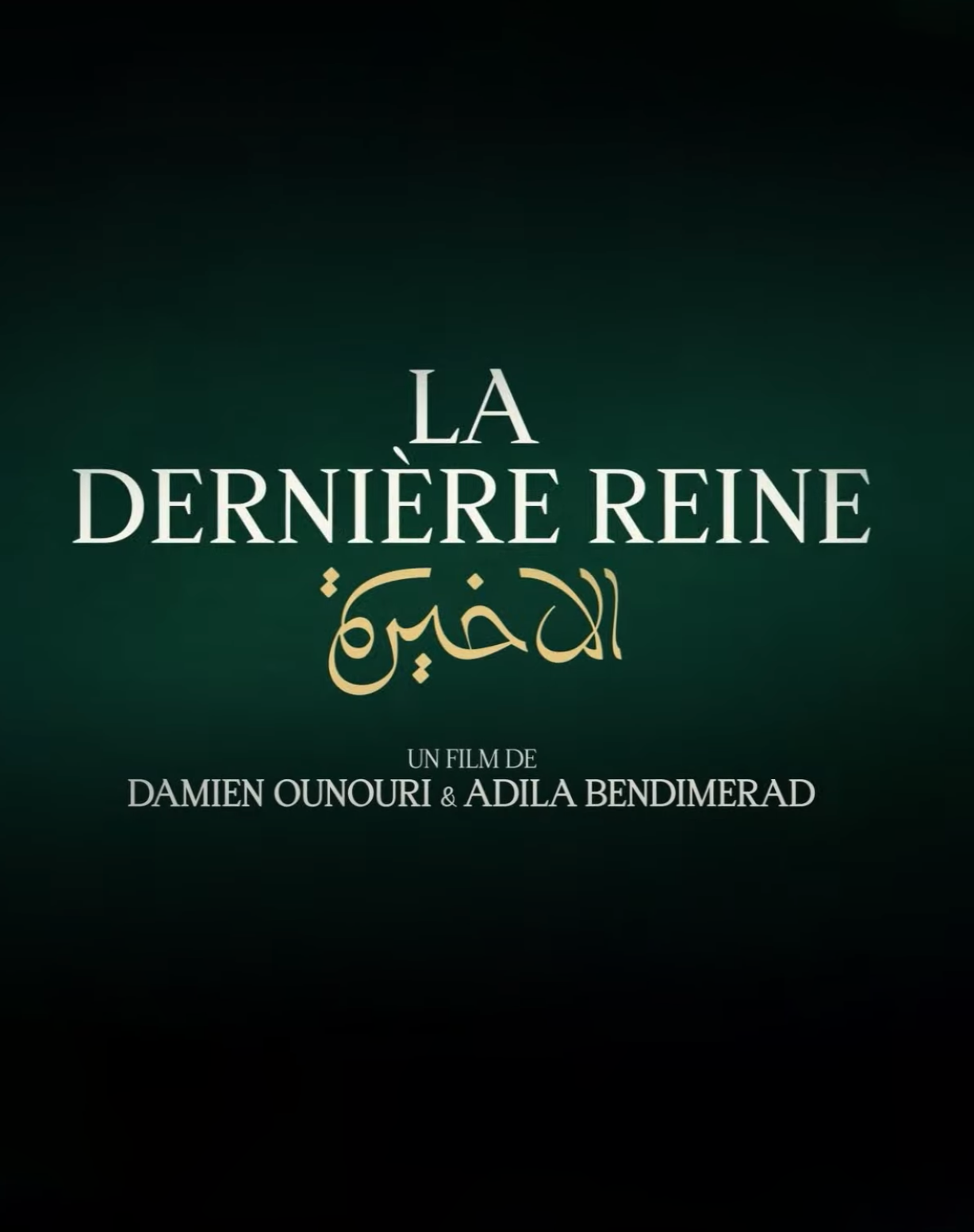
- Directed by: Adila Bendimerad, Damien Ounouri
- Music by: Evgueni Galperine, Sacha Galperine
- Release date: 2022
- Country: Algeria

The Last Queen (Arabic: الملكة الأخيرة) is a 2022 historical drama film co-directed by Adila Bendimerad and Damien Ounouri. It was primarily funded by Algeria, but also received support from France and Taiwan.

== Plot ==
In 1516, the corsair Aroudj Barbarossa freed the city of Algiers from Spanish rule, thereby taking control of the kingdom. However, he had allied himself with another ruler, King Salim Toumi, who died in mysterious circumstances. Rumours gradually spread that Barbarossa himself may have assassinated the king. The late king's wife, Queen Zaphira, decided to confront Barbarossa and stand up to him.

== Cast ==
- Adila Bendimerad: Zaphira, the Last Queen
- Dali Benssalah: Aroudj Barberousse
- Mohamed Tahar Zaoui: King Salim Toumi
- Imen Noel: Queen Chegga
- Nadia Tereszkiewicz: Astrid, the Scandinavian
- Yanis Aouine: Prince Yahia, son of Queen Zaphira and King Salim Toumi
- Leila Touchi: Yakout, the lady-in-waiting
- Ahmed Zitouni: Bosnian Corsair, right-hand man of Aroudj
- Dimitri Boetto: Ishak Barberousse
- Tarik Bouarrara: Younès, chief of Zaphira's royal guard.

== Production ==
=== Genesis ===
Damien Ounouri came up with the idea for the film after reading a book about the history of Algeria, which mentioned Queen Zaphira. Adila Bendimerad mentioned the book to him in 2014. Upon discovering that her story, her legend and even her existence had been both challenged and supported throughout the centuries, the director wanted to explore this 'knot' as a means of raising the issue of women's erasure from history. For Adila Bendimerad, the subject was even more significant, as Zaphira is not a universally popular figure. She is sometimes questioned, but that is what makes her more human.

=== Filming ===
The film was entirely shot in Algeria, in Algiers and Tlemcen at the El Mechouar Palace, as well as in other locations. Director Damien Ounouri explains the difficulty of shooting in natural settings and contemporary places related to the film's subject. Therefore, together with the director, they chose not to shoot the feature film "in a studio but to salvage bits and pieces of what we have and create a puzzle of sets"
