= The Well (2015 film) =

2015 film

- Film poster
- Directed by: Lotfi Bouchouchi
- Written by: Yacine Benelhadj
- Starring: Nadia Kaci
- Release date: 9 September 2015
- Country: Algeria
- Language: French

The Well (French: Le puits) is a 2015 Algerian drama film directed by Lotfi Bouchouchi. It was selected as the Algerian entry for the Best Foreign Language Film at the 89th Academy Awards but it was not nominated.

== Production details ==
- Title: The Well (French: Le Puits)
- Director: Lotfi Bouchouchi
- Screenwriter: Yacine Benelhadj
- Director of Photography: Hazem Berrabah
- Editor: Noura Nefzi
- Music: Cédric Perras
- Production Company: BL Films [DZ] (and co-production with AARC – Agence Algérienne pour le Rayonnement Culturel)
- Country of production: Algeria
- Original languages: Arabic & French
- Release year: 2015
- Runtime: approx. 90 minutes
- Format: Colour

== Cast ==
- Nadia Kaci as Freyha
- Laurent Maurel as Lieutenant Encinas
- Layla Metssitane as Khadidja
- Ourais Achour as Cheikh Benaouda

== See also ==
- List of submissions to the 89th Academy Awards for Best Foreign Language Film
- List of Algerian submissions for the Academy Award for Best Foreign Language Film
