= Mohamed Bouazizi =

Tunisian who self-immolated (1984–2011)

- محمد البوعزيزي
- Born: Tarek El-Tayeb Mohamed Bouazizi; 29 March 1984; Sidi Bouzid, Tunisia
- Died: 4 January 2011 (aged 26); Ben Arous, Tunisia
- Cause of death: Suicide by self-immolation
- Resting place: Garaat Bennour cemetery
- Occupation: Street vendor
- Known for: Inciting the Arab Spring through self-immolation

Tarek El-Tayeb Mohamed Bouazizi (Arabic: طارق الطيب محمد البوعزيزي, romanized: Ṭāriq aṭ-Ṭayib Muḥammad al-Būʿazīzī; 29 March 1984 – 4 January 2011) was a Tunisian street vendor who, in response to the confiscation of his wares as well as the harassment and humiliation inflicted by municipal officials and their aides, set himself on fire on 17 December 2010 in Sidi Bouzid, Tunisia. His act of self-immolation was the most immediate cause of the Tunisian Revolution, which was the first revolution in the wider Arab Spring against autocratic regimes.

Simmering public anger and sporadic violence intensified following Bouazizi's death, leading the then-president of Tunisia Zine El Abidine Ben Ali to step down on 14 January 2011, after 23 years in power. The success of the Tunisian protests inspired protests in several other Arab countries, plus several non-Arab countries, such as in China. The protests included several men who emulated Bouazizi's act of self-immolation, in an attempt to bring an end to their own autocratic governments. Those men and Bouazizi were hailed by New York Times commentators as "heroic martyrs of a new North African and Middle Eastern revolution".

In 2011, Bouazizi was posthumously awarded the Sakharov Prize jointly along with four others for his and their contributions to "historic changes in the Arab world". The Tunisian government honored him with a postage stamp. The Times of the United Kingdom named Bouazizi as "Person of 2011", The Jerusalem Post's Amotz Asa-El named him "Person of the Jewish Year 5771" and "The Protester" was named Time 2011 Person of the Year.

== Early life ==
Mohamed Bouazizi, who was known locally as "Babousa", was born in Sidi Bouzid, Tunisia, on 29 March 1984. His father, Tayeb, a construction worker in Libya, died of a heart attack when Bouazizi was three, and his mother, Manoubia, married Bouazizi's uncle some time later.

Along with his six siblings, Bouazizi was educated in a one-room country school in Sidi Salah, a small village 19 kilometres (12 mi) from Sidi Bouzid. Although several media outlets reported that Bouazizi had a university degree, his sister, Samia Bouazizi, stated that he had never graduated from high school, but that it was something he had wanted for both himself and his sisters. With his uncle in poor health and unable to work regularly, Bouazizi had worked various jobs since he was ten, and in his late teens he quit school in order to work full-time.

His father left a three-hectare plot of land whose produce hardly provided for the family. His uncle tried to build a farm that used irrigation water by taking a loan from a bank to finance the project. Though Bouazizi worked on the farm, his uncle fell in debt, and subsequently, the bank took hold of the land. It was during that time that Bouazizi became a street vendor.

Bouazizi lived in a modest stucco home, a 20-minute walk from the centre of Sidi Bouzid, a rural town in Tunisia that was estimated to have an unemployment rate of 30%. According to his mother, he applied to join the army, but was refused, and several subsequent job applications also resulted in rejection. He supported his mother, uncle, and younger siblings, including paying for one of his sisters to attend university, by earning approximately US$140 per month selling produce on the street in Sidi Bouzid. He was also working toward the goal of buying or renting a pickup truck for his work. A close friend of Bouazizi said he "was a very well-known and popular man who would give free fruit and vegetables to very poor families".

== Self-immolation and aftermath ==
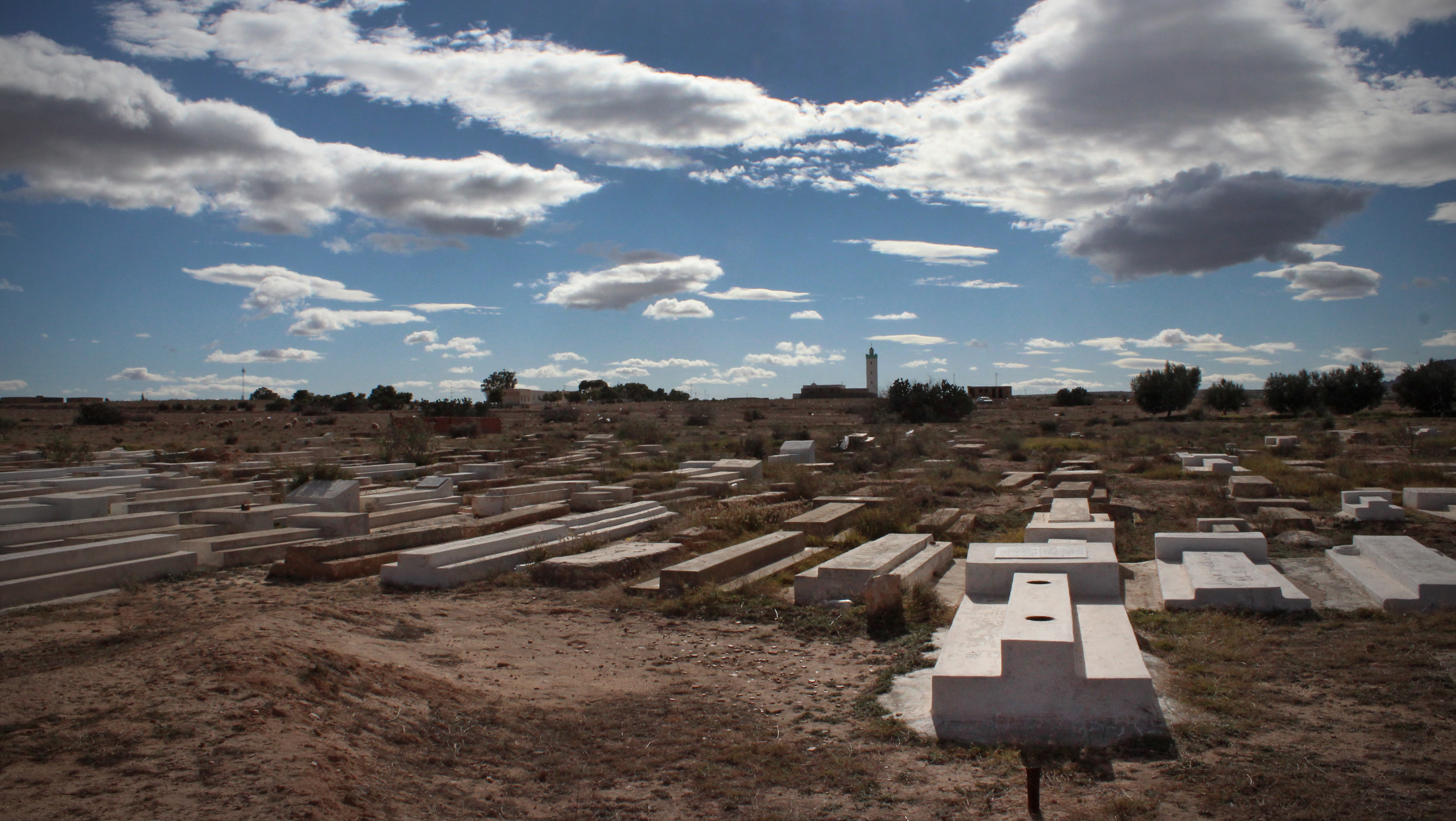
Mohamed Bouazizi's grave (front right)

According to friends and family, local police officers had been targeting and mistreating Bouazizi since his childhood, regularly confiscating his produce cart; Bouazizi, having no other way to make a living, continued working as a street vendor. Ostensibly, he was targeted because he lacked a vendor's permit, but whether he even required one was initially unclear: Rania Abouzeid of Time claimed that street vending was outright illegal in Tunisia, while The Guardian reporter Peter Beaumont claimed that Bouazizi had attempted to secure a permit but was refused. Following his death, it was confirmed by then-head of the Sidi Bouzid State Office for Employment and Independent Work Hamdi Lazhar that no permit is required to sell from a cart. As a result, police were accused by two of Bouazizi's sisters of attempting to extort him, leaving him ultimately unable to pay the bribes necessary to allow his street vending to continue. In an interview with Reuters, one of the sisters stated: "What kind of repression do you imagine it takes for a young man to do this? A man who has to feed his family by buying goods on credit when they fine him ... and take his goods. In Sidi Bouzid, those with no connections and no money for bribes are humiliated and insulted and not allowed to live."

On the evening of 16 December 2010, he took on approximately US$200 in debt in order to acquire the produce he was to sell the following day. The following morning on 17 December 2010, he started his workday at 8 a.m. Just after 10:30 a.m., the police began to harass him. The details of the events were disputed: Bouazizi's family alleged that he was publicly humiliated and slapped in the face by police officer Faida Hamdi, who allegedly spat at him before toppling his cart and confiscating his electronic scales. It was also claimed that she made a slur against his deceased father; her gender, according to his family, made his humiliation worse. Hamdi and her brother disputed this, maintaining that she did not slap Bouazizi or otherwise mistreat him, and an unnamed eyewitness likewise said to Asharq Al-Awsat that they did not see her slap Bouazizi. Hamdi did admit, however, that her colleagues may have kicked and beaten him after confiscating his fruit cart.

Following the confrontation, Bouazizi went to the governor's office to complain and demand the return of his scales. The governor refused to see or listen to him, even after Bouazizi was quoted as saying, "If you don't see me, I'll burn myself." Bouazizi then acquired a can of gasoline from a nearby gas station and returned to the governor's office. At 11:30 a.m., less than an hour after the altercation, Bouazizi stood outside the office in the middle of traffic and shouted, "How do you expect me to make a living?" before dousing himself and igniting himself with a match.

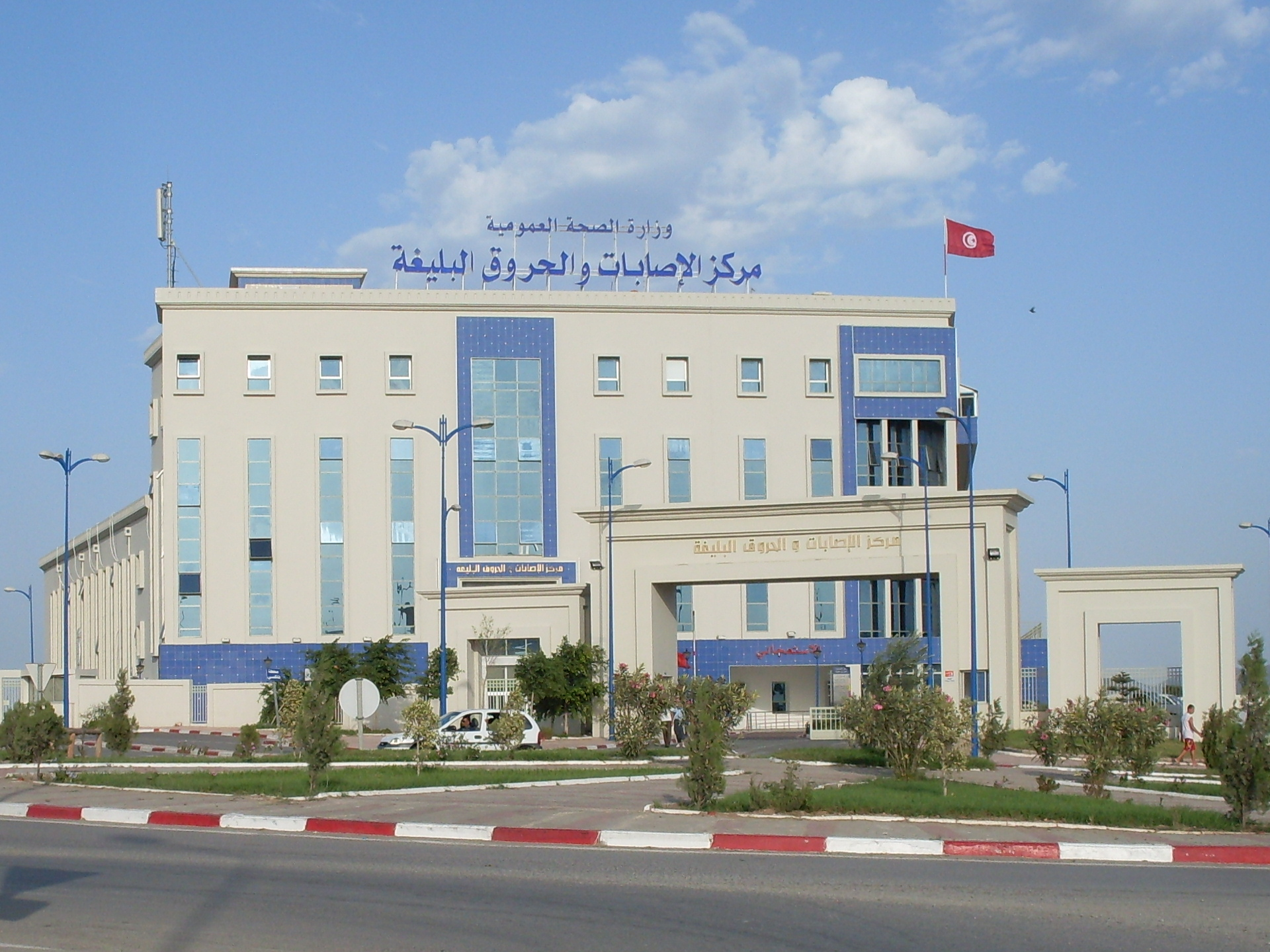
Ben Arous Burn and Trauma Centre where Bouazizi died

According to Bouazizi's sister and uncle, people immediately panicked when he caught fire, and one of them tried to douse him with water. Bouazizi had suffered burns on over 90% of his body before locals managed to stop the flames. He was taken by ambulance to a hospital, where he was placed in an intensive care unit. He was subsequently transferred to a second, larger hospital in Sfax, more than 110 kilometres (68 mi) away, and then to the Ben Arous Burn and Trauma Centre in the capital, 270 kilometres (170 mi) away.

On 31 December 2010, doctors reported that Bouazizi was in stable condition, and that he was showing a positive possibility of recovery. Despite the optimistic prognosis, Bouazizi remained comatose until his death. Bouazizi was visited in the hospital by then-President Zine El Abidine Ben Ali, who promised to send him to France for medical treatment according to Bouazizi's mother Benobia, but no such transfer ultimately occurred, leading to criticism.

Bouazizi died on 4 January 2011, at 5:30 p.m. local time. It is estimated that more than 5,000 people participated in the funeral procession that began in Sidi Bouzid and continued through to Bouazizi's native village, though police did not allow the procession to pass near the spot at which Bouazizi had burned himself. From the crowd, many were heard chanting "Farewell, Mohamed. We will avenge you. We weep for you today. We will make those who caused your death weep." He was buried at Garaat Bennour cemetery, 15 kilometres (10 mi) from Sidi Bouzid. His grave was described by Al-Jazeera as "simple" and surrounded by cacti, olive, and almond trees. In addition, a Tunisian flag flies next to the site. Tom Chesshyre also describes his tomb after visiting it: small, white, by a row of cacti, and with a simple inscription: "Martyr Mohamed Bouazizi. Peace for his life. And in the next life, have peace as well".

=== Investigation ===
An investigation was launched following Bouazizi's self-immolation to find the details leading up to his actions. On 20 December 2010, it was reported that Faida Hamdi, the officer who accosted Bouazizi the day of his immolation, was suspended along with the secretary-general (governor) of Sidi Bouzid, but this was subsequently denied by the latter. Some time later, Hamdi was arrested on orders from President Ben Ali and held in an unspecified town. A brother of Hamdi later stated that she had been arrested and detained twice, the first time following Ben Ali's visit to Bouazizi in the hospital and subsequent meeting with Bouazizi's mother and sister at his presidential palace. Hamdi's brother then says his sister and her aides were released following a short detention and the closing of the investigation which "confirmed her innocence". He said her second arrest was "in response to the demands of the Tunisian protesters", and that the Tunisian security authorities informed him that she was being held only for her own protection and would be released once the protesting ended.

According to Bouazizi's mother, Bouazizi chose to take this action because he had been humiliated, not because of the family's poverty. "It got to him deep inside, it hurt his pride," she said, referring to the police harassment. One of Bouazizi's sisters stated during an interview with Asharq Al-Awsat that their family intends to take legal action against all involved, "whether this is the municipal officers that slapped and insulted him, or the mayor [who] refused to meet him."

On 19 April 2011, the case against Hamdi was dropped and she was cleared of all charges after Bouazizi's mother withdrew the family's complaint against her. She stated, "It was a difficult but well-thought-out decision to avoid hatred and ... [to] help reconcile the residents of Sidi Bouzid." Hamdi had maintained her innocence, telling the court she did not slap Bouazizi, while her lawyer said the matter was "purely a political affair." Bouazizi's brother Salem supported the decision, saying, "All the money in the world can't replace the loss of Mohamed who sacrificed himself for freedom and for dignity." Large crowds of people outside the courtroom also appeared to have been satisfied by the Bouazizi family's decision, with some claiming Hamdi was being used as a scapegoat.

=== Protests ===
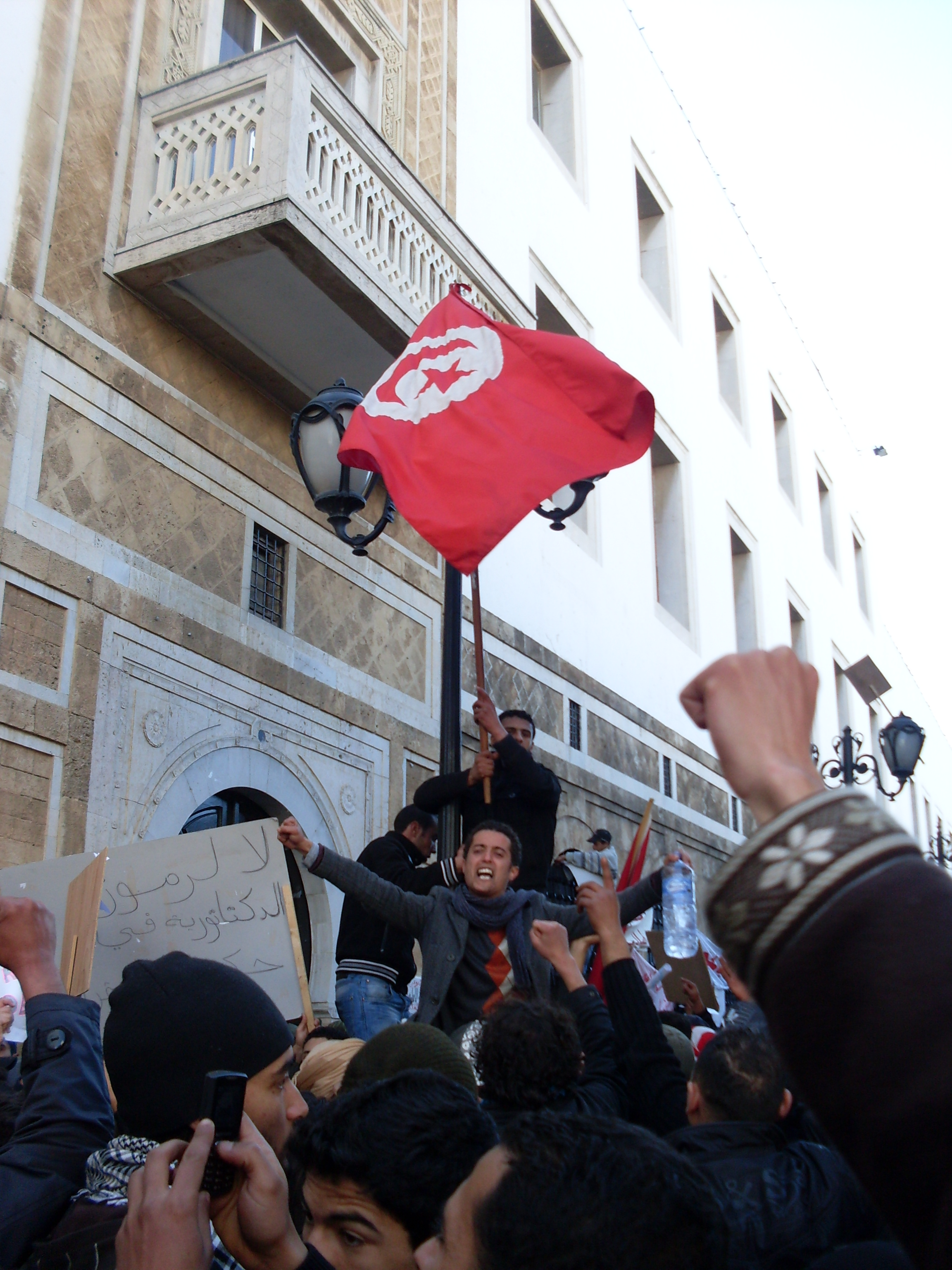
Tunisian street protests

Outraged by the events that led to Bouazizi's self-immolation, protests began in Sidi Bouzid within hours, building for more than two weeks, with attempts by police to quiet the unrest serving only to fuel what was quickly becoming a violent and deadly movement. After Bouazizi's death, the protests became widespread, moving into the more affluent areas and eventually into the capital. The anger and violence became so intense that President Ben Ali fled Tunisia with his family on 14 January 2011, trying first to go to Paris but being refused refuge by the French government. They were eventually welcomed into Saudi Arabia under "a long list of conditions" which included being barred from public exposure (including the media) and from working in politics, thus ending his 23-year rule and sparking "angry condemnation" among Saudis. In Tunisia, unrest persisted as a new regime took over, leaving many citizens of Tunisia feeling as though their needs were still being ignored.

== Legacy ==
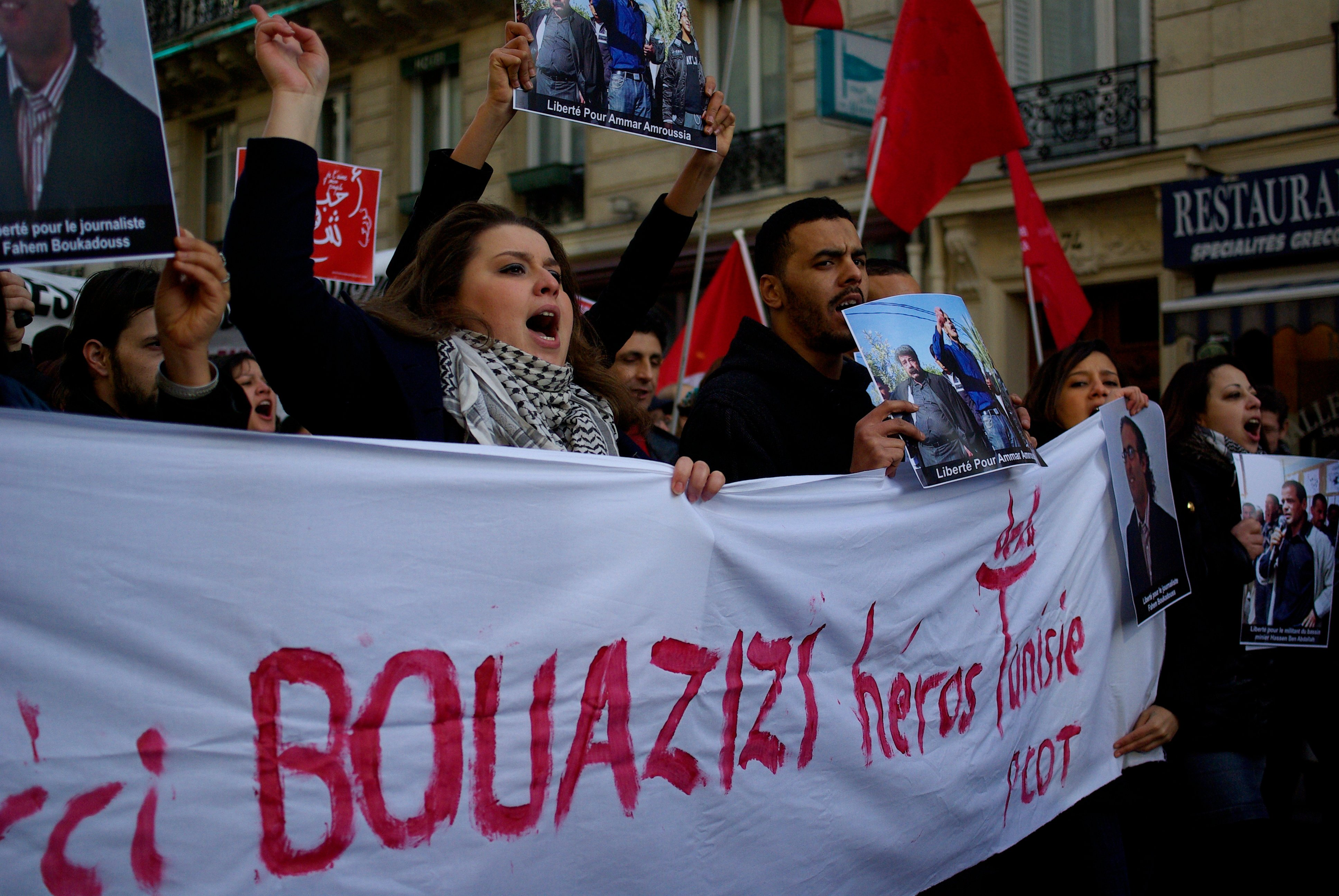
A French protest in support of "the Hero of Tunisia", on 15 January 2011

Many Arabs in the Middle East and North Africa regard Bouazizi as a hero and inspiration. He is credited with galvanising the frustrations of the region's youth against their governments into the mass demonstrations, revolts, and revolutions that have become known as the Arab Spring. One year on, Tunisian writer and academic Larbi Sadiki asserted that Bouazizi's self-immolation "changed the course of Arab political history", achieving the "breakthrough in the fight against autocracy". However, he also wrote it would take years before the act and the subsequent chain of events that followed were "profoundly grasped by historians and social scientists".

Bouazizi is considered a martyr by the Progressive Democratic Party (PDP) of Tunisia. Tunisian film director Mohamed Zran plans on making a feature film about Bouazizi, describing him as "a symbol for eternity". Tarak Ben Ammar, another Tunisian film director, intends to make a film on Bouazizi as well, stating he is "a hero for us as Tunisians and the Arab world as a whole".

Since suicide is forbidden in Islam, Bouazizi's self-immolation created controversy among scholarly Muslim circles. While Al-Azhar University, the most prestigious religious institution in the Sunni Muslim world, issued a fatwa (a religious opinion) stating "suicide violates Islam even when it is carried out as a social or political protest", influential Egyptian cleric Yusuf al-Qaradawi spoke sympathetically of Bouazizi.

On 4 February 2011, Bertrand Delanoë, the mayor of Paris, announced that, as a tribute to honour Bouazizi, a square in Paris will be named after him; the Mohamed-Bouazizi Square was unveiled four days later. On 17 February, the main square in Tunis that was previously called "November 7", after the date of Ben Ali's take-over in 1987, was renamed "January 14", though some had suggested it should honor Bouazizi (though a major roadway leading to the city's airport was renamed for him). Bouazizi was posthumously awarded the 2011 Sakharov Prize as one of "five representatives of the Arab people, in recognition and support of their drive for freedom and human rights". On 17 December, a cart statue was unveiled in Sidi Bouzid in honor of Bouazizi. Tunisia's first elected president Moncef Marzouki attended the ceremony, stating "Thank you to this land, which has been marginalised for centuries, for bringing dignity to the entire Tunisian people." Also, in Sidi Bouzid, as well as in the capital city of Tunis, both cities' respective main streets were renamed, "Boulevard Mohamed Bouazizi". The United Kingdom's The Times newspaper named Bouazizi person of the year for 2011.

"By Fire", a story by Moroccan author Tahar Ben Jelloun inspired by this incident, was published in The New Yorker edition of 16 September 2013. It is a fictional treatment; some details in the story differ from the factual account. An interview with the author about his story was posted to The New Yorker's "This Week in Fiction" on 9 September 2013. In 2011 Hamid Sadr, an Iranian author based in Austria, published the book "Der Fluch des Gemüsehändlers Mohamed Bouazizi" ("The curse of the greengrocer Mohamed Bouazizi"), in which he speculated whether the ensuing protest movement would lead towards democracy or theocracy.

On 17 December 2015, the Tunisian National Dialogue Quartet, the Nobel Peace Prize laureates of that year, as well as other civil society organizations, celebrated Mohamed Bouazizi and the start of the Arab spring five years after his death in a ceremony in Sidi Bouzid.

A Guardian article in 2020 noted that many Tunisians had become disillusioned at the bleak economic situation in the country, and "cursed" Bouazizi's name and legacy.

=== Related incidents ===
Bouazizi's actions triggered a number of self-immolations, in protests emulating his own, in several other countries in the Greater Middle East and Europe. In Algeria in particular, protests against rising food prices and spreading unemployment have resulted in many self-immolations. The first reported case following Bouazizi's death was that of Mohsen Bouterfif, a 37-year-old father of two, who set himself on fire when the mayor of Boukhadra, Tébessa Province refused to meet with him and others regarding employment and housing requests on 13 January 2011. According to a report in El-Watan, the mayor challenged him, saying if he had courage he would immolate himself by fire as Bouazizi had done. He died on 24 January. In nearby El Oued Province, Maamir Lotfi, a 36-year-old unemployed father of six, also denied a meeting with the governor, burned himself in front of the town hall of El Oued on 17 January, dying on 12 February. Abdelhafid Boudechicha, a 29-year-old day laborer who lived with his parents and five siblings, burned himself in Medjana on 28 January over employment and housing issues. He died the following day.

In the six months immediately after Mohamed Bouazizi's death on 4 January 2011, at least 107 Tunisians set themselves on fire. The men who immolated themselves were mostly young unmarried men from poor, rural areas, and had only basic education. Amenallah Messaadi, who collated the figures and is head of the Burns Centre, said that people "should stop adding fuel to the fire".

In Egypt, Abdou Abdel-Moneim Jaafar, a 49-year-old restaurant owner, set himself alight in front of the Egyptian Parliament. His act of protest helped instigate weeks of protest and, later, the resignation of Egyptian President Hosni Mubarak on 11 February 2011. In Saudi Arabia, an unidentified 65-year-old man died on 21 January 2011 after setting himself on fire in the town of Samtah, Jizan. This was apparently the kingdom's first known case of self-immolation.

Although these cases, with the exception of Egypt, did not garner the same kind of popular reaction that Bouazizi's case did in Tunisia, the Algerian, Yemeni, and Jordanian governments experienced significant protests and made major concessions in response to them. As such, these men and Bouazizi were hailed by some as "heroic martyrs of a new Middle Eastern revolution".

On 11 February 2011, in a case very similar to Bouazizi's, Noureddine Adnane, a 27-year-old Moroccan street vendor, set himself on fire in Palermo, Sicily, Italy in protest of the confiscation of his wares and the harassment that was inflicted on him by municipal officials. He died five days later. In Amsterdam, the Netherlands, Kambiz Roustay, a 36-year-old asylum seeker from Iran, set himself on fire on Dam Square in protest of being refused asylum. Roustay had fled the country for publishing works undermining the regime, and feared being tortured by the Iranian government upon his return.

== See also ==
- Nizar Issaoui
- 2011 Algerian self-immolations
- List of political self-immolations
- Thích Quảng Đức, set himself on fire in 1963 in protest of persecution of Buddhists in South Vietnam
- Romas Kalanta, set himself on fire in 1972 leading to riots in Communist Lithuania
- Jan Palach and Ryszard Siwiec, set themselves on fire in 1968 in separate incidents, both in protest against the suppression of the Prague Spring
