= The Repentant (2012 film) =

2012 film

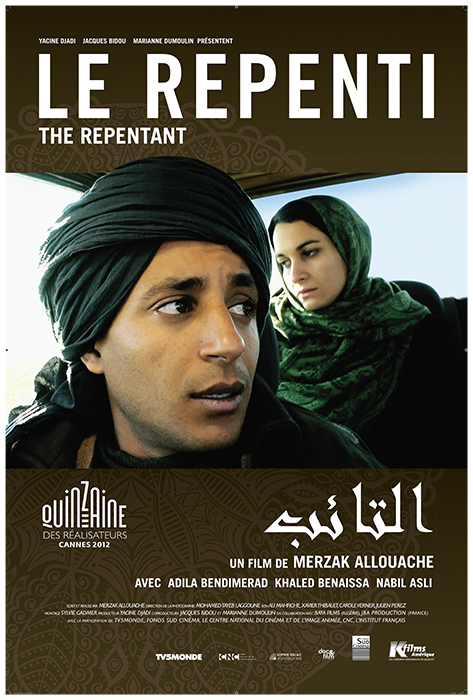
- Film poster
- Directed by: Merzak Allouache
- Written by: Merzak Allouache
- Starring: Ali Mahfiche; Xavier Thibault; Carole Verner; Julien Perez
- Cinematography: Mohamed Tayeb Laggoune
- Edited by: Sylvie Gadmer
- Release date: 18 May 2012 (Cannes)
- Running time: 87 minutes
- Country: Algeria
- Language: Arabic

The Repentant (Arabic: التائب) is a 2012 Algerian drama film directed by Merzak Allouache. It was screened in the Directors' Fortnight section at the 2012 Cannes Film Festival. The film won the FIPRESCI Award for Best Asian Film at the 17th International Film Festival of Kerala. The film was inspired by a true story.

== Plot ==
In the high flatlands of Algeria, Islamic terrorists continue to spread terror. Rashid, a young jihadist leaves the mountains to return to his village. In keeping with the law of "pardon and national harmony", he has to surrender to the police and give up his weapon. He thus receives amnesty and becomes a "repenti". He is given a job in a café and a place to live. But the law cannot erase his crimes, and for Rashid, it is the beginning of a one way journey of violence, secrets and manipulation. He attempts to atone for his crimes by giving closure to a family that his "brothers" hurt. Not everyone is as thrilled by Rachid's return as his parents, and some of the men from his village accuse him of having been at a massacre where their families were killed. Rachid denies having been there, but they do not all believe him. One of the men attacks Rachid one night. Rachid fights back, and ends up killing the man with his knife. The police investigate his disappearance and the murder.

Lakhdar is a pharmacist in the same neighborhood where Rachid works. He receives a shocking and mysterious call which prompts him to call his estranged wife back to town. Even once she returns, they are distant and both in great emotional pain. They impatiently await another call from the mystery caller, which finally leads them on a journey to the mountains, still inhabited by terrorists, to get closure from the trauma that drove them apart. Lakhdar's wife is very angry with Rachid, and yells at him for making them pay for closure on the trauma that she accuses him of having caused them. He once again denies involvement, saying that he only heard the story of what had happened and not participated, adding that those responsible had died a month later. This does nothing to alleviate the loss that she feels.

== Cast ==
- Nabil Asli as Rashid
- Adila Bendimerad
- Khaled Benaissa as Lakhdar

== Awards ==
2012 17th International Film Festival of Kerala

- the FIPRESCI Award for Best Asian Film
