= Mohamed-Bouazizi Square =

Square in Paris, France

Mohamed Bouazizi Square
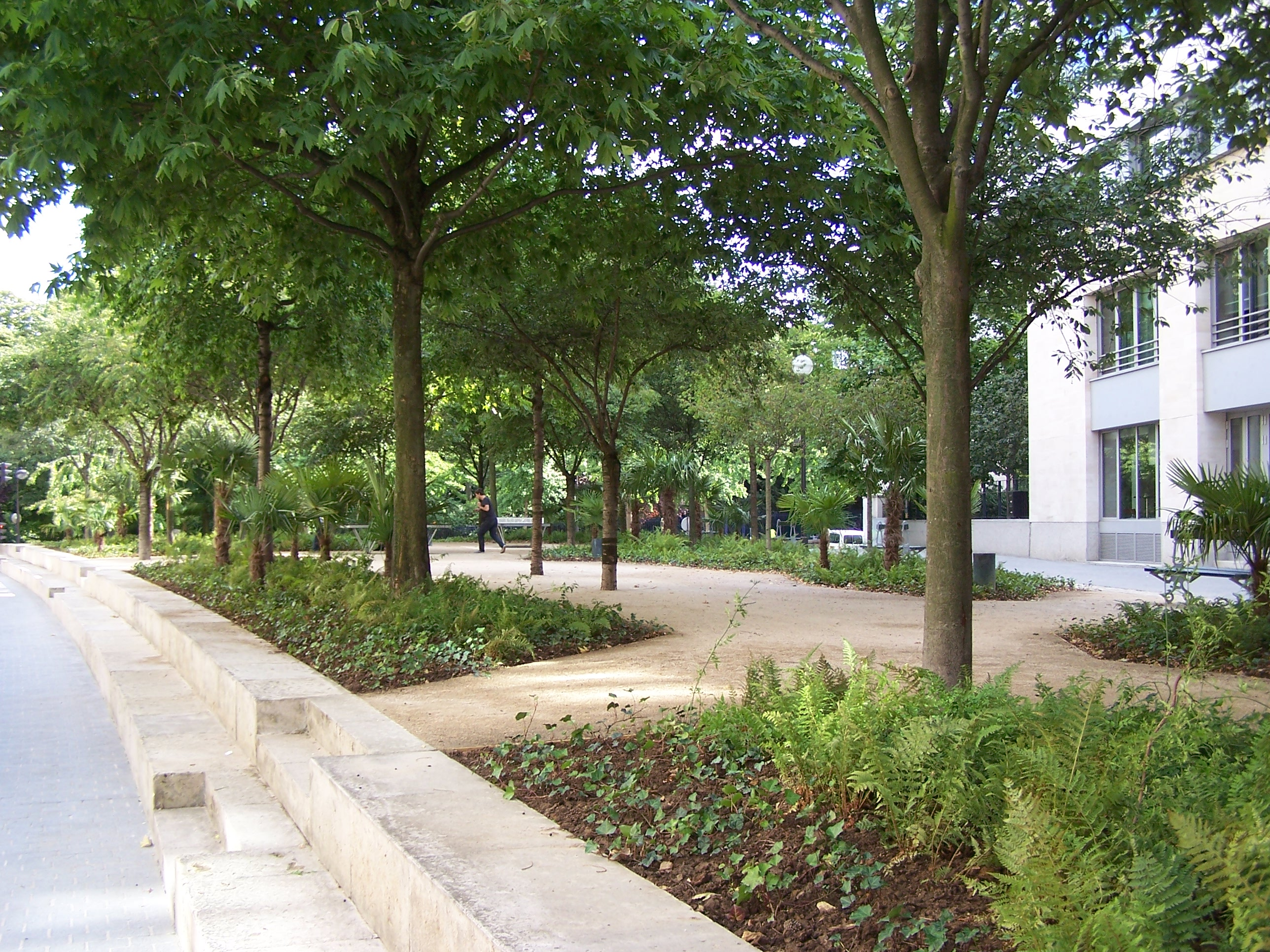
- View of the place

General information
- Location: Avenue de la Sibelle, Parc Montsouris district 14, Paris
- Coordinates: 48.8247839°N 2.338012°E
- System: Lane

History
- Opened: 2001
- Rebuilt: 8 February 2011
Location

Mohamed Bouazizi Square (French: Place Mohamed-Bouazizi) is a lane located in the Parc Montsouris district of the 14th arrondissement of Paris.

== Location and access ==
The Mohamed-Bouazizi Square is served nearby by the RATP Bus Network 21 62.

== Origin of the name ==
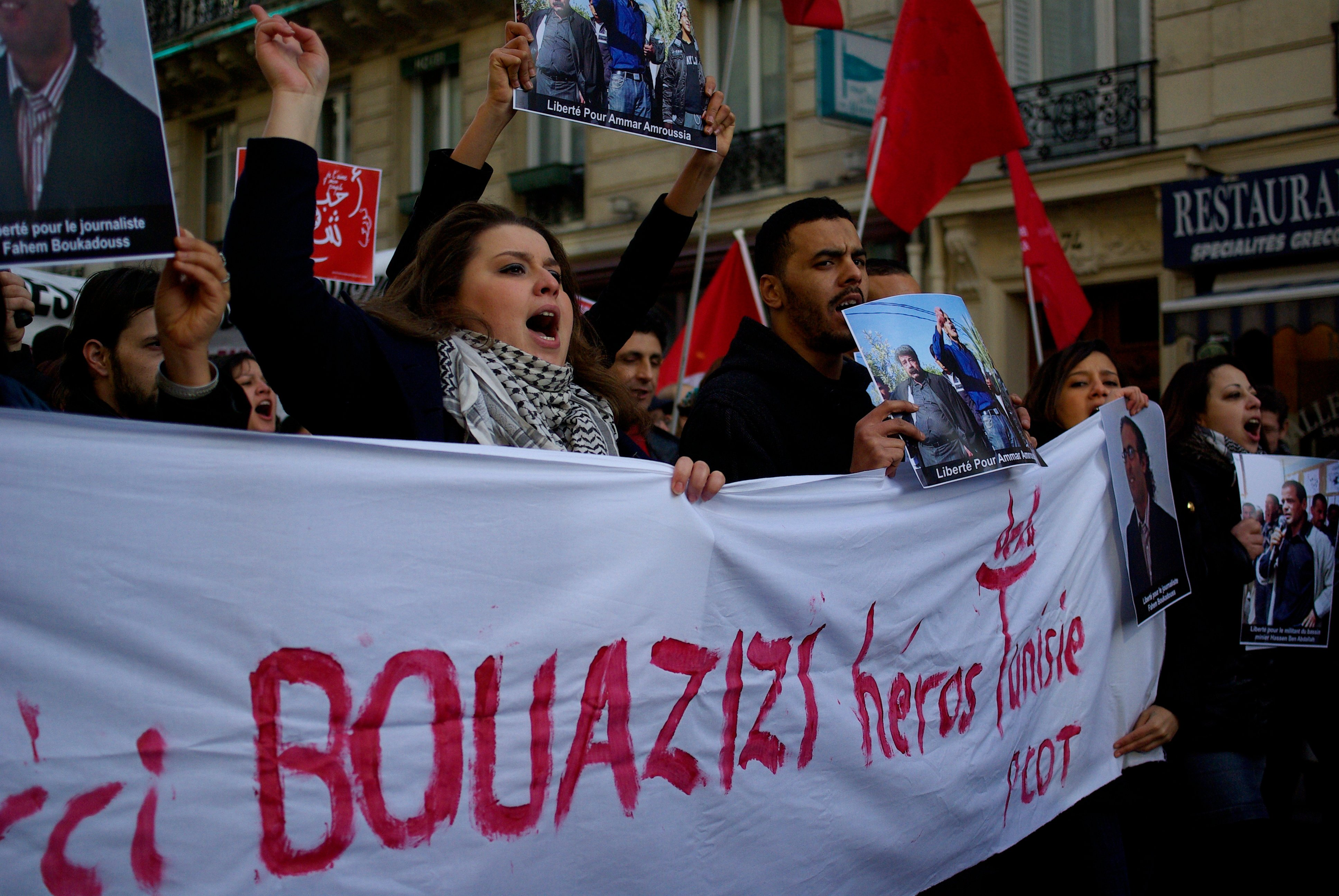
French support Bouazizi

It bears the name of Mohamed Bouazizi, whose self-immolation in Sidi Bouzid in Tunisia, in December 2010, was one of the triggers of the 2011 Tunisian Revolution and, which extended to the 2011 Arab Spring.

== History ==
The square, overlooking the avenue de la Sibelle, was built as part of the development of the ZAC Alésia-Montsouris under the provisional name of "route BO / 14" and took its current name in 2011.

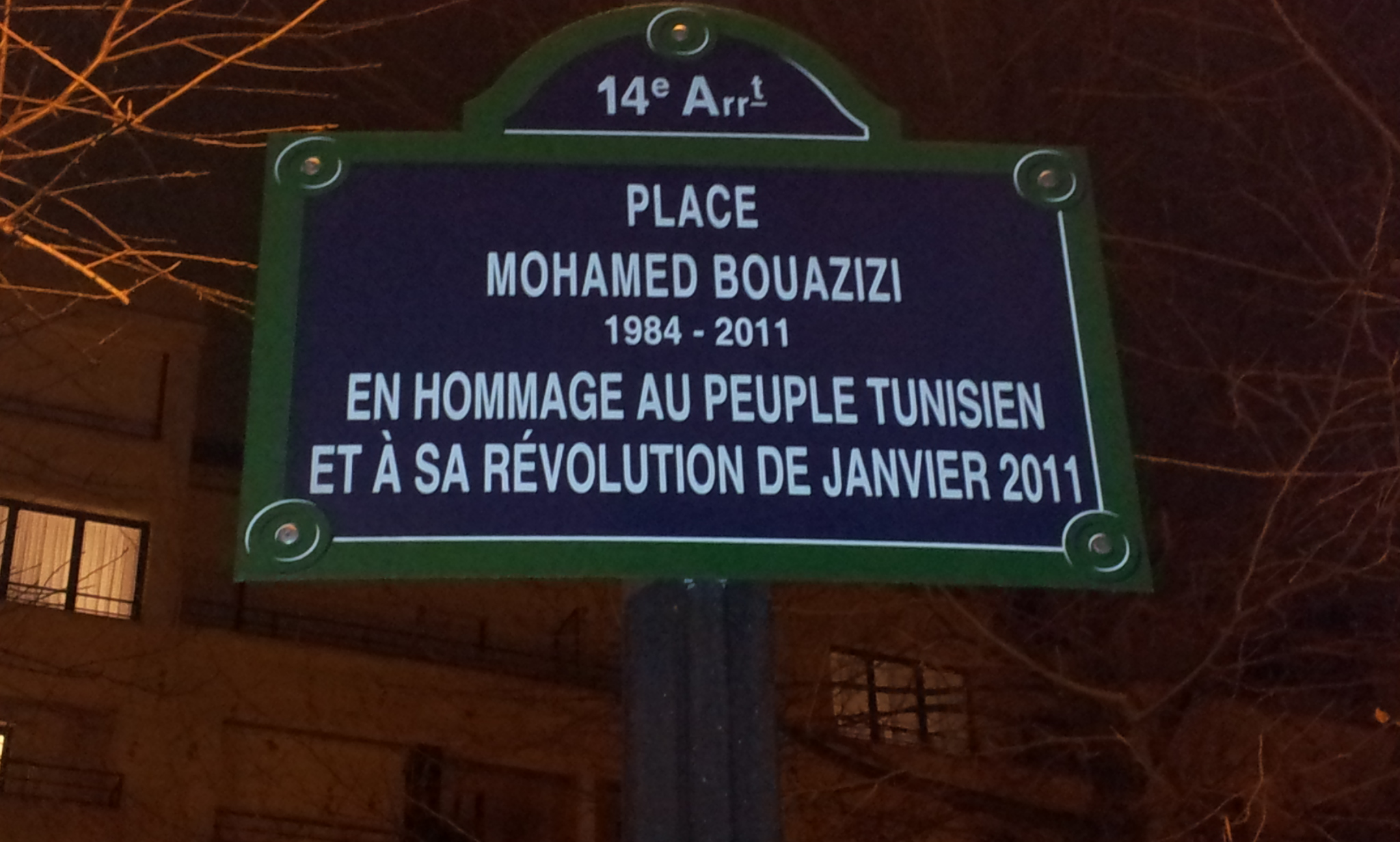
Plaque of Mohamed Bouazizi Square.

The name of the place was adopted by a unanimous vote by Council of Paris on 8 February 2011 although it is generally required to wait at least five years after the death of a person.

The place was inaugurated on 30 June 2011 by the Mayor of Paris. Bertrand Delanoë, in the presence of the mother and members of the young man's family, as well as Mokhtar Trifi, president of the Tunisian Human Rights League. The plaque of the square indicates: "In tribute to the Tunisian people and its revolution of January 2011".

== Remarkable buildings and memorials ==
The square, originally planted with European tree species, is also elaborated with palm trees, north African, of great value. There is also a games area, with its cement tables for people to play table tennis. This game area overlooks Parc Montsouris.

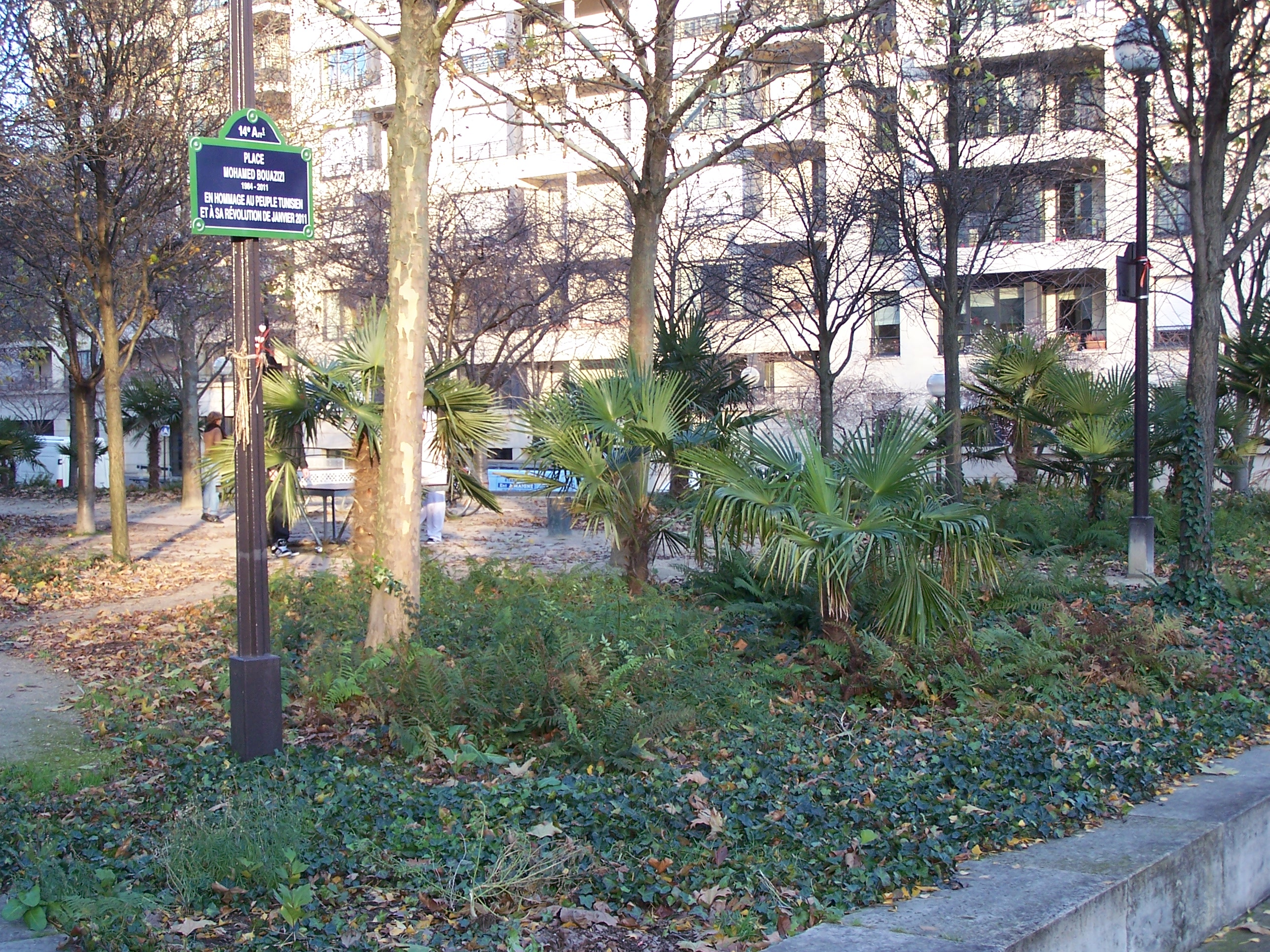
The playground
