= Merzak Allouache =

Algerian film director

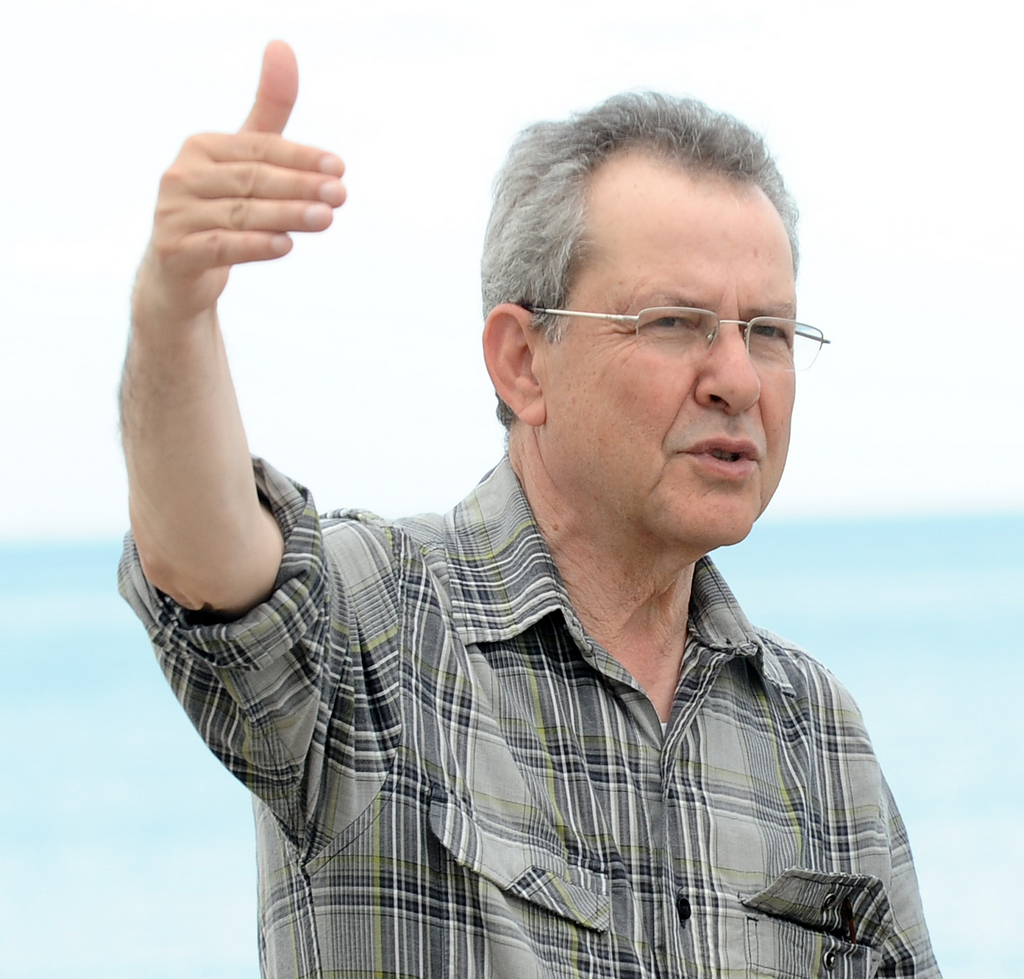
- Allouache in 2017
- Born: 6 October 1940 (age 85); Algiers, Algeria
- Occupation: Film director
- Years active: 1972-present
- Notable work: Omar Gatlato

Merzak Allouache (born 6 October 1940) is an Algerian film director and screenwriter. His 1976 film Omar Gatlato was later entered into the 10th Moscow International Film Festival where it won the Silver Prize. His 1996 Salut cousin! was submitted to the 69th Academy Awards in the category of Best Foreign Language Film. He is one of the most influential Algerian filmmakers, considered by some to be the most important. He is the only Algerian filmmaker who devoted most, if not all, of his cinematic work to his native country.

== Early life ==
Merzak Allouache was born in the Algiers neighborhood of Bab el-Oued. His father was a Kabyle Berber postal worker and his mother was an Algerian housewife from Casbah. Allouache was only ten years old when the Algerian Liberation War began in 1954 and he was only eighteen during the year of independence in 1962.

== Career ==
=== Studies ===
Merzak Allouache began his studies in 1964 at the Institute for Cinema in Algiers. While there, he directed his graduation film, Croisement, as well as a short film, Le Voleur. When the Institute for Cinema closed, the students were redirected to Lodz or Paris. Allouache completed his studies at l’IDHEC (now called La Fémis) in Paris.

=== News career ===
Returning to Algeria, he spent a few months at the Algerian News Office and then was dismissed, along with his colleagues from the Institute for Cinema’s graduating class after a petition demanding more responsibility for the workers. To calm the protest, the group of alumni of the Institute for Cinema including Allouache was sent to France for a three-month internship at the Office de Radiodiffusion Télévision Française (ORTF). He remained in France for several years and enrolled at the École pratique des hautes études with Marc Ferro and took the course "Analysis of 20th century film documents".

=== Film career ===
Allouache returned to Algeria in 1973 and worked on organizing CinéBus campaigns in support of the agrarian revolution. He worked as an advisor for the Ministry of Culture. He directed a documentary film about this work called Nous et la révolution agraire (Us and the Agrarian Revolution) in 1972. In 1974, he co-directed for the Office National pour le Commerce et l'Industrie Cinématographique (ONCIC) Tipasa l'ancienne, a documentary on the site of Tipasa, in co-production with FR3 Marseille. Before joining ONCIC as a director in 1975, he was assistant director on Le Vent du Sud directed by Mohamed Slim Riad, also in 1974.

He gained international fame in 1977 by directing his first feature film Omar Gatlato (1976), which takes a cynical but realistic look at the alienation of men in Algerian society, which was selected at the Semaine de la Critique in Cannes and won a Silver Medal at the Moscow Film Festival. Then he directed Les Aventures d'un héros in 1978, a film about an Algerian father who falsely labels his infant son as the hero his tribe has been waiting for, which received the Thanit d'or at the Carthage Film Festival, and directed L'Homme qui regardait les fenêtres in 1982.

Allouache returned to France and wrote a screenplay for TF1, Parlez après le signal sonore, and, in 1987, directed a feature film Un amour à Paris, a love story about two Algerians: a model and an ex-con, screened in the Perspectives of French Cinema section at the Cannes Film Festival, winning the Perspectives of French Cinema Prize.

He returned to Algeria in 1988 in the aftermath of the October riots. He filmed video documentaries on the political situation with many interviews that were gathered in three documentaries for ARTE: L'Après-Octobre, Femmes en mouvements, and Vie et mort des journalistes algériens. In 1989, he directed a satirical program for Algerian television, La Boîte à chique, and then joined the National Audiovisual Council, a structure in charge of reforming cinematography when the Ministry of Culture was dissolved. In 1992, he directed a documentary for the BBC, Our War, Voice of Ramadan. In 1993, as Algeria sank into violence, he directed in extremis a feature film, Bab El-Oued City which follows the conflict between a young Algerian man and the local Islamic fundamentalists, screened in the Un Certain Regard section at the Cannes Film Festival.

He was forced to leave for France once again in the 1990s due to dangerous conditions for working artists In 1996, he directed a film about two cousins navigating racism in Paris, Salut Cousin, which was screened in the Directors' Fortnight at the Cannes Film Festival, won a Thanit d'or at the Carthage Film Festival, and was submitted to the 69th Academy Awards. After directing a series of films and TV movies, he returned to Algeria in 1999.

Since 2000, Allouache has alternated his productions or co-productions between Algeria and France, where he lives. In 2003, he directed Chouchou, starring Gad Elmaleh, about a Maghrebi transgender woman who settles in Paris to find her nephew. He directed Bab el-Web in 2004, a comedy about the effects of the internet on Algerian youth. This film was partially funded by French sources, with the stipulation that at least fifty-one percent of the dialogue be recorded in French, despite the fact that all of the characters were Algerian.

In 2009, Allouache wrote and directed the film Harragas, the story of young Algerian refugees who fled their home country on small boats into the Mediterranean. The film was partly funded by the Algerian government. However, they did not like the end result and the Algerian government has subsequently boycotted Allouache’s films and refused further support. His 2011 film, Normal!, about a filmmaker in the aftermath of the December riots, won the award for Best Film at the 2011 Doha Tribeca Film Festival. This film was a commentary on the Algerian government’s amnesty policy for terrorists. In 2012 he directed Le repenti (The Repentant), a film about an Islamist released from prison who struggles to understand forgiveness, which was screened at the Directors' Fortnight at the Cannes Film Festival. It won a FIPRESCI Award at the 17th International Film Festival of Kerala. In 2013 Les terrasses (The Rooftops) about life in Bab el-Oued, was screened at the Venice Film Festival and in 2015 Madame courage, about a drug-user who tries to kick his habit, was screened at the Venice Film Festival. In 2016 a documentary fiction Enquête au paradis, which combines in-person interviews with a dramatized road trip was screened at the FIPA in Biarritz (Fipa d'or) at the Berlin Film Festival, and in 2017 Vent divin was screened at the Toronto Film Festival.

== Awards ==
His 2011 film Normal! won the award for Best Film at the 2011 Doha Tribeca Film Festival. In 2012, his film The Repentant was screened in the Directors' Fortnight section at the 2012 Cannes Film Festival. It won the FIPRESCI Award for Best Asian Film at the 17th International Film Festival of Kerala.

== Personal life ==
Allouache has one daughter, Bahia Allouache, who is also a filmmaker.

== Selected filmography ==
- Omar Gatlato - 1976
- Adventures of a Hero (Mughamarat batal) - 1979
- L'Homme qui regardait les fenêtres - 1986
- Un amour à Paris - 1987
- L'Après-Octobre - 1989
- Bab El-Oued City - 1994
- Lumière and Company (Lumière et compagnie) - 1995
- Dans la décapotable - 1996
- Hi Cousin! (Salut cousin!) - 1996
- Algiers-Beirut: A Souvenir (Alger-Beyrouth: Pour mémoire) - 1998, TV
- À bicyclette - 2001, TV
- The Other World (L'Autre monde) - 2001
- Chouchou - 2003
- Bab el web - 2005
- Tamanrasset - 2008, TV
- Harragas - 2009
- Normal! - 2011
- Tata Bakhta - 2011
- The Repentant (El taaib) - 2012
- La baie d'Alger - 2012
- The Rooftops (Es-Stouh) - 2013
- Madame Courage - 2015
- Investigating Paradise (Enquête au paradis) - 2017
- Divine Wind (Rih rabani) - 2018
- La Famille - 2021
