= Rayhana Obermeyer =

- Born: November 1, 1961 (age 64)
- Other name: Rayhanae
- Occupations: Actress, director, playwright
- Notable work: Let Them Come

Rayhana Obermeyer (born November 1, 1963), also known as Rayhana, is an Algerian actress, comedienne and playwright and director.

== Biography ==
Obermeyer was born in Algeria. She moved to France, in 2000, at the age of 36, and began pursuing an acting career there.

== Filmography ==
=== As actor ===
- Ce Chemin Devant Moi, 2012.
- Let Them Come, 2015.

=== As director ===
- À Mon Âge je me Cache Encore Pour Fumer (I Still Hide To Smoke) 2016.
