= Doha Tribeca Film Festival =

Former film festival

The Doha Tribeca Film Festival (DTFF) was an annual five-day film festival that was organised from 2009 to 2012 to promote Arab and international films, and to develop a sustainable film industry in Qatar. One of Qatar's largest entertainment events, it attracted over 50,000 guests in 2010.

The festivals were organised by the Doha Film Institute (DFI), which was founded by Sheikha Al-Mayassa bint Hamad bin Khalifa Al-Thani which implements, consolidates and oversees film initiatives in Qatar. The Festival was launched in 2009 through a cultural partnership between DFI and Tribeca Enterprises. The Festival was led by Abdulaziz bin Khalid Al-Khater, Executive Director of DFI.

== DTFF 2010 ==
The second Festival took place October 26–30, 2010 featuring 51 films from 35 countries including four world premieres. Over 50,000 guests attended the Festival screenings and events.

Celebrities who attended the Festival in 2010 include Robert De Niro, Salma Hayek Pinnault, Julian Schnabel, Freida Pinto, Naomie Harris, Justin Chadwick, Sam Feuer, Hiam Abbas, Yousra, Adel Emam, Paula Wagner, David M Thompson, Mira Nair, Randall Wallace, Kevin Spacey, Rachid Bouchareb, Basma Hassan, Yasmine Al Massri, Stephane Rolland, and Mirette El Hariri.

The Award for Best Film went to The First Grader, which was also the closing film of the festival.

== DTFF 2011 ==
The 3rd annual DTFF took place from October 25–29, 2011 at Katara Cultural Village, Doha.

Approximately 51 films from 35 countries were screened at the festival, including nine world premieres, four international premieres and 26 MENA premieres within various themed sections, showcasing World and Middle Eastern Cinema. The Festival featured Arab and international film competitions, including Best Arab Film, Best Arab Filmmaker, Audience Awards for Best Narrative, Best Documentary and Arab Short Films.

The award for Best Film went to Normal! directed by Merzak Allouache.

== DTFF 2012 ==
The fourth edition of DTFF, held from November 17–24, was expanded to eight days. Indoor and outdoor screenings took place at Katara Cultural Village and Museum of Islamic Arts (MIA). DTFF 2012 showcased over 87 films from across the globe under distinct themed categories including Arab Film Competition, Made in Qatar, Contemporary World Cinema and Special Screenings.

== See also ==
- Doha Film Institute
- Arab cinema
