= Harraga =

North African illegal migrants to Europe

Harragas, sometimes spelled Haraga (Harrag in the singular form) (from Algerian Arabic حراقة, ḥarrāga, ḥarrāg, "those who burn") are North African migrants who illegally immigrate to Europe or to European-controlled islands sometimes in makeshift boats. The term Harraga literally means “to burn” alluding to the migrants practice of burning their identity papers and personal documents in order to prevent identification by authorities in Europe. The North African men who partake in illegal migration refer to themselves as Harragas (burners).

The Harraga are from the Maghreb, they are specifically Algerians, Moroccans, or Tunisians and are predominantly men between the ages of twenty and thirty five years old. The term Harraga is also used in reference to the act of covertly crossing over a country's border or transgression of a law. It can also refer to smugglers and human-traffickers who directly facilitate regular and irregular migration.

== Etymology ==
Harraga (in arabic: حراقة) is an Algerian neologism created from the Arabic word “hrag,” meaning “burn” or “those who burn” the borders. It is used to describe irregular North African migrants who attempt to leave for Europe by boat. The verb 'to burn' can also mean 'to jump a queue' or to 'run a light'. The word derives from Algerian Arabic, designating "those who burn.", meaning those who burn their identification documents and seek their fortune as asylum-seekers in Europe.

== Overview ==
The earliest references to the phenomenon of irregular migration of undocumented North African migrants (Harraga) to Europe can be traced to the 1980s. The Harraga who migrate to Europe do not necessarily come from the least educated or the poorest communities in their respective countries.

On the Mediterranean coast of North Africa, Algerian, Tunisian, and Moroccan harragas typically hope to cross the Strait of Gibraltar in order to reach Spain. Additionally, harragas also sometimes manage to complete the voyage from Africa to the island nation of Malta, or the Italian island of Lampedusa. From here they often go on to emigrate to other regions of Europe.

On the Atlantic coast of North Africa, Mauritanian and Senegalese harragas set off in hope of reaching the Spanish-controlled Canary Islands in small, flat-bottomed boats referred to in Spanish as "patera", or in rigid or inflatable rafts, (such as "Zodiac" rafts), or even paddle boats. Boats such as these are not designed for ocean crossings and the death rates for harragas are very high. The motivations for undertaking this extremely risky act are twofold: profound economic poverty and extreme political repression, both widespread throughout North Africa.

== Film ==
Algerian film director Moussa Haddad directed a film entitled Harraga Blues, which chronicles the illegal immigration of an Algerian youth (harrag) to Spain. The film premiered at the Abu Dhabi Film Festival in October 2012, and was released in 2013.

== Bibliography ==
- Sansal, Boualem. Harraga, (Gallimard, 2007) (French) ISBN 978-2-07-034329-4
- Sansal, Boualem. Harraga, (Merlin, 2007) (German) ISBN 978-3-87536-254-1
- Lozano, Antonio. Harraga, (Zech, Tenerife 2011, first ed. Zoela, Granada 2002) (Spanish) ISBN 978-84-938151-2-7
- Lozano, Antonio. Harraga, (Zech, Tenerife 2011) (German) ISBN 978-84-938151-1-0
- Arianna Obinu. Harraga, il sogno europeo passa attraverso la Sardegna (2006-2012), Livorno, Edizioni Erasmo, 2013 (Italiano) (ISBN 9788898598014)
