= Arezki =

Arezki or Areski (Tamazight: ⴰⵔⴻⵣⵇⵉ) is both a masculine given name and a surname, commonly used in Kabylia in northern Algeria. A variant of the given name is Rezki (Tamazight: ⵔⴻⵣⴽⵉ). Notable people with the name include:

== Given name ==
=== Areski ===
- Areski Belkacem (1940–2026), French-Algerian singer, multi-instrumentalist, comedian, and composer
- Areski Nebti (1926–1994), Algerian actor

=== Arezki ===
- Arezki Aït-Larbi (born 1955), Algerian journalist and human rights activist
- Arezki Hamza Dembri (born 2004), Algerian footballer
- Arezki Meddad (1899–1942), Algerian nationalist figure
- Arezki Metref (born 1952), Algerian writer, poet, and journalist

=== Rezki ===
- Rezki Amrouche (born 1970), Algerian football player, and manager
- Rezki Hamroune (born 1996), Algerian footballer
- Rezki Zerarti (1938–2024), Algerian painter

== Surname ==
- Hakim Arezki (born 1983), French football 5-a-side player of Algerian origin
- Mhamed Arezki (born 1984), French actor of Algerian origin
