= Kaci Ksentini =

Algerian actor

- قاسي قسنطيني
- Born: Mohamed Ouchen; 1 January 1923; Constantine, Algeria
- Died: 17 March 1999 (aged 76); Algiers, Algeria
- Citizenship: Algerian
- Occupation: Actor
- Notable work: L'Opium et le Bâton; Le Vent du sud L'olivier de Boulhilet (see filmography)

Kaci Ksentini (in Arabic: قاسي قسنطيني; born Mohamed Ouchen; 1 January 1923 in Constantine – 17 March 1999 in Algiers), was an Algerian actor and a leading figure in Algerian cinema and theatre, particularly active during the 1960s–1980s. He is best known for his roles in historical and social films from the post-independence period

== Biography ==
Kaci Ksentini was born in Constantine in 1923. He began his artistic career in theatre before turning to cinema after Algeria gained independence. He appeared in several major Algerian films in the 1960s and 1970s, often playing characters marked by the historical context (revolution, social struggles) or comic characters, depending on the production. He died on 17 March 1999 in Algiers.

== Career ==
Kaci Ksentini made a name for himself in post-independence Algerian cinema by starring in films about the war of liberation like L'Opium et le Bâton and post-war Algerian society like Le Vent du sud.

== Filmography ==
Sources:

- 1969 : L'Opium et le Bâton
- 1969 : Les Hors-la-loi (1968)
- 1975 : Le Vent du sud
- 1977 : Barrières
- 1978 : L'olivier de Boulhilet
- 1979 : Le Retour
- 1980 : Kahla Oua Beida

== See also ==
- Cinema of Algeria
- List of Algerian films
- Theatre of Algeria
- Kahla Oua Beida
- L'olivier de Boulhilet
