= Djamel Bounab =

- Born: Djamel Bounab
- Occupations: Actor, theatre, television and film performer
- Notable work: Une main pour une sorcière; La mélodie d'espoir

Djamel Bounab is an Algerian actor and comedian active in theatre, television and cinema since the 1970s. He became known for his roles in Algerian television series and sitcoms and has appeared in several popular films and series.

== Biography ==
Djamel Bounab began his artistic career with the JFLN troupe (Bab El Oued), then joined in 1974 the Popular Theatre Troupe (Troupe Théâtrale Populaire, TTP) directed by Hassan El-Hassani. At the same time, he took classes at the Algiers Conservatory (Andalusian music, solfeggio) before devoting himself to theatre, and later to television and cinema. After completing his national service (1975–1977), he made numerous appearances in film and television, often in supporting roles, but appreciated by both audiences and local critics.

== Career ==
After his beginnings in theatre, Djamel Bounab appeared in several Algerian television and film productions. He is known for his roles in series and sitcoms such as Nass Mlah City, Djemai Family, as well as for roles in dramas like Chafika and Mawîid maâa El Qadar.

== Filmography ==
- 1981: Un toit, une famille (TV film) — first appearance in cinema (Rabah Laradji)
- 1991: Une main pour une sorcière (Achour Kessaï)
- 2002–2005: Nass Mlah City (TV series) — guest appearances
- 2007: Nuits d'Arabie (film)
- Other series and TV films: La Mélodie d'espoir, Imarat l'Hadj Lakhdar, Le Testament / La Wasiya and several dramas broadcast during the month of Ramadan.

== See also ==
- List of Algerian films
