= Ali Yahia Abdennour =

Algerian politician and lawyer (1921–2021)

- Born: 18 January 1921; Aït Yahia, French Algeria
- Died: 25 April 2021 (aged 100); Algiers, Algeria
- Occupations: Lawyer, politician, activist

Ali Yahia Abdennour (Kabyle: Aɛli Yaḥya Σavdennur; January 18, 1921 – April 25, 2021) was an Algerian politician, lawyer and human rights activist.

== Early life and education ==
Ali Yahia Abdennour was born on 18 January 1921, in the village of Lemkherda, Aït Yahia, now a wilayah of Tizi Ouzou, in what was French Algeria. He completed his primary education at Tizi Ouzou and finished his secondary studies at Médéa.

== Youth and the Algerian War ==
Abdennour became a teacher and was assigned for four years to Affreville (today Khemis Miliana), birthplace of the future commander of Wilayah IV, Si M'hammed Bougara, whom he later met in hiding. In 1943, it was mobilized by the Alliance who took over Algeria from the Vichy France. He was decorated the following year.

In 1945, he joined the Algerian People's Party-Movement for the Triumph of Democratic Liberties at the time of Algeria war and he left the PPA-MTLD party during the Berber crisis in 1949. In 1955, he joined the FLN. In 1956, he was arrested and later was placed under house arrest, from 1957 to 1960. Following his release in 1961, Abdennour became secretary general of the UGTA (General Union of Algerian Workers). After independence, he was elected deputy for the Wilayah of Tizi Ouzou Province. In 1963, he joined the rebellion of Hocine Aït Ahmed and later stood against Ahmed Ben Bella.

== Minister, lawyer, and human rights activist ==
Ali Yahia Abdennour became Minister of Transport and Public Works, then Minister of Agriculture and Agrarian Reform for a year in the government of Houari Boumédiène, between 1965 and 1968. After studying law, he became a lawyer. He was arrested in 1983 and released in 1984.

In 1985, two groups of Algiers, one led by Omar Ménouar and the group of Tizi Ouzou represented by Ali Yahia Yahia, competed to control the League of Human Rights of Algeria which was not yet officially established. Ali Yahia Abdennour could not be elected president, because he was perceived to be close to the Berber movement. Ali Yahia formed another league immediately, but he could be arrested. According to the Algerian authorities, he had no approval.

After the LADH (Algerian League for Human Rights) was established by the Algerian authorities in 1987 and chaired by lawyer Miloud Brahimi, Ali Yahia was chosen as Honorary President of the Algerian League for the Defense of Human Rights (LADDH) which he had founded together with Saïd Saadi and Arezki Ait Larbi.

Abdennour opposed the interruption of the 1991 electoral process and defended some of the leaders of the FIS . In 1994, he participated in the Sant' Egidio conference in Rome. In 2011, he took part in the call of the National Coordination for Change and Democracy.

On 8 October 2017, together with Ahmed Taleb Ibrahimi and Rachid Benyelles they declared the state of incapacity of President Abdelaziz Bouteflika, who had been affected by a stroke.

== Family ==
On 20 May 2018, his eldest son, Amokrane, died.

== "Hirak" Movement ==
On 18 May 2019, in the midst of the 2019–2020 Algerian protests together with Ahmed Taleb Ibrahimi and Rachid Benyelles they called, to postpone the 2019 Algerian presidential election and to launch a dialogue between the army and representatives of the demonstrators to put in place a political transition.

On 15 October, Abdennour and several other personalities, including the former head of government Ahmed Benbitour, former Minister of Foreign Affairs Ahmed Taleb Ibrahimi, former Minister of Culture Abdelaziz Rahabi and former Minister of Education Ali Benmohamed, as well as lawyer Abdelghani Badi, and academics Nacer Djabi and Louisa Ait Hamadouche called for "a new reading of reality", at the departure of the dignitaries of the regime, as well as holding the presidential election after a dialogue.

On 10 December, with 18 other personalities -- including Ahmed Taleb Ibrahimi, Mostefa Bouchachi Ali Benmohamed, Abdelaziz Rahabi, Ahmed Benbitour, Abdelghani Badi, Nacer Djabi, and Louisa Ait Hamadouche -- Abdennour called for not interfering with Algerians' voting.

== Death ==
Abdennour died on 25 April 2021, at the age of 100.

== Mandates ==
- Member of the Constituent Assembly (1962–1964)
- Member of Parliament (1964–1965)
- Minister of Public Works and Transport (1965–1966)
- Minister of Agriculture and Agrarian Reform (1966–1968)
