= L'olivier de Bouhlilet =

L'Olivier de Boulhilet
- زيتون بوهليلات
- Directed by: Mohamed Nadir Azizi
- Written by: Khaled Benmiloud (based on a radio story by Malek Haddad)
- Starring: Azzeddine Medjoubi; Zoulikha Laouadj; Himoud Brahimi; Antar Hellal; Kaci Ksentini
- Cinematography: Dahou Boukerche
- Music by: Cherif Korteby
- Release date: 1978
- Running time: 90 minutes
- Country: Algeria
- Language: Arabic

L'Olivier de Bouhlilet (Arabic: زيتون بوهليلات) is a 1978 Algerian film by director Mohamed Nadir Azizi. The film is based on a radio story by Malek Haddad, rewritten by Professor Khaled Benmiloud.

== Plot ==
Belkacem, a young unemployed man from the Saharan village of Bouhlilet, learns from a dervish that there is a water source near the village's large olive tree. After digging, Belkacem finds water, and when he informs the villagers, they take up the cause and urge the municipality to install a water supply system. As soon as modernity and its tensions burst into the village, Belkacem's life is turned upside down..

== Technical details ==
- Director: Mohamed Nadir Azizi
- Writer: Khaled Benmiloud
- Music: Cherif Korteby
- Cinematography: Dahou Boukerche
- Running time: 85 minutes
- Country: Algeria

== Cast ==
- Azzeddine Medjoubi as Belkacem
- Zoulikha Laouadj as Belkacem’s lover
- Himoud Brahimi as Bouacha
- Antar Hellal

== Production and context ==
Filmed in the late 1970s, the work belongs to a movement in Algerian cinema that combines social realism with mythic and symbolic elements to depict the economic and social transformations of rural communities.

== Distribution and archives ==
Film records and partial copies are listed on archive sites and cataloging platforms. References exist to archive screenings or private collections.

== See also ==
- List of Algerian films
