= Francesco Zirano =

Sardinian Roman Catholic priest

Blessed Francesco Zirano OFMConv

Martyr
- Born: 1564; Sassari, Sardinia, Kingdom of Sardinia
- Died: 25 January 1603 (aged 39); Algiers, Ottoman Algeria
- Venerated in: Roman Catholic Church
- Beatified: 12 October 2014, Piazzale Antonio Segni, Sassari, Italy by Cardinal Angelo Amato
- Feast: 29 January
- Attributes: Franciscan habit

Francesco Zirano, OFM Conv. (1565 – 25 January 1603) was a Roman Catholic priest from Sardinia and a professed member of the Order of Friars Minor Conventual. He is recognized as a martyr in the Catholic Church. Born and raised in Sardinia, he became an ordained priest in 1586. When Barbary pirates abducted and enslaved his cousin, Zirano raised funds over the course of several years to pay the ransom for his cousin's freedom. He traveled to Algiers in 1602 and helped four Christian slaves escape to freedom, but soldiers later targeted and imprisoned him. The Grand Council of Algiers sentenced him to death for his role in helping the slaves escape and for being a spy for the city's enemies, but his captors offered to spare his life if he would convert to Islam. He refused, and they executed him by flaying.

Zirano's beatification cause commenced in 1731, and Pope Francis eventually approved him for beatification in 2014. Cardinal Angelo Amato presided over his beatification in Sassari on 12 October 2014.

== Biography ==
=== Early life ===
Zirano was born in about 1564 in Sassari, in the Kingdom of Sardinia (once part of Spain and today Italy) to a family of modest farmers. Historians have not been able to discover the name of his father, who they believe died in a plague epidemic that claimed twenty thousand victims in Sassari in 1582. His mother, Margherita, lived until 1598. He most likely had two sisters and one brother. At the age of about 33, official papers described him as "a man [...] of short stature, black eyes, and brown beard." In an era where the majority of the population was illiterate, it was exceptional when he began receiving an education from the monastery of Santa Maria di Betlem at the age of 14.

In 1580, Zirano became a professed member of the Order of Friars Minor Conventual, and received his ordination to the priesthood in 1586 at the Cathedral of San Nicola from the Archbishop of Sassari Alfonso de Lorca. At the friary, he served variously as beggar, bursar, and vicar.

His younger cousin on his mother's side, Francesco Serra, also entered the priesthood. In 1590, Barbary pirates captured and enslaved Serra in one of their frequent raids on the Sardinian Coast, and transported him to Algiers. People who were abducted in one of these raids were sold as slaves in Arab lands, and sometimes allowed to communicate with relatives back home to notify them of a ransom amount that could be paid for their freedom, which price varied according to the importance of the person. Often the slaves would agree to convert to Islam in order to secure their own freedom. Zirano expressed fears that his cousin would renounce his Christian beliefs and wanted to travel to Algiers to arrange for his freedom before that could happen.

In Sardinia, the right to arrange for the ransom of captives was reserved for members of the Order of the Blessed Virgin Mary of Mercy, so in late 1597 or early 1598, Zirano presented a petition to Pope Clement VIII in late 1597 to be granted the right to raise funds to pay the 200 scudi in ransom that Serra's master demanded in exchange for his freedom. Zirano also wanted to raise funds to free other Christian slaves in the area. The Pope granted permission to accomplish these tasks beginning in March 1599 for a period of up to three years. Zirano spent the next three years travelling around Sardinia soliciting donations to pay the ransoms of kidnapped Sardinians, and meeting and consoling the families of other abducted residents.

=== Algiers ===
Zirano departed on his journey to the Barbary Coast in the spring of 1602. Because it was not possible to travel directly to Algiers from Sardinia, he first went to Spain, where King Philip III offered him passage on a ship to the region with Friar Matteo de Aguirre, who was King Philip's ambassador to the Kingdom of Kuku (today part of northern Algeria). The Kingdom of Kuku, with military support from King Phillip, was about to embark on a war with the state of Algiers. Aguirre was himself a former slave in Algiers, and his familiarity with the language, local customs, and the habits of Christian slaves and their masters in the city was expected to be an asset, but Zirano's association with Aguirre would eventually cause problems. The two left Spain and arrived in the port of Azeffoun on 28 July 1602. They traveled from the port to Kuku and Zirano later departed the city on 18 August, disguised as a travelling merchant selling linen fabrics, with a companion who could act as an interpreter. He arrived in Algiers three days later.

In Algiers, the situation was tense due to the anticipated war with the Kingdom of Kuku. Word reached the city that a large number of Spanish warships had been spotted near the island of Ibiza east of Spain. When Algerian authorities arrested a smuggler from Kuku within the city, they discovered letters written by Matteo de Aguirre, addressed to Zirano as well as to other Christians in Algiers. Zirano was added to a list of people who were searched for to be captured in the city, but he remained safely on the outskirts of the city. He helped four Christian slaves escape from their masters, and returned to Kuku with them in September. He remained in Kuku for the rest of the year, providing spiritual guidance and comfort to freed and escaped captives from Algiers.

On 1 January 1603, the conflict between the Algerian army and the Kingdom of Kuku, up until now limited to brief skirmishes, escalated, and a surprise attack by Kuku resulted in a decisive defeat to the army of Algiers. The King of Kuku, sid Amar ben Amar, wanting to communicate his success to King Philip III of Spain, instructed Zirano to personally carry a letter back to Spain. However, on the way to the port city of Azeffoun, the soldiers who were escorting him through the mountains deserted him, possibly as part of a plot to betray him to Algerian soldiers. He was captured, stripped, beaten, and chained, and led to Algiers, where he arrived on 6 January 1603. His captors locked him away in the palace of the Pasha, or governor. They mistakenly believed that he was Friar Matteo de Aguirre, and he was held for a ransom of three thousand gold ducats, about seventeen times the normal price for a slave. Under penalty of death, nobody was permitted to speak with Zirano. Despite the high security, his enslaved cousin managed to visit him two Fridays in a row, while his jailers were praying in the mosque. He told Zirano that he should prepare to die, because he had heard that his captors intended to have him burned alive.

On 22 January 1603, an English ship was about to depart for Constantinople, the capital city of the Ottoman Empire that ruled over Algiers. The Turkish soldiers that guarded the city, the Janissaries, wanted to send Zirano on that ship to the Grand Vizier of the empire since they believed him to be a valuable captive, to send a strong message that the city had not fallen to the Kingdom of Kuku and was still loyal to the Empire. However, the Pasha refused, hoping to receive the ransom for Zirano himself. After several days of disagreement, the Janissaries and the Pasha agreed to have the Grand Council of the city decide Zirano's fate. The Grand Council met on Friday, 24 January, with the soldiers advocating for the execution of Zirano, and the Pasha arguing to keep him alive in the hopes of receiving the ransom. The council failed to resolve the dispute that day, but the next morning, the Pasha changed his mind and agreed that Zirano should be executed. This change of heart was probably because Zirano's true identity had been discovered by the Council; he was not Friar Matteo de Aguirre, and was unlikely to receive such a high ransom. For his crime of helping four Christian slaves escape to Kuku and for being a spy, Zirano was sentenced to death by flaying.

=== Death ===
After being informed of the sentence, Zirano's captors offered him freedom if he converted to Islam, which he refused. They stripped him of his clothes and dressed him in a simple tunic with a chain around his neck, and paraded him down the main street of Algiers, where local residents insulted, beat, and spat upon him until he arrived at the place of execution outside the walls of the city. The executioners tied his hands to two poles driven into the ground. They told him once again that he would be spared if he would convert to Islam, and again he refused. They flayed him alive, and took his skin, removed from his body, and stuffed it with straw and publicly displayed it outside one of the gates to the city. Zirano's cousin, with the help of two Christian slaves, collected his remains and buried them in the Christian cemetery, outside the walls of the city. His cousin eventually earned his freedom and he returned to Sardinia some time prior to 1605.

== Beatification ==
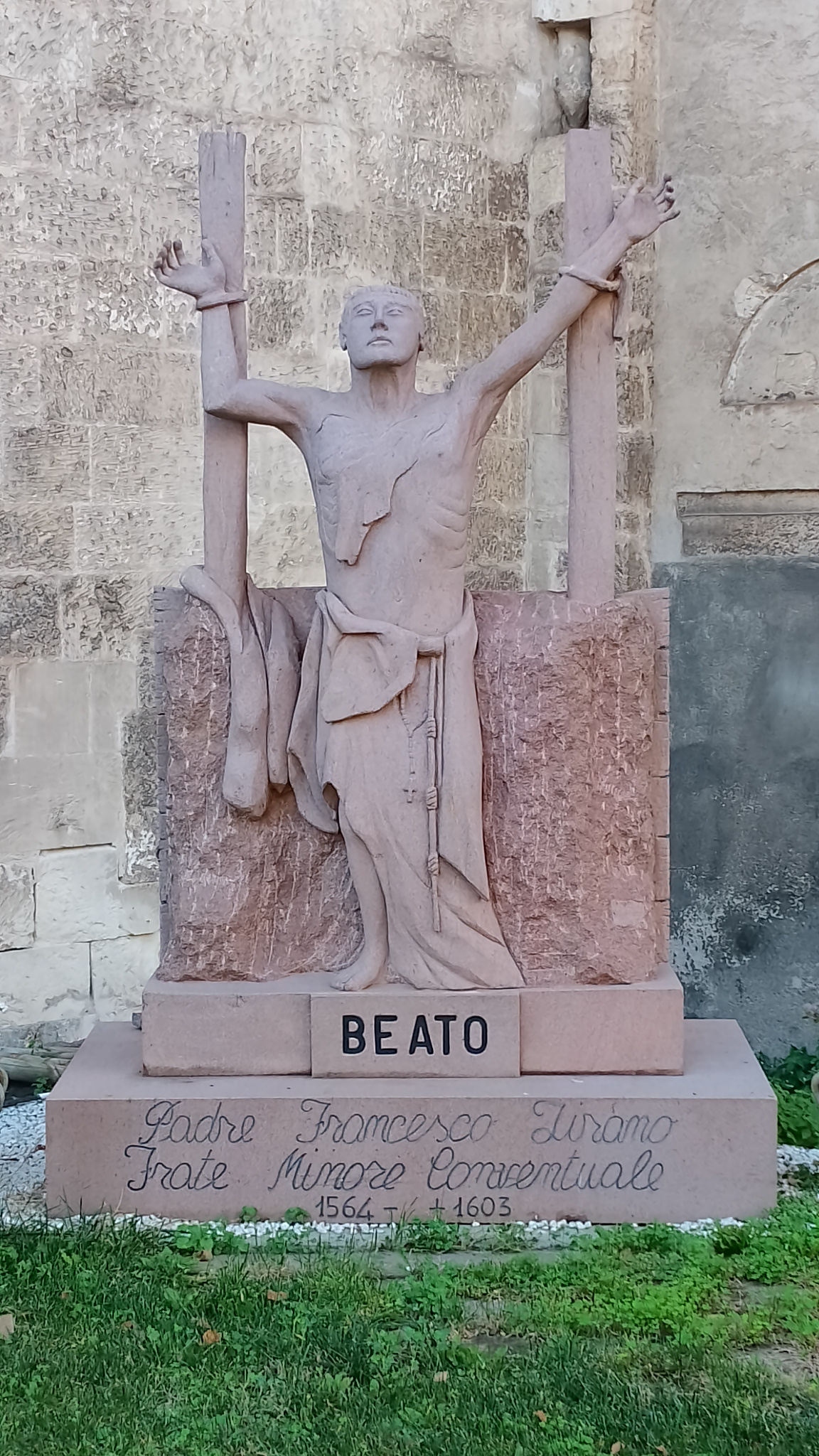
Statue of Blessed Francesco Zirano at the courtyard of Santa Maria di Betlem church in Sassari

The first stated intent to propose church recognition of Zirano as a martyr was in 1606, when the depositions of two eyewitnesses of Zirano's death were published. The first serious steps toward beatification did not occur until 1731, when a request to the Congregation for Rites to begin the sainthood process was denied after a dispute between the Conventual Franciscans and the Order of Friars Minor who each claimed Zirano as their own member, thus throwing into question who the formal petitioner should be.

In 1926, the postulator general, Giuseppe Vicari, requested all of the available information about Zirano from the provincial minister of Sardinia. After World War II, a new postulator, Antonio Ricciardi, attempted to advance the process, but was instructed to seek further documents. Starting In 1977, Sardinian historian Umberto Zucca spent six years researching Italian and Spanish archives to compile the completed set of documents required to advance the process of Beatification, and on 18 May 1984 the Congregation for the Causes of Saints decided that the cause can proceed. On 25 November 1984, the Archbishop of Sassari, Salvatore Isgrò, created a commission for the examination of the collected documentation, a process that continued until 15 August 1990, when the late priest became titled as a Servant of God. The postulation submitted the Positio to the C.C.S. for assessment in 2001. Historians assented to the cause on 4 March 2003 while theologians on 16 May 2013 endorsed the cause as did the members of the C.C.S. on 4 February 2014. On 7 February 2014, Pope Francis approved the petition that the late priest had been killed in odium fidei ("in hatred of the faith") and Zirano was then approved to be beatified. Cardinal Angelo Amato presided over the beatification on the pope's behalf in Sassari on 12 October 2014. In attendance was the Sassari Archbishop Paolo Maria Virgilio Atzei and the then-Archbishop of Algiers Ghaleb Moussa Abdalla Bader. The postulator for this cause is the Conventual Franciscan priest Angelo Paleri.
