= Cherif Korteby =

Chérif Korteby أحمد شريف قرطبي
- Born: Ahmed Chérif Kortbi; 25 February 1935; Berrouaghia, Médéa Province, Algeria
- Origin: Algeria
- Died: 21 May 2010 (aged 75) Marseille, France
- Genres: Algerian music, patriotic music, film music
- Occupations: Composer, conductor, musician
- Instruments: Orchestral conducting, composition
- Years active: 1950s–2010
- Formerly of: Algerian Radio Orchestra

Chérif Kortbi, sometimes spelled Chérif Korteby, born on 25 February 1935 in Berrouaghia (Médéa Province) and died on 21 May 2010 in Marseille, was an Algerian composer, conductor and musician, renowned for his patriotic works and film scores.

== Biography ==
Born in 1937 in the Medea region and joined the National Radio before independence, first as a musician and then as a composer. Chérif Kortbi trained at local music institutions after 1954 and joined Algerian National Radio shortly after independence Upon his death, the Algerian press highlighted his long career in the service of national music and his collaborations with numerous artists.

== Filmography ==
Sources:

- 1975 : Le Vent du sud — music / musical contribution
- 1978 : L'olivier de Boulhilet — credited as musician
- 1979 : Le Retour — credited as guitarist
- 1980 : Kahla Oua Beida — credited as sound engineer
- 1983 : L'Épopée de Cheïkh Bouamama — credited as composer

== Discography ==
=== Titles ===
- Dalal Chemali — song Les yeux migrateurs — composition
- Mahdia — titles Tayr El Hamam and Ala Kaf El Hawa — composition
- Compilation Chants patriotiques d'Algérie — includes several titles composed by Chérif Kortbi

== Recognition ==
- The newspaper L’Expression published an article titled Un bel hommage au maestro, highlighting his human and artistic qualities.
- Upon his death in May 2010, Horizons recalled that he composed the widely broadcast anthem Min Adjlika ya Watan.
- Le Midi emphasized his contribution to the National Radio and his long musical career.

== See also ==
- algerian television
- Kahla Oua Beida
- L'olivier de Boulhilet
- Le Vent du sud
- Radio Algeria
