= Himoud Brahimi =

Algerian actor, playwright and philosopher

Mohamed Brahimi
- Born: 1918; Casbah of Algiers, Algeria
- Died: 30 June 1997 (aged 78–79); Algiers, Algeria
- Other names: Momo La Casbah, Himoud
- Occupations: Actor, writer, playwright, diver

Mohamed Brahimi, known as Himoud Brahimi (or Momo), was an Algerian actor, playwright, diver, philosopher, and writer, recognized for his contributions to cinema and Algerian literature. His work is marked by a strong attachment to the popular culture of the Casbah of Algiers and also for his world record in freediving in the Paris swimming pool in 1956.

== Biography ==
=== Early life ===
Himoud Brahimi was born on 18 March 1918 in the Casbah of Algiers, His childhood in the Casbah influenced his artistic vision. The realities of daily life in the neighborhood, its stories, and its spiritual atmosphere shaped the themes of his works.

=== Film career ===
Himoud Brahimi became known in Algerian cinema at a time when national cinema sought to depict the social reality of colonial life in several films. He adopted a unique style, blending humor and subtle critique. He was quickly noticed by Tahar Hanache, who gave him a significant role in his films, notably in Les Plongeurs du désert in 1953. After independence, Momo spent almost a decade away from cinema, but his major return in the film Tahia ya Didou by Zinet, in which he co-wrote the screenplay, immediately secured his place in Algerian cinema.

He died in Algiers on 30 June 1997.

== Filmography ==
Source: Here is a list of Himoud Brahimi's films.

- 1949: Les Noces de sable by André Zwobada: The Jester.
- 1952: Au coeur de la Casbah by Pierre Cardinal.
- 1952: Les Plongeurs du désert by Tahar Hannache: Ammi Hassen.
- 1971: Alger Insolite (Tahia Ya Didou) by Mohamed Zinet: Momo, the poet.
- 1978: L'olivier de Boulhilet by Mohamed Nadir Azizi: Bouacha, the madman.
- 1981: El Anka by Abdelkrim Baba Aissa: Himoud Brahimi.
- 1982: Vent de sable by Mohammed Lakhdar-Hamina: The blind man.
- 1987: Cri de pierre by Abderrahmane Bouguermouh: Salah.
- 1989: Le Clandestin (film, 1989) by Benamar Bakhti: Ammi Hassen.
- 1991: Ombres Blanches by Saïd Ould Khelifa.

== Bibliography ==
In addition to his film career, Himoud Brahimi was a prolific author. His bibliography includes essays, stories, and poetic works exploring social, philosophical, and linguistic themes.

== Works ==
=== Novels, poetry, and other publications ===
- Les mots, le verbe et la parole, essay, Algiers, El Ibriz editions, 2016, 127 p..
- Casbah Lumiere, essay, Paris, Joëlle Losfeld, 1993, 120 p..
- L'identité supreme, essay, Algiers, Baconnier, 1953, 69 p..
- Qui suis-je ? Amour de lumière, short stories, Algiers, Editions Rafar, 2014, 218 p..
- La Magie des Mots, texts and poems, Algiers, Alpha, 2006, 235 p..
- Ode à la Terre, poem, Echo-soir, 20 August 1955.
- Le Hachisch et la Cascade, tale, Ici Alger, no. 54, March–April 1957.
- L'homme et l'univers, Ici Alger, no. 87, May 1960.
- Vision ailée, Algérie-Actualité, no. 120, 4 February 1968 (reprinted from Ici Alger, May 1960).
- O Femmes Nouvelles, Femmes nouvelles, no. 51, October 1960.
- Pourquoi l'Arabe ?, Algérie-Actualité, no. 78, 16 April 1967.
- Le 13e ébouillanté, Algérie-Actualité, no. 97, 27 August 1967.
- L'appât du lucre, tale, Algérie-Actualité, no. 101, 24 September 1967.
- La partie de domino, tale, Algérie-Actualité, no. 104, 15 October 1967.
- Le Spectacle créateur, Algérie-Actualité, no. 105, 22 October 1967.
- Souvenir, Algérie-Actualité, no. 107, 5 November 1967.
- Le guerrier endormi, Algérie-Actualité, no. 108, 12 November 1967.
- La terre, Algérie-Actualité, no. 109, 19 November 1967.
- Chabab el youm, Algérie-Actualité, no. 111, 3 December 1967.
- L'aveugle aux doigts d'orphée, Algérie-Actualité, no. 112, 10 December 1967.
- Le joueur de flûte, tale, Algérie-Actualité, no. 114, 24 December 1967.
- L'amour des poissons, Algérie-Actualité, no. 128, 31 March 1968.

=== Works about Brahimi ===
- Le fou de la Casbah, Jean-René Huleu, biography, Paris, Editions Chemins de Traverse, 2012, 235 p..
- MOMO Le Poète Béni, Amar Belkhoudja, poetry, Algiers, El Ibriz editions, 2013, 142 p..
- Tahia ya Momo, Çaliha Brahimi and Djamel Azzi, biography, self-published, 2006, 80 p.

== Tribute and legacy ==
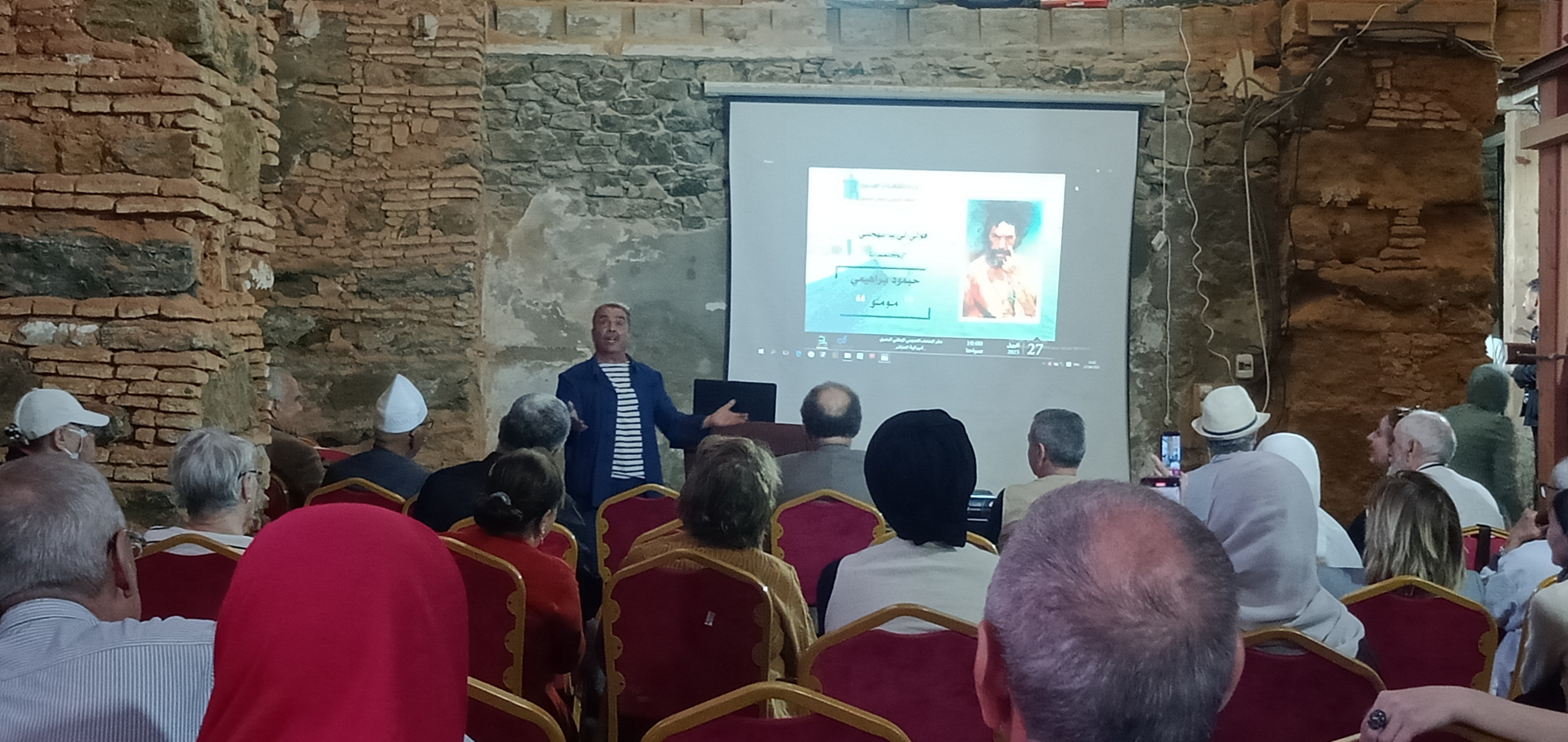
Abdelhamid Rabia speaking during the tribute

A tribute to Himoud Brahimi took place on 27 April 2023 at the National Public Maritime Museum of Algiers, bringing together relatives, artists, and admirers of his work. This event celebrated the importance of his legacy, which continues to influence new generations of Algerian artists.

== See also ==
- Algerian cinema
- Algerian culture
- Algerian literature
