= Areski Nebti =

Algerian actor (1926–1994)

- Born: 5 May 1926; Belcourt, Algiers
- Died: 28 April 1994 (aged 67); Algiers
- Other name: Areski / Arezki Nabti
- Citizenship: Algerian
- Occupations: Actor; Assistant director
- Notable work: Chronique des années de braise Omar Gatlato; Bab el-Oued City; Le Vent du sud De Hollywood à Tamanrasset

Areski Nebti (often spelled Arezki Nabti) was born on 5 May 1926 in Belcourt (Algiers) and died on 28 April 1994. He participated in Algerian productions such as Chronique des années de braise and Omar Gatlato.

== Biography ==
Areski Nebti was born on 5 May 1926 in the district of Belcourt, Algiers. He died on 28 April 1994.

== Career ==
Areski Nebti worked both as a character actor and as an assistant director. He appeared in several Algerian and international co-productions, collaborating with major Algerian filmmakers such as Mohammed Lakhdar-Hamina and Merzak Allouache. Sources also credit him as a second assistant director on certain productions.

== Selected filmography ==
- 1968: La Voie — credited in some listings
- 1972: Sanaoud — unspecified role
- 1974: Zone interdite — Monsieur Vachonne
- 1975: Le Vent du sud — actor / assistant director
- 1975: Chronique des années de braise — second assistant director
- 1976: Omar Gatlato — the uncle
- 1979: Le Retour — actor
- 1983: Les Folles Années du twist — Kaddour
- 1986: Sombrero — le chauffeur du bandit
- 1990: De Hollywood à Tamanrasset — Kojak
- 1992: Deux Femmes — actor and assistant director
- 1994: Bab El-Oued City — Hassan the baker
