= Aït Yahia =

Aït Yahia Arabic: آيت يحيى Berber: ⴰⵜ ⵢⴰⵃⵢⴰ
- Commune
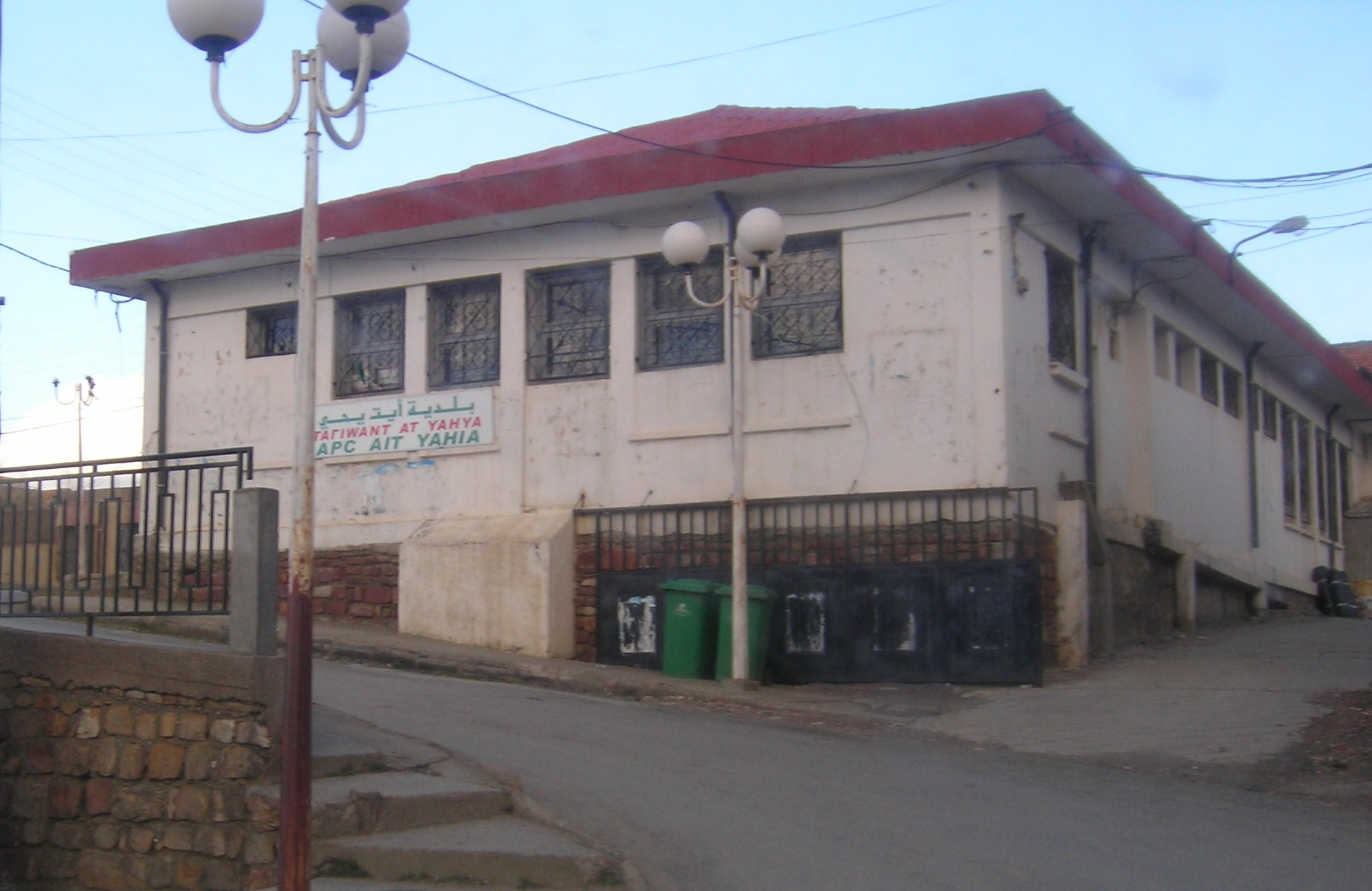
- City Hall

- Location of Aït Yahia within Tizi-Ouzou wilaya

- Location of Aït Yahia within Algeria
- Coordinates: 36°34′52″N 4°19′49″E
- Country: Algeria
- Region: Kabylie
- Wilaya: Tizi Ouzou
- Daïra: Aïn El Hammam
- Administrative Center: Ait Hichem^{fr}

Area
  - Total: 20.246 sq mi (52.437 km^{2})

Population (2008)
  - Total: 14,439
  - Density: 710/sq mi (275/km^{2})
- Time zone: UTC+1 (CET)

Aït Yahia is a commune in the Tizi Ouzou wilaya in northern Algeria, located 47 km to the southeast of Tizi Ouzou, 33 km to the south of Azazga, and 4 km northeast of Aïn El Hammam. The administrative center of the commune is the village of Ait Hichem ^{[fr]}.

== Geography ==
=== Location ===
The commune is crossed by Route Nationale 71, which connects Azazga and Aïn El Hammam; by W150, which connects RN 12 and RN 71 from Chayeb to Aït Hichem, passing through Mekla; and by W10 from Souamâa to Bousehel.
The commune of Aït Yahia is located in the Southeast of the Tizi Ouzou wilaya. The commune's territory is bordered by:

- the communes of Mekla, Aït Khellili, Souamâa, and Ifigha to the north;
- the communes of Illoula Oumalou and Imsouhel to the east;
- the communes of Iferhounène and Abi Youcef to the south; and
- the communes of Aïn El Hammam and Aït Aggouacha to the west.

=== Localities in the Commune ===
Following the administrative division of 1984, the commune of Aït Yahia comprises the following localities:

- Aït Hichem
- Aït Mellal
- Tagounits
- Tafraout
- Koukou
- Taka Igoufaf
- Takana
- Issendlène
- Aït Anteur
- Aït Djebara
- Aït Bouchtchour
- Aït Mendil
- Agouni Issad
- Aït Ahmed
- Aït Si Amara
- Tala Bouafir
- Aït Cherif
- Aït Hamadouche
- Aït Hela
- Aït Daoud
- Aït Boufarès
- Aït El Hadj
- Ihamachène
- Igouras
- Aït Ziri
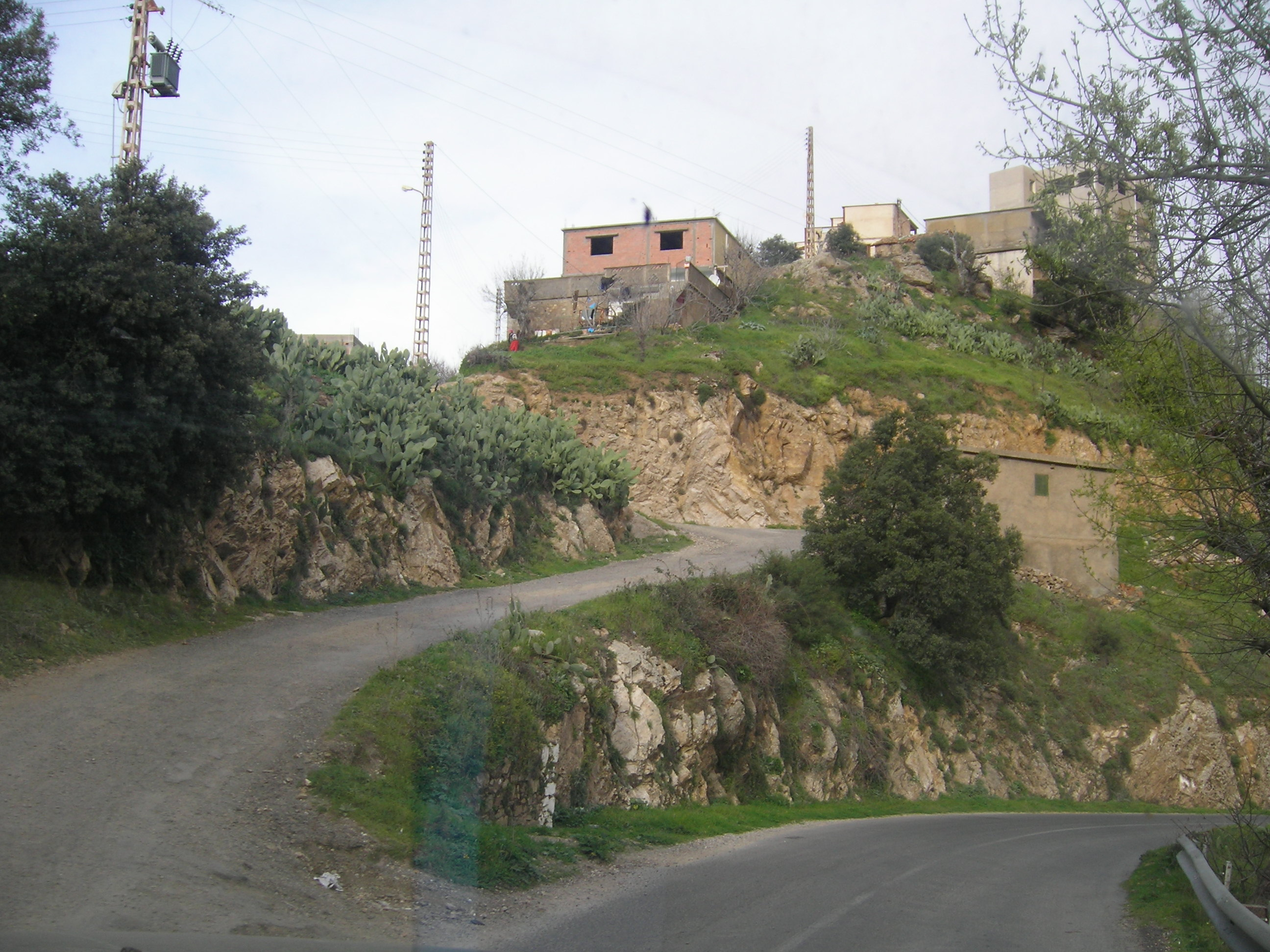
Main entrance to the village of Tafraout on RN 71

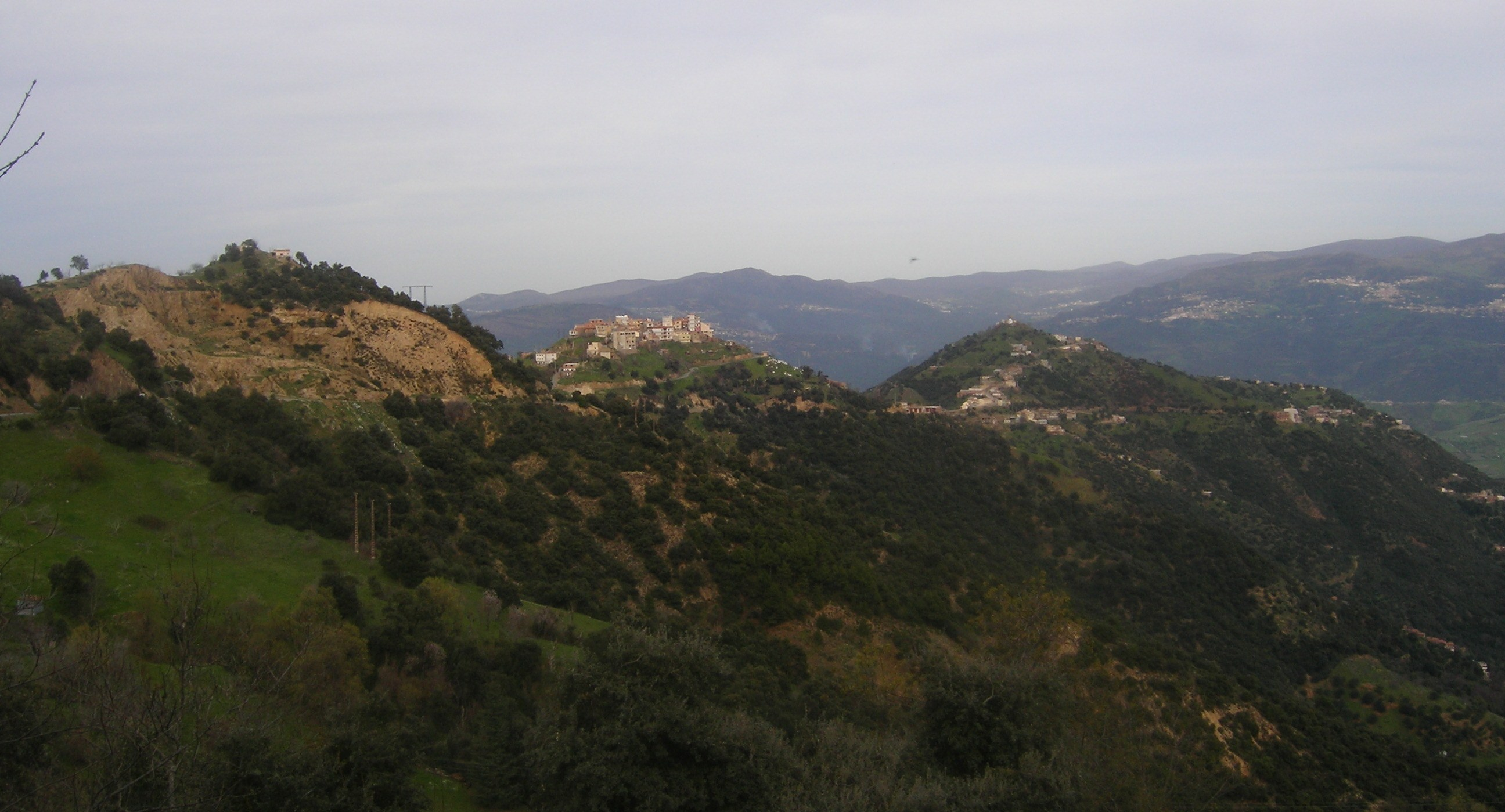
Villages of Tafraout and Koukou

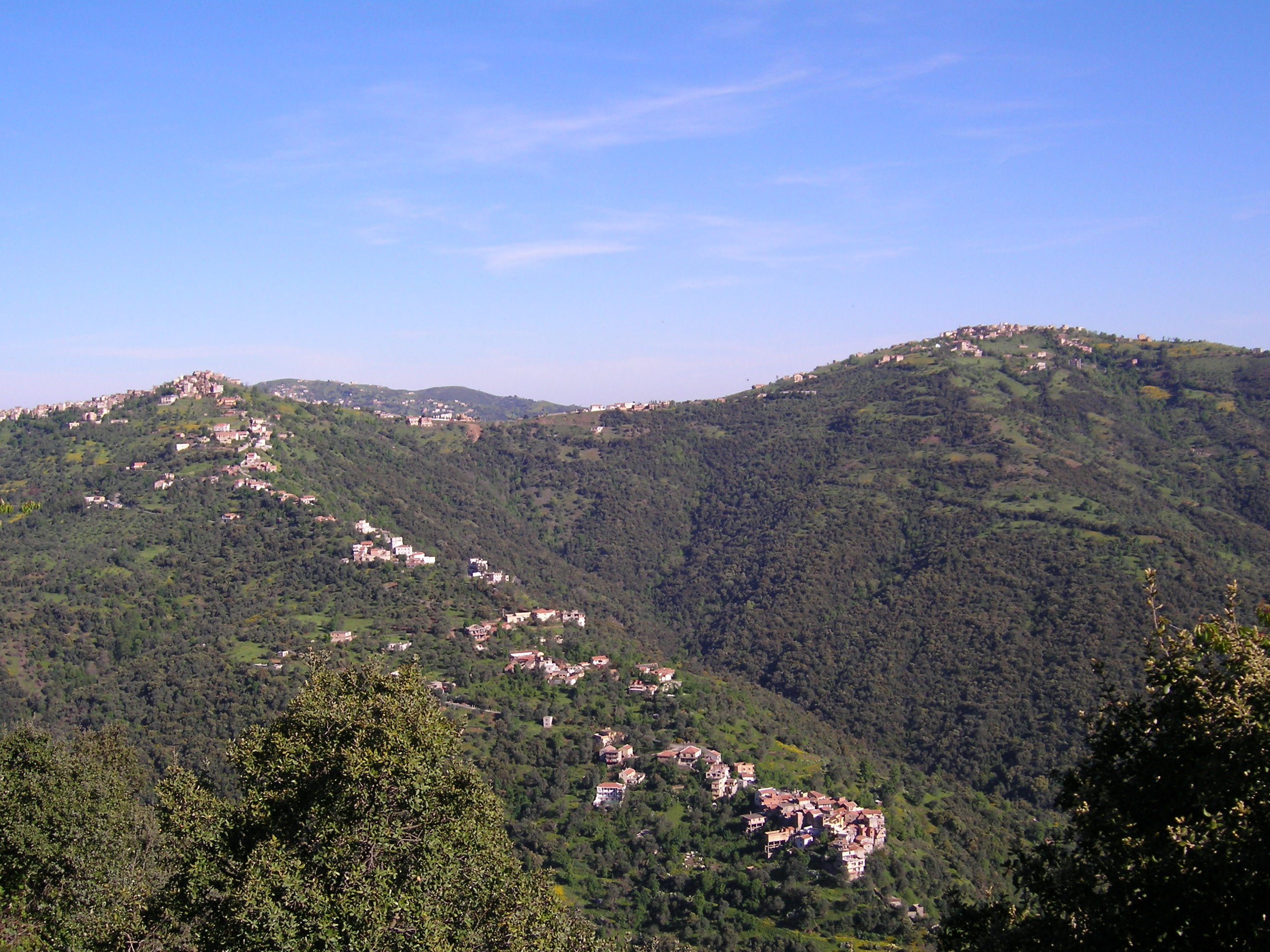
Villages of Taka (left) and Igoufaf (right), as seen from Koukou

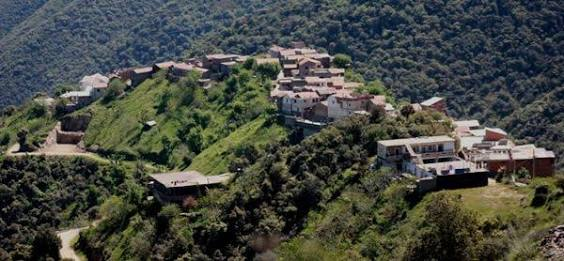
Issendlène village

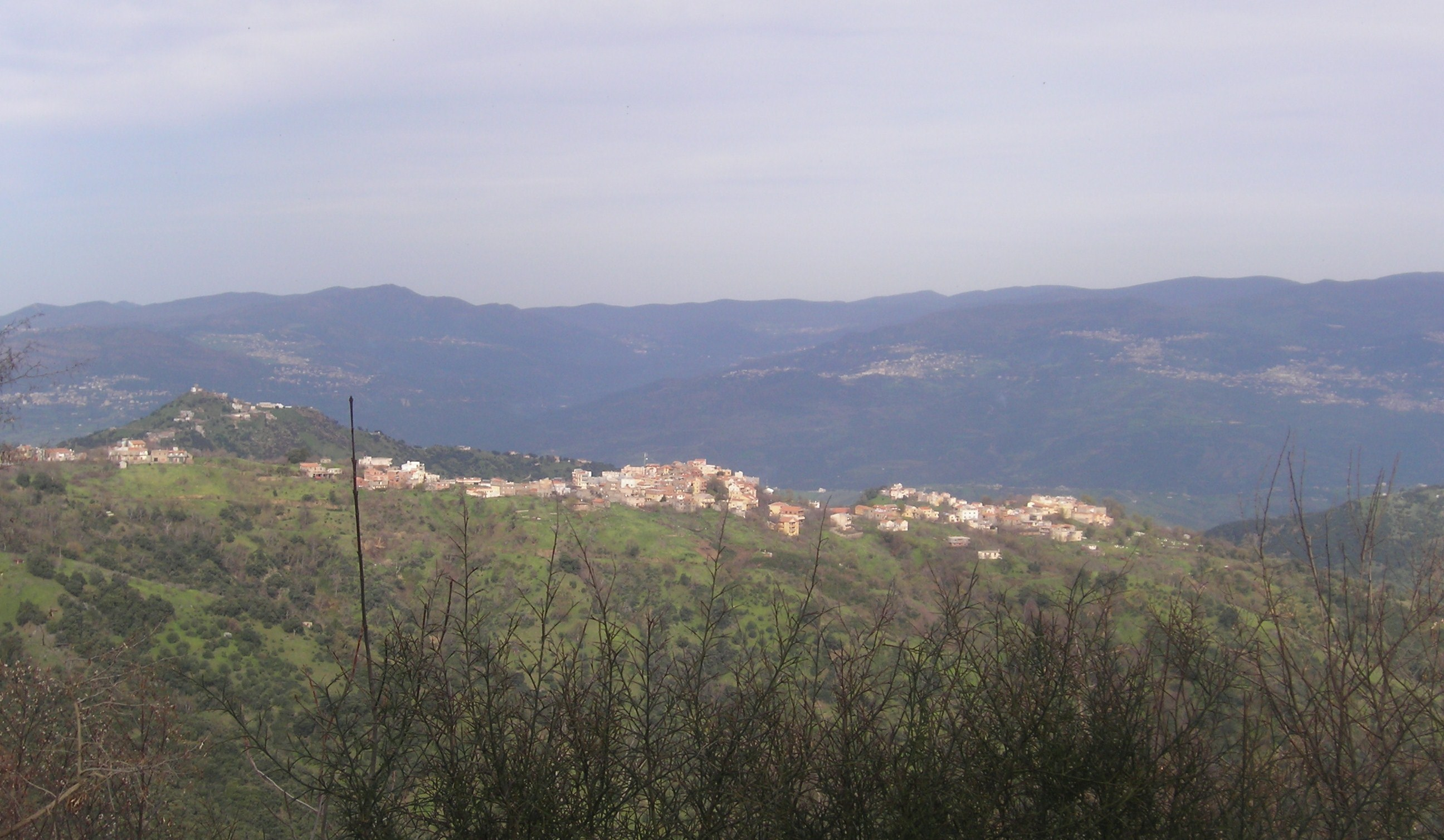
View of the villages Aït Mendil, Aït Ziri, and Aït Anteur

== History ==
The Aït Yahia group (or Âarch ^{[fr]}) was part of the mixed commune (commune mixte ^{[fr]}) of Djurdjura then Michelet until that commune's dissolution in 1956 then the commune of Taka until 1984 (with the decree of February 4, 1984, regarding the new administrative structuring) when this Âarch became a commune in its own right.

== Economy ==
Ighil n'Ssebt in Aït Hichem is home to artisanal center of the commune with private workshops, dedicated to the weaving for which the region is known, as well as a textile factory.

== Politics and Administration ==
=== Seat of the People's Municipal Assembly ===
The seat of the People's Municipal Assembly (French: Assemblée Populaire Communale or APC) is located in the Ighil n'Ssebt area, erstwhile location of a weekly market by that name, at the southern end of Aït Hichem, on the premises of a former workroom once run by the White Sisters. New premises intended to house the elected assembly's administrative center are in the process of being constructed in the Taqaâett Idebbalen area at the other end of Aït Hichem.

=== The People's Municipal Assembly ===
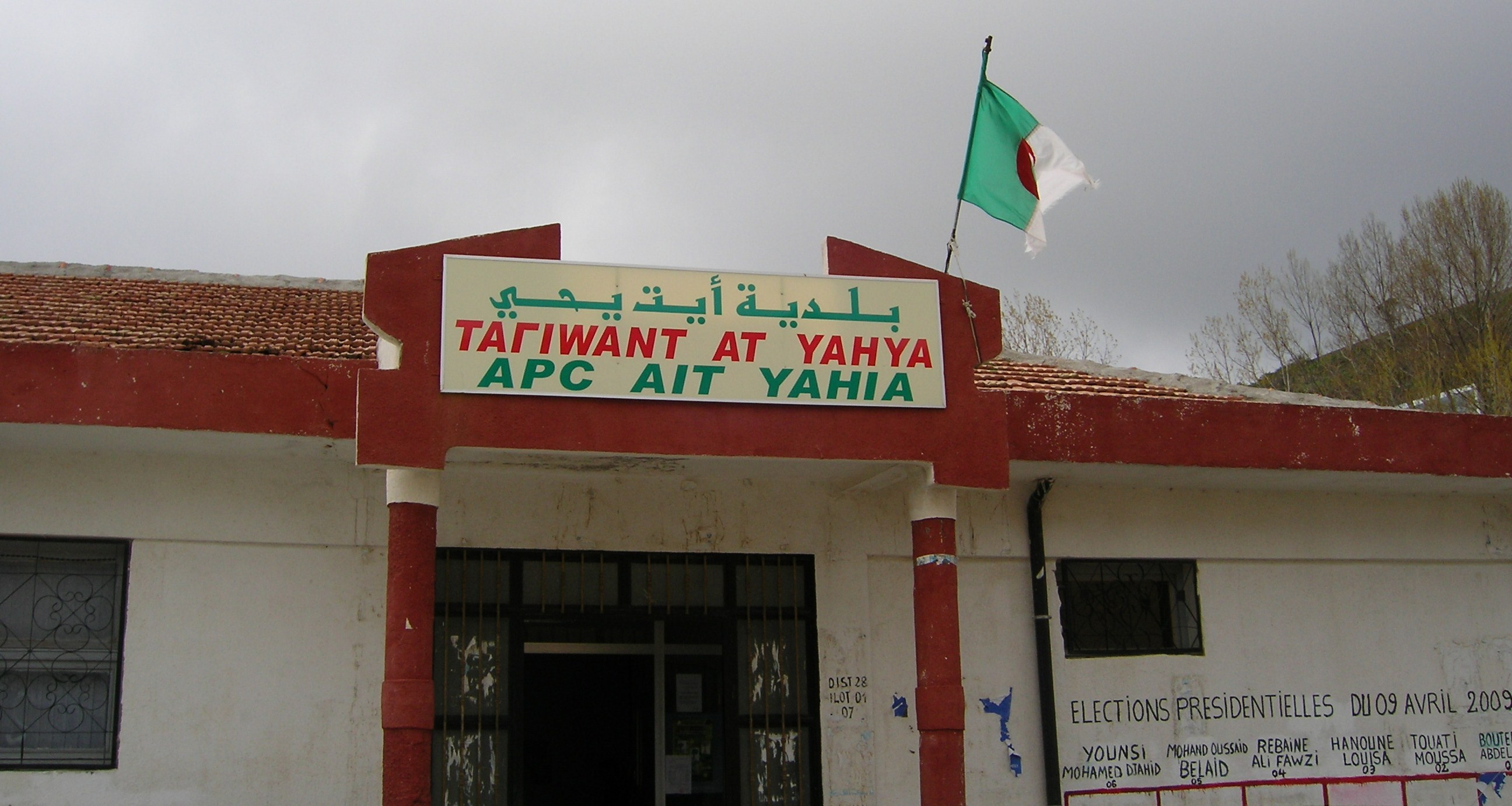
Seat of the PMA of Aït Yahia

Aït Yahia's first elected People's Municipal Assembly was presided by Hocine Ben Younes from the village of Aït Ziri. Hocine Ben Younes died during his term, and was replaced by his first vice president, Mohamed Ait Tayeb from the village of Igouras, who served until the end of the term in 1989.

Since the arrival of the multiparty system in Algeria in 1989, it has been the FFS (Socialist Forces Front) and the RCD (Rally for Culture and Democracy), two parties with a stronghold in the Kabylie region, who have succeeded to the presidency of the municipal assembly.

The RCD won the 1989 elections. Boussaâd Ait Oufella, from the village of Tagounits, was elected president of the municipal assembly.

In 1994, the RCD and the FFS boycotted the elections. The State, to fill the vacancy, appointed a municipal executive delegation. Djillali Ben Gougam, from the village of Aït Ziri, was appointed as the head of this delegation.

In 1997, the FFS won the elections with a relative majority. Mourad Ait Hamadouche, from the village of Taka, was elected president of the PMA. He stepped down in 2000, before the end of his term. His first deputy, Mohand Ben Slimane, from the village of Koukou, succeeded him until the end of the term.

In 2002, Mohand Ben Slimane, then member of the FFS, was reelected to the head of the PMA. But when the FFS decided to step back from municipal leadership, Mohand Ben Slimane withdrew from the FFS and thus remained at his post of president (as an independent) until the end of his term.

In the municipal election of 2007, the commune's presidency went to Tahar Ben Slimane of the RCD, which obtained a majority of seats. The eleven seats of the assembly were shared between three parties: RCD, FFS, and FLN.

In 2012, an agreement was sealed by the elected officials by constituting a majority in order to manage the commune's affairs and the FLN runs the commune.

=== Schools ===
The large villages each have a primary school: Aït Hichem, Aït Ziri, Tafraout, Issendlène, Koukou, Tagounits, Takanna, Taka, Igoufaf, and Aït Si Amara. There are primary schools in Taguemount and Tukac, but they are closed for lack of schoolchildren; in Tukac a small, pre-fab school was built but it only served a few years before being abandoned. There is also a new primary school in Igoufaf named Chahid Djoudrez Hocine, established in 2000 between the six villages which border Igoufaf: Aït Hela, Aït Cherif, Aït Boufarès, Aït Daoud, Targoust, and Ihemachène.

Additionally, there are three middle schools:

- in Aït Hichem, since 1979
- in Taka, since 1989
- in Tagounits, opened in 2002;

A high school in Taqaâett Idebbalen in Aït Hichem opened in 2010.

=== Medical facilities ===
There are four medical units for first aid:

- a free clinic in Aït Hichem;
- a unit in Koukou;
- a unit in Tagounits; and
- a unit in Taka.

=== Post Offices ===
The commune contains three post offices: Aït Hichem (Ssebt), Koukou (Marguen), and Taka (Tizi).

== Daily Life ==
=== Sports ===
The multipurpose sports hall in Aït Hichem was demolished and the area allocated to other projects, in particular one project to house the "new city" of Aït Yahia. The village of Taka has a soccer stadium.

=== Culture ===
The commune has two youth centers in the villages of Taka and Aït Ziri, as well as two equipped playgrounds in Tagounits and Taka.

== Notable people ==
- Literature and Poetry:
  - Cheikh Mohand Ou Lhocine^{[fr]}
  - Rachid Bellil^{[fr]}
- Sports:
  - Loucif Hamani
  - Kamel Abdesselam^{[fr]}, player for JS Kabylie (1978-1993)
- Politicians:
  - Hocine Aït Ahmed
  - Mokrane Ait Larbi^{[fr]} and his brother Arezki Ait Larbi^{[fr]}
  - Ali Yahia Abdennour^{[fr]}
  - Rachid Ali Yahia^{[fr]}
