= Arezki Aït-Larbi =

Algerian journalist (born 1955)

Arezki Aït-Larbi (Kabyle: Aṛezqi At Lɛrbi, born August 11, 1955, in Aït Si Amara in the commune of Aït Yahia (in Kabylia, Algeria)), is an Algerian journalist and human rights activist.

== Biography ==
Berber Spring activist, he was arrested on April 20, 1980, and brought before the State Security Court with 23 other people. All were released, without trial, on bail on June 26, 1980.

On May 19, 1981, he was arrested again at the University of Algiers along with many other members of the cultural collective of the university. He had to spend eight months in the prison of El Harrach (Algiers)

In February 1989, he was one of the founders of the Rally for Culture and Democracy party. He resigned from this party in October 1991, left the activist scene, and began a career as a journalist. During the years of terrorism, he was a columnist for L'Hebdo Libéré, then a reporter for Ruptures. He was also writing for the French daily Le Figaro. After the assassination of the writer Tahar Djaout in May 1993, he created, with a group of artists and intellectuals, the "Truth Committee", which casts doubts on the official thesis attributing the attack to the GIA.

Correspondent for several foreign publications, notably Le Figaro, Ouest-France, La Libre Belgique, and the Los Angeles Times, the authorities have refused him official accreditation since 1995, as well as obtaining an authorization for the creation of a newspaper since 2005.

From 1998 to 2000, he was a consultant for the International Crisis Group on behalf of which he participated in two studies on Algeria. Since 2008, he has been the initiator of the SOS Libertés Collective, which campaigns for the defense of individual freedoms in Algeria, and particularly of freedom of conscience and worship; especially in the defense of Christians persecuted by the regime. In 2009, he founded the Koukou publishing company, eponymous of the kingdom of Koukou and specialized in political and historical essay. He was the subject of several arrests by the Algerian authorities, notably in 2007 and 2011.
