= L'Opium et le Bâton (film) =

1971 Algerian film

- Theatrical release poster
- Directed by: Ahmed Rachedi
- Written by: Mouloud Mammeri; Ahmed Rachedi
- Starring: Marie-José Nat
- Cinematography: Rachid Merabtine
- Release date: July 1971
- Running time: 135 minutes
- Country: Algeria
- Languages: French; Arabic

L'Opium et le Bâton (transl. The Opium and the Stick) is a 1971 Algerian drama film directed by Ahmed Rachedi. It was entered into the 7th Moscow International Film Festival.

== Cast ==
- Marie-José Nat as Farroudja
- Sid Ali Kouiret as Ali
- Jean-Louis Trintignant as Chaudier
- Jean-Claude Bercq as Delécluze
- Mustapha Kateb as Bachir Lazrag
- Rouïched as Tayeb
- Djelloul Bachdjarah
- Kaci Ksentini
