= Kahla Oua Beida =

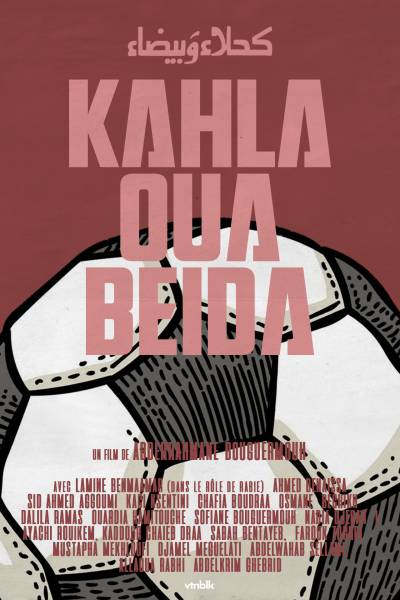
- Poster of Kahla Oua Beida
- كحلاء و بيضاء
- Directed by: Abderrahmane Bouguermouh
- Written by: Abderrahmane Bouguermouh
- Starring: El Amine Benmaamar, Ahmed Benaïssa, Sid Ahmed Agoumi, Osmane Bechikh, Chafia Boudraa
- Music by: Ahmed Malek
- Release date: 1980
- Running time: 123 minutes
- Country: Algeria
- Language: Arabic

Kahla Oua Beida (in Arabic: كحلاء و بيضاء) is an Algerian television film directed by Abderrahmane Bouguermouh, released in 1980. The film was a popular success in Algeria and remains one of the most significant works of Algerian cinema from the 1980s.

== Plot ==
Rabie, a young boy from Setif, tries by all means to raise the money needed to buy a wheelchair for his paralyzed sister, Sassia.

== Production ==
- Original title : كحلاء و بيضاء (Kahla Oua Beida / Black and White)
- Director : Abderrahmane Bouguermouh
- Writer : Abderrahmane Bouguermouh
- Sound engineer : Cherif Korteby
- Music : Ahmed Malek
- Cinematography : Mohamed Ouadah
- Country : Algeria
- Running time : 123 minutes
- Release year : 1980

== Cast ==
- El Amine Benmaamar as Rabie (main role)
- Ahmed Benaïssa
- Sid Ahmed Agoumi
- Osmane Bechikh
- Chafia Boudraa
- Kaci Ksentini

== Reception ==
The film was considered a “major popular success” and remains vivid in the collective memory of Algerian cinephiles. Several articles, blogs, and North African cinema pages highlight its cultural importance and the public's affection for its characters.

== See also ==
- Cinema of Algeria
- Abderrahmane Bouguermouh
- List of Algerian films
