= Pour que vive l'Algérie! =

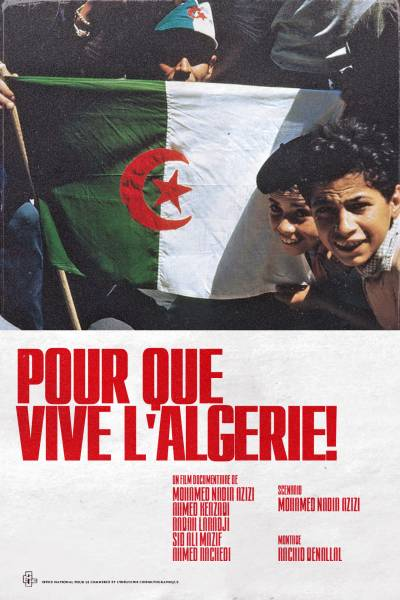
- Poster of the film Pour que vive l'Algérie!
- Pour que vive l'Algérie !
- Directed by: Mohamed Nadir Azizi; Sid Ali Mazif; Rabah Laradji; Ahmed Rachedi; Ahmed Kerzabi (collective film)
- Written by: Mohamed Nadir Azizi
- Produced by: ONCIC
- Release date: 1972
- Running time: 95 minutes
- Country: Algeria
- Language: French / Arabic

Pour que vive l'Algérie! is a collective documentary film produced in 1972 by ONCIC. The film is divided into four segments, each directed by a different filmmaker, which shed light on the transformations of post-independence Algeria. The team consisted of: Mohamed Nadir Azizi, Sid Ali Mazif, Rabah Laradji, Ahmed Rachedi, and Ahmed Kerzabi.

== Synopsis ==
The documentary, presented through this four-part series, showcases the institutional projects, rural reform, and social achievements of independent Algeria in the early 1970s..

== Technical details ==
- Original title: Pour que vive l'Algérie!
- Directors: Mohamed Nadir Azizi; Sid Ali Mazif; Rabah Laradji; Ahmed Rachedi; Ahmed Kerzabi (collective work)
- Screenplay: Mohamed Nadir Azizi
- Producer: ONCIC
- Country: Algeria
- Year: 1972
- Runtime: 95 minutes (some sources indicate 90–95 min)
- Format: 35 mm

== Cast ==
As a collective documentary, the film does not emphasize individual cast members. film databases lists only the directors and the producing institution (ONCIC).

== Production and context ==
The film was produced by ONCIC as part of a project to document and promote the government's initiatives and policies following Algeria's independence. Several filmmakers collaborated on this work.

== See also ==
=== Related articles ===
- Algerian cinema
- ONCIC
- List of Algerian films
