= Rachid Benallal =

Algerian filmmaker (born 1946)

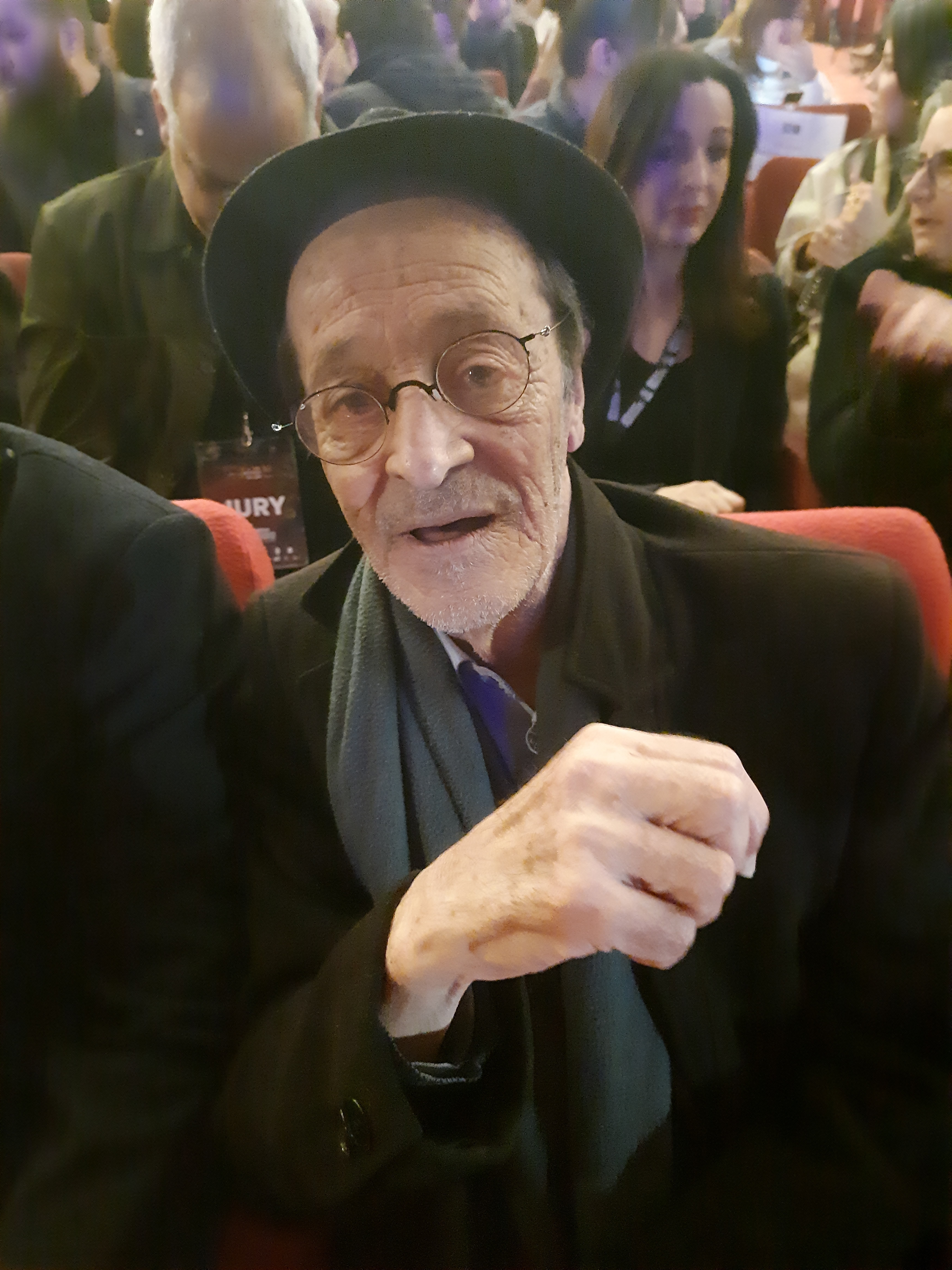
- Born: Rachid Benallal رشيد بن علال; 1946 (age 79–80); Algiers, Algeria
- Citizenship: Algerian
- Occupations: Director, screenwriter, editor, actor
- Notable work: Yaouled (1993); Si Mohand u M'Hand, the Rebel (2008); The Treasures of the Atlas (1997) (see filmography)

Rachid Benallal (in Arabic: رشيد بن علال) (sometimes spelled Rachid Benallel) is a film director, screenwriter, editor, and actor. Born in 1946 in Algiers, he has been active since the late 1960s and notably directed the feature films Yaouled (1993) and Si Mohand u M'Hand, le Rebelle (2008).

== Career ==
Rachid Benallal worked as an editor on Algerian productions in the 1970s and 1980s, as a director of short and feature films, and as a creator of fiction and documentary films. He directed Yaouled (1993) and co-directed (with Lyazid Khodja) Si Mohand u M'Hand, the Rebel (2008).

He also worked as an editor on many productions and participated in Maghreb co-productions.

== Style and themes ==
Benallal's films often explore social stories and marginalized characters (for example, Yaouled, which follows a street adolescent). His co-direction on Si Mohand u M'Hand reflects his interest in portraying Algerian cultural figures (in this case the poet Si Mohand U M'hand).

== Filmography ==
Year	Title	Role / Notes
1979	Un toit, une famille	Editor (credited)
1993	Yaouled	Director — feature film focusing on childhood and street life in Algeria,
1997	The Treasures of the Atlas	Director / credits listed in Algerian film databases
1998	Destin de femme	Credited (Africiné database)
2002	Pote (Le) / Weld derb	Credited
2008	Si Mohand u M'Hand, the Rebel	Director (co-director) — portrait of the poet Si Mohand U M'hand,
2014	Passage à niveau	Actor (credited, short film by Anis Djaad)
2016	Reveries of the Solitary Actor	Appearance / technical credit (IMDb)
2024	Les Tempêtes	Credited (AlloCiné recent films list)

== Awards and festivals ==
- Best Director Award – Maghreb Short Film Festival, Oujda (Morocco) for Passage à niveau
- Best Actor Award – Maghreb Short Film Festival, Oujda (Morocco) for Passage à niveau
- Editing Award – Marrakech, 2001
- Best Advertising Spot – Tébessa, 1993
- Lifetime Achievement Tribute – Annaba Mediterranean Film Festival

== See also ==
- Si Mohand Ou Mhand
- List of Algerian films
