= Sid Ali Kouiret =

Algerian actor

- Born: 3 January 1933; Algiers
- Died: 5 April 2015 (aged 82)
- Occupation: Actor
- Notable work: L'Opium et le Bâton

Sid Ali Kouiret (3 January 1933 – 5 April 2015) was an Algerian actor.

== Biography ==
Kouiret was born at Algiers. He was a theater and cinema comedian. His father, a taxi driver, was an alcoholic and was violent with Kouiret's mother. One day, Kouiret, stabbed his father, at the back. Which had obliged him to live on the streets at a young age.

At 17, he was a procurer in the port of Algiers and had no connection with art, but he loved sport, especially swimming. And to do that, he had to cross "La Rue de la Marine" street. One day, he met there (at "Le Café de Daniel") Mustapha Kateb who directed in the fifties an amateur theatrical troupe.

In 1951, he went to Berlin with "El Mesrah El Djazairi" theatrical troupe. In 1952, they were in Paris; singing patriotic texts in Algerian coffees. In 1953, he went to Bucharest for 4th World Festival of Youth and Students for peace. Later the same year, he became a professional actor and engaged in the municipal troupe of Algiers, led by Mahieddine Bachtarzi. For his safety, in 1955, Kouiret was obliged to leave Paris because of the harassment and the persecution of the DST (French domestic intelligence agency). So, he went to Marseille, then to Paris where he met Mohamed Boudia, Hadj Omar, Missoum, and Noureddine Bouhired.

In 1958, he was a member of the theatrical troupe affiliated to the FLN (National Liberation Front) that was trying to make Algeria famous worldwide and to promote the Algerian struggle for freedom.

After the independence of Algeria, he was one of the elements constituted the Algerian National Theatre. In 1963, it was the beginning of his cinematographic career. His first apparition in a film was on a TV adaptation of the play "Les Enfants de la Casbah" by Mustapha Badie (1963) but his real consecration was in "L’Opium et le Bâton" (1970) directed by Ahmed Rachedi. Then came "Décembre"(1971) and many other Algerian and foreign films like "Le Retour de L’Enfant Prodigue", directed by Youssef Chahine in 1976; and "Destins Sanglants" directed by Kheiri Bichara in 1980.

He died on 5 April 2015 in Algiers.

== Filmography ==
- 1968 : Hassan Terro - Directed by Mohammed Lakhdar-Hamina
- 1971 : L'Opium et le Bâton - Directed by Ahmed Rachedi
- 1971 : Décembre - Directed by Mohammed Lakhdar-Hamina
- 1974 : L'Évasion de Hassan Terro - Directed by Mustapha Badie
- 1975 : Chronique des années de braise - Directed by Mohammed Lakhdar-Hamina
- 1976 : Le Retour de l'enfant prodigue - Directed by Youssef Chahine
- 1977 : Les Ambassadeurs Directed by Naceur Ktari
- 1983 : Les Sacrifiés - Directed by Okacha Touita
- 1991 : Les Enfants Du Soleil
- 2004 : Les Suspects - Directed by Kamal Dehane
- 2007 : Morituri - Directed by Okacha Touita

Television

- 1963 : Les Enfants de la casbah - Directed by Abdelhalim Raïs
- 1991 : La famille Ramdam - Directed by Ross Elavy
- 2009 : Bâtiment d'El-Hadj Lakhdar 3 (Imarat El-Hadj Lakhdar 3) - Directed by Mahmoud Zemmour
