= Khaled Benmiloud =

Algerian psychiatrist, academic and writer (1930-2003)

- خالد بن ميلود
- Born: Khaled Benmiloud; 1930; Aïn Sefra, Naâma Province, Algeria
- Died: 25 July 2003 (aged 72–73); Algiers, Algeria
- Citizenship: Algerian
- Occupations: Psychiatrist, professor, writer, screenwriter
- Notable work: Propos d'actualité L'olivier de Boulhilet (screenplay, 1978)

Khaled Benmiloud (in Arabic: خالد بن ميلود), born in 1930 and died on 25 July 2003, was an Algerian psychiatrist, academic, writer and screenwriter. He is considered one of the pioneers of psychiatry and is recognised as the person who humanised the discipline in independent Algeria by founding the University Psychiatric Clinic in Algiers. He also participated in cultural and artistic exchanges, notably through his work as a screenwriter for Algerian cinema.

== Biography ==
He was born in 1930 in Aïn Sefra (Naâma Province). He pursued medical studies in France and received psychiatric training in Geneva before practicing and teaching in Algeria.

== Resignation ==
The administrative or political details surrounding his resignation remain sparse and are known mainly through later testimonies and tributes.

== Cultural activity ==
Alongside his medical work, Benmiloud wrote texts on Algerian culture, personality and society (articles, speeches) and participated in the intellectual life of the country. He is cited in several academic works on Algerian intellectuals and post-colonial cultural construction.

== Cinema ==
Khaled Benmiloud is credited as the screenwriter for the Algerian film L'Olivier de Boulhilet (1978) — a screenplay often presented as (based on a story) by Malek Haddad. The film is referenced in African cinema databases.

== Relationship with Malek Haddad ==
Khaled Benmiloud belonged to the same intellectual circle as Malek Haddad. In a Master's thesis supervised by Professor Jamel Ali-Khodja, this friendship is highlighted. A lifelong companion of Malek Haddad in exile, Haddad had dedicated La Dernière Impression to Khaled Benmiloud's mother: ..Pour celle-là qui dort à Tiout (To the one who sleeps in Tiout).

== Death and legacy ==
He died on 25 July 2003. After his death, numerous tributes (press articles, professional obituaries, academic communications) recalled his role in structuring Algerian psychiatry and his cultural commitment.

== Publications ==
BENMILOUD, K. 1993. Propos d'actualités, Algiers, Editions Dahlab. BENMILOUD, K. 1996. La raison paramagique, Algiers, Editions Dahlab.(ISBN 9961610768)

== Filmography ==
1978: L'olivier de Boulhilet — screenplay (based on a radio tale by Malek Haddad)

== See also ==
- L'olivier de Boulhilet
- Radio Algeria
- Malek Haddad
