= Mohamed Nadir Azizi =

Algerian film director and documentary filmmaker (born 1941)

- Born: Mohamed Nadir Azizi; 1 January 1941 (age 85); Miliana, Algeria
- Citizenship: Algerian
- Occupations: Film director, documentary filmmaker
- Notable work: L'olivier de Boulhilet (1978); Pour que vive l'Algérie! (1972); L'Homme de l'Atlas (1973)

Mohamed Nadir Azizi (born 1 January 1941 in Miliana, Algeria) is an Algerian film director and documentary filmmaker. He directed documentaries produced by ONCIC in the 1970s, as well as at least one notable feature film, L'Olivier de Boulhilet (1978).

== Themes and style ==
His documentaries from the 1970s show an interest in landscapes (e.g. Atlas), historical processes and symbolic figures (e.g. Hommage à l'Émir Abd El-Kader). His films combine a descriptive documentary approach with social and symbolic concerns in fiction, as shown in L'Olivier de Boulhilet, an allegory about modernisation and the rupture between tradition and progress.

== Filmography ==
- 1972: Pour que vive l'Algérie! (Long Live Algeria!) — collective documentary film (segment produced for ONCIC)
- 1973: L'Homme de l'Atlas (The Man from the Atlas) — documentary
- 1973: Signe évocateur (Evocative Sign) — short documentary
- 1978: L'olivier de Boulhilet — feature film, screenplay by Khaled Benmiloud based on a radio story
- 1984: Hommage à l'Émir Abd el-Kader — documentary/historical film

== Algerian press ==
- El Watan — retrospective article mentioning L'Olivier de Boulhilet and actress Zoulikha Laouadj's participation in the film: In 1978, she was 22 years old when she had her first and only experience in cinema in the film L'olivier de Boulhilet.
- L'Expression, article 'Azzeddine Medjoubi à l'affiche' (5 December 2023) — mention of a free screening of Mohamed Nadir Azizi's film L'Olivier de Boulhilet at the Algerian Cultural Centre in Paris.

== See also ==
- Cinema of Algeria
- List of Algerian films
