= Rabah Laradji =

Algerian film director

- رابح لعراجي
- Born: 1943 (age 82–83); Bordj Menaïel, Boumerdès Province, Algeria
- Citizenship: Algerian
- Occupations: Film director, screenwriter, cinematographer
- Notable work: La Bombe (1969), Casbah 74 (1974), Un toit, une famille (1981)

Rabah Laradji (Arabic: رابح لعراجي) was born in 1943 in Bordj Menaïel, Algeria. He is an Algerian film director and screenwriter. A graduate of the National Film Institute of Algiers (INC), Laradji has directed several short and medium-length films and documentaries produced by the ONCIC (National Office for Cinema and Audiovisual Production).

== Biography ==
Born in 1943 in Bordj Menaïel, (Boumerdes), he studied at the National Institute of Cinema in Algiers (INC). Laradji's productions explore social themes such as memory and heritage, as well as historical subjects. His productions with the ONCIC contributed to celebrating the Algerian Revolution..

== Selected filmography ==
- 1969 – La Bombe (short film, ONCIC)
- 1969 – Contribution to Histoires de la révolution (collective film)
- 1969 – Participation in the Pan-African Cultural Festival (technical credits / contribution)
- 1972 – Co-director of Pour que vive l'Algérie ! (collective documentary film, ONCIC)
- 1974 – Casbah 74 (film/video, 20 min)
- 1977 – Nasreddine Dinet (documentary film)
- 1982 – Un toit, une famille (television feature film – social study on housing)
