= Kuku, Algeria =

Coordinates: 36°35′58″N 4°21′39″E

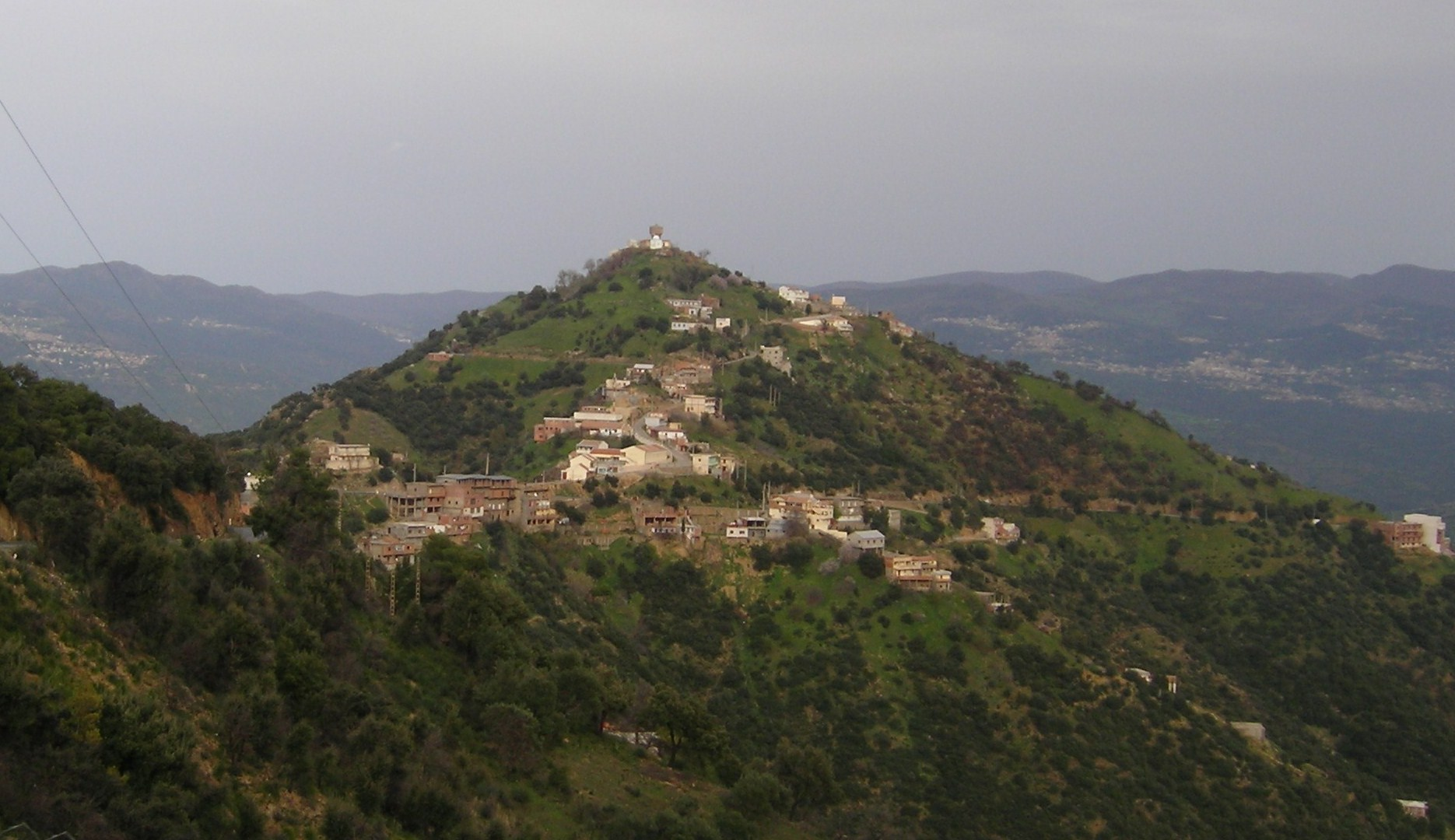
The Koukou village on the mountain of the same name, photographed from Tafrawt

Kuku, Kuko or Koukou (Berber languages: Kuku, Arabic: كوكو, French: Koukou) is a village in the Aït Yahia commune of Tizi Ouzou Province in northern Algeria.
