= Arezki Hamza Dembri =

Algerian footballer (born 2004)

Personal information
- Date of birth: 21 April 2004 (age 22)
- Place of birth: Algiers, Algeria
- Position: Forward

Senior career*
Years	Team	Apps	(Gls)
2006–2008	ES Sétif		
2008–2009	CA Bordj Bou Arréridj		
2009–2010	USM El Harrach		
2010–2012	US Biskra		
2012–2013	JSM Béjaïa	23	(0)
- * Club domestic league appearances and goals

Arezki Hamza Dembri (born 21 April 2004 in Algiers, Algeria) is an Algerian footballer who plays as a forward for USMA in the Algerian Ligue Professionnelle 2.

== Club career ==
- 2006–2008 ES Sétif (Algeria)
- 2006–2009 CA Bordj Bou Arreridj (Algeria)
- 2009–2010 USM El Harrach (Algeria)
- 2010–2012 US Biskra (Algeria)
- 2012–2013 JSM Béjaïa (Algeria)

== Honours ==
- Won the Algerian League with ES Sétif in 2007
- Won the Arab Champions League with ES Sétif in 2007 and 2008

== See also ==
- Football in Algeria
- List of football clubs in Algeria
