= Mekla =

Mekla ⵎⴽⵍⴰ/ⵎⴽⵍɛ
- Commune and town
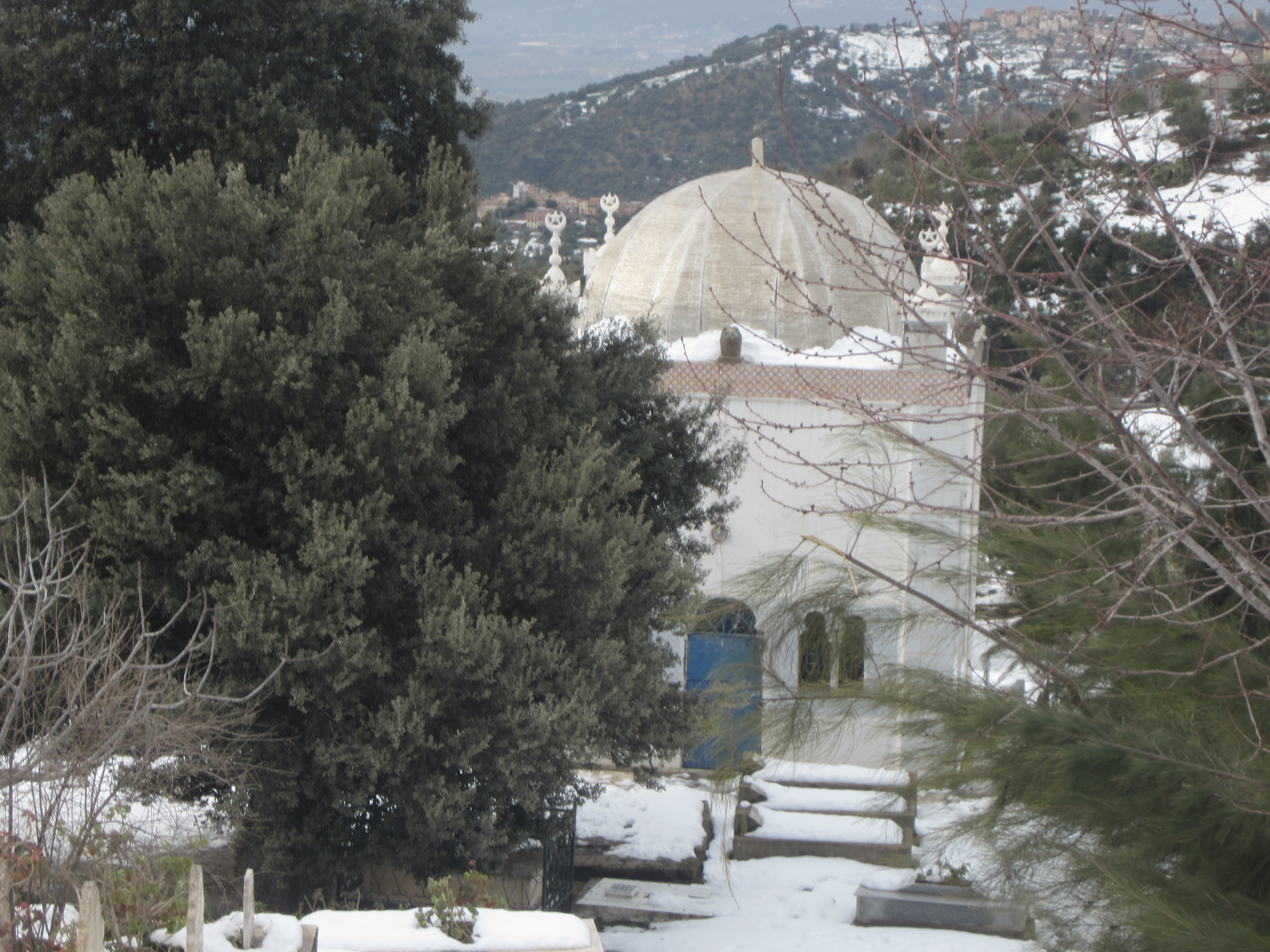
- Sidi M'hamed Ouali (Mekla)

- Location within Algeria
- Country: Algeria
- Province: Tizi Ouzou Province

Population (2008)
  - Total: 24,237
- Time zone: UTC+1 (CET)
- Postal code: 15014

Mekla is a town and commune in Tizi Ouzou Province in northern Algeria.

== Villages ==
The commune of Mekla is composed of 22 villages: Agouni Bouafir, Thala n'Taoueche, Aït Aich, Aït Mansour, Aït Mekki, Aït Moussa, Amazul, Bouzahrir, Chaib, Chaoufa, Djemaa Saharidj, Igoulfane, Laghrous, Lazib, Mahmoud, Maouya, Mekla, Mesloub, Taliouine, Tigrine, Taourirt Adene, Tizi n Terga.

== Economy ==
According to a source, Mekla possesses many water sources such as Tala Mezyant, Tala Megren, Tala Mumen and many more.

== Sport ==
Mekla possess a small Amateur football club called CRB Mekla (Chabab Riadi Baladiat Mekla) they train in a public stadium next to the town's middle school.

== History ==
An English guidebook published in 1891 notes that the town of Mekla was destroyed during an insurrection and replaced by a new French-built village nearby.
