= Un toit, une famille =

Un toit, Une famille
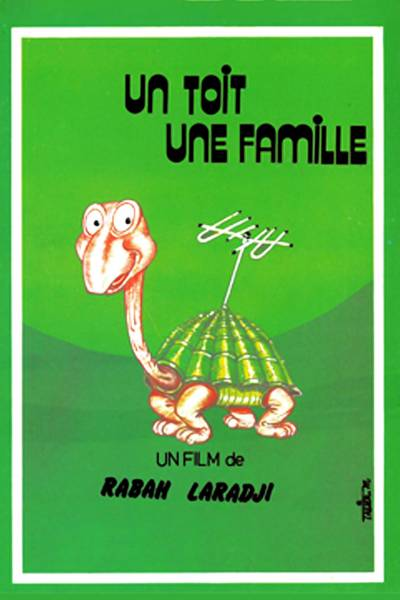
- Poste
- Directed by: Rabah Laradji
- Written by: Rachid Benallal
- Produced by: (ONCIC)
- Starring: Faouzi Saichi, Ahmed Benaïssa, Yahia Benmabrouk, Ouardia Hamitouche
- Release date: 1982
- Running time: 110 minutes
- Country: Algeria
- Language: Arabic

Un toit, Une famille (Arabic: سقف و عائلة) is an Algerian film musical film directed by Rabah Laradji, written by Rachid Benallal, and produced by the ONCIC. The film, presented as a feature-length/tv film from 1981–1982, depicts housing difficulties and family solidarity in Algeria.

== Synopsis ==
Selim Mechoubine, a 28-year-old eldest son in a large family, lives in cramped quarters with his siblings at his parents' house. Longing to get married, he faces a housing crisis. To find a place to live, he must navigate a series of administrative procedures, searches, and obstacles that form the central drama of the film.

== Technical details ==
- Director: Rabah Laradji
- Writer: Rachid Benallal
- Producer: Office National pour le Commerce et l'Industrie Cinématographique (ONCIC)
- Country: Algeria
- Language: Arabic
- Format: 35 mm
- Runtime: approximately 110 minutes

== Cast ==
- Faouzi Saichi — lead role
- Ahmed Benaïssa
- Yahia Benmabrouk
- Ouardia Hamtouche

== Production and context ==
The film is part of a national production led by ONCIC and deals with a major social issue in Algeria: the housing crisis and its family and social repercussions. The direction and cast reflect the early 1980s period, during which Algerian cinema often explored social and family issues.

== Reception and awards ==
According to biographical notes and professional profiles, Faouzi B. Saichi received the "Best Actor Award" for his performance in this film at the Carthage Film Festival (1982).

== See also ==
- Rabah Laradji
- List of Algerian films
