= Souamâa =

- Commune and town
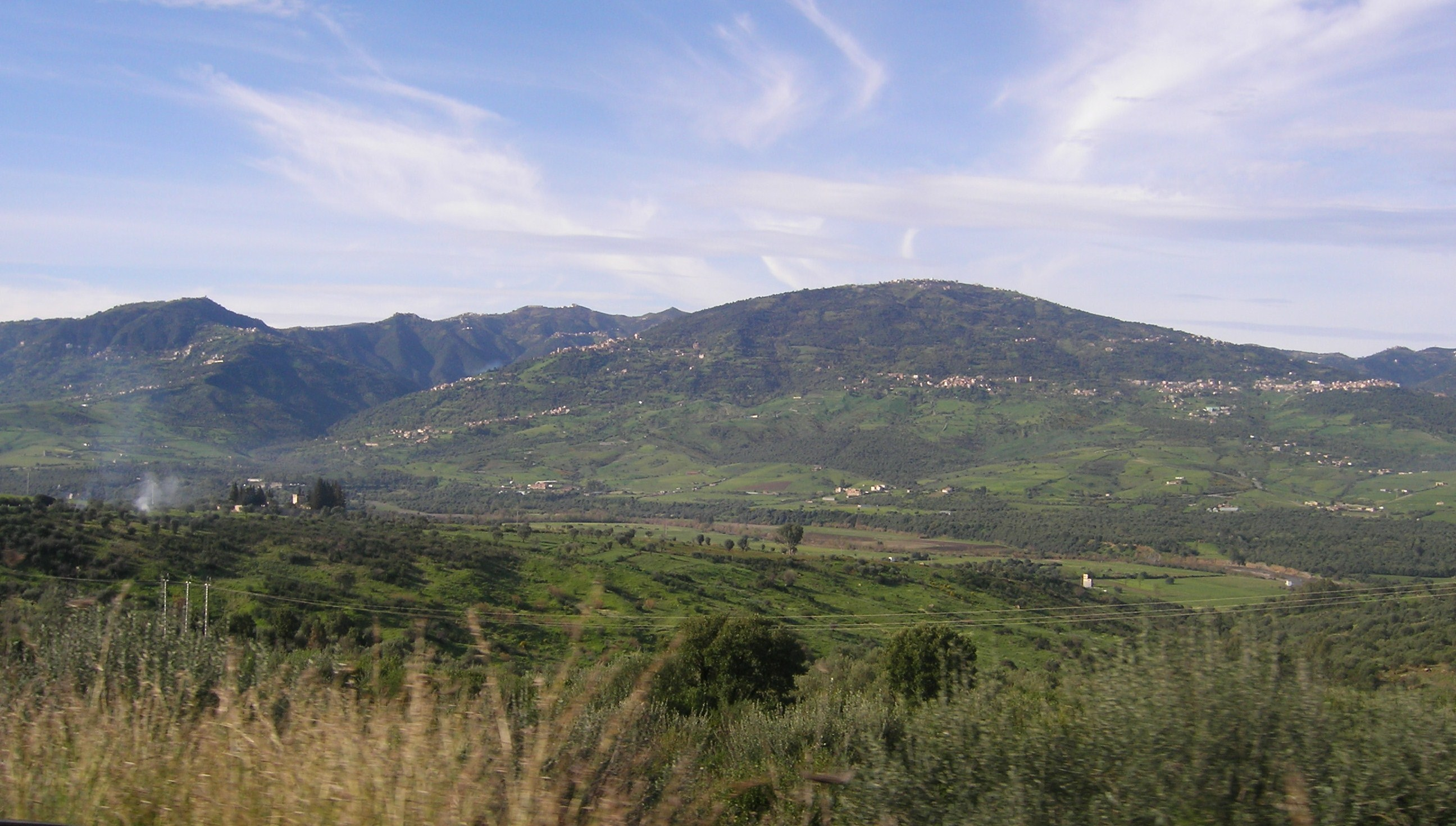

- Location within Algeria
- Country: Algeria
- Province: Tizi Ouzou Province
- Time zone: UTC+1 (CET)

Souamâa is a town and commune in Tizi Ouzou Province, in northern Algeria. It has a population of 9,954 inhabitants, and a density of 249.1 /km² (645.2 /sq mi).
