= Le Retour =

Le Retour may refer to:

== Film and television ==
- Homecoming (2023 film), a 2023 French drama film
- Le Retour, a French Canadian soap opera

== Literature ==
- The Return (Droit novel), a 1964 novel by Michel Droit
- Le Retour, an 1884 short story by Guy de Maupassant

== Music ==
- "Le Retour", a 1962 song by Jean Philippe, representing Switzerland, at the Eurovision Song Contest 1962
- Le Retour, a 1987 album by Gilbert Bécaud
