= Malek Haddad =

Algerian poet and writer

Malek El Haddad

Malek Haddad (born in Constantine, Algeria on 5 July 1927; died in Algiers on 2 June 1978) was an Algerian poet and writer in the French language.

== Partial bibliography ==
- Le Malheur en danger (poems), La Nef de Paris, 1956; Bouchène, 1988 (with an illustration by M'hamed Issiakhem).
- La Dernière impression (novel), Julliard, 1958
- Je t’offrirai une gazelle (novel), Julliard, 1959; re-edition 10/18
- L’Élève et la leçon (novel), Julliard, 1960; re-edition 10/18
- Le Quai aux Fleurs ne répond plus (novel), Julliard 1961; re-edition 10/18
- Les Zéros tournent en rond (essay), Maspero, 1961
- Écoute et je t’appelle (poems), Maspero 1961
