= Le Vent du sud =

- Directed by: Mohamed Slim Riad
- Written by: Abdelhamid Benhedouga
- Starring: Boualem Bennani; Nawal Zaatar; Keltoum; Abdelhalim Rais; Larbi Zekkal
- Music by: Mokadem Ghobrini; Boudjemia Merzak
- Release date: 1975
- Running time: 115 minutes
- Country: Algeria
- Language: Arabic

Le Vent du sud (Arabic: ريح الجنوب; English: The Southerly Wind) is an Algerian film directed by Mohamed Slimane Riad in 1975. Based on the eponymous short story by Abdelhamed Benhedouga. The film aims to address the condition of women in the face of obscurantism and exploitation by the patriarchy..

== Synopsis ==
Nefissa, a young woman from southern Algeria and a student in Algiers, returns home for the summer. Once there, she is confronted with her father's decision to force her into marriage, even though she wants to finish her studies first. She decides to flee to Algiers. Wounded and lost in the mountains, she is rescued by Rabah, a shepherd who, through his encounter with Nefissa, becomes aware of his exploited condition. Together, they discover the opportunities offered by the cooperatives that emerged from the agricultural revolution.

== Technical details ==
Source :

- Director: Mohamed Slim Riad
- Screenplay: Mohamed Slim Riad (adapted from the novel by Abdelhamid Benhedouga)
- Cinematography: Daho Boukerche
- Editing: Rabah Dabouz
- Sound: Cherif Korteby
- Music: Mokadem Ghobrini & Boudjemia Merzak
- Running time: 115 minutes
- Genre: Fiction, social drama
- Country of origin: Algeria
- Language: Arabic

== Cast ==
- Boualem Bennani
- Nawal Zaatar
- Keltoum (Aïcha Adjouri)
- Abdelhalim Rais
- Larbi Zekkal
- Hadj Cherif
- Ahmed Hammoudi

== Production and background ==
The film is a cinematic adaptation of the novel *Rih al-Djanoub* (1970) by Abdelhamid Benhedouga, considered the first Algerian novel written in modern Arabic. Filming included rural and mountainous locations, emphasizing the contrast between rural traditions and modernity represented by education.

== Reception and awards ==
The film was screened and recognized at the FESPACO (Panafrican Film and Television Festival of Ouagadougou). It is also regularly shown at international African and Arab film festivals, and in the Nantes Three Continents Festival.

== Distribution and archiving ==
The film appears in archives and collections dedicated to African cinema. Copies and screenings are mentioned in online cultural databases, film festivals, and national archives.

== See also ==
- List of Algerian films
