= Phylace =

Phylace or Phylake (Φυλακή, Phylake; plural: Φυλακαί Phylakai - lit. "prison") may refer to:

- Phylace (Arcadia), an ancient Greek city in Arcadia
- Phylace (Epirus), an ancient Greek city in Epirus
- Phylace (Thessaly), an ancient Greek city in Thessaly
- Phylace (Pieria), an ancient Greek city in Macedonia
- Amblyscirtes phylace, a species of butterfly of the family Hesperiidae
- Eulithis (syn. Phylace), a genus of moth in the family Geometridae
- A term used to denote Hell or Tartarus

- A term referring to the spirits in prison

== See also ==
- Phylacia, a genus of fungi in the family Xylariaceae
- Phylakitai, the police of Ptolemaic Egypt
