= EDA Youth =

EDA Youth (Greek: Νεολαία ΕΔΑ, 'Neolaia EDA', abbreviated NEDA) was the youth wing of the Greek United Democratic Left (EDA). NEDA was a member of the World Federation of Democratic Youth (WFDY).

NEDA merged with the Grigoris Lambrakis Democratic Youth Movement in September 1964, forming the Lambrakis Democratic Youth (DNL).
