= Lacedaemonia =

Lacedaemonia may refer to:

- Laconia, a modern regional unit of Greece
- The ancient region of Greece of the same name; see Laconia#Ancient history
- Lacedaemonia, the name borne by the city of Sparta from Late Antiquity to the 19th century
- Diocese of Lacedaemon or Lacedaemonia, a titular see of the Catholic Church
