= Botachidae =

Village in ancient Arcadia

Botachidae or Botachidai (Ancient Greek: Βωταχίδαι) was a village in ancient Arcadia, in the territory of Tegea.

Its site is unlocated.
