= Neos Zygos =

Village in Eastern Macedonia, Greece

Neos Zygos Νέος Ζυγός
- Settlement
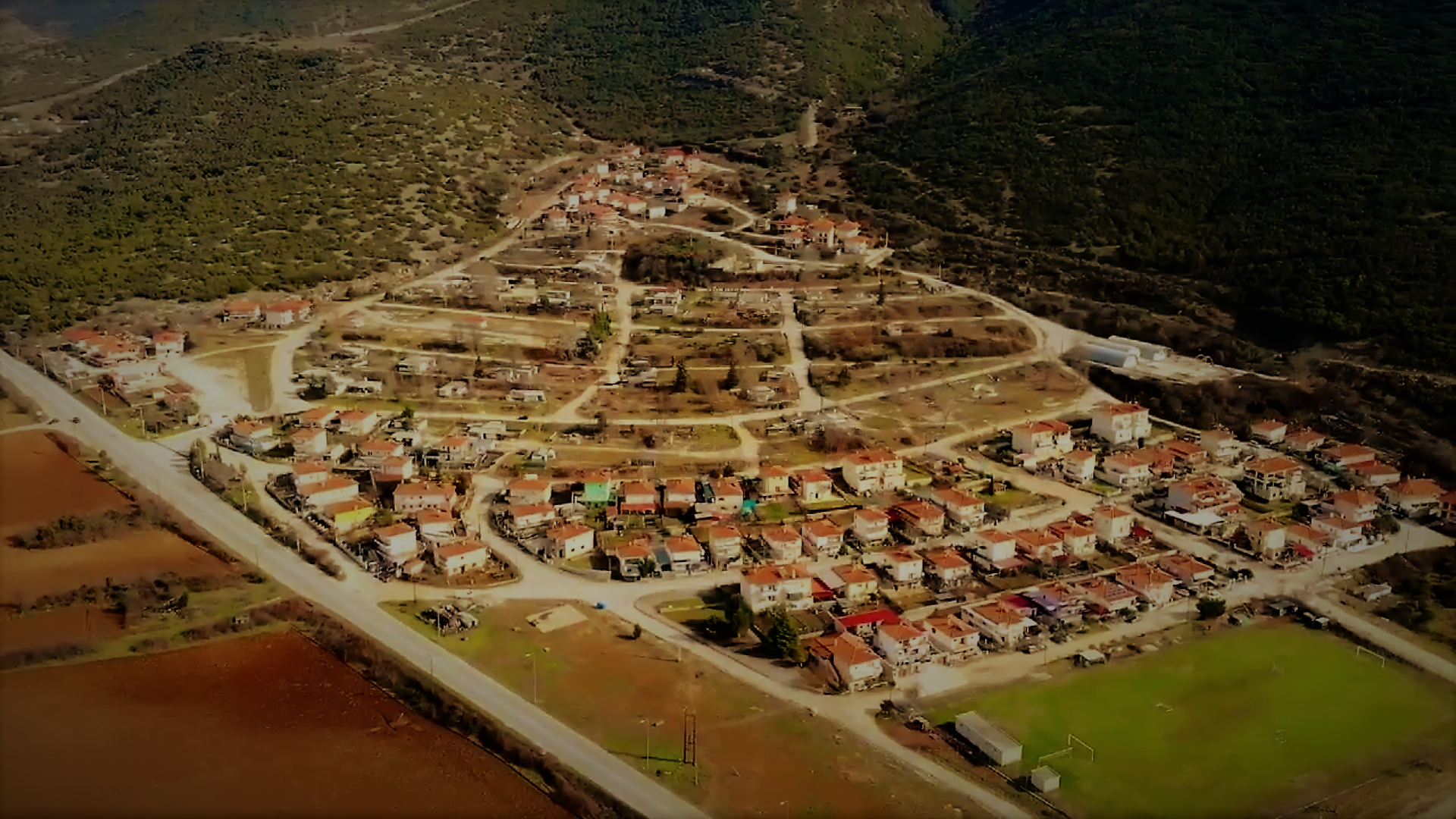

- Location within Greece
- Coordinates: 40°59′08.2″N 24°22′29.9″E
- Country: Greece
- Geographic region: Macedonia
- Administrative region: East Macedonia and Thrace
- Regional unit: Kavala
- Municipality: Kavala
- Municipal unit: Filippoi
- Community: Zygos
- Village established: 1991 (35 years ago)
- Elevation: 99 m (325 ft)

Population (2021)
  - Total: 365
- Time zone: UTC+2 (EET)
  - Summer (DST): UTC+3 (EEST)
- Postal code: 655 00
- Area code: 2510

Neos Zygos (Greek: Νέος Ζυγός, before 2022: Prosfyges, Greek: Πρόσφυγες, lit. 'refugees') is a village in the Kavala regional unit of Greece. It was created in the 1990s with a government grant for the housing of returned Pontic Greek expatriates from the Soviet Union. Between 1990 and 1993, 110 families were settled there. It was recognized as a settlement in 1991 as part of the community of Zygos. As part of the Kapodistrias reform, it became part of the municipality of Filippoi in 1997. Since the implementation of the 2010 Kallikratis Programme, together with Zygos, it constitutes the municipal community of Zygos which belongs to the municipal unit of Filippoi of the municipality of Kavala. According to the 2021 census it has a population of 365 inhabitants. Neos Zygos is located 12 km northwest of Kavala at an altitude of 99 meters above sea level. It is built near and west of the National Road 12, between the villages of Zygos (south), Palaia Kavala (southwest), Amygdaleona (north) and Polystylo (east).

== Sports ==
Neos Zygos is home to two athletic associations of freestyle wrestling (Alexander the Great and Pontos), as well as a football club called Helidoni (Greek: Χελιδόνι, meaning Hirundo), though it ceased to exist in 2017.

== Infrastructure ==
The village of Neos Zygos has installed a new personal weather station, reportedly the first in the eastern plain of Kavala and the first within the network capable of measuring total solar radiation levels.

== See also ==
- List of settlements in the Kavala regional unit
