= Oeatae =

Oeatae or Oiatai (Ancient Greek: Οἰᾶται) was a village in ancient Arcadia, in the territory of Tegea, and one of the nine townships into which ancient Tegea was divided.

Its site is unlocated.
