= Stringos =

Stringos Στρίγκος
- Community
- Location within Greece
- Coordinates: 37°27.1′N 22°23.8′E
- Country: Greece
- Administrative region: Peloponnese
- Regional unit: Arcadia
- Municipality: Tripoli
- Municipal unit: Tegea

Population (2021)
  - Community: 153
- Time zone: UTC+2 (EET)
  - Summer (DST): UTC+3 (EEST)
- Vehicle registration: TP

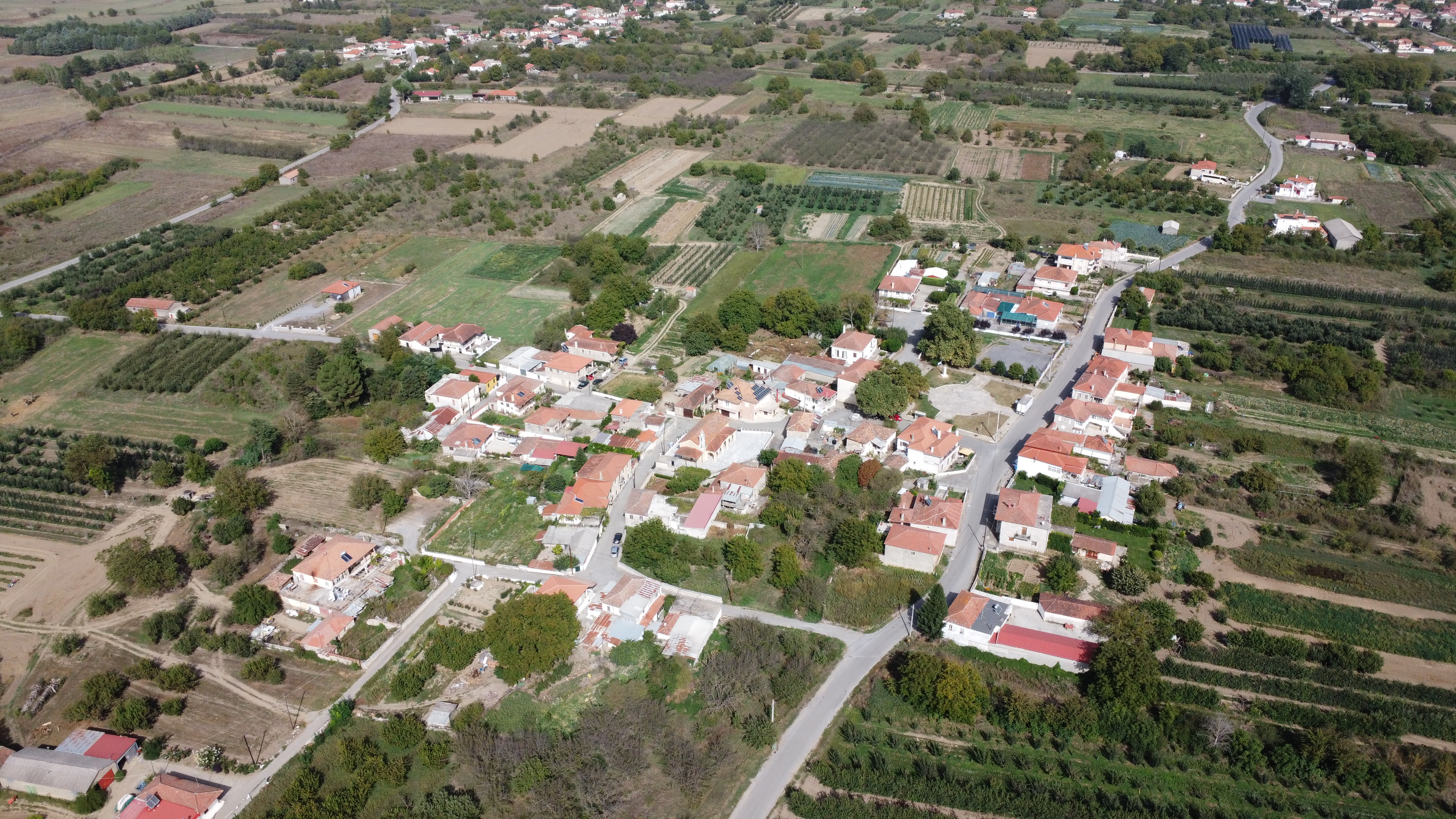
Photo of Stringos

Stringos (Greek: Στρίγκος) is a village and a community in the municipal unit of Tegea, Arcadia, Greece. It is situated in the plain of Tripoli, at 650 m above sea level. The community includes the village Demiri. Stringos is 1 km west of Kerasitsa and 7 km southeast of Tripoli. The Greek National Road 39/E961 (Tripoli – Sparta – Gytheio) passes east of the village.

== Population ==
Year	Population village	Population community
1981	–	307
1991	151	273
2001	132	260
2011	123	210
2021	90	153

== See also ==
- List of settlements in Arcadia
