= Tegea =

Settlement in ancient Greek Arcadia

Tegea Τεγέα
- Municipal unit
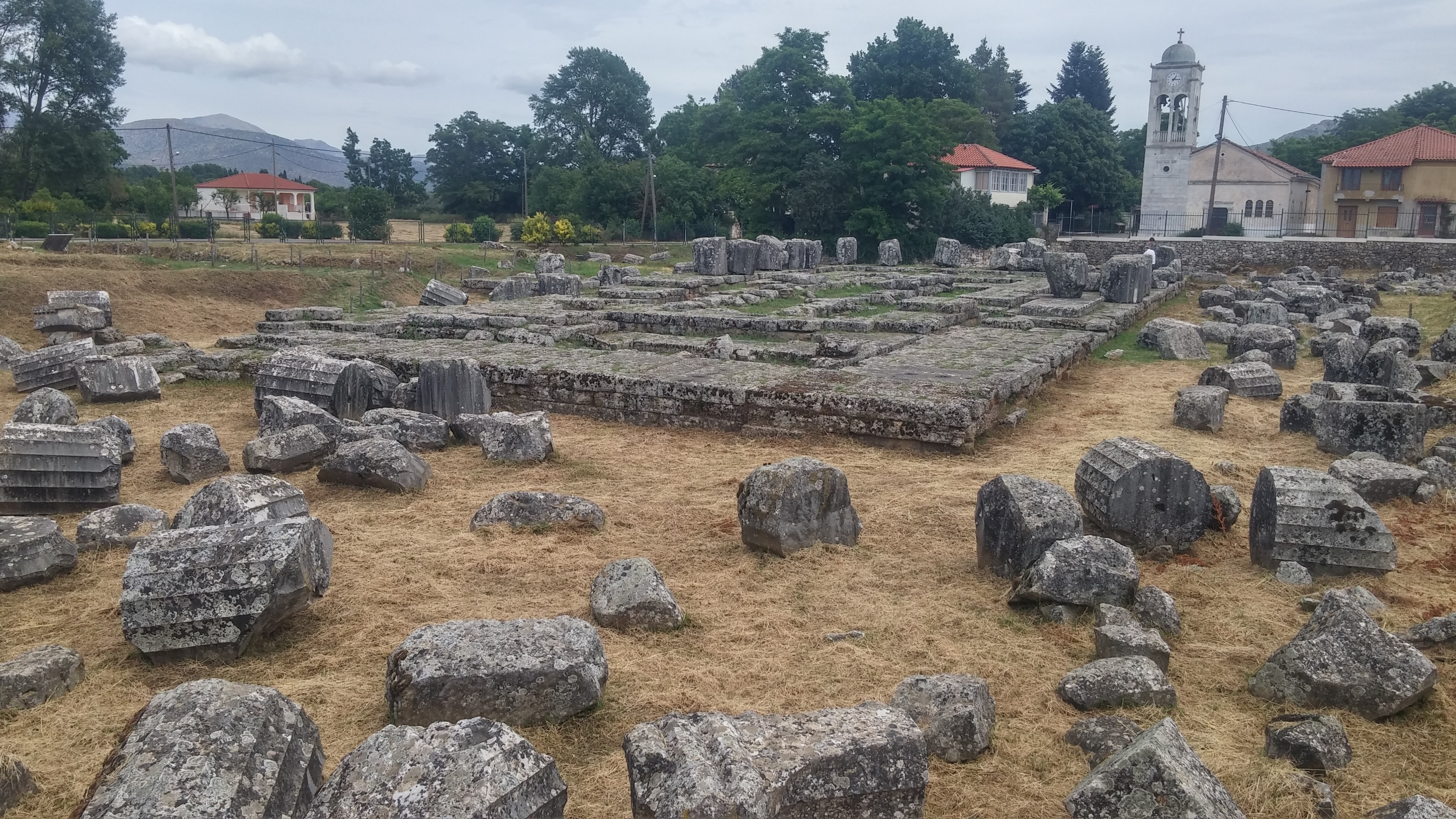
- The Temple of Athena Alea at Tegea

- Location within the regional unit

- Location within Greece
- Coordinates: 37°27.32′N 22°25.23′E
- Country: Greece
- Administrative region: Peloponnese
- Regional unit: Arcadia
- Municipality: Tripoli

Area
  - Municipal unit: 118.35 km^{2} (45.70 sq mi)
- Elevation: 650 m (2,130 ft)

Population (2021)
  - Municipal unit: 2,959
  - Municipal unit density: 25.00/km^{2} (64.76/sq mi)
- Time zone: UTC+2 (EET)
  - Summer (DST): UTC+3 (EEST)
- Postal code: 220 12
- Area code: 2710
- Vehicle registration: TP

Tegea (/ˈtiːdʒiə/; Greek: Τεγέα) was a settlement in ancient Arcadia, and it is also a former municipality in Arcadia, Peloponnese, Greece. Since the 2011 local government reform it is part of the Tripoli municipality, of which it is a municipal unit with an area of 118.350 km^{2}. It is near the modern villages of Alea and Episkopi.

The legendary founder of Tegea was Tegeates, a son of Lycaon.

== History ==
Tegea (Ancient Greek: Τεγέα; Ionic Greek: Τεγέη) was one of the most ancient and powerful towns of ancient Arcadia, situated in the southeast of the country. Its territory, called Tegeatis (Τεγεᾶτις), was bounded by Cynuria and Argolis on the east, from which it was separated by Mount Parthenium, by Laconia on the south, by the Arcadian district of Maenalia on the west, and by the territory of Mantineia on the north. The Tegeatae are said to have derived their name from Tegeates, a son of Lycaon, and to have dwelt originally in eight, afterwards nine, demoi or townships. In the Archaic period the nine demoi that underlie Tegea banded together in a synoecism to form one city; the inhabitants of the demoi were incorporated, by Aleus in the city of Tegea, of which this hero was the reputed founder. The names of these nine townships, which are preserved by Pausanias, are: Gareatae (Γαρεᾶται), Phylaceis (Φυλακεῖς), Caryatae (Καρυᾶται), Corytheis (Κορυθεῖς), Potachidae (Πωταχίδαι), Oeatae (Οἰᾶται), Manthyreis (Μανθυρεῖς), Echeuetheis (Εχευήθεἱς), to which Apheidantes (Ἀφείδαντες) was added as the ninth in the reign of king Apheidas. The Tegeatae were early divided into 4 tribes (phylai) (φυλαί), called respectively Clareotis (Κλαρεῶτις, in inscriptions Κραριῶτις), Hippothoitis (Ἱπποθοῖτις), Apolloneatis (Ἀπολλωνεᾶτις), and Athoneatis (Ἀθανεᾶτις), to each of which belonged a certain number of metoeci (μέτοικοι) or resident aliens.

Tegea is mentioned by Homer in the Catalogue of Ships in the Iliad as one of the places whose troops are led by Agapenor. It was probably the most celebrated of all the Arcadian towns in the earliest times. This appears from its heroic renown, since its king Echemus is said to have slain Hyllus, the son of Heracles, in single combat. The Tegeatae offered a long-continued and successful resistance to the Spartans, when the latter attempted to extend their dominion over Arcadia. In one of the wars between the two peoples, Chariläus or Charillus, king of Sparta, deceived by an oracle which appeared to promise victory to the Spartans, invaded Tegeatis, and was not only defeated, but was taken prisoner with all his men who had survived the battle. More than two centuries afterwards, in the reign of Leon and Agesicles, the Spartans again fought unsuccessfully against the Tegeatae; but in the following generation, in the time of their king Anaxandridas II, the Spartans, having obtained possession of the bones of Orestes in accordance with an oracle, defeated the Tegeatae and compelled them to acknowledge the supremacy of Sparta, about 560 BC. Thus, Tegea's struggle against Spartan hegemony in Arcadia came to an end, and it was forced into some form of collaboration, maybe as one of the earliest members of what would become the Sparta-centered Peloponnesian League.

Tegea, however, still retained its independence, though its military force was at the disposal of Sparta; and in the Greco-Persian Wars it appears as the second military power in the Peloponnesus, having the place of honour on the left wing of the allied army. Five hundred of the Tegeatae fought at the Battle of Thermopylae, and 3000 at the Battle of Plataea, half of their force consisting of hoplites and half of light-armed troops. As it was not usual to send the whole force of a state upon a distant march, William Smith and Henry Fynes Clinton estimate the force of the Tegeatae on this occasion as not more than three-fourths of their whole number. This would give 4000 for the military population of Tegea, and about 17,400 for the whole free population.

Soon after the Battle of Plataea, the Tegeatae were again at war with the Spartans, of the causes of which, however, we have no information. We only know that the Tegeatae fought twice against the Spartans between 479 and 464 BCE, and were each time defeated; first in conjunction with the Argives, and a second time together with the other Arcadians, except the Mantineians at Dipaea, in the Maenalian district. About this time, and also at a subsequent period, Tegea, and especially the temple of Athena Alea in the city, was a frequent place of refuge for persons who had rendered themselves obnoxious to the Spartan government. Hither fled the seer Hegesistratus and the kings Leotychides, and Pausanias, son of Pleistoanax.

In the Peloponnesian War the Tegeatae were the firm allies of the Spartans, to whom they remained faithful both on account of their possessing an aristocratical constitution, and from their jealousy of the neighbouring democratical city of Mantineia, with which they were frequently at war. Thus the Tegeatae not only refused to join the Argives in the alliance formed against Sparta in 421 BCE, but they accompanied the Lacedaemonians in their expedition against Argos in 418 BCE. They also fought on the side of the Spartans in the Corinthian War, 394 BCE. The Temple of Athena Alea burned in 394 BCE and was magnificently rebuilt, to designs by Scopas of Paros, with reliefs of the Calydonian boar hunt in the main pediment. After the Battle of Leuctra (371 BCE), however, the Spartan party in Tegea was expelled, and the city joined the other Arcadian towns in the foundation of Megalopolis and in the formation of the Arcadian League. When Mantineia a few years afterwards quarrelled with the supreme Arcadian government, and formed an alliance with its old enemy Sparta, Tegea remained faithful to the new confederacy, and fought under Epaminondas against the Spartans at the great Battle of Mantineia, 362 BCE.

Tegea at a later period joined the Aetolian League, but soon after the accession of Cleomenes III to the Spartan throne it formed an alliance with Sparta, together with Mantineia and Orchomenus. It thus became involved in hostilities with the Achaeans, and in the war which followed, called the Cleomenic War, it was taken by Antigonus Doson, the ally of the Achaeans, and annexed to the Achaean League, 222 BCE. In 218 BCE, Tegea was attacked by Spartan king Lycurgus, who obtained possession of the whole city with the exception of the acropolis. It subsequently fell into the hands of Machanidas, the tyrant of Sparta, but was recovered by the Achaeans after the defeat of Machanidas, who was slain in battle by Philopoemen. In the time of Strabo Tegea was the only one of the Arcadian towns which continued to be inhabited, and it was still a place of importance in the time of Pausanias, who has given us a minute account of its public buildings. The "tombs" he saw there were shrines to the chthonic founding daemones: "There are also tombs of Tegeates, the son of Lycaon, and of Maira (or Maera), his wife." Maira was a daughter of Atlas, and Homer makes mention of her in the passage where Odysseus tells to Alkinous his journey to Hades, and of those whose ghosts he beheld there."

Ancient Tegea was an important religious center of ancient Greece, containing the Temple of Athena Alea. The temenos was founded by Aleus, Pausanias was informed. Votive bronzes at the site from the Geometric and Archaic periods take the forms of horses and deer; there are sealstones and fibulae.

The city retained civic life under the Roman Empire; Tegea survived being sacked by the Goths in AD 395–396. The Roman poets use the adjective Tegĕēus or Tegeaeus as equivalent to Arcadian: thus it is given as an epithet to Pan (Verg. G. 1.18), Callisto, daughter of Lycaon (Ov. Ar. Am. 2.55, Fast. 2.167), Atalanta (Ov. Met. 8.317, 380), Carmenta (Ov. Fast. 1.627), and Mercury (Stat. Silv. 1.54)

In the Middle Ages, through some unclear process, Tegea received the name of Amyklion (later usually shortened to Amykli and Nikli) by the 10th century. In 1082, it became the seat of the Diocese of Amyclae, a suffragan see of the Metropolis of Lacedaemon. Nikli and the rest of Arcadia were captured by the Crusaders in c. 1206–1209, becoming part of the new Frankish Principality of Achaea, which soon came to encompass most of the Peloponnese. The Chronicle of the Morea depicts Nikli as a site of some importance and fortified, which fell to the Crusaders only after a siege. It became the seat of a secular barony, while a Roman Catholic bishop was installed in the episcopal see. Nikli was still in Frankish hands in 1280, but was lost to the resurgent Byzantines by 1302, who also restored the local see to the Orthodox clergy.

The site of ancient Tegea is now located within the modern village of Alea (referred to as Piali before 1915). Alea is located about 10 kilometers southeast of Tripoli. The municipality of Tegea has its seat at Stadio.

=== Tegea and Crete ===
In ancient times, the people of Tegea said that Cydon, Archedius, and Gortys, the surviving sons of their king Tegeates, migrated voluntarily to Crete, and that the cities Kydonia, Gortyna, and Catreus, were named after them. Yet the Cretans denied this; instead they tried to portray these three characters as the offspring of the local heroes Minos and Rhadamantus.

== Subdivisions ==
The municipal unit Tegea is subdivided into the following communities (constituent villages in brackets):

- Alea
- Episkopi
- Garea
- Kamari
- Kandalos
- Kerasitsa, where the politician Gregoris Lambrakis was born in 1912
- Lithovounia
- Magoula (Magoula, Giokareika)
- Manthyrea
- Mavriki
- Psili Vrysi (Psili Vrysi, Bouzaneika)
- Rizes
- Stadio (Stadio, Agios Sostis, Akra)
- Tzivas
- Vouno
- Stringos (Stringos, Demiri)

== Historical population ==
Year	Population
1991	4,539
2001	3,858
2011	3,544
2021	2,959

== Notable people ==
- Aristarchus of Tegea, poet (5th century BC)
- Anyte of Tegea, poet (3rd century BC)
- Cepheus, mythical king and an Argonaut
- Echemus, mythical king
- Telephus, mythical king

== See also ==
- List of settlements in Arcadia
- List of ancient Greek cities

== Sources ==
- Bon, Antoine (1969). La Morée franque. Recherches historiques, topographiques et archéologiques sur la principauté d'Achaïe (in French). Paris: De Boccard.
- Gritsopoulos, Tasos (1939). Η μετά της επισκοπής Αμυκλών ένωσις της πατριαρχικής εξαρχίας Τριπολιτζάς. Deltion of the Christian Archaeological Society (in Greek). 4: 108–117. Archived from the original on 2015-04-18.
- Konti, Voula (1985). Συμβολή στην ιστορική γεωγραφία της Αρκαδίας (395-1209) (PDF). Byzantina Symmeikta (in Greek). 6: 91–124. doi:10.12681/byzsym.699. Archived from the original (PDF) on 2015-04-18.
