= Manthyrea =

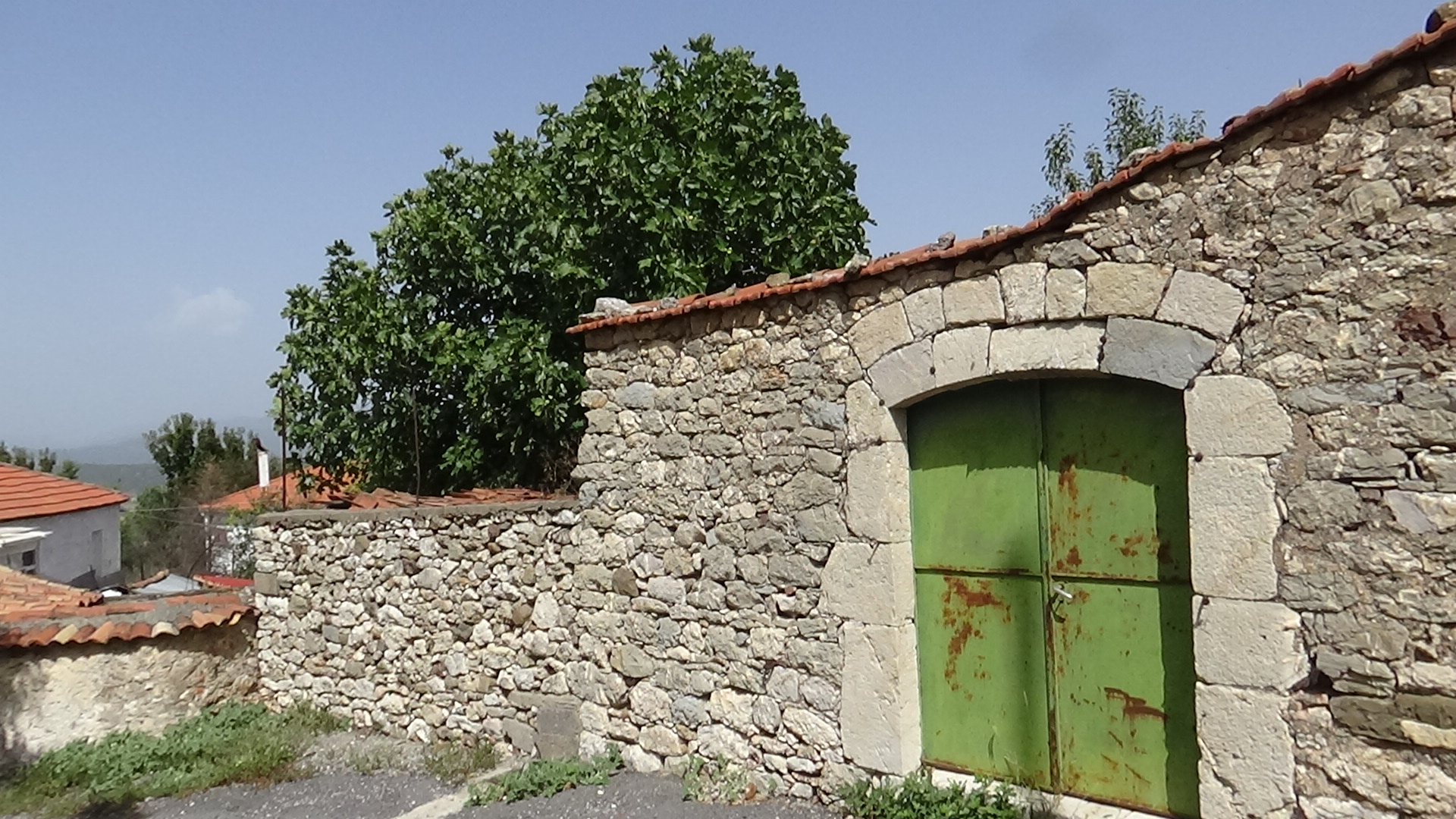

Manthyrea (Ancient Greek: Μανθυρέα) is the name of a village in Arcadia, Greece, corresponding to an ancient place name, but not in its exact location.

== Manthyrea in antiquity ==
Manthyrea was a village in ancient Arcadia, in the territory of Tegea. An image of the goddess Athena that Pausanias describes seeing at Tegea came from Manthyrea. Its site is unlocated.

== Modern Manthyrea ==
Modern Manthyrea is one of the southern villages of the region of Tegea. It is inhabited mainly by farmers. In the past (1950s mainly) many inhabitants had left for the United States and still have associations which occasionally support welfare of the village. The center of the village is occupied by the church of Hagios Nikolaos, behind which lies the primary school and a playground.
