= Caryatae =

Caryatae or Karyatai (Ancient Greek: Καρυᾶται) was a village in ancient Arcadia, in the territory of Tegea, and one of the nine townships into which ancient Tegea was divided.

Its site is unlocated.
