= Grigoris Lambrakis =

20th-century Greek physician, left-wing politician, and anti-war activist

Grigoris Lambrakis MP
- Γρηγόρης Λαμπράκης
- Grigoris Lambrakis marching alone in the banned Marathon – Athens Peace Rally on Sunday 21 April 1963, one month before his assassination.

Member of the Hellenic Parliament
- In office 1961–1963
- Constituency: Piraeus

Personal details
- Born: 3 April 1912 Kerasitsa, Arcadia, Greece
- Died: 27 May 1963 (aged 51) Thessaloniki, Greece
- Party: Independent, elected on the list of the United Democratic Left
- Spouse(s): Maro and Roula
- Children: 3
- Education: University of Athens
- Occupation: Gynecologist

Grigoris Lambrakis (Greek: Γρηγόρης Λαμπράκης; 3 April 1912 – 27 May 1963) was a Greek politician, physician, athlete, and lecturer. He participated in track and field sports and was a member of the faculty of the School of Medicine at the University of Athens. A member of the Greek resistance to Axis rule during World War II, he later became a prominent anti-war activist. His assassination by right-wing extremists that were allegedly supported by the police and military provoked mass protests and led to a political crisis.

== Early life ==
Lambrakis was born in the village of Kerasitsa in the district of Tegea (Arcadia, the Peloponnese). After finishing high school in his home town, he moved to Athens to enter the School of Medicine at the University of Athens.

Lambrakis was a champion athlete throughout his life. He held the Greek record for long jump for twenty-three years (1936–1959). He also earned several gold medals in the Balkan Games, which took place annually, featuring competitors from Greece, Albania, Yugoslavia, Bulgaria, Romania, and Turkey. He competed in the men's long jump and the men's triple jump at the 1936 Summer Olympics.

During the Axis occupation of Greece during World War II (1941–44), Lambrakis participated actively in the Greek Resistance. In 1943 he set up the Union of Greek Athletes (Ένωση των Ελλήνων Αθλητών, Enosi ton Ellínon Athlitón) and organized regular competitions. He used the revenue from these games to fund public food-banks for the starving population.

== Postwar activism ==
After World War II, Lambrakis completed his medical studies and worked as a lecturer in the Department of gynaecology and published more than 40 scientific papers in a Greek book about endocrinology when the subject was not seen as a distinct discipline in Greece. He continued to help the poor by running a small private clinic for patients who were unable to afford medical care.

While not a Communist, Lambrakis' political and ideological orientation leaned towards the left. He was actively involved in the pacifist movement of his time, which voiced strong opposition to the First Indochina War and the Second American War in Vietnam. Lambrakis acted politically from within the United Democratic Left (Greek: Ενιαία Δημοκρατική Αριστερά, ΕΔΑ/Eniéa Dimokratikí Aristerá, EDA), the only legal left-wing political party in the country after the Greek Civil War of 1946–1949 and until the fall of the Greek military junta of 1967-1974. He was elected to the Hellenic Parliament in the 1961 Greek legislative election as a Piraeus MP.

That same year (1961), under his initiative, the Commission for International Détente and Peace was established in Greece. In his capacity as Vice President of EDYE, Lambrakis participated in international pacifist meetings and demonstrations despite frequent threats against his life. EDYE was an organization set up by EDA which while not officially aligned to the World Council of Peace broadly supported its anti-capitalist and anti-imperialist position. EDA had ceded Lambrakis full freedom to represent the Commission and he soon emerged as its most articulate and determined leader. On 21 April 1963, the pacifist movement in Greece organized the First Pacifist Rally from Marathon to Athens. The police intervened, banned the rally and arrested many demonstrators (Mikis Theodorakis among them). Lambrakis, protected by his parliamentary immunity, marched alone and arrived at the end of the rally holding the banner with the peace symbol (photo), the one that he had previously held up during the Aldermaston rally in the United Kingdom while he was protesting near the Atomic Weapons Research Establishment (AWRE). Soon afterward, he too was arrested by the police.

== Assassination ==
On 22 May 1963, shortly after he had delivered the keynote speech at an anti-war meeting in Thessaloniki, two far-right extremists, Emannouel Emannouilides and Spyros Gotzamanis, driving a three-wheeled vehicle, struck Lambrakis with a club over the head in plain view of a large number of people and (allegedly) some police officers. He suffered brain injuries and died in the hospital five days later, on 27 May. The two men were arrested because of the reaction of a by-stander (Manolis Hatziapostolou) who jumped on their vehicle and fought with them.

== Events following his assassination ==
The next day, in Athens, his funeral became a massive demonstration. More than 500,000 people rallied to protest against the right-wing government and the Royal Court, seen by many to support the activities of the right-wing extremists. The assassination of Lambrakis initiated an enormous popular reaction, and soon after, investigator Christos Sartzetakis, district attorney Nikos Athanasopoulos and attorney general Pavlos Delaportas uncovered connections of the police and army, including the Gendarmerie commander for Northern Greece, Konstantinos Mitsou, and various local police officers, like Kapelonis and Katsoulis, to far-right extremists.

The judges lost their jobs during the military dictatorship of 1967. Christos Sartzetakis was also imprisoned for a year during the dictatorship. The two murderers were released, while members of the conspiracy were favored.

Sartzetakis, although a royalist himself, became a symbol of integrity for his handling of the investigation.

The events that followed the assassination of Lambrakis led to rapid political developments. Prime Minister Konstantinos Karamanlis resigned and left for Paris in July 1963. Soon thereafter, thousands of Greek youth founded a new political organisation called the Lambrakis Democratic Youth. Mikis Theodorakis, one of Lambrakis' friends and fellow activists, was elected its first president. This leftist political organisation played a decisive role in Greece's progressive movement of the 1960s. In 1966 a 'Greek Democratic Youth of Australia Lambrakis' was formed in all capitals of the States of Australia by young Greek workers and students.

Christos Sartzetakis went on to a distinguished career and was President of Greece 1985-1990.

== Legacy ==
The life and death of Grigoris Lambrakis inspired the author Vassilis Vassilikos to write the political novel Z: Fictional Documentary of a Crime. The title stands for the first letter of the Greek word "Zi" ("[He] Lives!"), a popular graffito which began to appear in Greek cities in the 1960s, illustrating the growing protest against the conditions that led to the assassination of Lambrakis.In 1969, the Greek-French film director Costa-Gavras (Κώστας Γαβράς) made the film Z, which was a great success. Yves Montand starred as Lambrakis, Jean-Louis Trintignant as investigator Sartzetakis and Irene Papas as Lambrakis' widow.

Mikis Theodorakis in 1962 presented his work Ένας όμηρος (A Hostage), a music score for a Greek performance of The Hostage by Brendan Behan. The piece Το γελαστό παιδί (The Smiling Kid) was considered to be a tribute to Lambrakis, and as such was also used in the film Z.

Lambrakis remained in the hearts of the Greek people as a national symbol of democracy, representing the struggle against political repression, Royal Court scandal, and international dependence. After the fall of the military dictatorship in 1974, numerous places, including a football stadium in Kallithea and streets and squares throughout the country, have been named in honor of Grigoris Lambrakis.

The Marathon Peace Rally became an annual event in Lambrakis' memory. Also, the Athens Classic Marathon is run in memory of Grigoris Lambrakis every November.

== See also ==
- Internal exile in Greece
- Oswaldo Payá
- United Democratic Left
- History of Modern Greece
- Christos Sartzetakis
- List of peace activists
- Z (1969 film)
