= Zygos =

Village in Eastern Macedonia, Greece

Zygos Ζυγός
- Community
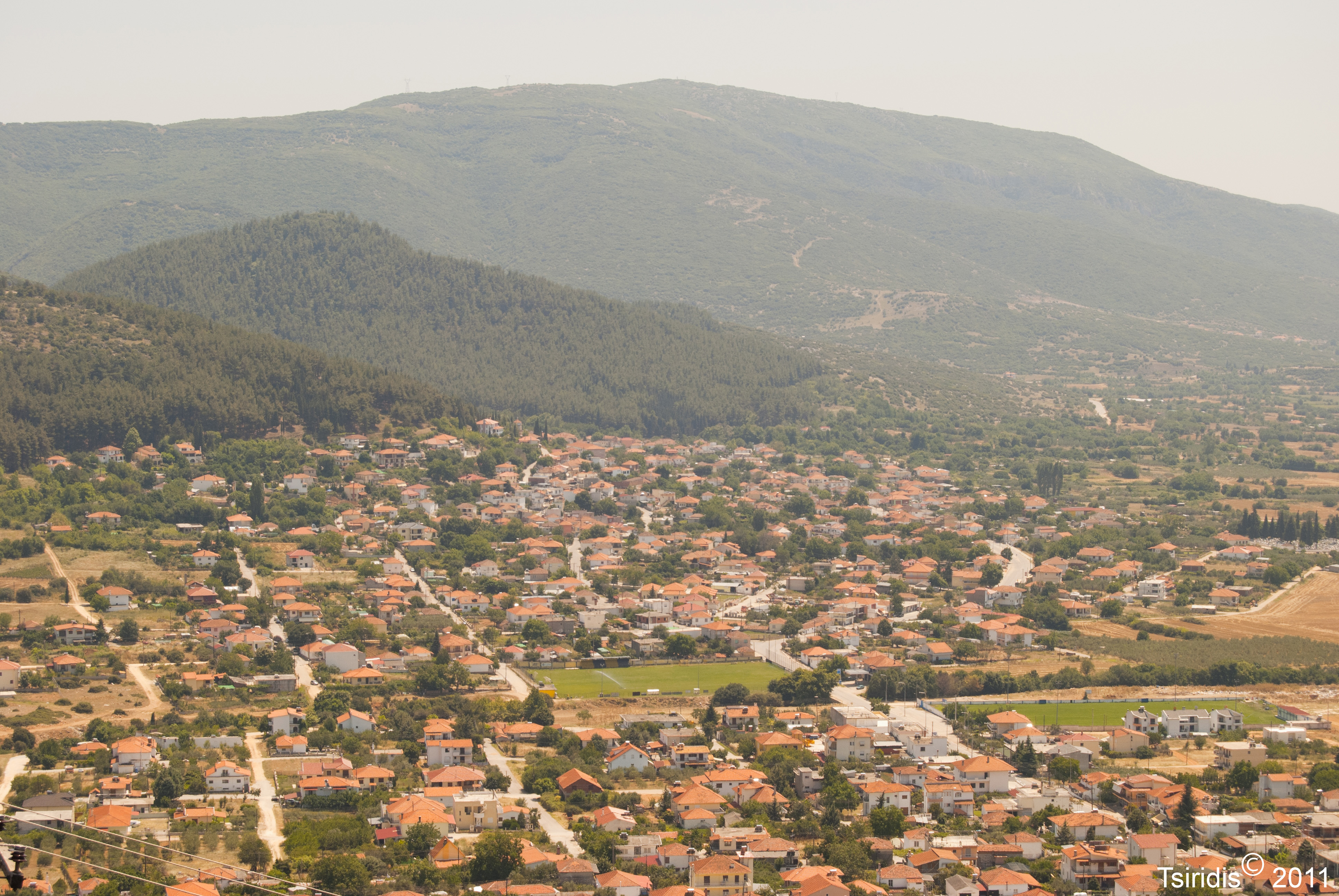
- Zygos

- Location within Greece
- Coordinates: 41°1′N 24°23′E
- Country: Greece
- Geographic region: Macedonia
- Administrative region: East Macedonia and Thrace
- Regional unit: Kavala
- Municipality: Kavala
- Municipal unit: Filippoi
- Elevation: 78 m (256 ft)

Population (2021)
  - Community: 1,574
- Time zone: UTC+2 (EET)
  - Summer (DST): UTC+3 (EEST)
- Postal code: 640 03
- Area code: 2510
- Vehicle registration: ΚΒ

Zygos (Greek: Ζυγός) is a village and a community, part of the municipality of Kavala in the Kavala regional unit of Greece. The community also includes the village of Neos Zygos.

== Name ==
The name of the village is Zygos, the Greek word for balancing scales.

== Location ==
The village is located approximately 13 km north of Kavala. Zygos after the extensive reformation of administrative structure of Greece under the plan Kallikratis belongs to Municipality of Kavala. Located at the foot-hill of a dense pine forest, at the eastern edge of the Pangaio valley.

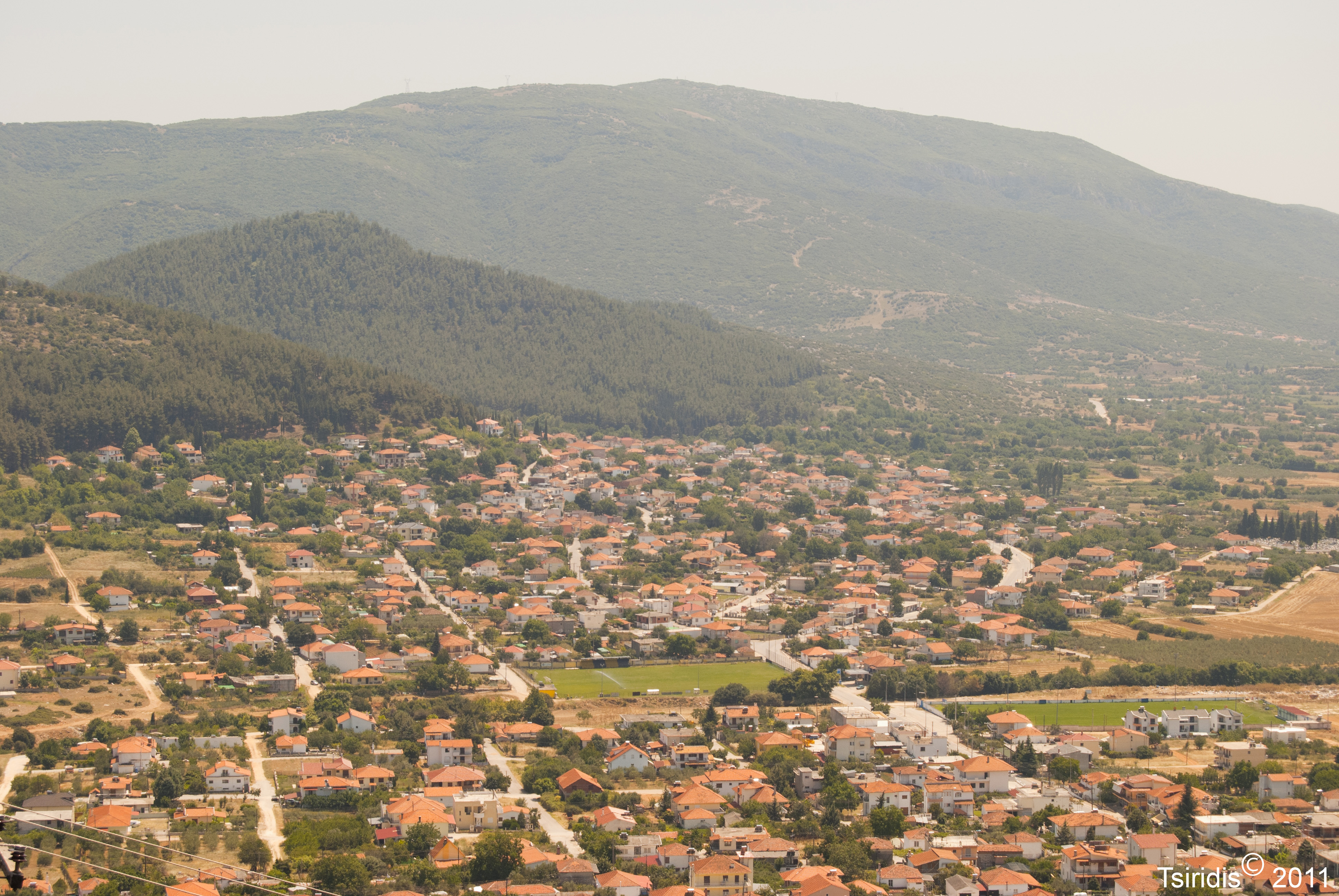
Zygos village as seen from North.

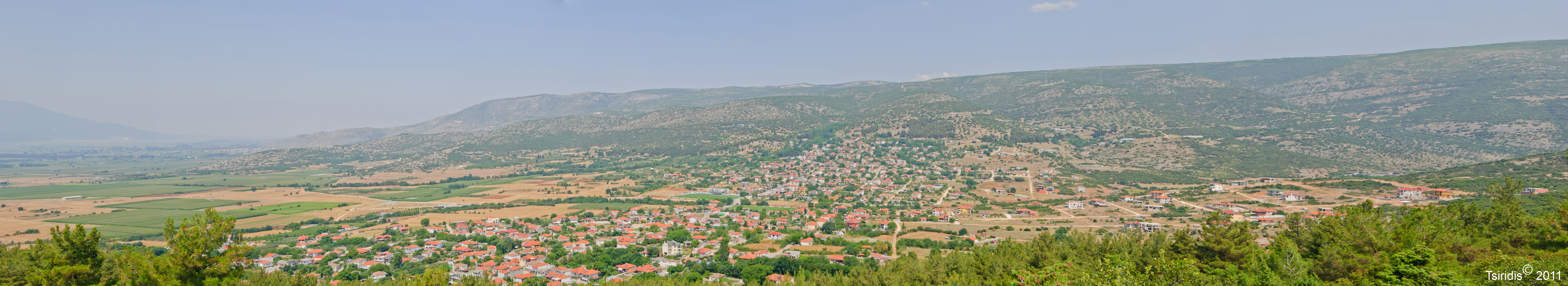
Panomara Photo of Zygos village as seen from Zygos hill.

== Sports ==
The village is famous for its football team, named Aris Zygou. Aris Zygou founded in 1933 and ceased to exist because of the World War II. The team refounded in 1946 and its 4th oldest teams in Kavala. Aris Zygou is among the most successful teams based in villages. Aris Zygou has played in the fourth national league of Greece for two periods 1990–91 and 1991–92. The team won the Kavala Cup in 2006.

== See also ==
- List of settlements in the Kavala regional unit
- Zygos Movement
