= Z (1969 film) =

1969 film by Costa-Gavras

- Theatrical release poster
- Directed by: Costa-Gavras
- Screenplay by: Jorge Semprún; Costa-Gavras
- Based on: Z: Fictional Documentary of a Crime by Vassilis Vassilikos
- Produced by: Jacques Perrin; Ahmed Rachedi
- Starring: Yves Montand; Irene Papas; Jean-Louis Trintignant; Charles Denner; Georges Géret; Jacques Perrin; François Périer; Bernard Fresson; Pierre Dux; Julien Guiomar; Marcel Bozzuffi; Magali Noël; Renato Salvatori
- Cinematography: Raoul Coutard
- Edited by: Françoise Bonnot
- Music by: Mikis Theodorakis
- Production companies: Office National pour le Commerce et l'Industrie Cinématographique; Reggane Films; Valoria Films
- Distributed by: Varloria Films (France)
- Release date: 26 February 1969 (France)
- Running time: 127 minutes
- Countries: France; Algeria
- Languages: French; Russian; English
- Box office: $17.3 million (United States)

Z is a 1969 political thriller film directed by Costa-Gavras, from a screenplay he co-wrote with Jorge Semprún, adapted from the 1967 novel by Vassilis Vassilikos. The film presents a thinly fictionalized account of the events surrounding the assassination of democratic Greek politician Grigoris Lambrakis in 1963. With its dark view of Greek politics and its downbeat ending, the film captures the director's outrage about the junta that ruled Greece at the time when it was made. The title refers to a popular Greek protest slogan (Greek: Ζει, IPA: [ˈzi]) meaning "he lives," in reference to Lambrakis.

A French and Algerian co-production, the film stars Jean-Louis Trintignant as the investigating magistrate, an analogue of Christos Sartzetakis, who would become the president of Greece from 1985 to 1990. International stars Yves Montand and Irene Papas also appear, but despite their star billing, they have shorter screen time. Jacques Perrin, who also produced the film, plays a key role as a photojournalist. Other actors in the film include Pierre Dux, Charles Denner, François Périer, Georges Géret and Bernard Fresson. The musical score was composed by Mikis Theodorakis.

Z was a surprise international hit and is considered to be a landmark film of the political thriller genre. It became the first non-English language film to receive nominations for the Academy Awards in both Best Picture and Best Foreign Language Film categories; winning in the Best Foreign Language Film category. It also received numerous other accolades including Best Actor for Trintignant and Jury Prize at the Cannes Film Festival and the Golden Globe Award for Best Foreign Film.

== Plot ==
The left-wing opposition in a Mediterranean country plans to have a famous government deputy give a speech advocating for nuclear disarmament, but the government interferes by pressuring venues to deny them space and setting thugs on them to tear down posters and harass attendees. The opposition receive an anonymous tip about a threat to the deputy's life and report it to government officials, but they dismiss the claims.

During the speech, Pirou, another deputy, goes to find their promised protection, but is mistaken for the real target and savagely beaten before his assailants realize they have the wrong man. As the intended target crosses the street from the hall after giving his speech, a delivery truck speeds past him, and a man on the open truck bed strikes him down with a club. The Chief Prosecutor is informed of the incident and the General, head of the state police and a fierce anticommunist, lies that the deputy has been injured by a drunk driver, Yago, who they have in custody. The phone then rings, revealing the deputy has died.

At the hospital, the magistrate assigned to the investigation learns that the autopsy indicates the deputy died from blows to the head, not a car crash. He is informed of a witness, but before he can testify, the man is hit by a club from a passing car. The General and the man's family, who are sympathetic to the government, visit the man in the hospital and pressure him not to testify, but he does anyway, saying that Yago, his delivery driver, talked openly about the plan to murder the Deputy. The journalist visits the man and unwittingly spoils an assassination attempt by the Deputy's assailant Vago, who has been placed in the hospital by the government and is arrested. During the interrogation, the magistrate baits Vago into revealing that he is part of a clandestine anti-communist group, the Christian Royalist Organization against Communism (CROC), with ties to the state police.

With the help of a CROC informer, the journalist learns more about the organization and photographs members that the informer points out. He then takes the photos to Pirou, who identifies his assailant. It is later revealed that the Colonel bribed Pirou's assailant with a lifetime peddling license and new house to assist in their plan against the deputy. As the magistrate continues to investigate CROC, he demands that the opposition counselor produce the witness who originally told them of the plot against the deputy, revealed to be a fellow deliveryman with ties to the former Greek communist resistance movement. He describes Yago threatening him into silence, and that he saw Yago with the Colonel and the head of CROC. As one of the other opposition lawyers heads to the office to testify, a car attempts to run him down in front of a crowd of witnesses.

With a large amount of corroborating evidence, the magistrate plans to charge high-ranking military officers and, upon learning of this plan, the country's attorney general arrives and criticizes his plans, arguing that they will harm the nation. He suggests that the magistrate try Yago and Vago apart, leave the issue of the police to be solved internally, and indict the opposition for inflammatory speech, but he follows through with his plans. The General denies any affiliation with CROC, but the magistrate presents a photo of a banquet he hosted in their honor. The action of the film concludes with one of the deputy's associates rushing to see his widow to give her the surprising news of the officers' indictments, to which she looks distressed.

An epilogue provides a synopsis of the subsequent turns of events. Instead of justice being served, the prosecutor is mysteriously removed from the case, several key witnesses die under suspicious circumstances, the assassins receive relatively short sentences, the officers receive only administrative reprimands, the deputy's close associates die or are deported and the photojournalist is sent to prison for disclosing official documents. The heads of the government resign after public disapproval, but before elections are carried out, a coup d'état occurs, and the military seize power. They ban modern art, popular music, avant-garde novelists, modern mathematics, classic and modern philosophers and the use of the letter "Ζ" (Greek: zíta, or Greek: zi, which is used by protesters against the former government), which refers to the deputy and means "He lives."

== Cast ==
- Jean-Louis Trintignant as The Examining Magistrate (based on Christos Sartzetakis)
- Yves Montand as The Deputy (Grigoris Lambrakis)
- Irene Papas as Helene (Roula Lambrakis – the Deputy's wife)
- Pierre Dux as The General (Konstantinos Mitsou)
- Jacques Perrin as Photojournalist (composite character, partly based on Giorgos Bertsos)
- Charles Denner as Manuel (Manolis Glezos)
- François Périer as The Public Prosecutor
- Georges Géret as Nick
- Bernard Fresson as Matt
- Marcel Bozzuffi as Vago (Emmanouel Emmannouilidis – man who struck Lambrakis)
- Julien Guiomar as The Colonel (Efthimios Kamoutsis)
- Magali Noël as Nick's sister
- Renato Salvatori as Yago (Spyro Gotzamanis – the driver)
- Clotilde Joano as Shoula
- Maurice Baquet as The Mason (Manolis Hatziapostolou)
- Gérard Darrieu as Barone
- Jean Bouise as Georges Pirou
- Jean-Pierre Miquel as Pierre
- Van Doude as The Hospital Director
- Jean Dasté as Ilya Coste
- Jean-François Gobbi as Jimmy, the boxer
- Guy Mairesse as Dumas
- Andrée Tainsy as Nick's mother
- Eva Simonet as Niki
- Hassan El-Hassani as a military officer
- Sid Ahmed Agoumi as The General's driver

Uncredited

- Raoul Coutard as the English Surgeon
- Françoise Bonnot (voice) as closing voiceover

== Background ==
The 1963 murder of Greek politician and physician Grigoris Lambrakis and subsequent military junta in power from 1967–1973 served as the basis for the story. Among Costa-Gavras' references to the actual events was the frequency with which the military compared ideologies to diseases, seen when the General compares -isms to mildew. The opening scene with the speech of the Deputy Minister of Agriculture is based on the real speech of Panagiotis Stavropoulos held in the Ministry of Northern Greece hours before the assassination. The Magistrate was based on real-life Greek jurist Christos Sartzetakis. Costa-Gavras opted to show the Deputy had adulteries and conflicts with his wife to demonstrate he was simply a man.

Costa-Gavras was also motivated by the suspicious disappearance of Mehdi Ben Barka in 1965. Some American viewers infer parallels between the film and the assassination of John F. Kennedy, particularly given how some stylistic elements seem to mimic the Zapruder film. That said, Costa-Gavras has stated that the Zapruder film had not been widely circulated in Europe at the time and that Kennedy's assassination did not influence the production.

== Production ==
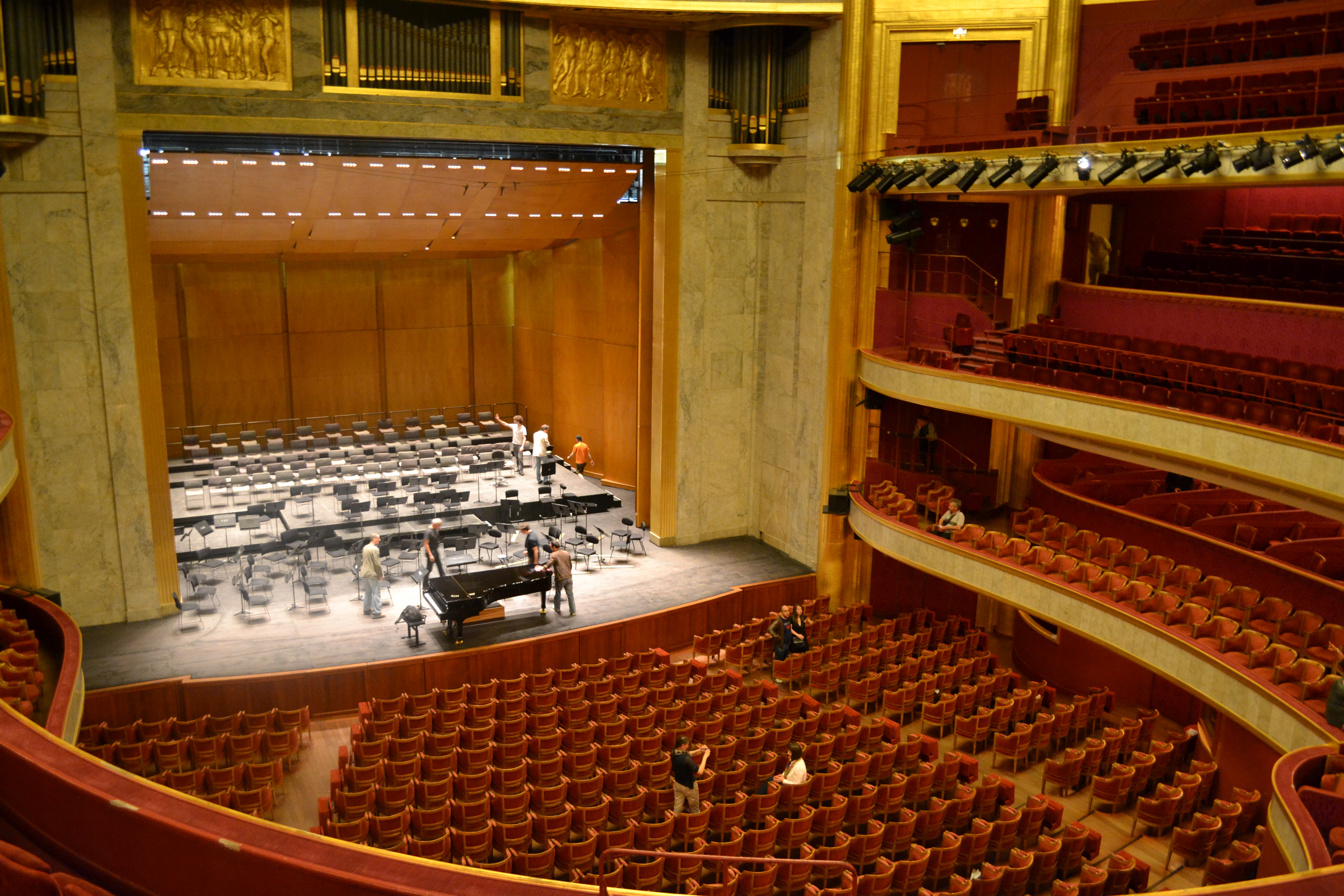
Ballet scenes were shot at the Théâtre des Champs-Élysées in Paris

Principal photography took place in Algiers at actor Jacques Perrin's suggestion, which the filmmakers approved for its Mediterranean environment and because the Ministry of Culture was accommodating. In Algiers, the Hotel St. Georges and the central square were filming locations, while Paris' Théâtre des Champs-Élysées was used for the ballet scenes. Marcel Bozzuffi performed his own stunts wrestling on the "Kamikaze" vehicle due to the production's lack of budget for professional stunt performers.

Costa-Gavras chose Z as the title of the film based on its common occurrence in Greek graffiti for "He lives" (or even "Lambrakis you live; it’s you who guides us!" [Λαμπράκη ζεις, εσύ μας οδηγείς!; Lambráki zis, esý mas odigís!]); Costa-Gavras acknowledged a one-letter film title was unconventional and said Yves Montand expressed concern it would be confused with Zorro, but Costa-Gavras said the novelty of the idea won him over.

== Soundtrack ==
The soundtrack by Mikis Theodorakis was a hit record. The Greek junta had placed the composer under house arrest but he was able to give his approval to Costa-Gavras for the use of existing musical pieces.

The film features, but does not credit, Pierre Henry's contemporary hit song "Psyché Rock". The soundtrack as released on LP and CD replaces Henry's song with a similar track written by Theodorakis titled "Café Rock."

1. Main Title (Antonis) from the "Mauthausen Trilogy" of Mikis Theodorakis
2. The Smiling Youth
3. The Chase-The Smiling Youth
4. Murmur of the Heart
5. Cafe Rock
6. Arrival of Helen-The Smiling Youth
7. Batucada
8. The Smiling Youth (Bouzouki Version)
9. The Smiling Youth
10. Who's Not Talking About Easter
11. Finale-The Smiling Youth
12. Murmur of the Heart
13. In This Town

"The Smiling Youth" and "Who's Not Talking About Easter" were among the poems adapted from Brendan Behan's play The Hostage by Theodorakis in 1962. By referring to the Irish struggle against British rule rather than Greek realities, the poems offered a way to circumvent censorship in Greece and condemn Greece's post-war right-wing establishment. "The Smiling Youth" (το γελαστό παιδί) was also one of the nicknames of Lambrakis.

== Release ==
Z was picked up for U.S. distribution by the specialty company/New York City theatre chain Cinema 5.

== Reception ==
Prints of the film were acquired by the Black Panther Party and shown at underground screenings. An advance copy of the film was shown at the United Front Against Fascism conference in 1969.

It first aired on American television on ABC on 18 March 1974.

=== Critical response ===
At the time of release, Chicago Sun-Times film critic Roger Ebert, who named Z the best film of 1969, liked the screenplay and its message, and wrote: "[Z] is a film of our time. It is about how even moral victories are corrupted. It will make you weep and will make you angry. It will tear your guts out...When the Army junta staged its coup in 1967, the right-wing generals and the police chief were cleared of all charges and 'rehabilitated.' Those responsible for unmasking the assassination now became political criminals. These would seem to be completely political events, but the young director Costa-Gavras has told them in a style that is almost unbearably exciting. Z is at the same time a political cry of rage and a brilliant suspense thriller. It even ends in a chase: Not through the streets but through a maze of facts, alibis and official corruption."

In 2006, critic James Berardinelli wrote: "Z was the third feature film from Greek-born Costa-Gavras, but it is the movie that captured him to the world's attention, winning a Best Foreign Language Film Oscar. It introduced the director's signature approach of combining overt political messages with edge-of-the-seat tension." Jonathan Richards wrote in 2009: "It's hard to overstate the impact that this Oscar-winning procedural thriller had in 1969, on a world roiling in political activism, repression, and discord. In the U.S., the Vietnam War was on the front burner, the populace was passionately engaged, and the police riots outside the '68 Chicago Democratic Convention and the murder of Black Panther Fred Hampton were raw wounds. With this stylish, intense indictment of the assassination of a leftist political leader by a right-wing government cabal in his native Greece, director Costa-Gavras struck a nerve that resonated here and around the globe."

In 2009, Armond White praised the film and wrote: "Ending with a provocative, unorthodox tally of fascist clampdowns on freedom of expression and the arts, Costa-Gavras angles his exposé with a frightening coda that encapsulates the on-going political struggle. He avoids hippie optimism and foresees contemporary cynicism with a basic thriller device: a warning. Z carries the reverberations of that cultural shift from enlightenment to paranoia in each of its shrewdly devised tropes from common genres. Costa-Gavras expresses the tension and terror of political conspiracy that haunted the democratic and anti-war movements of the sixties—and still does."

On Rotten Tomatoes, the film has a 94% "fresh" score based on 51 reviews. The site's consensus states: "Powerfully effective, this anti-fascist political thriller stands out as both high-conscience melodrama and high-tempo action movie." Metacritic, which uses a weighted average, assigned the film a score of 86 out of 100, based on 19 critics, indicating "universal acclaim".

The film was voted in Time's list of "The 15 Best Political Films of All Time."

The film was selected to be screened in the Cannes Classics section of the 2015 Cannes Film Festival.

=== Box office ===
The film had a total of 3,952,913 admissions in France and was the 4th highest-grossing film of the year. It was also very popular in the United States grossing $17.3 million, being one of the top five highest-grossing non-English language films.

== Awards and nominations ==
Z was the second foreign-language film in Academy history to receive a nomination for Best Picture, after Grand Illusion. At the 27th Golden Globe Awards, its producers refused the award to protest the film's exclusion from the Best Motion Picture – Drama category.

Award	Date of ceremony	Category	Recipient(s)	Result	Ref(s)
Academy Awards	7 April 1970	Best Picture	Ahmed Rachedi and Jacques Perrin	Nominated	
Academy Awards	7 April 1970	Best Director	Costa-Gavras	Nominated	
Academy Awards	7 April 1970	Best Adapted Screenplay	Jorge Semprún and Costa-Gavras	Nominated	
Academy Awards	7 April 1970	Best Foreign Language Film	Algeria	Won	
Academy Awards	7 April 1970	Best Film Editing	Françoise Bonnot	Won	
BAFTA Awards	1970	Best Film	Costa-Gavras	Nominated	
BAFTA Awards	1970	Best Screenplay	Costa-Gavras, Jorge Semprun	Nominated	
BAFTA Awards	1970	Best Editing	Françoise Bonnot	Nominated	
BAFTA Awards	1970	Best Film Music	Mikis Theodorakis	Won	
BAFTA Awards	1970	United Nations Award	Costa-Gavras	Nominated	
Cannes Film Festival	8 – 23 May 1969	Jury Prize	Costa-Gavras	Won	
Cannes Film Festival	8 – 23 May 1969	Palme d'Or	Costa-Gavras	Nominated	
Cannes Film Festival	8 – 23 May 1969	Best Actor	Jean-Louis Trintignant	Won	
Directors Guild of America Award	1970	Best Director	Costa-Gavras	Nominated	
Golden Globes	2 February 1970	Best Foreign Language Film	Costa-Gavras	Won	
National Society of Film Critics	January 1970	Best Film	Costa-Gavras	Won	
New York Film Critics Circle	25 January 1970	Best Film	Costa-Gavras	Won	
New York Film Critics Circle	25 January 1970	Best Director	Costa-Gavras	Won	

== Legacy ==
Filmmakers Paul Greengrass and Aki Kaurismäki listed the film in their top 10 films of all time for the 2012 Sight and Sound poll and other films directors such as Michael Haneke, Paul Schrader and John Woo have listed it as one of their favorite films.

The French filmmaker Mathieu Kassovitz listed the film as influential to his work. The French filmmaker Rachid Bouchareb listed Z as an influence on his film Outside the Law.

It is regarded as one of American filmmaker Oliver Stone's favorite films that inspired his filmmaking. John Milius also cited the film as an influence.

The American filmmaker Steven Soderbergh listed Z as an inspiration on his film Traffic and stated that he "wanted to make it like [Costa-Gavras]'s Z".

The American filmmaker William Friedkin listed Z as one of his favorite films and mentioned the film's influence on him when directing his film The French Connection: "After I saw Z, I realized how I could shoot The French Connection. Because he [Costa-Gavras] shot Z like a documentary. It was a fiction film but it was made like it was actually happening. Like the camera didn't know what was gonna happen next. And that is an induced technique. It looks like he happened upon the scene and captured what was going on as you do in a documentary. My first films were documentaries too. So I understood what he was doing but I never thought you could do that in a feature at that time until I saw Z." As an homage, Friedkin cast actor Marcel Bozzuffi in a similar role.

The American actor and filmmaker Ben Affleck listed the film as an influence for his film Argo.

The movie provided the inspiration for the name of Z Magazine, now ZNetwork.

== See also ==
- List of submissions to the 42nd Academy Awards for Best Foreign Language Film
- List of Algerian submissions for the Academy Award for Best International Feature Film
