= Kerasitsa =

Village in Arcadia, Greece

Kerasitsa Κερασίτσα
- Community
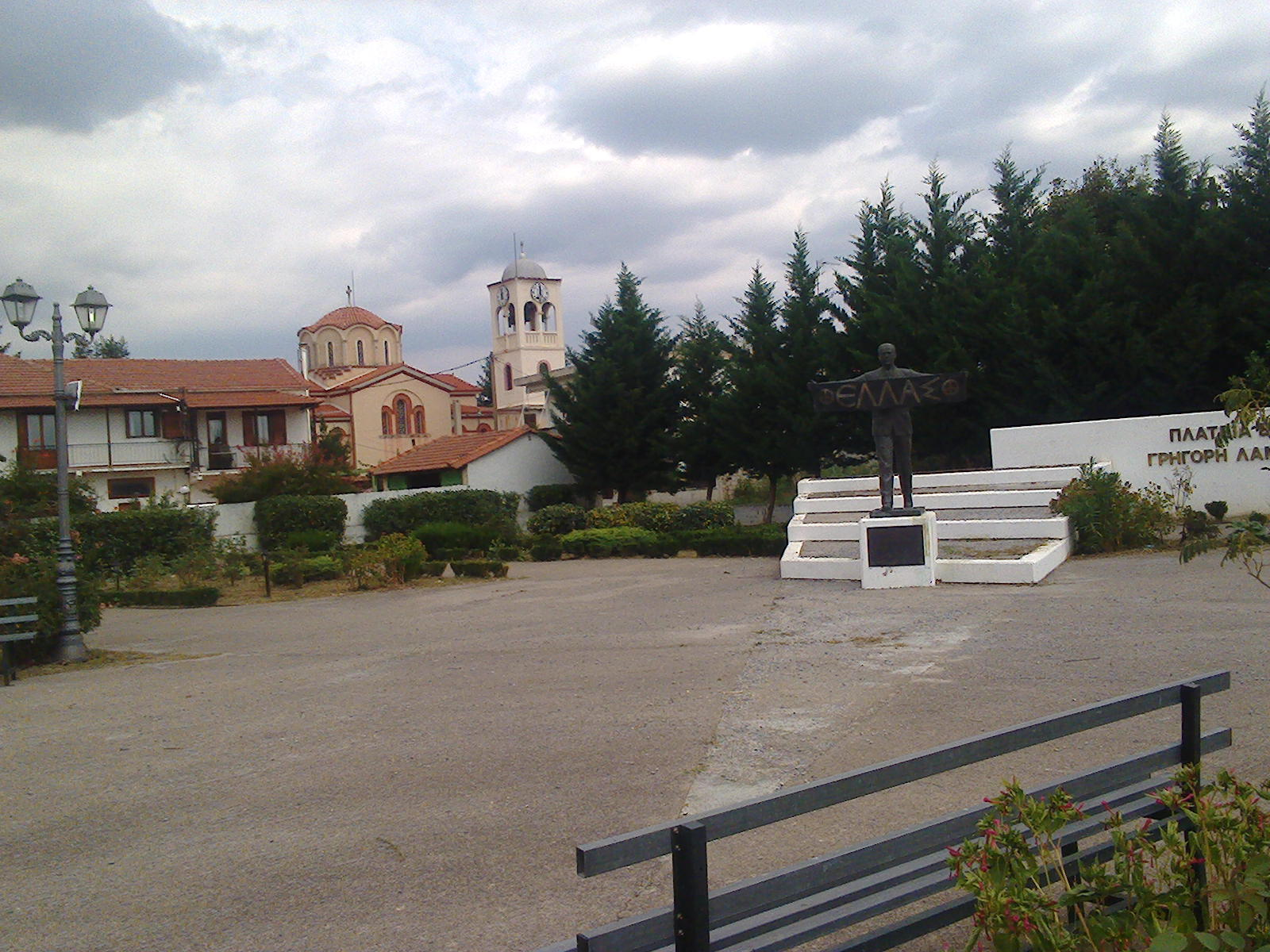

- Location within Greece
- Coordinates: 37°27′07″N 22°24′36″E
- Country: Greece
- Administrative region: Peloponnese
- Regional unit: Arcadia
- Municipality: Tripoli
- Municipal unit: Tegea
- Elevation: 669 m (2,195 ft)

Population (2021)
  - Community: 285
- Time zone: UTC+2 (EET)
  - Summer (DST): UTC+3 (EEST)
- Postal code: 220 12
- Area code: 271
- Vehicle registration: TP

Kerasitsa (Greek: Κερασίτσα) is a village in the municipal unit of Tegea in Arcadia, Greece. Its population was 669 in 2021. Its primary economic activities are agriculture and trade.

== Geography ==
Kerasitsa is built on the plain of Tegea at an altitude of 691 meters and is located 10 km south of Tripoli, the capital of the prefecture. Geographically, it lies within the boundaries of ancient Tegea. Furthermore, it is suggested that the Lefkonion spring, mentioned by the ancient traveler Pausanias, was located in the area of the modern village.

== Notable individuals ==
- Grigoris Lambrakis, politician
