= Apheidantes =

Apheidantes (Ancient Greek: Ἀφείδαντες) was a village in ancient Arcadia, in the territory of Tegea, and was the last established of the nine townships into which ancient Tegea was divided. It was founded in the reign of king Apheidas.

Its site is unlocated.
