= Gareatae =

Garea (Ancient Greek: Γαρεᾶ), also known as Gareatae or Gareatai (Γαρεᾶται), was a village in ancient Arcadia, in the territory of Tegea, and one of the nine townships into which ancient Tegea was divided.

Its site is unlocated.
