= Ananias of Lakedaemonia =

Martyred Greek cleric (died 1764)

Saint Ananias of Lakedaemonia

Ethnomartyr
- Born: 17th century or 18th century
- Died: April 1764; Mystras, Laconia, Peloponnese, Ottoman Greece
- Venerated in: Greek Orthodox Church
- Feast: 15 April

Saint Ananias Metropolitan of Lakedaemonia (17th or 18th century - April 1764), born as Anastasios Theofilis-Labardis, was a Greek cleric, metropolitan of Lacedaemonia and an ethno-martyr shortly before the Orlovian revolution.

He was born at the beginning of the 18th century in Dimitsana in the Peloponnese, taking the common name of Anastasios. His great-grandfather was the noble Stasinos of Akova, who came from the Palaiologos and married Kanella Lampardopoulou from the powerful Lampardis or Lampardopoulos family of Dimitsana.

His parents were the granddaughter of the noble Stasinos and Theofilis from Stemnitsa. Ananias was educated at the Filosofou Monastery and before 1741 he was appointed bishop of Karyoupolis in Mani.

In 1747 he took over as archbishop of Dimitsani, which was then an independent archdiocese. When in 1750 the metropolitan of Lacedaemonia Parthenios Kalimeris died, Ananias took over this diocese as well.

Ananias is said to have had a country house near the springs of Lucius, where he presumably went to communicate with his associates. In 1754 he renovated the metropolis of Mystras by building a new metropolitan building at his own expense, as can be seen from an inscription with the epigram below and the date 1754:

oukéti dómoi kai pýlai palaífatoi,
al' Ananíou tou nyn ierarchoúntos
kai apó váthron neósantos dapánais,
oútinos enenkoúsa teleí i Dimitsána.

== Death ==
Then the vizier of the Peloponnese was the mild-mannered Topal Osuman Pasha against whom other Turkish officials reacted who went to Constantinople and demanded his transfer. The Greek prerogatives sided with the vizier and five of them headed by Ananias also went to Constantinople in 1762.

Together with Ananias were Petros Deligiannis, an uncle of Asimakis Zaimis, Krevvatas (grandfather of Panagiotis Krevvatas) and an uncle of Panoutsos, notary public. They succeeded in keeping Topal Osuman Pasha in his position and the death sentence of the agades who moved against him, which revived the morale of the slaves.

But after two years, the cruel Hamza Pasha from Karysto was installed as vizier of the Peloponnese in his place, so the fanatical Turks found an opportunity to incriminate Ananias and the other four commissioners and cause the issuance of a secret firman that condemned them to death.

In 1764 Deligiannis, Zaimis, Krevvatas and Notaras were hanged who were found in the seat of the vizier in Tripoli, while Ananias was in Mystras. A body of 150 horsemen was sent against him, but Ananias was secretly notified by a special envoy. In the metropolis of Mystras, 20 Maniates and 10 Dimitsanites defended Ananias for 9 days until their supplies were exhausted.

Thus, after 12 were killed, the rest managed to escape while Ananias remained to suffer death. He prayed and received communion of the Immaculate Mysteries and was then beheaded in the temple or in his room.

The Turks brought his head to the vizier and his body was buried in Mystras. Along with Ananias, the dragoman he had, as Moragian (first tier of Kocabaṣı), was executed. These happened in April 1764.

After the execution of Ananias, the Turks turned against his relatives and other Christians in order to suppress the movement at his birth. Through the patriarchate they deposed Neophytos Deligiannis, ep. Zarnatas, whose father was Petros Deligiannis who was hanged earlier. The murder of Ananias and the lamentation of his sister Eugeniki, wife of Georgakis Filosofopoulos, is mentioned in the elementary school saved by T. Kandiloros:

Ekeí péra ki apópera ki apóxo apó ti chóra,
ekeí kathótan mia xanthí, xanthí kai mavromáta,
gýrous gyrízei ta floriá, gýrous margaritária.
- Gia vgál'ta Vgenikoúla mou, ta érma ta trisérma,
ti 'kópsan ton kyr-Ananiá kai to mitropolíti.

The Orthodox Church honors his memory as a saint on April 15.
