= Barony of Nikli =

Medieval territory in southern Greece

- Barony of the Principality of Achaea
- 1209–1296/1302
- Map of the Peloponnese with its principal locations during the late Middle Ages
- Capital: Nikli
- Area
  - Coordinates: 37°27′N 22°25′E
  - Type: Feudal lordship
- Historical era: Middle Ages
  - Established: 1209
  - Byzantine reconquest: 1296/1302
Succeeded by
Despotate of the Morea

The Barony of Nikli was a medieval Frankish fiefdom of the Principality of Achaea, located in the southern Arcadia region of the Peloponnese peninsula in Greece, and centred on the town of Nikli (Greek: Νίκλι; French: Nicles; Italian: Nicli), also known as Amyklai or Amyklion (Ἀμύκλαι, Αμύκλιον).

== History ==
The Barony of Nikli was established ca. 1209, after the conquest of the Peloponnese by the Crusaders, and was one of the original twelve secular baronies within the Principality of Achaea. The barony, with six knight's fiefs attached to it, was given to a lord known in the Greek and Italian versions of the Chronicle of the Morea only as William, but whose family name is given by Angevin records as Morlay. William was succeeded by his son Hugh—although Karl Hopf suggested the interposition of a second William after the original founder for chronological reasons—and then, around 1280, by Androuin de Villiers or de Villa, who had married Hugh's sister Sachette.

Nikli, known in Antiquity as Tegea, is located on the southern Arcadian plain and was conquered by the Franks after a siege sometime before 1209; at the time it was a town of some importance and the seat of a bishopric, which was taken over by a Latin bishop until 1222, when it was abolished and joined to that of Lacedaemon. Nikli's location made it an excellent assembly point for armies, as well as for parliaments like the famous "Ladies' Parliament" in 1261, but after 1262, when the Byzantines recovered parts of the southeastern Peloponnese, the barony became a battleground, and by the early 1270s, Nikli was permanently garrisoned to prevent the Byzantines from breaking out of their territory in Laconia into the central Arcadian plateau. Nikli was still in Frankish hands in 1280, but was lost to the resurgent Byzantines sometime after. The Aragonese version of the Chronicle states that the Byzantines occupied the town in 1296, but, it being indefensible on account of its location on the plain, they preferred to destroy and abandon it. The region seems to have remained under Frankish control for a few years after that, but by 1302, it was definitely in Byzantine hands.

== Sources ==
- Bon, Antoine (1969). La Morée franque. Recherches historiques, topographiques et archéologiques sur la principauté d'Achaïe [The Frankish Morea. Historical, Topographic and Archaeological Studies on the Principality of Achaea] (in French). Paris: De Boccard. OCLC 869621129.
- Miller, William (1921). Essays on the Latin Orient. Cambridge: Cambridge University Press. OCLC 457893641.
