= Potachidae =

Potachidae or Potachidai (Ancient Greek: Πωταχίδαι) was a village in ancient Arcadia, in the territory of Tegea, and one of the nine townships into which ancient Tegea was divided.

Its site is unlocated.
