= Konstantinos Mitsou =

Konstantinos Mitsou (Greek: Κωνσταντίνος Μήτσου; 1909 – 27 June 1985) was a Lieutenant General of the Hellenic Gendarmerie who served as General Inspector of Gendarmerie for Northern Greece in the early 1960s and was involved in many acts of political repression, most famously the assassination of left-wing Member of Parliament Grigoris Lambrakis in May 1963. His involvement in funding and directing various violent fascist organizations throughout Northern Greece, and especially Thessaloniki, was uncovered by examining magistrate Christos Sartzetakis and Mitsou was jailed, prompting the fall of the conservative Karamanlis government.

== Life ==
Konstantinos Mitsou was born in 1909 in the village of Halkiopoulo in Aetolia-Acarnania. His father, Vasilios Mitsou, was a wealthy and conservative farmer and landowner. Mitsou first served in the Hellenic Army as a sergeant of Infantry, but in 1932 he joined the Hellenic Gendarmerie.

From 1946 until 1949, he served in the VIP Security Directorate of the Gendarmerie, and was head of security for King Paul during his early reign.

From 1950 until 1953 he was commander of Gendarmerie for the Magnesia region, and from 1953 until 1955 commander of Gendarmerie for the Serres region, where he met and befriended future Prime Minister Konstantinos Karamanlis. He then served as Gendarmerie commander for the island of Crete (1955–58) and for the city of Thessaloniki (1958–61).

In July 1961 he was appointed General Inspector of Gendarmerie for Northern Greece, in charge of all Gendarmerie forces in the north of the country. In May 1963, after the assassination of Lambrakis, his role in supporting violent far-right groups was uncovered by examining magistrate Christos Sartzetakis. Mitsou and other senior officers of the gendarmerie were arrested over their involvement in politically-motivated crimes in September 1963. Under the Greek junta (1967-74) he was rehabilitated and permitted to retire honorably with a pension.

In 1985, Mitsou died in a car accident in Thessaloniki.

== Portrayal ==
Mitsou, played by French actor Pierre Dux, is the main antagonist in the celebrated Costa-Gavras political thriller Z, where he is only referred to as "the General". Many of Mitsou's traits, such as giving florid and dramatic speeches about the dangers of socialism and communism are heavily parodied in the film.
