= Echeuetheis =

Echeuetheis (Ancient Greek: Εχευήθεἱς) was a village in ancient Arcadia, in the territory of Tegea, and one of the nine townships into which ancient Tegea was divided.
