= Diocese of Amyclae =

Diocese in the Peloponnese, Greece (1082 - 1222)

The Diocese or Bishopric of Amyclae is a defunct Latin and Orthodox episcopal see and suppressed Latin Catholic titular bishopric in the Peloponnese, in peninsular Greece.

== History ==
The see of Amyclae dates to 1082, when the Bishopric of Lacedaemon was raised to the rank of a Metropolitan see, and authorized to form three suffragan sees at Amyclae, Pissa (probably encompassing Kynouria) and Ezeroi. Despite its name, the new bishopric was not located at ancient Amyclae, a town near Sparta, but rather on the site of ancient Tegea in Arcadia, which through some unclear process had received the name of Amyklion (later usually shortened to Amykli and Nikli) by the 10th century. The bishopric of Amyclae was thus regarded as the successor of the long-defunct see of Tegea, attested as late as the Fourth Ecumenical Council in 451, but later abandoned, like much of Arcadia, as a result of the Slavic incursions of the late 6th century. The only known bishop of the see's early period is Nicholas Mouzalon in the second half of the 12th century.

== Latin bishopric ==
Nikli and the rest of Arcadia were captured by the Crusaders in circa 1206–09, becoming part of the new Frankish Principality of Achaea, which soon came to encompass most of the Peloponnese. The Chronicle of the Morea depicts Nikli as a site of some importance and fortified, which fell to the Crusaders only after a siege.

It became the seat of a secular barony, while a Roman Catholic bishop was installed in the episcopal see: the bishop Gilbert of Amyclae is attested in an act of September 1209.

In 1222, the bishopric was united with the Metropolitan see of Lacedaemon.

=== Titular Latin see ===
It is a suppressed titular see of the Catholic Church, counting 18 incumbents between 1541 and the death of the last holder in 1937.

It has had the following incumbents, all of the lowest (episcopal) rank :

- Scipione Rebiba (1541.03.16 – 1551.10.12) as Auxiliary Bishop of Chieti (Italy) (1541.03.16 – 1551.10.12); later Bishop of Mottola (1551.10.12 – 1556.04.13), created Cardinal-Priest of S. Pudenziana (1556.01.24 – 1565.02.07), Metropolitan Archbishop of Pisa (Italy) (1556.04.13 – 1560.06.19), Bishop of Troia (Italy) (1560.06.19 – 1560.09.04), created Cardinal-Priest of S. Anastasia (1565.02.07 – 1566.10.07), Titular Latin Patriarch of Constantinople (1565.12.08 – 1573.04.08), Cardinal-Priest of S. Angelo in Pescheria (pro hac vice Title 1566.10.07 – 1570.07.03), Cardinal-Priest of S. Maria in Trastevere (1570.07.03 – 1573.04.08), promoted Cardinal-Bishop of Albano (1573.04.08 – 1574.05.05), Cardinal-Bishop of Sabina (1574.05.05 – 1577.07.23)
- Archbishop Pietro Vico (1635.09.17 – 1641) as Coadjutor Archbishop of Oristano (Italy) (1635.09.17 – 1641), succeeded as Metropolitan Archbishop of Oristano (1641 – 1657.08.27), later Metropolitan Archbishop of Cagliari (Sardinia, Italy) (1657.08.27 – 1676.10.19)
- Bishop-elect Francisco Ocampo, Military Order of Saint James of the Sword (O.S.) (1660.06.21 – ?), never held episcopal office
- Franz Christoph Rinck von Balderstein (1684.05.15 – 1707.05.06)
- Johann Kasimir Röls (1708.03.12 – 1715.02.08)
- Joseph Anton Reichfreiherr von Delmestri von Schönberg (1718.05.11 – 1720.04.23)
- Francisco Sánchez Márquez (1720.05.27 – 1728.09)
- Johann Ferdinand Joseph von Boedigkeim (1730.11.22 – 1756.04.28)
- Emmanuel Ernst Reichsgraf von Waldstein (1756.05.23 – 1760.01.28)
- Albert-Simon d’Aigneville de Millancourt (1760.09.22 – 1793.10.26)
- Jean-Baptist-Marie-Anne-Antoine de Latil (1816.03.08 – 1817.10.01), later Bishop of Chartres (France) (1817.10.01 – 1824.07.12), Metropolitan Archbishop of Reims (France) (1824.07.12 – 1839.12.01), created Cardinal-Priest of S. Sisto (1829.05.21 – 1839.12.01)
- Thomas Weld (1826.05.23 – 1830.03.15), as Coadjutor Bishop of Kingston (Canada) (1826.05.23 – 1830.03.13 not possessed); later created Cardinal-Priest of S. Marcello (1830.07.05 – 1837.04.10)
- Francesco Gentilini (later Archbishop) (1832.09.15 – 1833.04.15)
- Bishop-elect Antonio Herrán y Zaldúa (1834.01.20 – 1855.01.21) later Metropolitan Archbishop of Santafé en Nueva Granada (Colombia) (1855.01.21 – 1868.02.06)
- William Weathers (1872.09.27 – 1895.03.04)
- Patrick Foley (1896.03.18 – 1897.12.19)
- Patrick Fenton (1904.04.16 – 1918.08.22)
- Franciscus Hubertus Schraven (文致和), Lazarists (C.M.) (1920.12.16 – 1937.10.10)

== Orthodox see ==
Nikli was still in Frankish hands in 1280, but was lost to the resurgent Byzantines by 1302. With the progressive Byzantine recovery of much of the Peloponnese in the late 13th and early 14th centuries, the Orthodox clergy was reinstated in many of its former sees, and new ones were founded; thus in the mid-14th century, Amyclae was once more made a bishopric, again as a suffragan of the Metropolis of Lacedaemonia. The Orthodox see continued in existence thereafter: in 1562 it is recorded as the first-ranked (protothronos) among the suffragans of Lacedaemon.

In the aftermath of the Orlov Revolt and the invasion of the Peloponnese by Albanian irregulars, its bishop, Cyril, fled to Zakynthos and thence (along with the bishops of Lacedaemon and Monemvasia and other refugees) aboard four Russian warships to the Crimea.

In 1804, the see of Amyclae was united with that of Tripolitsa into the Bishopric of Amyclae and Tripolitsa, with the bishop Nikephoros of Amyclae assuming the new see.

In May 1817, the see was elevated to the rank of a Metropolis, and in 1819, the bishopric of Olena was merged into it.

Following the establishment of the independent Kingdom of Greece and the autocephaly of the Church of Greece in 1833, it became the Metropolis of Mantinea and Megalopolis.

== Sources and external links ==
- Bon, Antoine (1969). La Morée franque. Recherches historiques, topographiques et archéologiques sur la principauté d'Achaïe (in French). Paris: De Boccard.
- Gritsopoulos, Tasos (1939). "Η μετά της επισκοπής Αμυκλών ένωσις της πατριαρχικής εξαρχίας Τριπολιτζάς". Deltion of the Christian Archaeological Society (in Greek). 4: 108–117. Archived from the original on 2015-04-18.
- Konti, Voula (1985). "Συμβολή στην ιστορική γεωγραφία της Αρκαδίας (395-1209)". Byzantina Symmeikta (in Greek). 6: 91–124. doi:10.12681/byzsym.699.
- Zerlentis, Periklis G. (1921). Η μητρόπολις Αμυκλών και Τριπολιτσάς και αι επισκοπαί Πίσσης, Εζερών, Βελιγόστιδος (in Greek). Athens: Georgios I. Vasileiou.
- GCatholic, with titular incumbent biography links
