= Vassilis Vassilikos =

Greek writer and diplomat (1933–2023)

- Βασίλης Βασιλικός
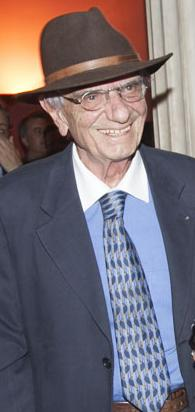
- Vassilikos in 2016

Member of the Hellenic Parliament for National list
- In office 7 July 2019 – 22 April 2023

Personal details
- Born: Vassilios N. Vassilikos; 18 November 1933 Kavala, Greece
- Died: 30 November 2023 (aged 90) Athens, Greece
- Resting place: First Cemetery of Athens
- Party: MeRA25 (2018–2019); SYRIZA (2019–2023)
- Spouse: Vasso Papantoniou (m. 1983)
- Children: Evridiki Vassilikou - Papantoniou
- Education: Anatolia College
- Alma mater: Aristotle University of Thessaloniki; Yale Drama School

Vassilis Vassilikos (Greek: Βασίλης Βασιλικός; 18 November 1933 – 30 November 2023) was a Greek writer and diplomat. According to UNESCO data, he is the 9th-most translated Modern Greek author.

== Biography ==
Vassilis Vassilikos was born in Kavala on 18 November 1933. His parents were from the island of Thasos. His father, Nikolaos Vassilikos, was a lawyer and MP for the Liberal Party. He finished high school in Kavala and then studied law at the Aristotle University of Thessaloniki. Afterwards, he studied television directing at Yale University's Drama School and moved to Athens to work as a journalist.

Because of his political activities, he was forced into exile for seven years following the coup of 1967. He continued to live and work abroad until his permanent return to Greece in 1994.

From 1981 to 1984, Vassilikos served as the deputy director of the Greek state television channel ERT. From 1996 to 2004, he served as Greece's ambassador to UNESCO.

Vassilikos was married twice. His first marriage was with a woman named Mimi, with whom he founded a publishing house. They later divorced because she became a nun. In 1983, he married a lyrical singer, Vasso Papantoniou (born 1939), with whom he had a daughter, Evridiki.

He died on 30 November 2023, at the age of 90. He was buried at the First Cemetery of Athens on 4 December. Vassilikos is survived by his wife and daughter.

== Work ==
Vassilikos published over 100 books, including novels, plays, and poetry. His best-known work is the political novel Z (1967), which has been translated into 32 languages and was the basis of the film Z, directed by Costa-Gavras. It was also the inspiration of the Indian film Shanghai (2012 film).

== Politics ==
Vassilikos ran in the 2014 Greek local elections as a PASOK candidate for counsellor in the city of Athens.

In the 2019 Greek legislative election, he was elected as a Member of Parliament with Syriza.

== Selected bibliography ==
- The Monarch
- And Dreams Are Dreams
- The Photographs
- The Plant, the Well, the Angel
- The Coroner's Assistant
- The Harpoon Gun
- The Few Things I Know About Glafkos Thrassakis
- Z (English language ISBN 0-394-72990-0 or ISBN 0-941423-50-6)

=== Translations ===
- The Photographs, tr. M. Edwards (1971; repr. 1972)
- The Plant, The Well, The Angel A Trilogy, tr. E. Keeley, M. Keeley (1964)
