= Phylace (Arcadia) =

Coordinates: 37°20′13″N 22°29′24″E

Phylace or Phylake (Ancient Greek: Φυλακή, Phylakē) was a town of ancient Arcadia, upon the frontiers of Tegea and Laconia, where the Alpheius rises.

Its site is located west of the modern Vourvoura.
