= Zygos Movement =

The Zygos (Citizens') Movement (Greek: Κίνηση (Πολιτών) Ζυγού) is a political party which encourages problem solving by technically minded people such as engineers, scientists and doctors as opposed to lawyers and politicians.
