= Diocese of Lacedaemon =

Former diocese in Laconia, Greece and current Roman Catholic titular see

The Diocese of Lacedaemon or Lacedaemonia (Greek: Μητρόπολις Λακεδαίμονος/Λακεδαιμονίας) was a Christian ecclesiastical province in Laconia, Greece. Extant from at least the middle of the 5th century, it became a metropolis in 1083. During the period of Frankish rule, between ca. 1209 and 1278, it was held by Roman Catholic prelates, and remains a (vacant) titular see of the Catholic Church. The Greek Orthodox see was restored with the Byzantine reconquest in the 1270s, and continued until the see's abolition in 1852.

== History ==
=== Establishment and first Byzantine period ===
Christianity came to Laconia and its capital, Sparta, in the 1st century AD, with the first church mentioned in Sparta in ca. 150 AD. Like the rest of the Peloponnese, the Christian community of Sparta was under the jurisdiction of the See of Corinth. A certain Hosios is the first bishop of Sparta attested, in 458; the see was called Lacedaemon, which was the common name for both Sparta and its surrounding region in Byzantine times.

The Chronicle of Monemvasia claims that the inhabitants of Sparta left their city for Sicily due to the Slavic invasions of the late 6th century, and that it was not until the early years of the 9th century that Emperor Nikephoros I (reigned 802–811) rebuilt the city and resettled it with Greek and Armenians settlers. Nevertheless, in the Sixth Ecumenical Council of 681, a Theodosios, "bishop of the city of the Lacedaemonians", participated, and a bishopric of "Lakedeon" is attested in a Notitia Episcopatuum of ca. 800.

With the raising of the Bishopric of Patras to a metropolitan see in 806, Lacedaemon (along with the bishoprics of Methoni and Koroni) passed from Corinth to Patras; Lacedaemon assuming the first rank (protothronos) among the suffragans of Patras. In 869–870, the bishop of Lacedaemon was Theokletos, who participated in the ecumenical council convened by Patriarch Ignatios. His successor, Antony, participated in the council of 879–880 convened by Patriarch Photios. Little is known of the ecclesiastical history of the region thereafter until the arrival of Saint Nikon the Metanoeite in the last three decades of the 10th century. His hagiography gives many, albeit not always reliable, information about the area, including the existence of a Jewish community and still pagan Slavs, on whom Nikon focused his missionary activity.

On 1 January 1083, or thereabouts, the bishopric of Lacedaemon was raised to the rank of a metropolis; its bishop, Theodosios, becoming the first metropolitan. The new metropolis counted three suffragans: Amyclae, Pissa, and of the Ezeroi.

=== Frankish and second Byzantine periods ===
Following the Fourth Crusade, most of the Peloponnese was taken over by Frankish Crusaders and became the Principality of Achaea; Lacedaemon itself was occupied, apparently without much resistance, shortly after 1209, as it is not mentioned in the Treaty of Sapienza signed on June that year. In their conquests, the Crusaders retained the existing Greek Orthodox ecclesiastical structure but installed Roman Catholic prelates. Due to the scarcity of the Catholic element but also the few higher clergy available, in 1222–23 several smaller sees, which had had a rather theoretical existence under Frankish rule or were never even occupied after the eviction of their Orthodox bishops, were abolished and amalgamated into the larger ones: thus in 1222, Amyclae was joined with Lacedaemon, followed in 1223 by the see of Helos, which had lain vacant after the Frankish conquest.

Lacedaemon experienced a period of splendour in the mid-13th century, when Prince William II of Villehardouin made it his residence, and began constructing the fortress of Mistra nearby. After the re-establishment of a Byzantine presence in Laconia and the start of warfare between the Byzantines and the Achaeans in 1263, however, most of the inhabitants fled to Mistra. Between 1270 and 1272, Lacedaemon fell to the Byzantines, and in 1278, the last Catholic bishop, Aimon, was moved to the see of Koroni. At the same time, his restored Orthodox counterpart took up his residence in Mistra. Lacedaemon remains a titular see of the Catholic Church, counting 18 holders from 1514 on. It has been vacant since 1967.

Despite the restoration of Byzantine rule, the see remained vacant or was given to other prelates several times during the second Byzantine period. Thus after 1272, the see was held by the metropolitan of Monemvasia, while in 1289 it was given to the distinguished scholar and exiled Metropolitan of Crete (a Venetian possession), Nikephoros Moschopoulos. In 1316 Lacedaemon was united with the see of Patras, which remained under Frankish rule, and given the bishopric of Kernitsa as its sole suffragan. This lasted until the middle of the century, when the Metropolis of Patras was again separated (and installed at the Mega Spilaion Monastery), while Lacedaemon received Amyclae as its suffragan. The cultural and spiritual revival experienced by the Byzantine Despotate of the Morea led to an increase in the construction of churches and monasteries, especially in the Despotate's capital, Mistra.

During the chaotic last years of the Despotate of the Morea, the see of Lacedaemon appears to have been vacant; the last known Metropolitan of Lacedaemon was Methodios, who participated in the Council of Florence in 1436. After 1450 the see appears to have been administered by the scholar and priest John Eugenikos (brother of Markos Eugenikos) as its commissary.

=== Ottoman period ===
The Despotate of the Morea passed under Ottoman control in 1460, marking the start of the slow decline of Mistra. The history of the Metropolis of Lacedaemon during the first century of Ottoman rule is obscure: the first named Metropolitan, Jeremias, is not attested until 1541–46, and then he did not reside in his see but rather was a permanent member of the synod of the Patriarchate of Constantinople. This pattern of absence is largely followed by the few prelates known to have presided over the see in the next decades. The most important among them was Theodosios, who held the metropolitan throne from 1575 to 1592.

In 1601, the Athenian Ezekiel was elected as metropolitan, but died soon after, to be succeeded by the former Great Protosyncellus of the Patriarchate of Constantinople, Chrysanthos Laskaris. From the time of Chrysanthos and his immediate successors, Dionysios, Joasaph and Gabriel, the metropolitans once more began to reside in their see, although most of their time was often spent at the patriarchal court in Constantinople. Following the Venetian conquest of the Peloponnese in the mid-1680s, the peninsula remained under Venetian rule for thirty years, until the Ottoman reconquest in 1715. The Venetian period saw a brief revival of a Catholic hierarchy in the Peloponnese alongside the Orthodox one, which the Venetian authorities tried to control by attempting, with little success, to impose their own appointees for the Orthodox episcopal sees.

Following the restoration of Ottoman rule, in 1764, the metropolitan Ananias Theofilis-Lampardis was decapitated by the Turks in front of his cathedral in Mistra, for plotting against Turkish rule. A few years later, after the failed Orlov Revolt, the Peloponnese suffered from the raids of the Albanian irregulars invited by the Turks to help suppress the rebellion. In February 1777, the then metropolitan of Lacedaemon, Neophytos, was killed by the Albanians. During the late Ottoman period, the diocese of Lacedaemon counted three suffragans: the bishoprics of Vresthene, Karyoupolis and Maltzine.

=== Modern period ===
At the time of the outbreak of the Greek War of Independence in March 1821, the incumbent metropolitan Chrysanthos was old and near-blind, but a leading role in the initial days of the revolt was played by the bishop of Vresthena, Theodoretos II, who was a member of the Filiki Etaireia and served as deputy chairman of the Peloponnesian Senate. Chrysanthos died in 1823, and the metropolitan see was administered by Daniel Kouloufekis, Bishop of Charioupolis, as locum tenens. Following the establishment of the independent Kingdom of Greece and the declaration of the autocephaly of the Church of Greece, in November 1833 the Church hierarchy was reorganized to match the new administrative boundaries. Daniel Kouloufekis was formally installed as the metropolitan, and the Metropolitan of Lacedaemon became the senior see of the entire Laconia Prefecture, with seven suffragans: Sellasia (former Bishopric of Vresthene), Epidavros Limira (former Metropolis of Monemvasia), Gytheio, Asini (former Bishopric of Lageia), Oitylo, Zygos, and Kardamyli. Gradually, over the next few years, several of the suffragan sees were merged into the metropolitan see, beginning with Kardamyli (1834), Oitylo, Epidavros, and Zygos (1841), Gytheio (1842), and Asini (1852). In 1837 furthermore, the seat of the metropolis was moved from Mistra to the modern town of Sparti. As a result of the merger with Epidavros, the heir to the ancient see of Monemvasia, the Metropolitan of Lacedaemon acquired the title "Exarch of the Peloponnese" and the appellation "All-Holiness", granted to the Metropolitan of Monemvasia in 1301.

With the death of Daniel Kouloufekis in December 1844, the see remained vacant and was governed by a committee until 9 April 1852, when the ecclesiastical hierarchy was once more reorganized. Laconia was divided among three sees: the Bishopric of Gytheio, the Bishopric of Oitylo, and the new Archbishopric of Monemvasia and Sparta, which replaced the Metropolis of Lacedaemon.

== List of bishops and metropolitans ==
- Theodosios (ca. 681)
- John I (after 843)
- Pithanos or Pothinos
- Irenaeus
- Basil
- Saint Theokletos (ca. 869)
- Antony (ca. 879–880)
- Basileus (ca. 900)
- Nikephoros
- Eustathios
- Leontios
- John II
- Theodoretos (ca. 960/970)
- Theopemptos of Athens (ca. 998)
- Theodosios II
- Luke
- John III
- Theodosios III (ca. 1082/83, first metropolitan)
- Michael
- Soterichos
- Basil
- John IV
- John V the Monk
- Niketas (ca. 1166)
- John VI (ca. 1173–77)
- Niketas (ca. 1200)
- Theodosios IV (ca. 1272)
- John VII (ca. 1285)
- Nikephoros Moschopoulos (1289 – at least 1315/6)
- Gregory Boutas (ca. 1324)

== Sources ==
- Bon, Antoine (1969). La Morée franque. Recherches historiques, topographiques et archéologiques sur la principauté d'Achaïe [The Frankish Morea. Historical, Topographic and Archaeological Studies on the Principality of Achaea] (in French). Paris: De Boccard.
- Gregory, Timothy E.; Ševčenko, Nancy Patterson (1991). "Lakedaimon". In Kazhdan, Alexander (ed.). The Oxford Dictionary of Byzantium. Oxford and New York: Oxford University Press. pp. 1169–1170. ISBN 0-19-504652-8.
- Laurent, Vitalien (1961). "La liste épiscopale du synodicon de la métropole de Lacédémone". Revue des études byzantines (in French). 19: 208–226. doi:10.3406/rebyz.1961.1256.
- Laurent, Vitalien (1963). "La date de l'érection des métropoles de Patras et de Lacédémone". Revue des études byzantines (in French). 21: 136–139. doi:10.3406/rebyz.1963.1303.
