= Phylace (Epirus) =

Phylace or Phylake (Ancient Greek: Φυλακή, Phylakē) was a town of Molossia, in ancient Epirus, of uncertain site.
