= Theatre of Algeria =

The theatre of Algeria began to flourish in the early 20th century, As in the rest of the Arab world, Algeria has long had theatrical forms of expression such as the storytellers’ performances in the Khalqa shows, or those of the Meddahs. Other forms include short sketches performed during pilgrimages or the traditional shadow theatre.

There has been debate among scholars as to whether these forms influenced the development of modern Algerian theatre – some viewing them as proto-theatrical expressions, while others rejected this idea as Western-centric or even ethnocentric.

Among the best-known playwrights, the first to use the Halqa structure as a scenographic element and to employ the Meddah style was Kadour Naimi. Later, Abdelkader Alloula and Kateb Yacine explicitly stated their intent to integrate the Halqa and Meddah traditions into their own works.

Early pioneers such as Allalou and Rachid Ksentini succeeded in popularizing the Western classical form in Algerian Arabic (Darja) after earlier failures of performances in Classical Arabic. They drew heavily from the traditional storyteller techniques.

== Origins ==
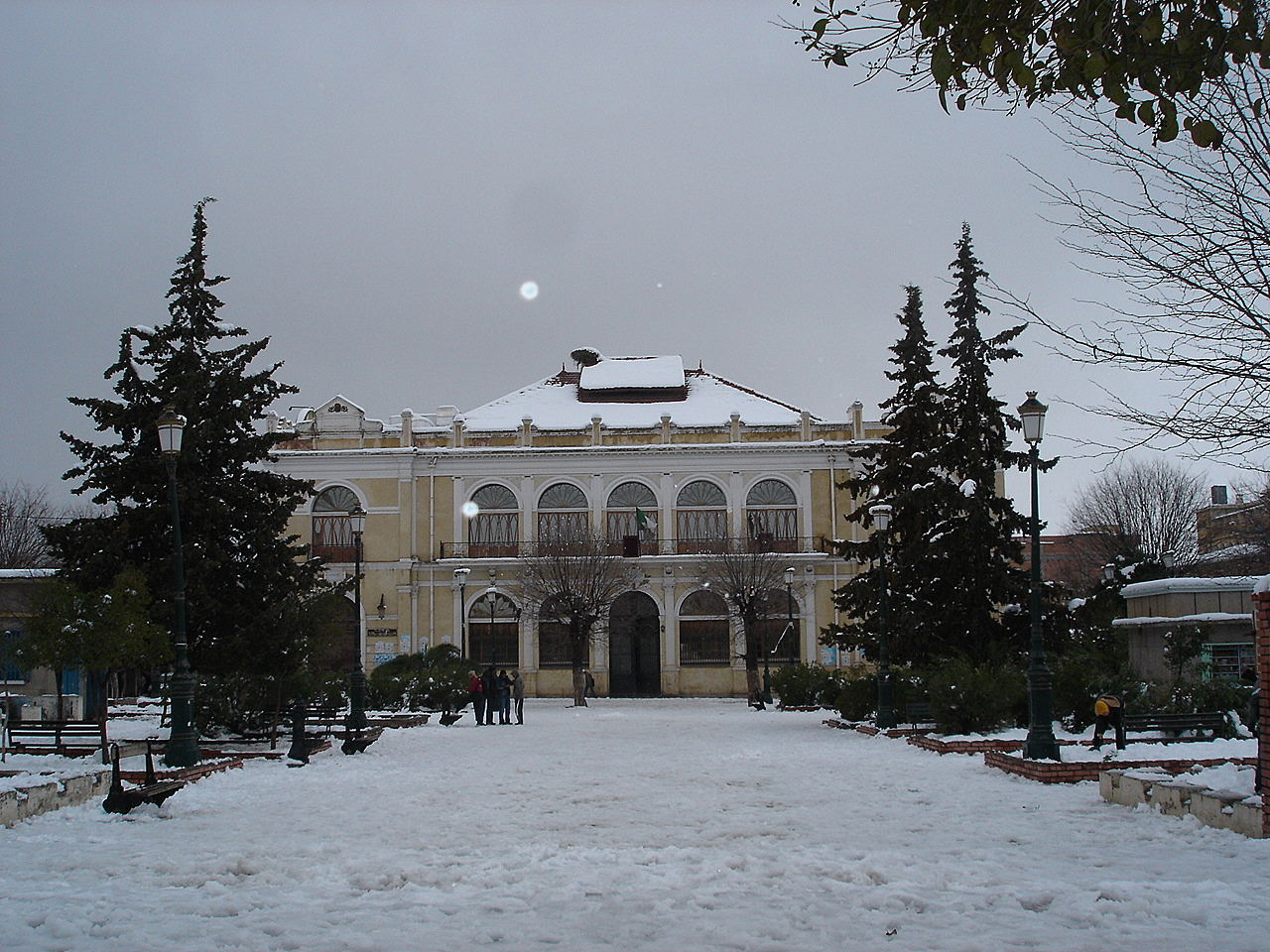
Regional Theatre of Batna

It was originally itinerant poets and storytellers, known as Meddah or Guwâl, performing in public squares to raise funds for their pilgrimage to Mecca, who gave rise to the early profession of acting.

On the eve of the First World War, various characters appeared in short sketches and Garagouz puppet shows, gradually forming a repertoire performed during weddings, circumcisions, and religious pilgrimages at Zawiyyas, accompanied by music inaugurating these celebrations.

Religious brotherhoods also performed during such ceremonies, notably the Issawa brotherhood, which became known throughout the Maghreb for its spectacular ritual dances. Western-style theatre genres such as boulevard and vaudeville, introduced during the colonial period, influenced Algerian theatre pioneers like Rachid Ksentini (1887–1944), Mahieddine Bachtarzi (1897–1986), and Allalou (1902–1992), the latter originally a religious singer. Students from the madrasas also played a key role in this emergence.

The first play published in Arabic was written by Algerian author Abraham Daninos (1797–1872) in 1847 – an original creation rather than a European adaptation.

According to Mahboub Stambouli, the first performance took place in 1910. Early Algerian plays at that time had little influence, largely due to colonial censorship that feared subversive topics. Consequently, domestic and moral themes dominated, though they reflected little of the true socio-cultural realities of Algerians.

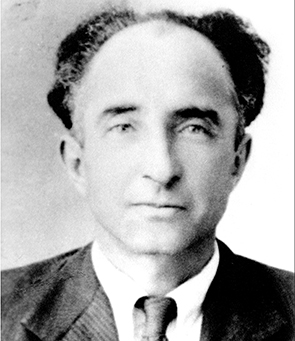
Rachid Ksentini (1887–1944)

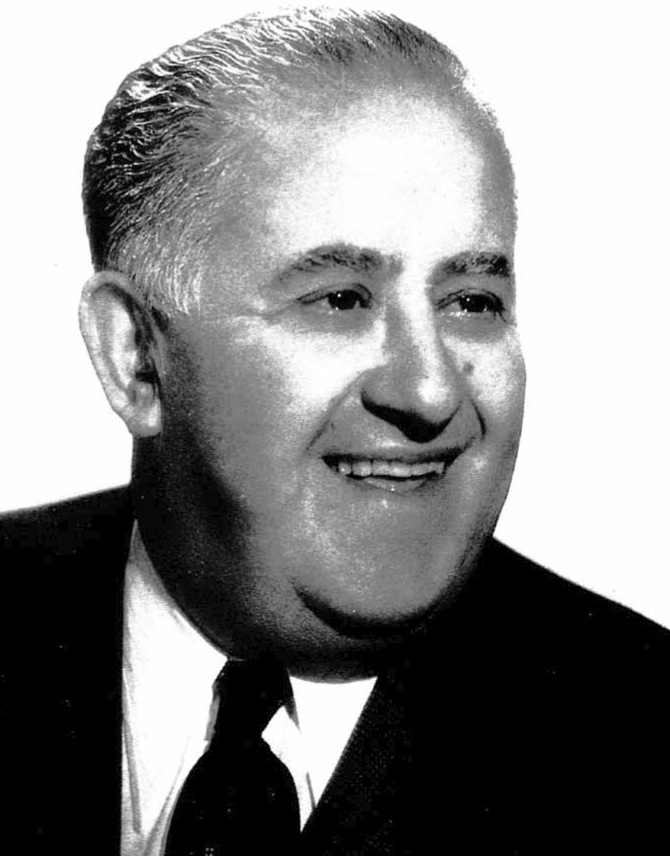
Mahieddine Bachtarzi (1897–1986)

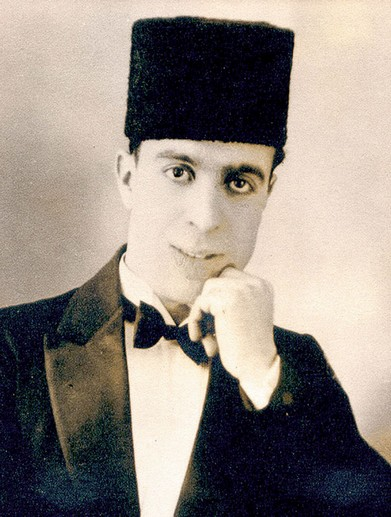
Allalou (1902–1992)

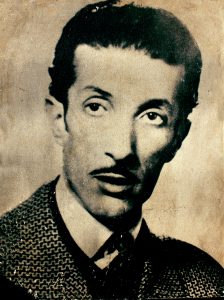
Mohamed Touri (1914–1959)

== The language question ==
In 1921, Lebanese–Egyptian actor Georges Abiad toured North Africa with two plays written and performed in Classical Arabic: Salaheddine El-Ayyubi (based on The Talisman by Walter Scott) and Th'ratu-l'Arab (based on The Last of the Abencerrages by François-René de Chateaubriand), both adapted by Najib El-Haddad.

While the tour had success in Tunisia and elsewhere, it failed in Algeria, where the majority of the Muslim population spoke only colloquial Arabic, not Classical Arabic.

Despite this, the period's intellectual activity fostered projects for theatre in Classical Arabic, such as Badî by Ali-Chérif Tahar, staged in 1924 in Algiers’ New Theatre. However, none achieved success with a general audience unfamiliar with both theatre and the classical language.

At the same time, in colonial Algeria, theatre began to emerge as a medium for political expression – for instance, the play Fi Sabil El-Watan (For the Homeland), produced independently in December 1922, was promptly banned by the authorities.

== Early development ==
In 1926, actors Allalou and Dahmoun made a decisive step in establishing a truly Algerian theatre language. Inspired by the popular folk character Djeha, they created a play in April 1926 using the Casbah dialect, addressing themes such as forced marriage and the influence of marabouts. The success of this performance helped spread theatre across the country, despite religious opposition – notably from the Association of Algerian Ulema.

Some critics, however, considered dialectal Arabic unsuitable for "noble" theatre. Despite this, its use continued to grow. In 1946, Mustapha Kateb (1920–1989) from Souk Ahras founded a municipal Arabic troupe at the Algiers Opera.

By the 1940s, major names emerged — Mahieddine Bachtarzi, Rachid Ksentini, Djelloul Bachdjerrah (1908–1971), and Aïcha Adjouri (known as Keltoum) (1916–2010). These figures formed the first nucleus of Algerian dramatists who later supported the Algerian War of Independence, when theatrical troupes toured internationally to promote the Algerian struggle against colonial rule.

By 1930, female actors such as Marie Soussan and Keltoum were already performing on stage.

== After independence ==
After independence, Algerian theatre followed a path parallel to cinema but remained more openly critical of political, social, and cultural transformations. Plays by dramatists such as Kadour Naimi, Kateb Yacine, and others addressed the main concerns of postcolonial Algerian society.

A new generation of actors and playwrights appeared, including Abdelkader Alloula, Allel Mouhib, Hadj Smaine, Abderrahmane Kaki (1934–1995), Med Seghir, Azeddine Madjoubi, Benguettaf, and Slimane Benaïssa. Their productions were numerous and often of high artistic quality.

This new wave continued the legacy of Allalou, Bachtarzi, and Ksentini, forming numerous collectives aiming to promote an authentic Algerian theatrical culture despite colonial influence. Playwrights such as Abdelkader Alloula sought to create semi-professional, autonomous troupes.

Mohamed Boudia, under the Ministry of Education, founded the TNA (Théâtre National Algérien) and became its first director, nationalizing theatres with the goal of creating a universal Algerian theatre.

Algeria currently has a national theatre, seven regional theatres, and numerous amateur troupes.

== Notable people ==
=== 20th century ===
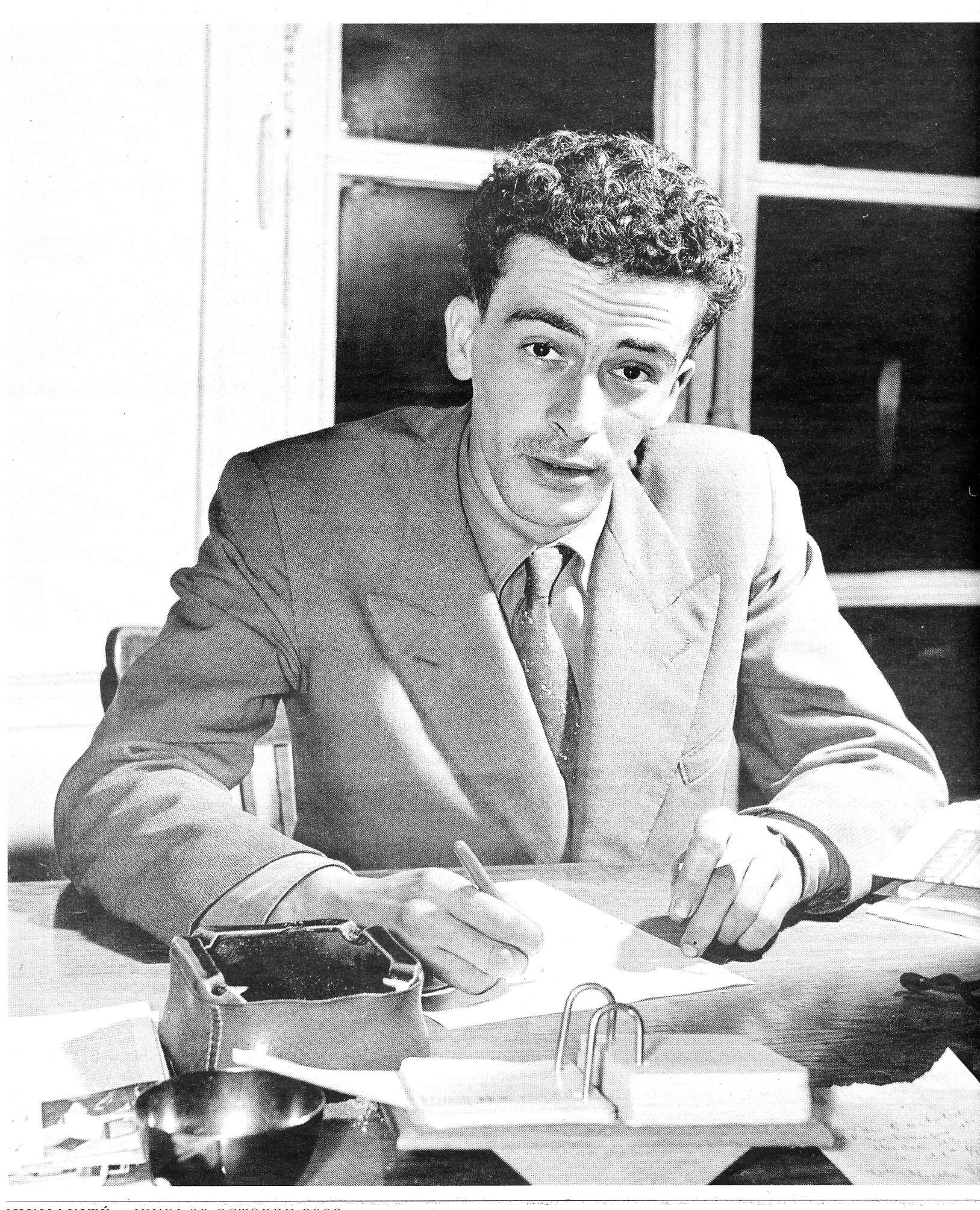
Kateb Yacine (1929–1989)

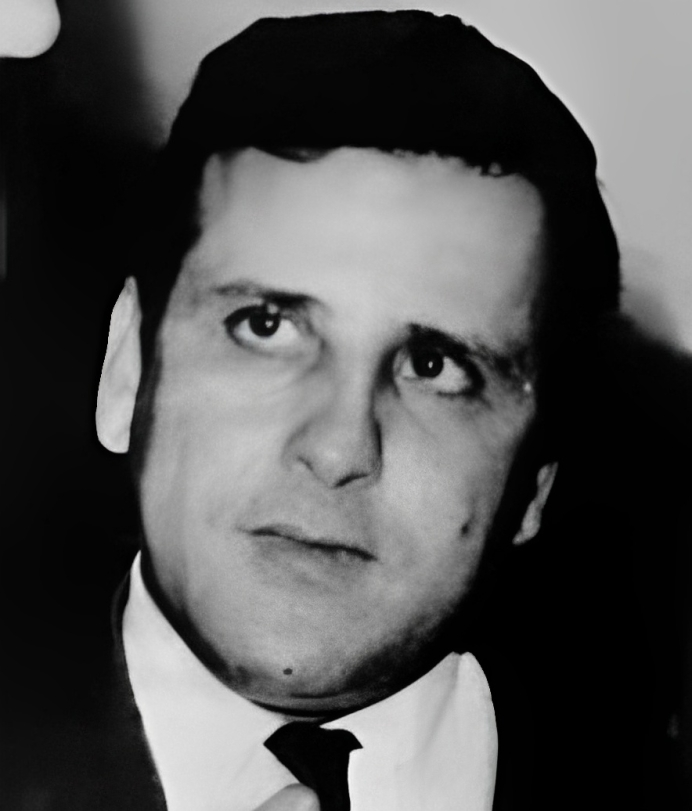
Mohamed Boudia (1932–1973)

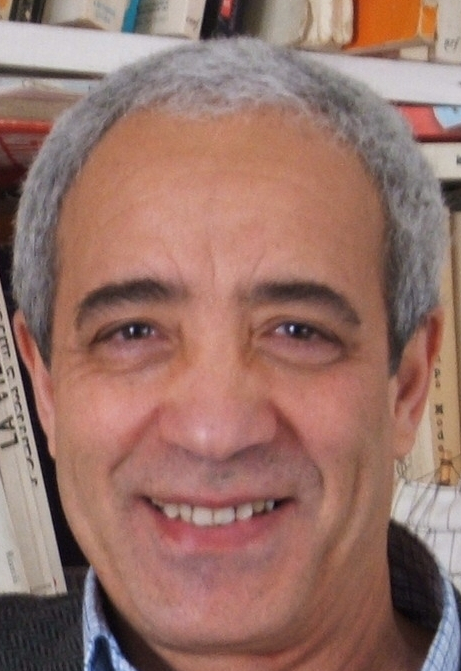
Kadour Naimi (1945–)

=== 21st century ===
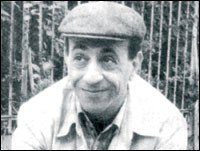
Abdellah Mohya (1950–2004)

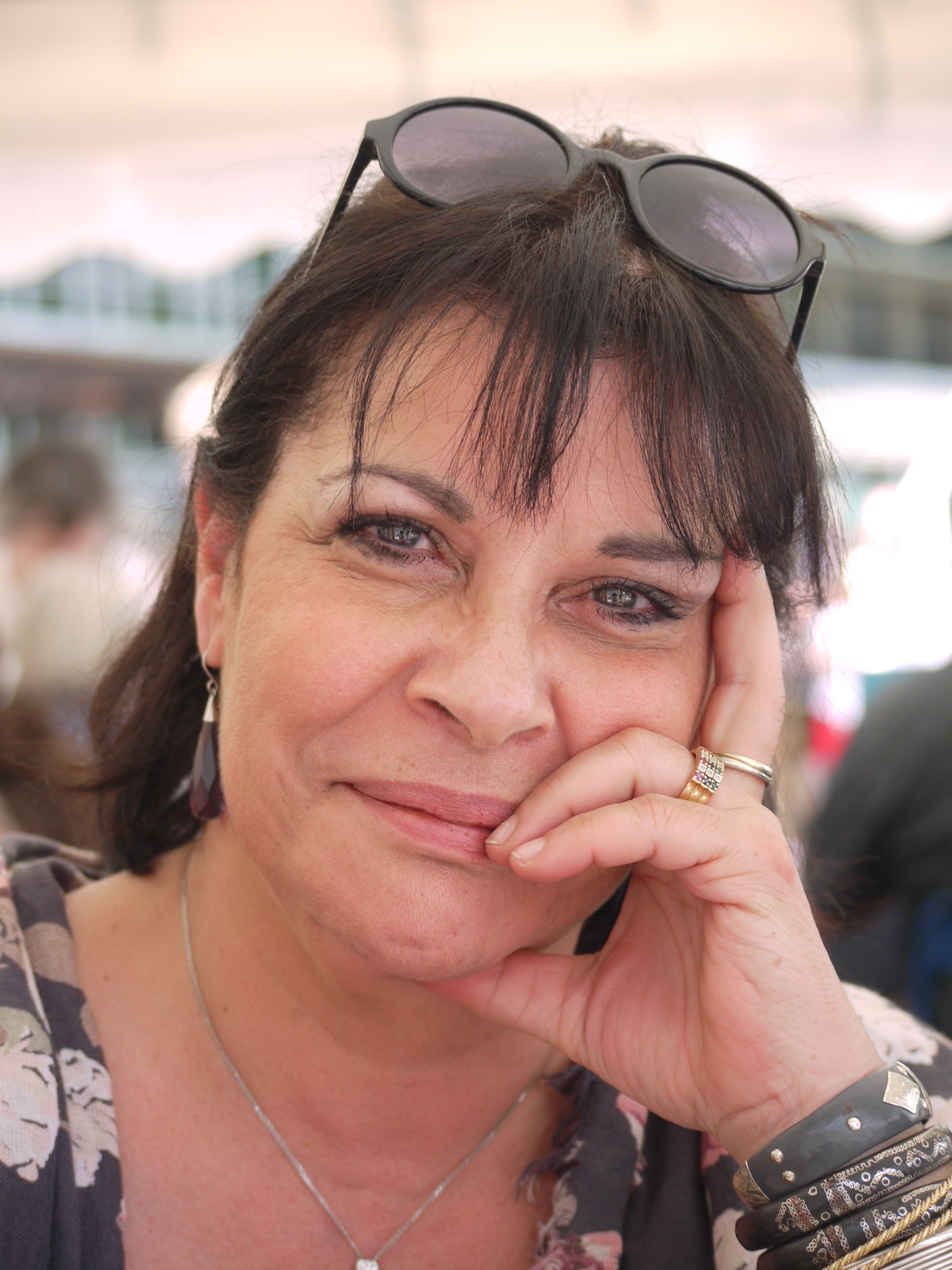
Maïssa Bey (1950–)

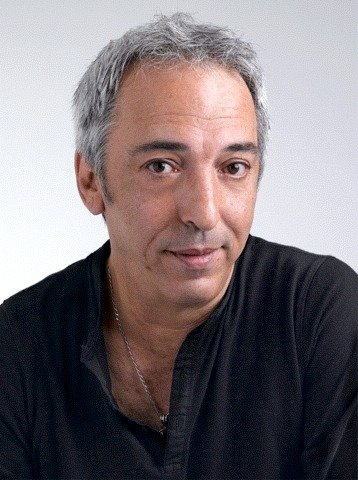
Aziz Chouaki (1951–)

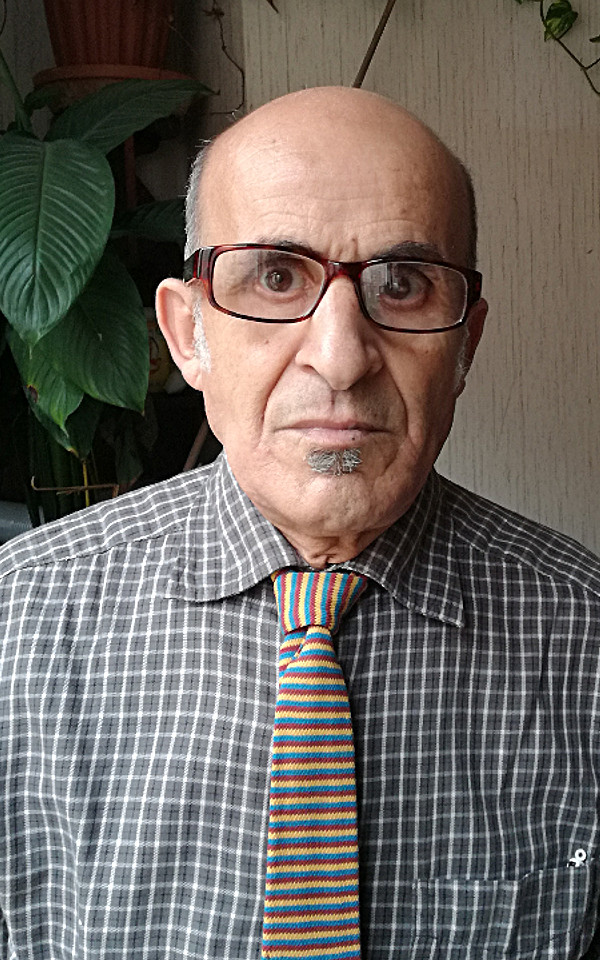
N. E. Tatem (1956–)

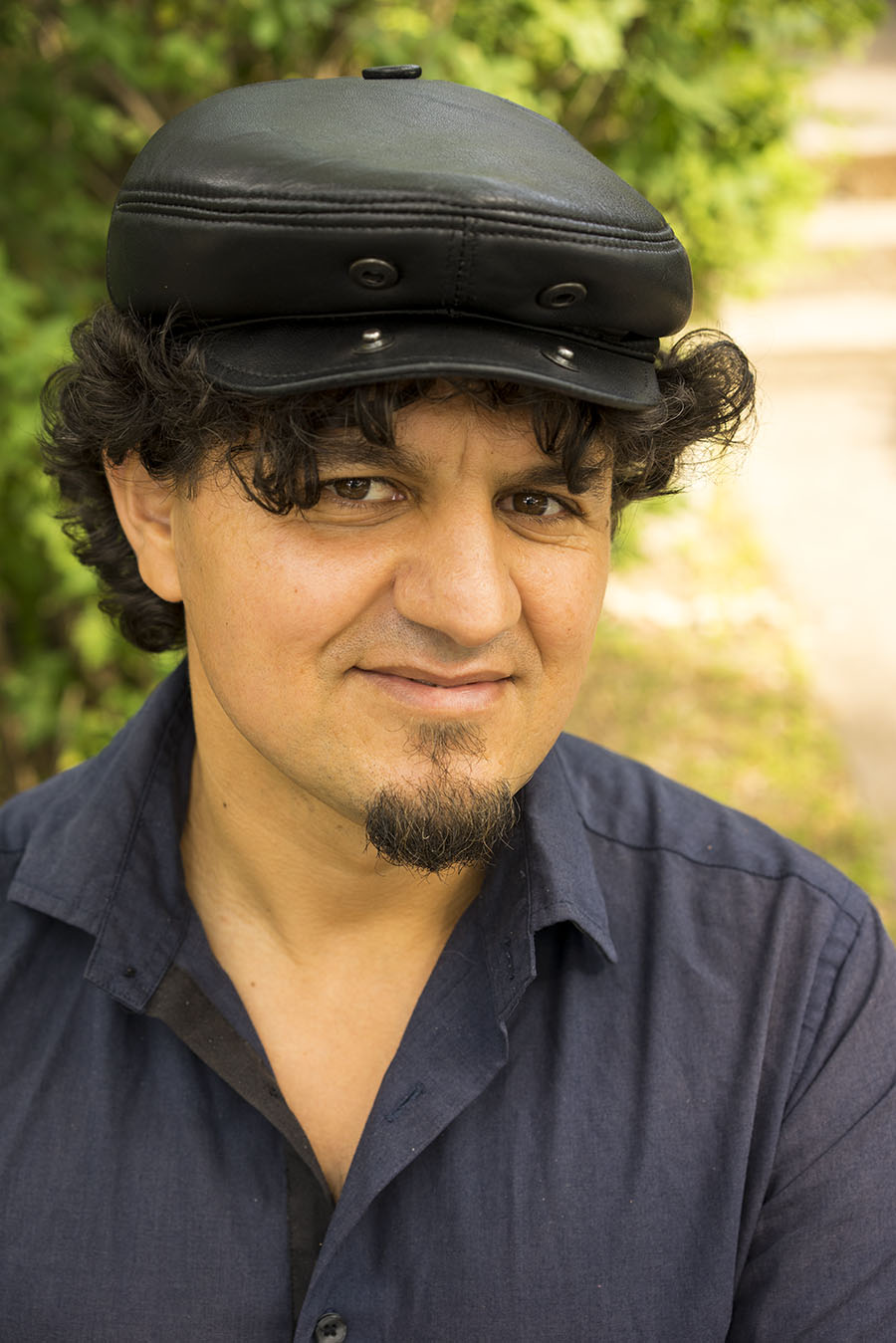
Karim Akouche (1978–)

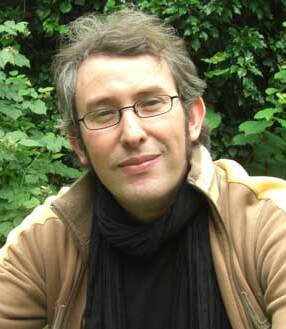
Mustapha Benfodil (1968–)

== See also ==
- Garagouz (puppet theatre)
- Algerianism
- Algerian literature
- African theatre
