= Mustapha Preure =

Algerian actor (1935–2022)

- مصطفى برور
- Born: 1935; Casbah of Algiers, Algiers, Algeria
- Died: 12 February 2022; Algiers, Algeria
- Citizenship: Algerian
- Occupations: Actor, comedian, host, production manager (television/radio)
- Notable work: Le Clandestin; La Dernière Image; Lumières

Mustapha Preure (in Arabic مصطفى برور) (1935 – 12 February 2022) was an Algerian actor, comedian, and radio and television presenter. Active in theatre, cinema, and broadcasting, he also worked as a production manager for Algerian national television and radio.

== Biography ==
Mustapha Preure was born in 1935 in the Casbah of Algiers. He began his artistic activities at a young age, notably at the Sarrouy School in Soustara, and took part in early youth performances. He later became a well-known figure in Algeria's cultural scene, contributing to the Algerian National Theatre, radio programs, and television productions, often working behind the camera as a production manager.

== Filmography ==
=== Selected filmography ===
Year	Title	Role / Notes	Source
1978	Hassan Terro au Maquis	Role attributed (anti-colonial film)	
1986	La Dernière Image	Actor (credited)	
1987	Les Portes du silence	Actor (cast)	
1989	Le Clandestin (film, 1989)	Actor	
1989	Lumières	Actor	

=== Notes on filmography ===
Mustapha Preure appeared in "over 80 films, including around fifty television productions and several dozen radio plays."

== Awards and recognition ==
Various press articles and tributes at the time of his death described him as a "dean" and a major figure of Algerian theatre and television.

== Legacy ==
Africultures and several Algerian media outlets highlighted his prolific career, particularly his radio and theatre work, emphasizing its enduring impact on Algeria's cultural memory.

== See also ==
- Theatre of Algeria
- Cinema of Algeria
