= Kadour Naimi =

Algerian film producer and playwright

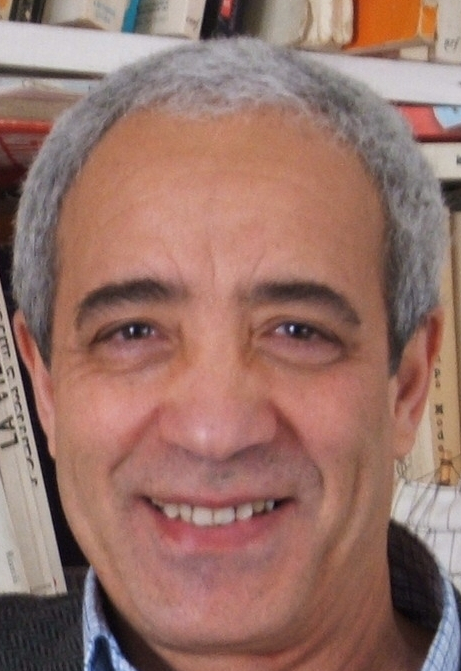
- Kadour Naimi in 2009
- Born: 4 November 1945 (age 80); Sidi Bel Abbès
- Citizenship: Algeria
- Education: University of Oran, Université catholique de Louvain
- Occupations: film producer, playwright, filmmaker, and writer

Kadour Naimi (or Kaddour Naïmi; Arabic: قدور نعيمي; born November 4, 1945, in Sidi Bel Abbès, Algeria) is a film producer, playwright, filmmaker, and writer.

== Biography ==
Naimi is the son of a shoemaker father and a housewife mother. He graduated from a double high school course in French and Arabic. After graduation, he attended the University of Oran from 1965 to 1966, where he earned a double certificate of general literary studies in French and Arabic. From 1966 to 1968, Naimi attended the École supérieure d'art dramatique de Strasbourg, which was then directed by Hubert Gignoux and Pierre Lefèvre, where he studied staging and dramaturgy. Back in Algeria, he became known in the theatrical field.

At the end of 1973, he immigrated to Belgium. From 1974 to 1979, in the Université catholique de Louvain, he obtained a degree in sociology, then, from 1979 to 1982, started a PhD in sociology of revolutions.

Interested in cinema, in 1982 he immigrated to Italy, acquired citizenship, and became involved in films, theater, and literature.

Since October 2016, he has regularly collaborated in newspapers and contributed sociological reviews, including to the French-language newspaper Le Matin d'Algérie.

In September 2018, he created Editions Electrons Libres, which offers free text or audio books, in electronic form in French, Italian, and Algerian Arabic.

== Theater ==
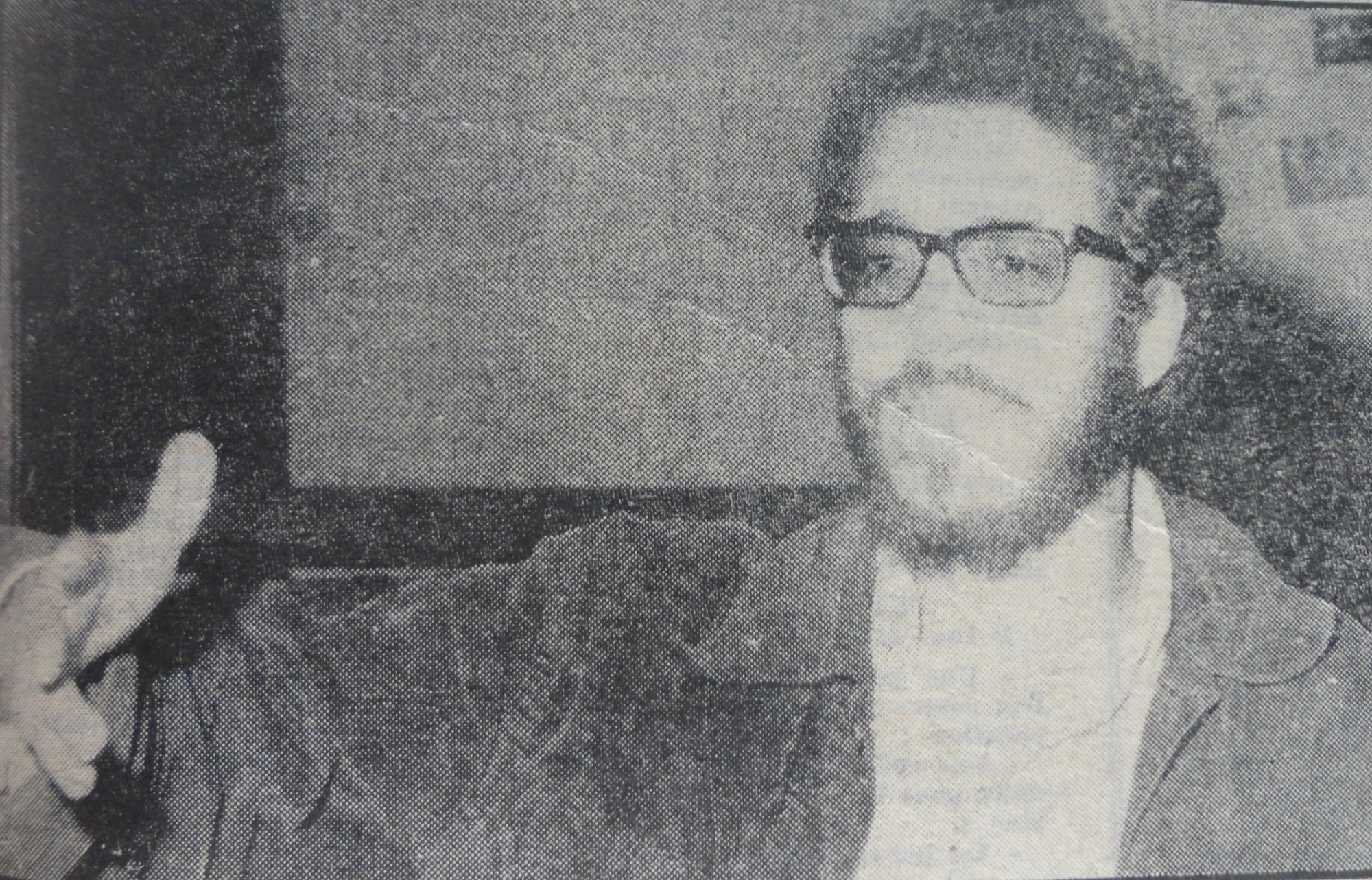
K. Naimi in 1968

In August 1968 in Oran (Algeria), Naimi created and directed the Théâtre de la mer : Compagnie de recherches et de réalisations théâtrales expérimentales (Theatre of the Sea: Research and Experimental Theatre Productions Company), whose work has been innovative in the context of Algerian culture, fostering independent production, ethical and political freedom, self-management, collective creation, research and experimentation, popular theatre, and staging performances in unconventional places (work and study places, or neighborhood squares).

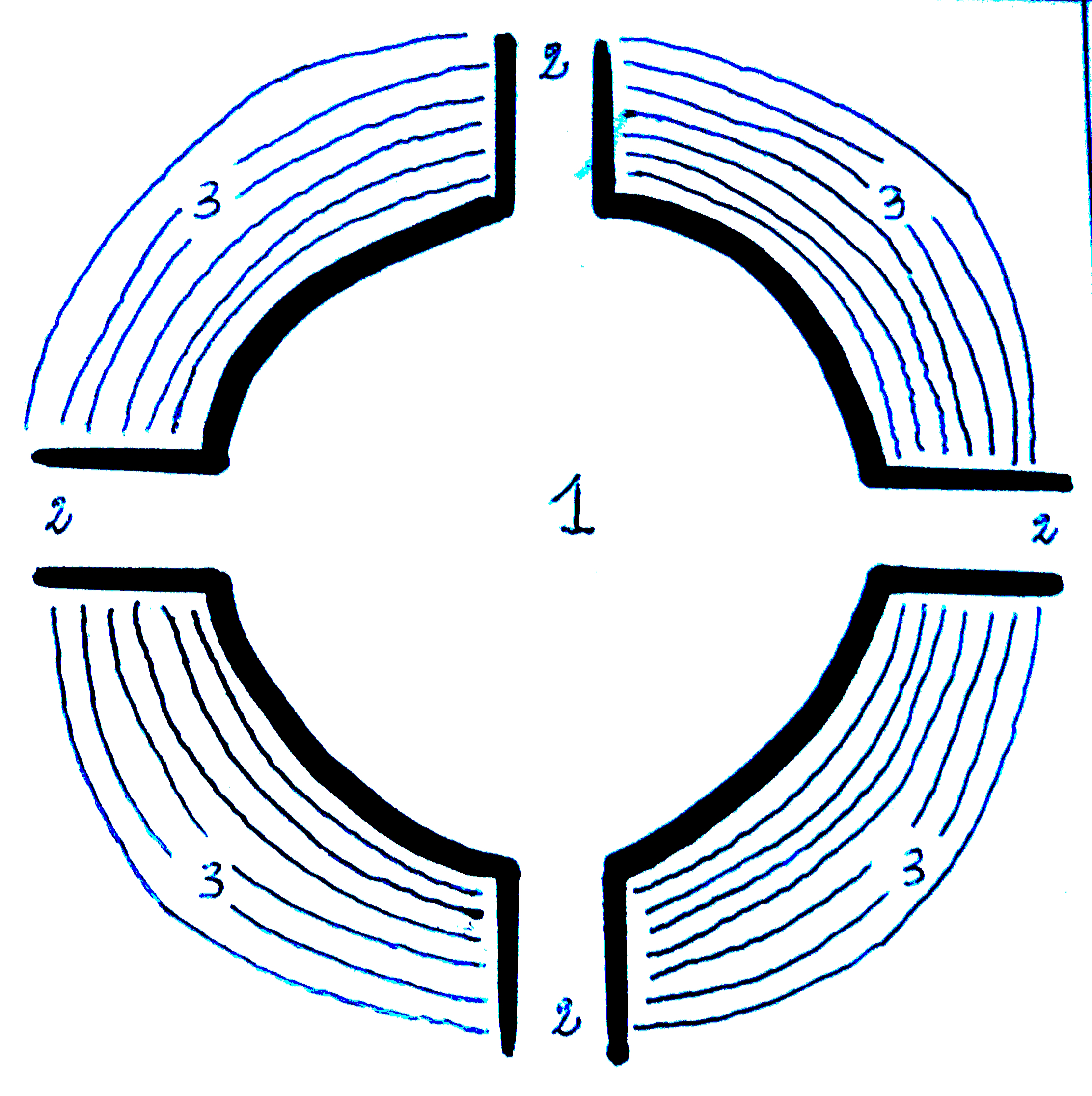

The staging of shows was patterned after the traditional Algerian rite of Halqa (Arabic: حلقة), with a central acting space in the round (1 in the drawing), entry and exit aisles for the actors (2), and the rest of the encircling space reserved for spectators(3). The works were presented in rural areas, to farmers who had never seen this kind of show. The public was urged to attend rehearsals and voice observations, and to interact during the performance, to be an integral part of the action

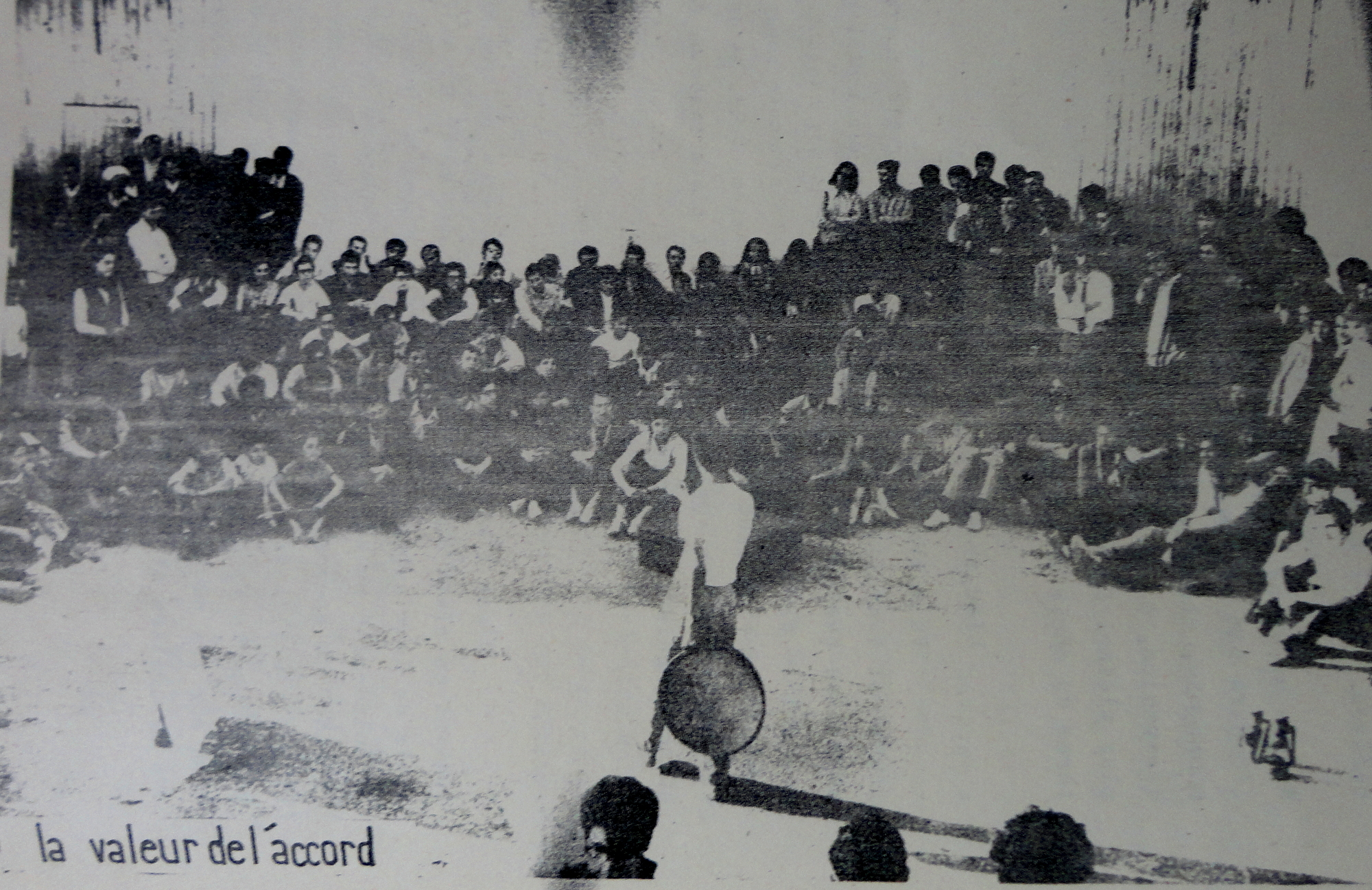
Circular performance of La Valeur de l'Accord on a farm, for farmers and students, 1969. K. Naimi, center, presents the show.

The theatrical writing is in the form of a screenplay and the performance is cinematic.

The press emphasized the originality of the innovations, and the impact produced on the public, of works such as Mon corps, ta voix et sa pensée (My body, your voice and his thought), La Valeur de l'Accord (The value of the Agreement), La Fourmi et l'Éléphant (The Ant and the Elephant), La tendresse, les enfants ! (The Tenderness, guys!). Abderrahmane Kaki expressed appreciation, as well as essayists and historians. In 1973, Et à l'aurore où est l'espoir ? (And at dawn where is the Hope ?) received the Research Prize at the International Festival of Hammamet (Tunisia). In 2012, the Algerian Ministry of Culture officially recognized the theatre for its production.

Some of Naimi's theatrical innovations have been influential with others. There are similarities between the theatre of Naimi and that produced by two men of Algerian theatre—Kateb Yacine, a playwright and director, and Abdelkader Alloula—in terms of collective creation, circular space, experimentation, variety of audiences and places of presentations, audience participation, decor and suggestion, body, voice, and mind, self-management, research, training, and the importance of Bertolt Brecht and Erwin Piscator.

Other works:

- Algeria (Tlemcen): Le Cireur (The shoeshine, 1965) – writing, directing and interpretation.
- Algeria (Béjaïa) – production of the International Festival of Theatre of Béjaïa: Alhanana, ya ouled ! (The Tenderness, guys!) – writing, choreography and direction.
- Algeria (Oran and Algiers) – works collectively produced and written in the Théâtre de la Mer (Theater of the Sea), founded and directed by Naimi: Mon corps, ta voix et sa pensée (My body, your voice and his thought, end of 1968), La Valeur de l'Accord (The Value of the Agreement, 1969) Forma – Révolu / tion (Form-Revolu/tion, 1970), La Fourmi et l'Éléphant (The ant and the Elephant, 1971), Mohamed, prends ta valise (Mohamed, take your bag, 1972), written collectively under the direction of Kateb Yacine. Because of disagreements with this author, Naimi resigned from the company.
- Tunisia (Hammamet): Et à l'aurore, où est l'espoir ? (And at dawn, where is the hope ?, 1973) production, directing and interpretation.
- France (Strasbourg): foundation of Ensemble théâtral du Tiers-Monde (Theater group of the Third-World, 1967), composed of students; Chant funèbre pour l'ennemi du genre humain (Dirge for the enemy of mankind, 1967) – production, writing, directing and interpretation; L'importance d'être d'accord (The Importance of the Agreement, 1968), by B. Brecht – adaptation, directing and interpretation.
- Belgium (Bruxelles): Palestine (Palestina, 1974) – production, writing, directing and interpretation.
- Italy: I Canti di Maldoror (Les Chants de Maldoror, 1984) – adaptation of the book of Lautréamont, production, choreography, and directing; Parto senza bagagli (I go without luggage, 1995), by F. Bagagli e M. Mirojrie; Anno Zero (Year Zero, 1996), – producing, writing, and directing.

== Film work ==
In 1986, in Rome, Naimi created the production and distribution company Maldoror Film, and directed it until its closure in September 2009. The company produced the films and documentaries of the filmmaker, excluding his first short film, made in 1981. He was involved in production, writing, shooting, lighting, editing, directing, and the making of theatre posters. Only exceptionally, did he have collaborators or co-producers.

Films include Marco detto Barabba (Marc called Barabbas), fiction (1981); Arancia blu (Blu Orange), documentary (1985), Anima near (Black Soul), documentary (1986), Festa a Villa Gordiani (Feast at Villa Gordiani), documentary (1989), Anno Zero (Year Zero), documentary (1990), Ieri, Oggi, Domani (Yesterday, Today, Tomorrow), documentary (1992); Maldoror, fiction, adaptation of the work Les Chants de Maldoror by Lautréamont (1997); Dove il Sogno diventà Realtà (Where the Dream becomes Reality), documentary (1999); Piazza del Mondo (Square World), documentary (2003); Jesce Sole : Frammenti di vite frammentate, (Rise up, Sun : Fragments of fragmented lives), fiction (2006); La réalisation de Alhanana, ya ouled ! (The realisation of The Tenderness, guys!), documentary (2012); 莺歌燕舞 (Yīng gē yàn wǔ – The Oriole sings, the Swallow dances), documentary, presented in September 2014 at the Portobello Film Festival in London.

These works were produced as independent, or even "guerrilla", cinema; with only private, but without institutional, financial support; and with a minimum crew. Films were shot digitally, with the exception of the first short film, Marco detto Barabba (Marco called Barabbas), shot on 16mm colour film. Films were presented mainly outside the commercial theatre circuit.

== Other work ==
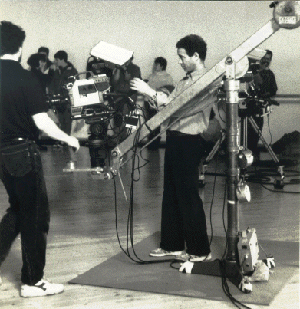
Kadour Naimi in 1995

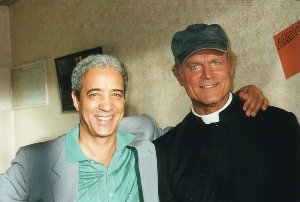
K. Naimi and Terence Hill during filming.

Also in 1986, and in Rome, Naimi established the School of Maldoror Film. He was its director, and taught there, until its closure in 2009. In 2006, in Rome, he created and directed the International Free Cinema Festival, which took place annually from 2006 to 2008. From January to June 1995, he presented and directed a weekly television broadcast on Tele-Lazio, entitled Cittadini del Mondo (Citizens of the World). The program presented Italian artists and intellectuals from other countries, being particularly sensitive to the international dimension and solidarity of their work with the public.

Naimi acted in several productions.

In theatre: Bilal (protagonist, 1964), Le cireur (The shoe polish, protagonist, 1965), Mon corps, ta voix et sa pensée (My body, your voice and his thought, co-protagonist, 1968), La Valeur de l'accord (The value of the Agreement, co-protagonist, 1969).

On television: Don Matteo, episode "Donne e buoi dai paesi tuoi" ("Women and oxen from your own", directed by Andrea Barzini, co-protagonist with Terence Hill, 2001), Butta la luna (Throw the moon, by Vittorio Sindoni, secondary character, 2006), and Capitano 2 (Captain 2, by Vittorio Sindoni, secondary character, 2007).

Cinema: La Poussette (The Stroller, by Aziz Benmahjoub, protagonist, 1974), Senza Parole (Without Words, by Antonnello De Leo, secondary character, 1995, film nominated for Best Live Action Short Film at the 69th Academy Awards in Los Angeles).

Radio : Le retour au désert (The Return to the Desert, by Bernard-Marie Koltès, directed by Elio De Capitani, 2004).

== Literature ==
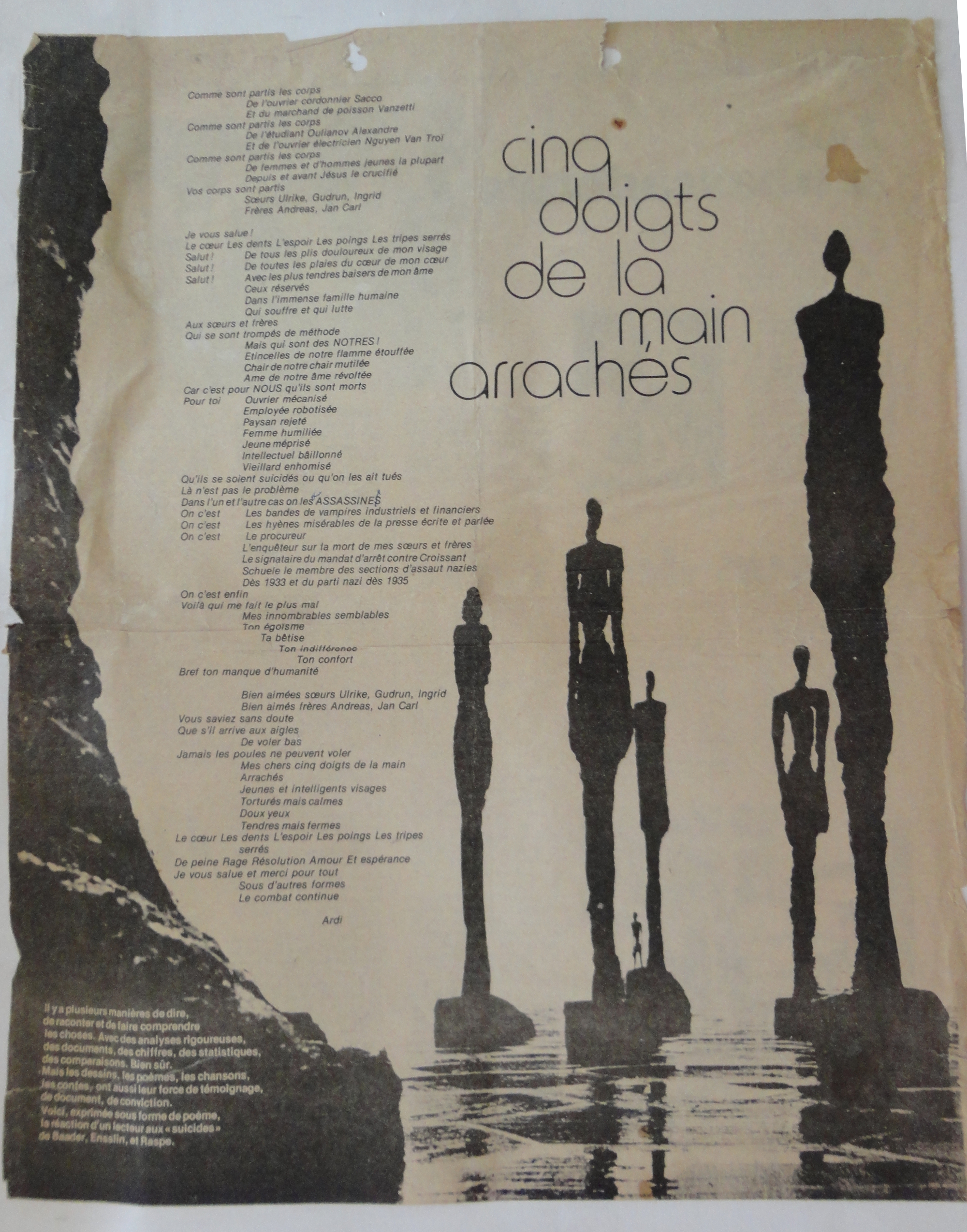
First poem of Kadour Naimi, Cinq doigts de la main arrachés, published in the weekly POUR la révolution, Brussels (Belgium)

In French

Sociology:

- La Guerre, Pourquoi ? La Paix, Comment ? Éléments de discussion pour gens de bonne volonté (War, Why? Peace, How? Subjects for discussion by men of good faith (2016), (in French).
- Un mai libre et solidaire : La traversée de 68 par un jeune algérien (A Free and Solidary May : The crossing of 68 by a young Algerian), Editions Atelier de Création Libertaire, France, 2018.

Novel :

- Chants de papillons blancs (Songs of White Butterflies), Editions Electrons Libres, 2018, ISBN 979-10-97177-07-2.

Short Novel:

- Lettre de Rome d'un E.C. (Letter from Rome by an E.C.), fifth prize in Les dernières nouvelles de Rome (The latest news from Rome) competition, organized by Librairie française La Procure in Rome (Italy) and Palombi Editori. Published in the book put out by the competition, Edition Librairie française, La Procure and Palombi Editori, 2005. Rome, Italy, ISBN 88-7621-216-7.

Poetry:

- Cinq doigts de la main arrachés (Five fingers torn from the hand), first published poem, in Pour la révolution (For the revolution), weekly, Brussels, Belgium, 7–13 decembre 1977.
- Mots d'Amour (Words of Love), French version of the Italian text, Edition Lire et méditer, coll. L'Osmose, Agen (France), 2011, ISBN 978-2-9522708-5-4.

In Italian

Short novel:

- Lettera da Roma di un E-C, (Letter from Rome by an E-C) Italian version of the French short novel. Among ten most voted stories in the competition I and Rome, organized by the Municipality of Rome, published by this institution, 2006.

Poetry, individual poems

- "Amore fantascienza" ("Science-fiction Love"), in the book Quartieri di luna (Neighborhoods of the Moon, Rome, 1998.
- "Come un treno" ("Like a train"), selected at the International Poetry Prize and Narrative, 1999, and published in the book Le cinque terre: Antologia letteraria (Le Cinque Terre: Literary anthology), 1999.
- "Exit", reviewed in Produzione e Cultura (Production and Culture), July–December, Arlem Editore, Rome, 2000.

Books

- Parole d'Amore (Words of Love), with a foreword by Dacia Maraini, Edizione del Giano, Rome, 2007, ISBN 88-70-74165-6.

== Bibliography ==
Main books that analyze the theatrical works of Naimi:

- Tamara Alexandrovna Boutisiniga, Ici commence l'Afrique (Here begins Africa), (in Russian), Moscow, 1973.
- Ali Arra'y, "االمسرح في الوطن العربي" (The theatre in the Arab nation), (in Arabic), Edition of the National Council for Culture, the arts and letters, Koweït, January 1979.
- Tamara Alexandrovna Boutisiniga, A thousand and one year of Arabic theater, (in Russian) translated into Arabic by Tawfik Almou'din, Edition Dar Alfarabi, Beyrouth, Libanon. First edition 1981, second edition 1990.
- Fawaz Alsajir, "ستانسلافسكي و المسرح العربي" (Stanislavsky and the Arab theater), (in Arabic) translated from the Russian by Fouad Almourhi, Publications of the Ministry of Culture, Damascus, Syria, 1993.
- Mohamed Kali, Le théâtre algérien, un malentendu (The Algerian theatre, a misunderstanding), (in French), Edition Ministry of Culture, Algiers, Algeria, in 2002.
- Khalid Amine, Marvin Carlson, The Theatres of Morocco, Algeria and Tunisia. Performance Traditions of the Maghreb, Londres, Palgrave-Macmillan, 2012, ISBN 978-0230278745, pp. 151, 153–4.
- Mohamed Kali, 100 ans de théâtre algérien (One Hundred Years of Algerian theatre), (in French), Socrates News Edition, Algiers, Algeria, in 2013.
- Sasaa Khaled, "تجربة قدور النعيمي أنموذجا" (The model experience of Kadour Naimi), (in Arabic), University of Oran-La Sénia, Algeria (master's thesis in theatrical arts), 2013–2014 academic year.
