= Comte de Lautréamont =

Uruguayan-born French author (1846–1870)

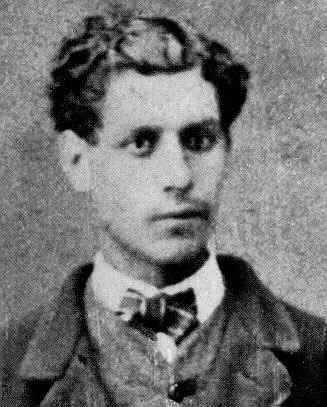
- Possibly a photo representing Lautréamont
- Born: Isidore Lucien Ducasse; 4 April 1846; Montevideo, Uruguay
- Died: 24 November 1870 (aged 24); Paris, France
- Occupation: Poet

Comte de Lautréamont (/loʊtreɪəˈmɒn/; French: [lotʁeamɔ̃]) was the nom de plume of Isidore Lucien Ducasse ([dykas]; 4 April 1846 – 24 November 1870), a French poet, born in Uruguay. His only works, Les Chants de Maldoror and Poésies, had a major influence on modern arts and literature, particularly on the Surrealists and the Situationists. Ducasse died at the age of 24.

== Biography ==
=== Youth ===
Ducasse was born in Montevideo, Uruguay, to François Ducasse, a French consular officer, and his wife Jacquette-Célestine Davezac. Very little is known about Isidore's childhood, except that he was baptized on 16 November 1847 in the Montevideo Metropolitan Cathedral and that his mother died soon afterwards, possibly due to an epidemic. Jean-Jacques Lefrère suggests she may have committed suicide, although concludes there is no way to know for certain. In 1851, as a five-year-old, he experienced the end of the eight-year Siege of Montevideo in the Uruguayan Civil War. He was brought up speaking three languages: French, Spanish, and English.

In October 1859, at the age of thirteen, he was sent to high school in France by his father. He was trained in French education and technology at the Imperial Lycée in Tarbes. In 1863 he enrolled in the Lycée Louis-Barthou in Pau, where he attended classes in rhetoric and philosophy. He excelled at arithmetic and drawing and showed extravagance in his thinking and style. Isidore was a reader of Edgar Allan Poe and particularly favored Percy Bysshe Shelley and Byron, as well as Adam Mickiewicz, Milton, Robert Southey, Alfred de Musset, and Baudelaire (see the letter of 23 October 1869 cited extensively below). At school he was fascinated by Racine and Corneille, and by the scene of the blinding in Sophocles' Oedipus Rex. According to his schoolmate Paul Lespès, he displayed obvious folly "by self-indulgent use of adjectives and an accumulation of terrible death images" in an essay. After graduation he lived in Tarbes, where he started a friendship with Georges Dazet, the son of his guardian, and decided to become a writer.

=== Years in Paris ===
After a brief stay with his father in Montevideo, Ducasse settled in Paris at the end of 1867. He began studies in view of entering the École Polytechnique, only to abandon them one year later. Continuous allowances from his father made it possible for Ducasse to dedicate himself completely to his writing. He lived in the "Intellectual Quarter", in a hotel in the Rue Notre-Dame-des-Victoires, where he worked intensely on the first canto of Les Chants de Maldoror. It is possible that he started this work before his passage to Montevideo, and also continued the work during his ocean journey.

Ducasse was a frequent visitor to nearby libraries, where he read Romantic literature, as well as scientific works and encyclopaedias. The publisher Léon Genonceaux described him as a "large, dark, young man, beardless, mercurial, neat and industrious", and reported that Ducasse wrote "only at night, sitting at his piano, declaiming wildly while striking the keys, and hammering out ever new verses to the sounds". However, this account has no corroborating evidence, and is considered unreliable.

In late 1868, Ducasse published (anonymously and at his own expense) the first canto of Les Chants de Maldoror (Chant premier, par ***), a booklet of thirty-two pages.

On 10 November 1868, Ducasse sent a letter to the writer Victor Hugo, in which he included two copies of the first canto, and asked for a recommendation for further publication. A new edition of the first canto appeared at the end of January 1869, in the anthology Parfums de l'Âme in Bordeaux. Here Ducasse used his pseudonym "Comte de Lautréamont" for the first time. His chosen name may have been based on the title character of Eugène Sue's popular 1837 gothic novel Latréaumont, a haughty and blasphemous antihero similar in some ways to Isidore's Maldoror. The pseudonym was possibly paraphrasing l'autre à Mont(evideo), although it can also be interpreted as l'autre Amon (the other Amon) or "l'autre Amont" (the other side of the river: 'En amont' = French for: 'Upstream') or, finally, from The Count of Monte Cristo, "L'autre Mond" (the other world's count). Lefrère considers another possibility: le Comte de Lautréamont = le compte de l'autre à Mont (the account of the other at Montevideo); this could be interpreted as a joke at his father's expense, who supported Ducasse with a generous allowance.

Thanks to his father's money and the banker Darasse's good offices, a total of six cantos were to be published during late 1869, by Albert Lacroix in Brussels, who had also published Eugène Sue. The book was already printed when Lacroix refused to distribute it to the booksellers as he feared prosecution for blasphemy or obscenity. Ducasse considered that this was because "life in it is painted in too harsh colors" (letter to the banker Darasse from 12 March 1870).

Ducasse urgently asked Auguste Poulet-Malassis, who had published Baudelaire's Les Fleurs du mal (The Flowers of Evil) in 1857, to send copies of his book to the critics. They alone could judge "the commencement of a publication which will see its end only later, and after I will have seen mine". He tried to explain his position, and even offered to change some "too strong" points for future editions:

I have written of evil as Mickiewicz, Byron, Milton, Southey, A. de Musset, Baudelaire and others have all done. Naturally I pulled the registers in a slightly exaggerated way, in order to create something new in the sense of a sublime literature that sings of despair only in order to oppress the reader, and make him desire the good as the remedy. Thus it is always, after all, the good which is the subject, only the method is more philosophical and less naive than that of the old school. (...) Is that evil? No, certainly not.

— letter from 23 October 1869.

Poulet-Malassis announced the forthcoming publication of the book the same month in his literary magazine Quarterly Review of Publications Banned in France and Printed Abroad. Otherwise, few people took heed of the book. Only the Bulletin du Bibliophile et du Bibliothécaire noticed it in May 1870, saying: "The book will probably find a place under the bibliographic curiosities".

=== Death ===
During spring 1869, Ducasse frequently changed his address, from 32 Rue du Faubourg Montmartre to 15 Rue Vivienne, then back to Rue Faubourg Montmartre, where he lodged in a hotel at number 7. While still awaiting the distribution of his book, Ducasse worked on a new text, a follow-up to his "phenomenological description of evil", in which he wanted to sing of good. The two works would form a whole, a dichotomy of good and evil. The work, however, remained a fragment.

In April and June 1870, Ducasse published the first two installments of what was obviously meant to be the preface to the planned "chants of the good" in two small brochures, Poésies I and II; this time he published under his real name, discarding his pseudonym. He differentiated the two parts of his work with the terms philosophy and poetry, announcing that the beginning of a struggle against evil was the reversal of his other work:

I replace melancholy with courage, doubt with certainty, despair with hope, malice with good, complaints with duty, scepticism with faith, sophisms with cool equanimity and pride with modesty.

At the same time, Ducasse took texts by famous authors and inverted, corrected and openly plagiarized for Poésies:

Plagiarism is necessary. It is implied in the idea of progress. It clasps the author's sentence tight, uses his expressions, eliminates a false idea, replaces it with the right idea.

Among the works plagiarized were Blaise Pascal's Pensées and La Rochefoucauld's Maximes, as well as the work of Jean de La Bruyère, Luc de Clapiers, Dante, Kant and La Fontaine. It even included an improvement of his own Les Chants de Maldoror. The brochures of aphoristic prose did not have a price; each customer could decide which sum they wanted to pay for it.

On 19 July 1870, Napoleon III declared war on Prussia, and after his capture, Paris was besieged on 17 September, a situation with which Ducasse was already familiar from his early childhood in Montevideo. The living conditions worsened rapidly during the siege, and according to the owner of the hotel he lodged at, Ducasse became sick with a "bad fever".

Lautréamont died at the age of 24, on 24 November 1870, at 8 am in his hotel. On his death certificate, "no further information" was given. Since many were afraid of epidemics while Paris was besieged, Ducasse was buried the next day after a service in Notre-Dame-de-Lorette in a provisional grave at the Cimetière du Nord. In January 1871, his body was put into another grave elsewhere.

In his Poésies Lautréamont announced: "I will leave no memoirs", and as such, the life of the creator of Les Chants de Maldoror remains for the most part unknown.

== Les Chants de Maldoror ==
Les Chants de Maldoror is based on a character called Maldoror, a figure of unrelenting evil who has forsaken God and mankind. The book combines a violent narrative with vivid and often surrealistic imagery.

The critic Alex De Jonge writes: "Lautréamont forces his readers to stop taking their world for granted. He shatters the complacent acceptance of the reality proposed by their cultural traditions and makes them see that reality for what it is: an unreal nightmare all the more hair-raising because the sleeper believes he is awake".

There is a wealth of Lautréamont criticism, interpretation and analysis in French (including an esteemed biography by Jean-Jacques Lefrère), but little in English.

Lautréamont's writing has many bizarre scenes, vivid imagery and drastic shifts in tone and style. There is much "black humor"; De Jonge argues that Maldoror reads like "a sustained sick joke".

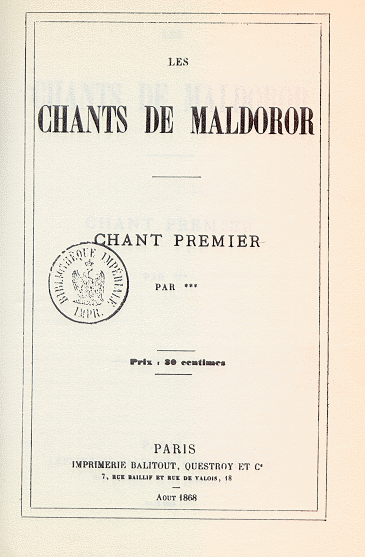
First edition of "Les Chants de Maldoror": the booklet, sold for 30 cents, is anonymous (August 1868).

== Poésies ==
Poésies (Poems, Poetry) is Ducasse's other, minor surviving work, and is divided into two parts. Unlike Maldoror, Poésies was published under Ducasse's given name.

Both parts consist of a series of maxims or aphorisms in prose, which express aesthetic opinions concerning literature and poetry. These statements frequently refer to authors of the western canon and compare their works and talents in rhetorical language; cited authors include the Greek tragedians, Edgar Allan Poe, and especially many French authors of Ducasse's period, including Charles Baudelaire, Alexandre Dumas, and Victor Hugo. Poésies is therefore not a collection of poetry as its title suggests, but instead a work of literary criticism, or poetics. Poésies also contrasts with the negative themes of Maldoror in the sense that it uses far more positive, uplifting, and humanistic language. Goodness and conventional moral values are regularly praised, even as authors familiar to Ducasse are sometimes denigrated:

Do not deny the immortality of the soul, God's wisdom, the value of life, the order of the universe, physical beauty, the love of the family, marriage, social institutions. Ignore the following baneful pen-pushers: Sand, Balzac, Alexander Dumas, Musset, Du Terrail, Féval, Flaubert, Baudelaire, Leconte and the Grève des Forgerons!

— Poésies, Part I

Despite this, there are commonalities with Maldoror. Both works regularly describe animals by way of simile or colorful analogy, and although God is praised, other passages suggest on the contrary a humanism which places man above God: "Elohim is made in man's image."

== Surrealism ==
In 1917, French writer Philippe Soupault discovered a copy of Les Chants de Maldoror in the mathematics section of a small Parisian bookshop, near the military hospital to which he had been admitted. In his memoirs Soupault wrote:

By the light of a candle that was permitted to me, I began reading. It was like an enlightenment. In the morning I read the Chants again, convinced that I had dreamed... The day after, André Breton came to visit me. I gave him the book and asked him to read it. The following day he brought it back, enthusiastic as I had been.

Due to this find, Lautréamont was introduced to the Surrealists. Soon they called him their prophet. As one of the poètes maudits (accursed poets), he was elevated to the Surrealist pantheon beside Charles Baudelaire and Arthur Rimbaud, and acknowledged as a direct precursor to Surrealism. In the first edition of the Manifeste du Surréalisme (1924) Breton wrote: "With Les Chants de Maldoror the Surrealism was born. Older examples can only be traced all the way back to the time of prophets and oracles". André Gide regarded him — even more than Rimbaud — as the most significant figure, as the "gate-master of tomorrow's literature", meriting Breton and Soupault "to have recognized and announced the literary and ultra-literary importance of the amazing Lautréamont".

Louis Aragon and Breton discovered the only copies of the Poésies in the National Library of France, and published the text in April and May 1919 in two sequential editions of their magazine Literature. In 1925, a special edition of the Surrealist magazine Le Disque Vert was dedicated to Lautréamont, under the title "Le cas Lautréamont" (The Lautréamont case). It was the 1927 publication by Soupault and Breton that assured him a permanent place in French literature and the status of patron saint in the Surrealist movement. In 1930, Aragon called Lautréamont the "veritable initiator of the modern marvelous", with "the marvelous" being a primary feature of Breton's Surrealism. In 1940, Breton incorporated him into his Anthology of Black Humour.

The title of an object by American artist Man Ray, called L'énigme d'Isidore Ducasse (The Enigma of Isidore Ducasse), created in 1920, contains a reference to a famous line in Canto VI, Chapter 3. Lautréamont describes a young boy as "beautiful as the chance meeting on a dissecting-table of a sewing-machine and an umbrella". Similarly, Breton often used this line as an example of Surrealist dislocation. In direct reference to Lautréamont's "chance meeting on a dissection table", Max Ernst defined the structure of the surrealist painting as "a linking of two realities that by all appearances have nothing to link them, in a setting that by all appearances does not fit them". Referencing this line, the debut record by the experimental/industrial music group Nurse with Wound is titled Chance Meeting on a Dissecting Table of a Sewing Machine and an Umbrella.

Maldoror inspired many artists: Fray De Geetere, Salvador Dalí, Man Ray, Jacques Houplain, Jindřich Štyrský, René Magritte, Georg Baselitz and Victor Man. Individual works have been produced by Max Ernst, Victor Brauner, Óscar Domínguez, André Masson, Joan Miró, Aimé Césaire, Roberto Matta, Wolfgang Paalen, Kurt Seligmann and Yves Tanguy. The artist Amedeo Modigliani always carried a copy of the book with him and used to walk around Montparnasse quoting from it.

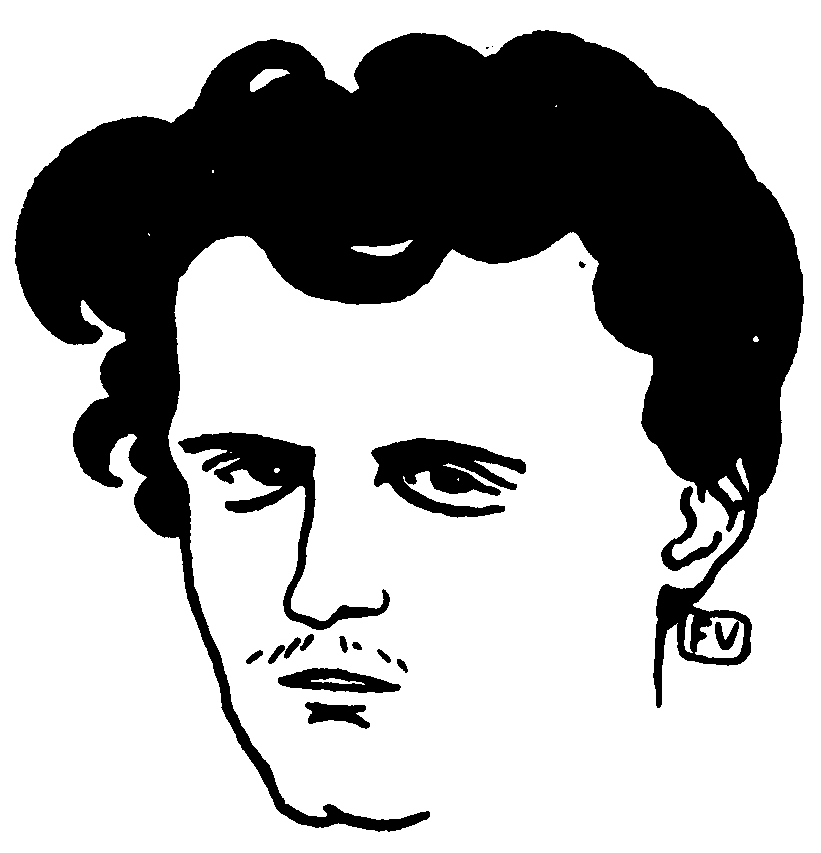
An imagined portrait of Lautréamont by Félix Vallotton in The Book of masks from Remy de Gourmont (1898).

Félix Vallotton and Dalí made "imaginary" portraits of Lautréamont, since no photograph was available.

== Influence on others ==
Kadour Naimi realized an adaptation of Les Chants de Maldoror, in theater in 1984, and as a film in 1997.

A portion of Maldoror is recited toward the end of Jean-Luc Godard's 1967 film Week End.

Situationist founder, filmmaker and author Guy Debord developed a section from Poésies II as thesis 207 in The Society of the Spectacle. The thesis covers plagiarism as a necessity and how it is implied by progress. It explains that plagiarism embraces an author's phrase, makes use of his expressions, erases a false idea, and replaces it with the right idea. His fellow Situationist Raoul Vaneigem placed considerable importance on the insights of Lautréamont, stating in the Introduction to The Revolution of Everyday Life that: "For as long as there have been men — and men who read Lautréamont — everything has been said and few people have gained anything from it."

The writers Jean Paulhan and Henri Michaux have both counted Lautréamont as an influence on their work.

Kenneth Anger claimed to have tried to make a film based on Maldoror, under the same title, but could not raise enough money to complete it.

In recent years, invoking an obscure clause in the French civil code, Article 171, modern performance artist Shishaldin petitioned the government for permission to marry the author posthumously.

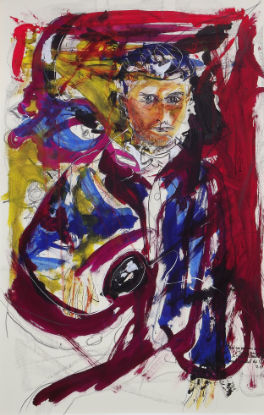
Lautréamont, by the French painter Arnaud Courlet de Vregille (2012, acrylic, 90 x 120)

John Ashbery, an American poet influenced by surrealism, entitled his 1992 collection Hotel Lautréamont, and the English edition notes that Lautréamont is "one of the forgotten presences alive" in the book.

Brazilian author Joca Reiners Terron depicts the character of Isidoro Ducasse as one of the seven angels of the Apocalypse in his first novel, Não Há Nada Lá. Ducasse's character becomes obsessed with an edition of Les Fleurs du mal in the novel, while taking a trip by train through Europe. Both Ducasse and his Chants de Maldoror are also briefly mentioned in Jô Soares' 1995 novel O Xangô de Baker Street, and musician Rogério Skylab has a song inspired by, and named after, the Chants of Maldoror in his 2021 album Caos e Cosmos, Vol. 1.

Isidore Ducasse is the given name of the fashion creator in William Klein's 1966 movie Who Are You, Polly Maggoo?.

Lautréamont, as an unnamed "South American", appears as a character in Julio Cortázar's short story "The Other Heaven", which also uses quotations from Maldoror as epigraphs.

French philosopher Gilles Deleuze and psychoanalyst Félix Guattari cited Lautréamont twice over the course of their joint two-volume work, Capitalism and Schizophrenia, once in each volume. (Note: In this domain as in the others, isn't there a properly libidinal conflict between a paranoiac-Oedipalizing element of science, and a schizorevolutionary element? That very conflict that leads Lacan to say there exists a drama for the scientist. ("J.R. Mayer, Cantor, I will not draw up an honor roll of these dramas that sometimes lead to madness..., a list that could not include itself in Oedipus, unless it were to call Oedipus in question." Since, in point of fact, Oedipus does not intervene in these dramas as a familial figure or even as a mental structure; its intervention is determined by an axiomatic acting as an oedipalizing factor, resulting in a specifically scientific Oedipus.) And in contrast to Lautréamont's song that rises up around the paranoiac-Oedipal-narcissistic pole-"O rigorous mathematics....Arithmetic! algebra! geometry! imposing trinity! luminous triangle!"-there is another song: O schizophrenic mathematics, uncontrollable and mad desiring-machines!) (Note: In contrast to natural history, man is now no longer the eminent term of the series; that term may be an animal for man, the lion, crab, bird of prey, or louse, in relation to a given act or function, in accordance with a given demand of the unconscious. Bachelard wrote a fine Jungian book when he elaborated the ramified series of Lautréamont, taking into account the speed coefficient of the metamorphoses and the degree of perfection of each term in relation to a pure aggressiveness as the principle of the series: the serpent's fang, the horn of the rhinoceros, the dog's tooth, the owl's beak; and higher up, the claw of the eagle or the vulture, the pincer of the crab, the legs of the louse, the suckers of the octopus.)

Róbert Wittinger composed a Maldoror Requiem, for 8 soloists, mixed choir, narrator and large orchestra, Op.42 (1984–86).

== Bibliography ==
- Les Chants de Maldoror - Chant premier, par *** (1st canto, published anonymously), Imprimerie Balitout, Questroy et Cie, Paris, August 1868
- Les Chants de Maldoror - Chant premier, par Comte de Lautréamont (1st canto, published under the pseudonym Comte de Lautréamont), in: "Parfums de l'Ame" (anthology, edited by Evariste Carrance), Bordeaux, 1869
- Les Chants de Maldoror (first complete edition, not delivered to the booksellers), A. Lacroix, Verboeckhoven et Cie, Brussels, 1869
- Poésies I, Librairie Gabrie, Balitout, Questroy et Cie, Paris, 1870
- Poésies II, Librairie Gabrie, Balitout, Questroy et Cie, Paris, 1870
- Les Chants de Maldoror, Typ. de E. Wittmann, Paris and Brussels, 1874 (1869's complete edition, with new cover)
- Les Chants de Maldoror, preface by Léon Genonceaux, with a letter by Lautréamont, Éditions Léon Genonceaux, 1890 (new edition)
- Les Chants de Maldoror, with 65 illustrations by Frans De Geetere, Éditions Henri Blanchetière, Paris, 1927
- Les Chants de Maldoror, with 42 illustrations by Salvador Dalí; Albert Skira Éditeur, Paris, 1934
- Œuvres Complètes, with a preface by André Breton und illustrations by Victor Brauner, Óscar Domínguez, Max Ernst, Espinoza, René Magritte, André Masson, Joan Miró, Roberto Matta, Wolfgang Paalen, Man Ray, Kurt Seligmann and Yves Tanguy, G.L.M. (Guy Levis Mano), Paris, 1938
- Maldoror, with 27 illustrations by Jacques Houplain, Société de francs-bibliophiles, Paris, 1947
- Les Chants de Maldoror. with 77 illustrations by René Magritte; Éditions de "La Boetie", Brussels, 1948
- Œuvres complètes. Fac-similés des éditions originales (facsimiles of the original editions), La Table Ronde, Paris, 1970
- Œuvres complètes, based on the edition of 1938, with all historical prefaces by Léon Genonceaux (Édition Genouceaux, Paris, 1890), Rémy de Gourmont (Édition de la Sirène, Paris, 1921), Edmond Jaloux (Éditions Librairie José Corti, Paris, April 1938), Philippe Soupault (Éditions Charlot, Paris, 1946) Julien Gracq (La Jeune Parque, Paris, 1947), Roger Caillois (Éditions Librairie José Corti 1947), Maurice Blanchot (Éditions du Club français du livre, Paris, 1949), Éditions Librairie José Corti, Paris, 1984
- Les Chants de Maldoror, with 81 illustrations by Tagliamani; Éditions de la Baconnière, Genève, 2012
- Lautréamont, Subject to Interpretation, Brill/Rodopi, Amsterdam, 2015

=== Translations ===
- The Lay of Maldoror. London: Casanova Society, 1924. First English translation, by John Rodker. Illustrated with 3 plates by Odilon Redon
- Maldoror. Translated by Guy Wernham; New Directions Publishing, 1943; 0-8112-0082-5
- Lautréamont's Maldoror. Translated by Alexis Lykiard; London: Allison & Busby, 1970; vi+218 pp. Paperback 1972, ISBN 0-85031-084-9
- Maldoror (Les Chants de Maldoror). New York: Thomas Y. Crowell Company, 1970; English translation by Alexis Lykiard
- Maldoror. Great Britain: Penguin Books, "Penguin Classics" series, 1977. Fourth English translation (after Rodker, Wernham and Lykiard) by Paul Knight. Also contains "Poesies" and several "lettres". Extensive introduction by translator.
- Poésies and Complete Miscellanea, translated by Alexis Lykiard. London: Allison & Busby, 1977. ISBN 0-85031-238-8
- Maldoror (and the Complete Works of the Comte de Lautréamont). Cambridge, MA: Exact Change, 1994; Translated into English by Alexis Lykiard with updated notes and bibliography; ISBN 1-878972-12-X
- Maldoror and Poems. Translated, with Introduction, by Paul Knight. New York: Penguin Books, 1988. Cover illustration is a color reproduction of Antoine Wiertz' "Buried Alive" (detail); 288 pp.; ISBN 0-14-044342-8
