= African theatre =

African theatre or African Theatre may refer to:

- African theatre of World War I
- African theatre of World War II
  - Part of the Mediterranean Theater of Operations of the United States Armed Forces during World War II
- African Theatre (acting troupe), a 19th-century African-American theater based in Harlem, New York City
- African Theatre (Cape Town), a South African theatre
