= African Theatre (Cape Town) =

Building that was a theatre in Cape Town, South Africa

Coordinates: 33°55′17″S 18°25′03″E

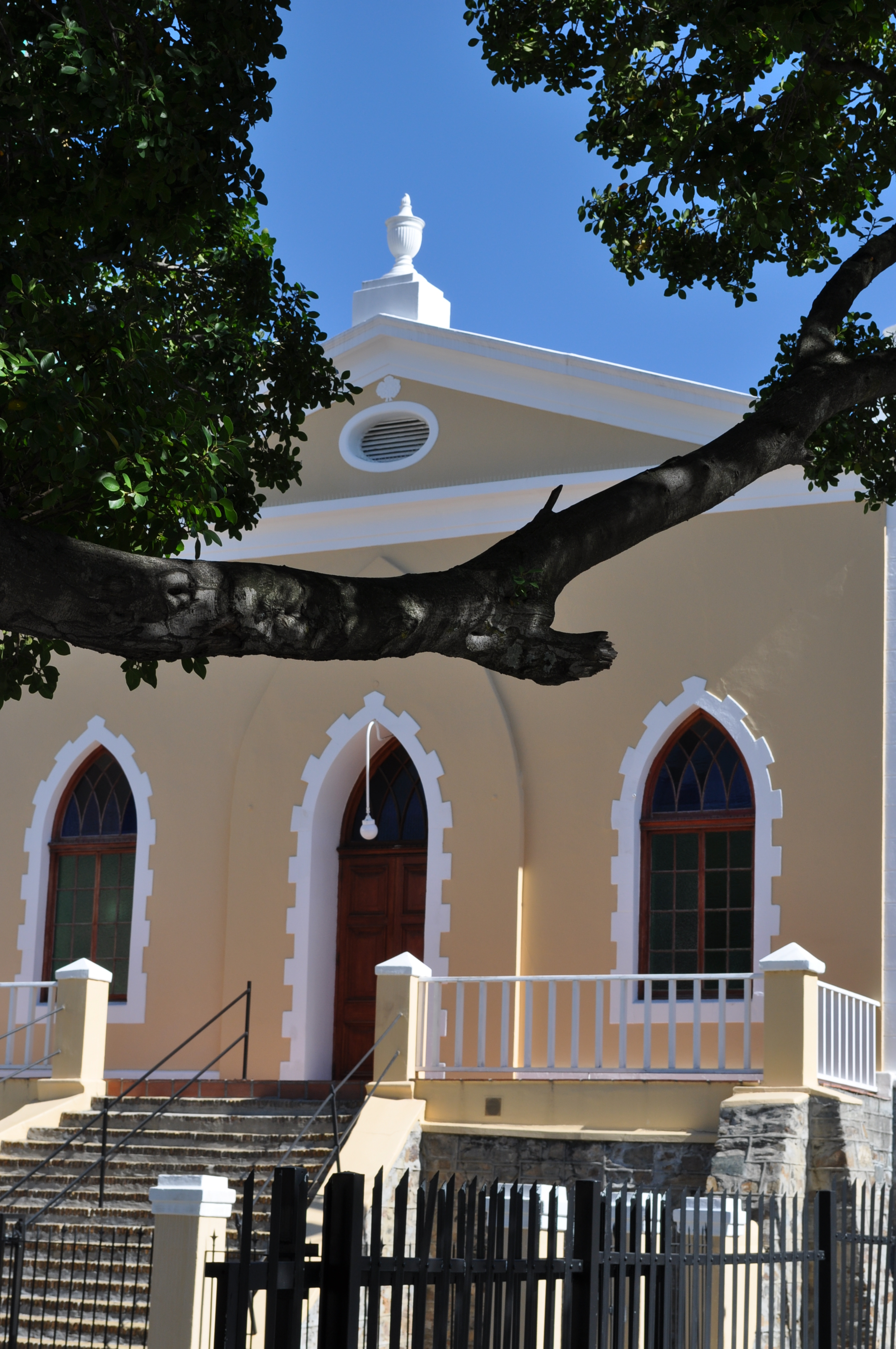
An image of African Theatre (Cape Town)

The African Theatre (Afrikaans: Afrikaansche Schouwburg) was a theatre in Cape Town, South Africa. It was the first stone theater in the European style in South Africa and one of the first in the Southern Hemisphere. It was also known by other names, such as the Komediehuis, The Theatre, etc. The building was later used as a church by the Dutch Reformed Church in South Africa (NGK) and stands to this day.

== History ==
The British governor at the time, Sir George Yonge, 5th Baronet, designed the theater and had it built in 1800 in what is now Riebeeck Square in downtown Cape Town. It had no lobby or orchestra pit and the stage was small, but the interior was lavish, featuring a balcony and richly decorated boxes for patrons. Underneath the theatre lay storerooms and shops. An orchestra pit was built in 1804.

It has two stories and lies on Bree Street. The foundation for about two meters below the walls is exposed Table Mountain Sandstone, and the rest of the walls are stuccoed stone and mudbrick.

The theatre opened in September 1801 with a production of William Shakespeare's Henry IV, Part 1, which is commonly regarded as the beginning of live entertainment in South Africa. Both Dutch and British plays were presented. The first Dutch play known to be performed there was a translation of August von Kotzebue's Der Papagoy, staged on March 5, 1803. Theatre in Dutch proved an important precursor to theatre in Afrikaans.

The Frenchman Charles Etienne Boniface, who came to the Cape Colony in 1806 and remained active in theatre in South Africa for the next 46 years, aroused much scandal with his works, mostly cabaret. They were racy and commanded attention.

== Closure ==
When Anglican Church authorities got wind of the increasingly worldly content being shared there, the theatre was closed in 1836. The slaves were freed at the time and held their first church services in 1838 in the building. Outraged owners, or slaves according to some sources, pelted the building with stones, lending it the name St. Stephen's Church, after Saint Stephen (who was the first martyr to be stoned). On November 12, 1857, the NGK took over the building and made several alterations to suit their use of it.

The church is now a national heritage site. In the early 2000s, the St. Stephen's Restoration Trust began refurbishing the building. Original paint colors were approximated based on 19th-century paintings. Paint was stripped from the pews to display the original color of the yellowwood, American pine, and oak used.

The restored building was reopened in January 2009.
