= Abdelkader Alloula =

Algerian playwright

- عبد القادر علولة
- Born: 1939; Ghazaouet, French Algeria
- Died: March 14, 1994 (aged 54–55); Oran, Algeria
- Cause of death: Assassinated by the GIA
- Occupation: Playwright

Abdelkader Alloula Arabic: عبد القادر علولة (1939 in Ghazaouet, Algeria – March 14, 1994, in Oran, Algeria) was an Algerian playwright. He was assassinated by GIA terrorists.

== Biography ==
Alloula was born in Ghazaouet in western Algeria. He joined the Algerian National Theatre upon its creation in 1963 following independence. His works, typically in vernacular Algerian Arabic, included:

- El-Aâleg (1969) - "The Leech", a satire of corrupt administration
- El-Khobza (1970) - "Bread"
- Homq Salim (1972) - "Salim's Madness", a monologue based on Nikolai Gogol's "Diary of a Madman"
- Hammam Rabbi (1975) - "The Lord's Bath", based on Gogol's The Government Inspector
- The Generous Trilogy:
  - El-Agoual (1980) - "The Sayings"
  - El-Adjouad (1984) - "The Generous"
  - El-Litham (1989) - "The Veil"

He was working on an Arabic version of Tartuffe when he was shot by two members of FIDA (Islamic Front for Armed Jihad) during Ramadan on March 10, 1994, as he left his house in Oran. He was transferred to a hospital in Paris, where he died four days later. His widow, Radja Alloula, and friends set up the Abdelkader Alloula Foundation in his memory.

His brother, Malek Alloula, is also a noted Algerian writer.
