= Abderrahmane Kaki =

Abdelkader Ould Abderrahmane
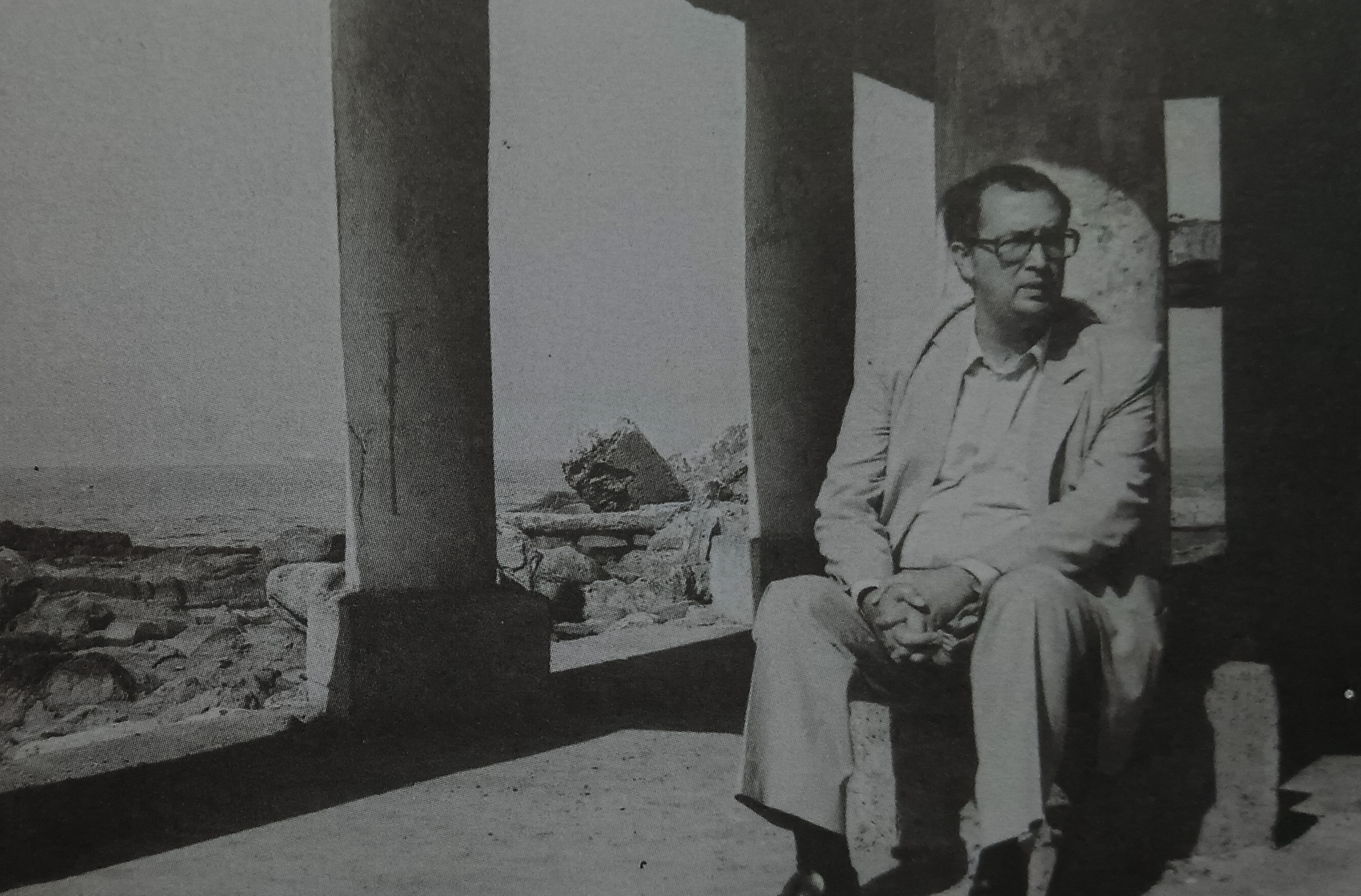
- Born: Abdelkader Ould Abderrahmane; February 18, 1934; Mostaganem (Algeria)
- Died: February 14, 1995 (aged 60); Oran (Algeria)
- Other names: Abdelkader Kaki
- Occupations: Actor, playwright
- Notable work: 132 ans (play)

Abdelkader Ould Abderrahmane, known as Abderrahmane Kaki (born February 18, 1934, in Mostaganem and died on February 14, 1995, in Oran), was an Algerian actor, playwright, author and director of twenty plays.

== Early life ==
Abderrahmane Kaki was born in Mostaganem in the popular neighborhood of Tidjitt. From his childhood he developed in contact with strong cultural traditions. One of his grandmothers knew from memory a large number of kacidate(stories); one of his uncles was a music lover. He participated in popular festivals in which the meddahs(storytellers) rubbed shoulders with the Bedouin song master Cheikh Hamada, whose children were his playmates.

During the first decade of Algerian independence, he appeared to be the most active and prominent creator in the field of theaters until a car accident in 1968 stopped his ascent, causing him to withdraw from active life for four years. He was later director of the Théâtre Régional d'Oran.

== Works ==
1951:

- Tarikh zahra; La légende de la rose (The legend of the rose)
- Dem el hob (The blood of love)
- La Maison de Dieu (The House of God)

1960:

- Avant-théâtre

1962:

- 132 ans (132 years)
- Le Peuple de la nuit (The People of the night)

1963:

- Ifrikya qabla I; Afrique avant un (Africa before one)

1964:

- Diwan el garagouz

1965:

- El Guerrâb ouas-Sâlihîn (El guerrab ouel essalihine); Le porteur d'eau et les trois marabouts

1966:

- Koul ouahad ou hakmou; A chacun sa justice (To each his justice)

1967:

- Les vieux (The elderly persons)

1972:

- Bni kelboun (Beni kelboune)

1975:

- Diwan el mela (Diwan el mlah)

== Bibliography ==
- Kamel Bendimered, Ould Abderrahmane Kaki, Le pionnier du théâtre «ihtifali», dans «Djazaïr» no 3, Alger, 2003, pp. 30–31.
