= List of films set in ancient Rome =

This article lists films and tv shows set in the city of Rome during the Roman Kingdom, the Roman Republic, or the Roman Empire. The films only partly set in Rome are so noted.

== The founding of Rome ==
Films set during the founding of Rome include:

Title	Release date	Notes
Duel of the Titans	1961	based on the legend of Romulus and Remus with Steve Reeves as Romulus and Gordon Scott as Remus
The Avenger	1962	based on Virgil's Aeneid with Steve Reeves as Aeneas: a story of the hero leading escaped survivors of the Trojan War to new land in Italy
The First King	2019	in archaic Latin; directed by Matteo Rovere
Romulus (TV series)	2020–2022	Italian TV series, loosely based on the myth of Romulus

== The Roman Kingdom ==
=== Reign of Romulus ===
Title	Release date	Notes
Romulus and the Sabines	1961	about the Rape of the Sabine Women (dir. by Richard Pottier)
The Rape of the Sabine Women	1962	

=== Reign of Tullus Hostilius ===
Title	Release date	Notes
Duel of Champions	1961	with Alan Ladd as Horatius and Robert Keith as Tullus Hostilius

== The Roman Republic ==
=== Early Roman Republic ===
Title	Release date	Notes
Amazons of Rome	1961	French-Italian film (directed by Carlo Luigi Bragaglia and Vittorio Cottafavi), including characters of Etruscan king Porsenna and Mucius Scaevola
Brennus, Enemy of Rome	1963	about the Battle of the Allia and sack of Rome in 387 BC, with Gordon Mitchell as Brennus
Hero of Rome	1964	with Gordon Scott as Gaius Mucius Scaevola (directed by Giorgio Ferroni)
Coriolanus: Hero without a Country	1964	with Gordon Scott as Gaius Marcius Coriolanus (dir. by Giorgio Ferroni)

=== Second Punic War ===
Title	Release date	Notes
Cabiria	1914	a monumental Italian production (dir. by Giovanni Pastrone, after the screenplay by Gabriele d'Annunzio), touching on Hannibal's campaign in Italy, the siege of Syracuse and Battle of Zama, featuring such characters as Masinissa; also the first Maciste film
Scipio Africanus: The Defeat of Hannibal	1937	about the career of Scipio Africanus up to his defeat of Hannibal at the Battle of Zama
Jupiter's Darling	1955	with Howard Keel as Hannibal and George Sanders as Fabius Maximus
Hannibal	1959	Italian post-war production about Hannibal's campaign in Italy including the Battle of Cannae. Stars Victor Mature.
The Loves of Salammbo	1960	loosely based on the novel Salammbô by Gustave Flaubert.
Siege of Syracuse	1960	on the siege of Syracuse, with Rossano Brazzi as Archimedes
Hannibal	2006	TV docudrama directed by Edward Bazalgette, with Alexander Siddig as Hannibal

=== Third Punic War ===
Title	Release date	Notes
Carthage in Flames	1960	after the novel by Emilio Salgari, dir. by Carmine Gallone

=== 2nd century BC ===
Title	Release date	Notes
The Centurion	1961	about the Battle of Corinth (146 BC), with John Drew Barrymore as Diaeus
Scipio the African	1971	about the later life of Scipio; directed by Luigi Magni, with Marcello Mastroianni as Scipio the African, Silvana Mangano as Aemilia Tertia and Vittorio Gassman as Cato the Elder
Revolution (Ancient Rome: The Rise and Fall of an Empire – Episode Four)	2006	docudrama about of the reforms of Tiberius Gracchus

=== Third Servile War ===
Title	Release date	Notes
Spartak	1926	an early Soviet production (dir. by Ertugrul Muhsin-Bey), based on the novel by Raffaello Giovagnoli [now lost]
Sins of Rome	1953	dir. by Riccardo Freda
Spartacus	1960	with Kirk Douglas as Spartacus and Laurence Olivier as Marcus Licinius Crassus (dir. by Stanley Kubrick)
The Slave	1962	unofficial Italian sequel to Spartacus directed by Sergio Corbucci
Spartacus and the Ten Gladiators	1964	directed by Nick Nostro
The Revenge of Spartacus	1965	directed by Michele Lupo
Spartacus	2004	with Goran Visnjic as Spartacus (dir. by Robert Dornheim)
Spartacus: Blood and Sand	2010	with Andy Whitfield as Spartacus, Manu Bennett as Crixus, Peter Mensah as Oenomaus, John Hannah as Lentulus Batiatus, and Craig Parker as Gaius Claudius Glaber
Spartacus: Gods of the Arena	2011	prequel to Spartacus: Blood and Sand. The plot of Gods of the Arena follows Lentulus Batiatus's (John Hannah) life as a lanista, and Gannicus's (Dustin Clare) time as a gladiator
Spartacus: Vengeance	2012	sequel to Spartacus: Blood and Sand, with Liam McIntyre replacing Andy Whitfield as Spartacus, after Whitfield's unexpected death in 2011
Spartacus: War of the Damned	2013	the third season of the series
Spartacus: House of Ashur	2025–2026	sequel series to Spartacus

=== Julius Caesar ===
Title	Release date	Notes
Gaius Julius Caesar	1914	a silent film, directed by Enrico Guazzoni
Julius Caesar	1950	(directed by David Bradley). This is a film adaptation of Shakespeare's play
Julius Caesar	1953	deals with the assassination of Julius Caesar and the Liberators' civil war, with Marlon Brando as Mark Antony and John Gielgud as Gaius Cassius Longinus (directed by Joseph L. Mankiewicz). This is a film adaptation of Shakespeare's play
Slave of Rome	1961	set in Gaul during the Gallic Wars
Julius Caesar Against the Pirates	1962	a tale of Caesar being caught by pirates and asking for help to get back to Rome
Caesar the Conqueror	1962	an Italian film about the career of Julius Caesar and his Gallic Wars (directed by Tanio Boccia)
Giants of Rome	1964	Italian-French adventure film set in the Roman warfare against Vercingetorix (directed by Antonio Margheriti), with Richard Harrison as Claudius Marcellus
Revolt of the Barbarians	1964	set shortly after the Gallic Wars
Julius Caesar	1970	deals with the assassination of Julius Caesar and the Liberators' civil war
Asterix and Obelix vs. Caesar	1999	French film based on the several Goscinny and Uderzo's Asterix comic-book stories
Druids	2001	the life and career of Vercingetorix (starring Christopher Lambert), a Gallic adversary of Rome in the film of Jacques Dorfmann
Julius Caesar	2002	
Empire	2005	
Rome	2005	deals with the assassination of Julius Caesar and the Liberators' civil war
Caesar (Ancient Rome: The Rise and Fall of an Empire – Episode One)	2006	docudrama about the Gallic Wars and Caesar's Civil War
Asterix at the Olympic Games	2008	French film loosely adapted from the Asterix at the Olympic Games comic book, with Alain Delon as Caesar
Asterix and Obelix: God Save Britannia	2012	film is based on comic-books: Asterix in Britain and Asterix and the Normans
Dragon Blade	2015	By 48 BC, The Roman Republic enters the Silk Road under the command of General Tiberius who leads the Romans against Rebel forces of Huo An and the Han dynasty
Asterix & Obelix: The Middle Kingdom	2023	with Vincent Cassel as Caesar. It is the first live-action Asterix film not based on any of the comic albums

=== Cleopatra ===
Title	Release date	Notes
Robbing Cleopatra's Tomb	1899	French film made by Georges Méliès, the earliest known version considered to be lost, retrieved 2005
Antony and Cleopatra	1908	a film starring Maurice Costello and Florence Lawrence
Cléopâtre	1910	French film by Henri Andréani and Ferdinand Zecca
Cléopâtre	1912	new silent version after the play of Victorien Sardou (dir. by Charles L. Gaskill)
Antony and Cleopatra	1913	Italian production from the era of the silent film, directed by Enrico Guazzoni
Cleopatra	1917	American film with Theda Bara as Cleopatra (dir. by J. Gordon Edwards)
Cleopatra	1928	the second American version (dir. by Roy William Neill)
Cleopatra	1934	with Claudette Colbert as Cleopatra (dir. by Cecil B. DeMille)
Caesar and Cleopatra	1945	with Vivien Leigh as Cleopatra and Claude Rains as Julius Caesar (dir. by Gabriel Pascal), after the play by G. B. Shaw
Serpent of the Nile	1953	directed by William Castle with Rhonda Fleming as Cleopatra
Two Nights with Cleopatra	1954	with Sophia Loren as Cleopatra (dir. by Mario Mattoli)
Legions of the Nile	1959	Italian film directed by Vittorio Cottafavi
A Queen for Caesar	1962	Italian film, starring Pascale Petit (dir. by Piero Pierotti and Victor Tourjansky)
Cleopatra	1963	including the Battle of Actium and the Final War of the Roman Republic, with Elizabeth Taylor as Cleopatra, Richard Burton as Mark Antony and Rex Harrison as Julius Caesar (dir. by Joseph L. Mankiewicz)
Carry On Cleo	1964	a parody of J. Mankiewicz's Cleopatra with Sid James as Mark Antony (dir. by Gerald Thomas), set in the reign of Julius Caesar
Asterix and Cleopatra	1968	Belgian-French animated film (dir. by René Goscinny and Albert Uderzo), as well as Asterix & Obelix: Mission Cleopatra (2002) a French/Italian film based on the same source, Goscinny and Uderzo's 1963 comic-book Asterix and Cleopatra
Antony and Cleopatra	1972	a film starring Charlton Heston and Hildegarde Neil
Antony and Cleopatra	1974	a television version of a Royal Shakespeare Company production starring Richard Johnson and Janet Suzman
Antony and Cleopatra	1981	a television version produced as part of the BBC Television Shakespeare starring Colin Blakely and Jane Lapotaire
The Cleopatras	1983	BBC TV 8-episode series on the latter part of the reign of the Ptolemaic dynasty (dir. by John Frankau)
Cleopatra	1999	with Leonor Varela as Cleopatra and Timothy Dalton as Julius Caesar (dir. by Franc Roddam), based on the book by Margaret George
Rome	2005	portrays Cleopatra’s rejection of her brother Ptolemy XIII as a co-ruler as well as her relationships with Roman figures including Julius Caesar and Marc Antony
Cleopatra	2007	Brazilian film with Alessandra Negrini as Cleopatra and Miguel Falabella as Julius Caesar (directed by Júlio Bressane)

== The Roman Empire ==
=== Reigns of Augustus and Tiberius ===
Title	Release date	Notes
Barabbas	1953	Swedish version (dir. by Alf Sjöberg), the first based on the novel by Pär Lagerkvist
The Robe	1953	based on the novel by Lloyd C. Douglas, with Richard Burton as Marcellus and Jean Simmons as Diana (dir. by Henry Koster)
Demetrius and the Gladiators	1954	sequel to The Robe (dir. Delmer Daves)
Desert Desperadoes	1959	Herodian Kingdom of Judea during the reign of Herod the Great
Barabbas	1961	American version, dir. by Richard Fleischer, starring Anthony Quinn
Alone Against Rome	1962	peplum film directed by Luciano Ricci and starring Lang Jeffries and Rossana Podestà
Massacre in the Black Forest	1967	about the Battle of the Teutoburg Forest (dir. by Ferdinando Baldi)
The Cantabrians	1980	about the Cantabrian wars with Paul Naschy (also director) as Marcus Agrippa
Imperium: Augustus	2003	
Empire	2005	TV series
Rome	2005–2007	22-episode TV series, a joint British-American-Italian production on Rome's transition from Republic to Empire (dir. by Michael Apted)
The Inquiry	2006	with Max von Sydow as Tiberius
Barabbas	2012	the latest version based on the Lagerkvist's book, dir. by Roger Young, starring Billy Zane
Barbarians	2020–2022	German historical war drama series about the Battle of the Teutoburg Forest
Domina	2021–2023	TV series that charts the life and rise of Livia Drusilla, the powerful wife of the Roman emperor Augustus Caesar

=== The Life of Jesus ===
Title	Release date	Notes
La vie et la passion de Jésus-Christ	1903	French Pathé production (dir. by Ferdinand Zecca) [second version (1907) as Vie et passion de notre seigneur Jésus-Christ]
Ben-Hur	1907	the first known version (15-minute long) adapted from the famous Lew Wallace novel, dir. by Sidney Olcott
From the Manger to the Cross	1912	American film shot on location in the Middle East, dir. by Sidney Olcott
La vie et la passion de Jésus-Christ	1914	French Pathé remake (dir. by Maurice Maître)
Intolerance	1916	silent film told in several time-periods with a segment set in 27 AD leading to the Crucifixion
Three Ages	1923	a parody of Intolerance starring Buster Keaton also with its own Roman section
Ben-Hur: A Tale of the Christ	1925	silent film dir. by Fred Niblo, starring Ramon Novarro (the picture noteworthy for its color segments and for the female nudity in the parade sequence)
King of Kings	1927	
Golgotha	1935	
Salome	1953	directed by William Dieterle
The Sword and the Cross	1958	the relationship between Maria Magdalene and Jesus Christ
Herod the Great	1959	Italian-French historical drama directed by Victor Tourjansky, starring Edmund Purdom
Ben-Hur	1959	a monumental Hollywood production directed by William Wyler, starring Charlton Heston; partly set in Rome
King of Kings	1961	
Pontius Pilate	1962	with Jean Marais as Pontius Pilate
Monty Python's Life of Brian	1979	dir. by Terry Jones
The Last Temptation of Christ	1988	dir. by Martin Scorsese, with Willem Dafoe as Jesus Christ
The Gospel of John	2003	A 3-hr account narrated by Christopher Plummer word-for-word from The Good News Bible.
Ben-Hur	2003	animated version (the fourth in all) of the novel by Lew Wallace
The Passion of the Christ	2004	dir. by Mel Gibson, with Jim Caviezel as Jesus Christ; recorded in original languages (Aramaic, Hebrew, Latin)
Ben Hur	2010	miniseries by Steve Shill
Ben-Hur	2016	new American version in 3-D directed by Timur Bekmambetov with Jack Huston as Ben-Hur
In the Name of Ben Hur	2016	an adventure film directed by Mark Atkins, with Adrian Bouchet as Judah Ben Hur
Risen	2016	a biblical drama in Spanish-US coproduction, dir. by Kevin Reynolds with Cliff Curtis featuring Yeshua (Jesus Christ)
The Chosen	2017–2025	a series about the life of Jesus through the eyes of his followers
The Book of Clarence	2023	It follows a struggling down-on-his-luck man named Clarence living in A.D. 33 Jerusalem who looks to capitalize on the rise of Jesus Christ, by claiming to be a new Messiah sent by God, in an attempt to free himself of debt and start a life of glory for himself.
The Resurrection of the Christ: Part One & Part Two	2027	sequels of The Passion of the Christ; both dir. by Mel Gibson, with Jaakko Ohtonen as Jesus Christ

=== Reigns of Caligula and Claudius ===
Title	Release date	Notes
Agrippina	1910	directed by Enrico Guazzoni
Messalina	1924	directed by Enrico Guazzoni
I, Claudius	1937, never completed	with Charles Laughton as Claudius. This is an adaptation of Robert Graves's novels "I, Claudius" and "Claudius the God".
The Affairs of Messalina	1951	Italian production directed by Carmine Gallone, with María Félix as Messalina
Messalina	1960	dir. by Vittorio Cottafavi, with Belinda Lee as Messalina
The Caesars (TV series)	1968	6 episodes: Augustus; Germanicus; Tiberius; Sejanus; Caligula; Claudius
I, Claudius	1976	BBC TV series with Derek Jacobi as Claudius (an adaptation of Robert Graves's novels "I, Claudius" and "Claudius the God").
Messalina, Messalina!	1977	directed by Bruno Corbucci, with Anneka Di Lorenzo as Messalina
Caligola	1979	Italian historical drama with Malcolm McDowell as Caligula (dir. by Tinto Brass)
Caligola... la storia mai raccontata	1982	Italian historical exploitation film produced, directed and shot by Joe D'Amato, starring David Brandon and Laura Gemser
Britannia	2018–2022	British TV series of a fictional account of the Roman conquest of Britain

=== Reign of Nero ===
Title	Release date	Notes
Quo Vadis	1901	the earliest adaptation made by Lucien Nonguet and Ferdinand Zecca
Quo Vadis	1913	the second silent version directed by Enrico Guazzoni
Quo Vadis	1924	Italian production directed by Georg Jacoby and Gabriellino D'Annunzio, with Emil Jannings as Nero
The Sign of the Cross	1932	with Charles Laughton as Nero
Fiddlers Three	1944	British production, starring Tommy Trinder, Sonnie Hale and Francis L. Sullivan as the Emperor Nero
Quo Vadis	1951	American production with Peter Ustinov as Nero (dir. by Mervyn LeRoy)
Nero and the Burning of Rome	1953	directed by Primo Zeglio
The Silver Chalice	1954	starring Paul Newman (dir. by Victor Saville)
Nero's Mistress	1956	Italian comedy film directed by Steno
The Ten Gladiators	1963	Italian film directed by Gianfranco Parolini
Roamin' Roman	1964	cartoon short in which Woody Woodpecker encounters Nero, directed by Paul J. Smith
Challenge of the Gladiator	1965	Italian film directed by Domenico Paolella
The Strongest Slaves in the World (Gli schiavi più forti del mondo)	1965	Italian film directed by Michele Lupo
Fire Over Rome	1965	Italian film directed by Guido Malatesta
The Romans	1965	classic Doctor Who season 2 ep. 4
Fellini Satyricon	1969	fantasy drama loosely based on Petronius's work (dir. by Federico Fellini)
Satyricon	1969	fantasy drama based on Petronius's work (dir. by Gian Luigi Polidoro)
Quo Vadis	1985	TV miniseries directed by Franco Rossi
Quo Vadis	2001	Polish superproduction directed by Jerzy Kawalerowicz
Quo Vadis	2002	TV six-part series following the main Polish production
Nero	2004	AKA "Imperium: Nero", part of the Imperium series. Directed by Paul Marcus
Nero (Ancient Rome: The Rise and Fall of an Empire – Episode Two)	2006	docudrama about reign of Nero
Seneca – Oder: Über die Geburt von Erdbeben	2023	German biographical drama directed by Robert Schwentke, with John Malkovich as Seneca

=== Boudica's Revolt ===
Title	Release date	Notes
The Viking Queen	1967	film loosely based on the revolt of Boudica
Warrior Queen	1978	TV series about the revolt of Boudica
Boudica	2003	film about the revolt of Boudica
Boudica	2023	film about the revolt of Boudica

=== Eruption of Mount Vesuvius ===
Title	Release date	Notes
The Last Days of Pompeii - Gli ultimi giorni di Pompei	1913	a silent film directed by Mario Caserini and Elioterio Rudolfi
The Last Days of Pompeii - Jone o Gli ultimi giorni de Pompei	1913	a silent film directed by Giovanni Enrico Vidali and Ubaldo Maria Del Colle
The Last Days of Pompeii	1935	American film loosely based on the lord Lytton's novel
The Last Days of Pompeii	1950	French film (dir. by Paolo Moffa)
The Last Days of Pompeii	1959	dir. by Mario Bonnard & Sergio Leone
79 A.D.	1962	written and directed by Gianfranco Parolini and starring Brad Harris
Up Pompeii!	1969–1970	BBC TV Series
Up Pompeii	1971	set in 79 AD, yet anachronistically shows Nero still reigning 10 years after his death (1971)
The Last Days of Pompeii	1984	ABC-TV miniseries
Pompeii: The Last Day	2003	British docudrama (BBC) directed by Peter Nicholson
Imperium: Pompeii	2007	part of the Imperium series
The Fires of Pompeii	2008	new Doctor Who series 4 ep. 2
Pompeii	2014	a romantic disaster film directed by Paul W. S. Anderson

=== Flavian Dynasty ===
Title	Release date	Notes
Gold for the Caesars	1963	During the reign of Domitian
Revolt of the Praetorians	1964	directed by Alfonso Brescia in his directorial debut and starred Richard Harrison
The Dacians	1967	Romanian film about Domitian's Dacian War, with Pierre Brice (dir. by Sergiu Nicolaescu)
Masada	1981	TV miniseries about the siege of Masada in the First Jewish-Roman War, dir. by Boris Sagal
Age of Treason	1993	A fictitious story about Marcus Didius Falco (played by Bryan Brown), an "informer" (a proto-private investigator) who navigates the tough back alleys of Rome with the help of gigantic ex-gladiator Justus (played by Matthias Hues), to find the killer of a man whose family was close to the newly enthroned Emperor Vespasian.
The Apocalypse	2000	telefilm about Jesus Christ's last surviving disciple and his writings and visions (dir. by Raffaele Mertes), starring Richard Harris as St John of Patras and Bruce Payne as Domitian
Rebellion (Ancient Rome: The Rise and Fall of an Empire – Episode Three)	2006	docudrama about First Jewish–Roman War
Roman Mysteries	2007–2008	ten-part TV series for youngsters, directed by Paul Marcus
Those About to Die	2024	The series chronicles the world of gladiators in Ancient Rome

=== Reign of Trajan ===
Title	Release date	Notes
The Column	1968	Romanian film about Trajan's Dacian Wars (dir. by Mircea Dragan)

=== Reign of Hadrian ===
Title	Release date	Notes
Le schiave di Cartagine	1956	directed by Guido Brignone
The Eagle of the Ninth	1977	a six-part BBC mini-series, based on the novel by Rosemary Sutcliff, starring Anthony Higgins
Centurion	2010	an action film based on the massacre of the Ninth Legion, directed by Neil Marshall
The Eagle	2011	adaption of the novel The Eagle of the Ninth by Rosemary Sutcliff, directed by Kevin Macdonald

=== Reign of Antoninus Pius ===
Title	Release date	Notes
Androcles and the Lion	1952	set in 161 AD, after the play by George Bernard Shaw

=== Reign of Commodus ===
Title	Release date	Notes
The Rebel Gladiators	1962	directed by Domenico Paolella
Maciste, il gladiatore più forte del mond	1962	Italian film directed by Michele Lupo
The Fall of the Roman Empire	1964	latter half set in Rome, with Christopher Plummer as Commodus (dir. by Anthony Mann)
The Two Gladiators	1964	Italian prequel of the next one, dir. by Mario Caiano
Sword of the Empire	1964	Italian peplum film directed by Sergio Grieco.
Gladiator	2000	latter half set in Rome, partly a remake of The Fall of the Roman Empire (dir. by Ridley Scott)

=== Severan Dynasty ===
Title	Release date	Notes
Three Swords for Rome	1964	Set during the reign of Elagabalus
Gladiator II	2024	Over two decades after the original events of Gladiator, Lucius—the grandson of Rome's former emperor Marcus Aurelius and son of Lucilla—lives with his wife and child in Numidia. Roman soldiers led by general Marcus Acacius invade, forcing Lucius into slavery. Inspired by the story of Maximus, as depicted in the original 2000 film, Lucius resolves to fight as a gladiator while opposing the rule of the young emperors Caracalla and Geta.

=== Crisis of the Third Century ===
Title	Release date	Notes
Sign of the Gladiator	1959	[known also as Sheba and the Gladiator] – about the Palmyrene Empire of queen Zenobia (starring Anita Ekberg) and its re-annexation back to Rome (dir. by Guido Brignone and Michelangelo Antonioni)
The Magnificent Gladiator	1964	Italian film being a tale of a gladiator from the times of emperor Gallienus (dir. by Alfonso Brescia)

=== Reign of Diocletian ===
Title	Release date	Notes
Sebastiane	1976	Homoerotical version of the legend of St Sebastian; remarkable also as the first film entirely recorded in Latin. Directed by Derek Jarman.

=== 310–315 AD (Age of Constantine) ===
Title	Release date	Notes
The Fighting Gladiators	1949	aka Fabiola Italian film with Michèle Morgan
The Revolt of the Slaves	1960	based on the 1854 novel Fabiola by Nicholas Wiseman.
Constantine and the Cross	1962	up to the Battle of the Milvian Bridge in AD 312, with Cornel Wilde as Constantine the Great
The Fall of Rome	1963	an Italian peplum-film, the story based on persecution of Christians after the death of Emperor Constantine (dir. by Antonio Margheriti)
Constantine (Ancient Rome: The Rise and Fall of an Empire – Episode Five)	2006	docudrama about the rise of Constantine

=== Reign of Julian ===
Title	Release date	Notes
Giuliano l'Apostata	1919	Italian historical drama film directed by Ugo Falena, starring Guido Graziosi and Ileana Leonidoff. Set in the 4th century, it is a biographical film about the Emperor Julian, known as Julian the Apostate for his rejection of Christianity.

=== Attila the Hun ===
Title	Release date	Notes
Attila	1954	with Anthony Quinn as Attila the Hun and Sophia Loren as Justa Grata Honoria
Sign of the Pagan	1954	with Jack Palance as Attila the Hun
Tharus Son of Attila	1962	directed by Roberto Bianchi Montero
Attila	2001	a joint American-Lithuanian production with Gerard Butler as Attila the Hun (dir. by Dick Lowry)

=== Late Empire ===
Title	Release date	Notes
Revenge of the Barbarians	1960	about the sack of Rome by the Visigoths in 410 AD (dir. by Giuseppe Vari)
Revenge of The Gladiators	1964	the Vandal sack of Rome (dir. by Luigi Capuano)
The Last Roman	1968, 1969	on the struggle in Italy ruled by the Ostrogoths, after the novel by Felix Dahn (dir. by Robert Siodmak)
Thais	1984	Polish film (dir. by Ryszard Ber), after a story by Anatole France on an episode from the life of the 4th-century Alexandria
Titus Andronicus	1985	fictional story of a general in the Roman army, based on the tragedy by William Shakespeare; BBC TV version dir. by Jane Howell
Titus	1999	adaptation by Julie Taymor with Anthony Hopkins as Titus Andronicus
King Arthur	2004	
The Voyage Home	2004	based on the poem De reditu suo by Rutilius Claudius Namatianus
The Fall of Rome (Ancient Rome: The Rise and Fall of an Empire – Episode Six)	2006	docudrama about the sack of Rome by Alaric's Visigoths
The Last Legion	2007	loosely inspired by the 5th-century collapse of the Western Roman Empire and the legendary-fantastic elements from the history of Britain (dir. by Doug Lefler), with Colin Firth and Ben Kingsley
Agora	2009	Spanish film (dir. by Alejandro Amenábar) with Rachel Weisz starring as Hypatia, a female philosopher and savant from Alexandria
Restless Heart: The Confessions of Saint Augustine	2010	a biographical film about Augustine of Hippo, dir. by Christian Duguay
Decline of an Empire	2014	about "the Christian saint who defied the Empire" (dir. by Michael Redwood), with Peter O'Toole as Cornelius Gallus (his last film role)

== Undated ==
Title	Release date	Notes
Roman Scandals	1933	Eddie Cantor's dream sequence.
Goliath and the Sins of Babylon	1963	Italian film directed by Michele Lupo
Seven Rebel Gladiators (Sette contro tutti)	1965	Italian film directed by Michele Lupo
A Funny Thing Happened on the Way to the Forum	1966	Film version of the musical play – inspired by the farces of the ancient Roman playwright Plautus B.C.), specifically Pseudolus, Miles Gloriosus and Mostellaria
The Arena	1974	[also known as Naked Warriors] – a story of two female gladiators from the arena of Brundisium, dir. by Steve Carver
History of the World, Part I	1981	the section "The Roman Empire" of this broad satire is set in Rome
Amazons and Gladiators	2001	Australian action/adventure film of Roman times (dir. by Zachary Weintraub)

- List of fiction set in ancient Rome for a comprehensive list of all works of fiction (including films set in ancient Rome)
- List of fiction set in ancient Greece
- Lists of historical films
- List of films set in ancient Egypt
- List of films set in ancient Greece
- List of films based on classical mythology
- List of Asterix films
