= List of films set in ancient Greece =

This article lists films and tv shows set in ancient Greece, including Magna Graecia and Hellenistic kingdoms.

== Bronze Age and mythistoricals ==
Title	Release date	Notes
Amphitryon	1935	
Antigone	1961	
Atlas in the Land of the Cyclops	1961	Peplum film
Atlantis	2013-2015	In the show, submarine pilot Jason washes up on the shores of legendary Atlantis and must navigate the powerful leaders of the mythological realm.
Blood of Zeus	2020-2025	Chronicles the illegitimate Heron son of Zeus, a young man tasked with saving heaven and earth despite the interference of a vengeful goddess and her monstrous forces.
Clash of the Titans	1981	A film about Greek mythology, with many monsters brought to life through special effects.
Clash of the Titans	2010	
Colossus and the Amazon Queen	1960	Peplum film
Electra	1962	
Gods School	2018-	On Mount Olympus, a controversial young goddess tries to find her place among other gods and goddesses, until she meets a young mortal.
Goliath and the Dragon	1960	Peplum film
Helen of Troy	1956	
Helen of Troy	2003	
Helena	1924	
Hercules	1958	Its success paved the way for the dozens of 1960s peplum (or "sword and sandal") films
Hercules	1983	
Hercules	1997	Animated Disney film
Hercules	2014	
Iphigenia	1977	
Immortals	2011	
Jason and the Argonauts	1963	
Minotaur	2006	
Minotaur, the Wild Beast of Crete	1960	Peplum film
My Son, the Hero	1962	Peplum film
Oedipus Rex	1967	
Rape of the Belt	1964	
The Return	2024	The film is a retelling of Homer's Odyssey
Sköna Helena	1951	
The Bacchantes	1961	Peplum film
The Fall of Troy	1911	The first known adaptation of Homer's epic poem, the Iliad.
The Fury of Achilles	1962	Peplum film
The Giants of Thessaly	1960	
The Legend of Hercules	2014	
The Odyssey	1968	
The Odyssey	1997	
The Odyssey	2026	
The Private Life of Helen of Troy	1927	
The Triumph of Hercules	1964	
The Trojan Horse	1961	Peplum film
The Trojan Women	1971	Peplum film
Troy	2004	
Ulysses	1954	
Vulcan, Son of Giove	1962	
Wrath of the Titans	2012	

== Classical Greece ==
Title	Release date	Notes
300	2007	
300: Rise of an Empire	2014	
The 300 Spartans	1962	
Atlas	1961	Peplum film
Barefoot in Athens	1966	
Damon and Pythias	1962	Peplum film
Gladiators Seven	1964	Peplum film
Night in Paradise	1946	
Prologue	2015	
Socrates	1971	
The Giant of Marathon	1959	Peplum film
The Goddess of Love	1957	Peplum film
The Warrior Empress	1960	Peplum film
Timon	1973	

== Hellenistic period ==
Title	Release date	Notes
Alexander	2004	
Alexander the Great	1956	
Cleopatra	1963	It chronicles the struggles of the young queen Cleopatra VII of Egypt to resist the imperial ambitions of Rome.
Goliath and the Rebel Slave	1963	Peplum film
Reign: The Conqueror	1999	
Rome	2005-2007	Follows the Battle of Actium.
Sikandar	1941	
Slave Women of Corinth	1958	
The Centurion	1961	
The Colossus of Rhodes	1961	
The Old Testament	1962	

== See also ==
- List of films set in ancient Rome
- List of films set in ancient Egypt
- List of films based on classical mythology
- List of films based on Greek drama
- List of fiction set in ancient Rome
- List of fiction set in ancient Greece
- Lists of historical films
