= List of films based on Greek drama =

== Films based on plays by Aeschylus ==
Title	Release date	Notes
Hercules Unchained	1959	Italy
The Family Reunion	1959	TV movie, Canada
Les Perses	1961	TV movie, France
Aeschylus	1967	TV movie, Finland
I Persiani	1967	TV movie, Italy
The Forgotten Pistolero	1969	Italy
Agamemnon	1973	Belgium
Orestea	1975	Italy
Atreides	1979	TV movie, Greece
Oresteia	1979	TV mini-series, UK
Prometheus Retrogressing	1998	
Le Rêve Plus Fort que la Mort	2002	France
Die Perser	2003	Germany

== Films based on Sophocles ==
Title	Release date	Notes
Oedipe roi	1908	
Oedipus Rex	1909	
Oedipus Rex	1911	
Oedipus Rex	1957	
Antigone	1960	
Acosados, Los	1960	
Antigone	1961	
Antigone	1962	
Edipo re	1967	
Oedipus the King	1968	
Élo Antigoné	1968	
Antigone	1970	
The Year of the Cannibals	1970	
Elektra	1970	
Antigone	1973	
Antigone	1973	
Antigone	1974	
Antigone	1974	
Oedipus Rex	1975	
Elektra	1981	
Oedipus Rex	1984	
Oedipus the King	1984	
Oedipus at Colonus	1984	
Elettra	1987	
Électre	1987	
Elektra	1989	
Antigone/Rites of Passion	1991	
Oedipus Rex	1992	
Elektra	1994	

== Films based on Euripides ==
Title	Release date	Notes
Medea	1959	United States - TV play of the week
Le Baccanti	1961	Italy
Phaedra	1962	Greece
Electra	1962	Greece
Troyanas, Las	1963	
Medea	1963	
Troerinnen, Die	1966	
Medea	1969	
Dionysus in '69	1970	
The Trojan Women (film)	1971	
Medéia	1973	
Bakchen, Die	1974	
Iphigenia	1977	
A Dream of Passion	1978	Greece
Medea	1983	
Medea	1983	
Medea	1989	
Iphigenia at Aulis	1991	
Backanterna	1993	
Médée	2001	
The Bacchae	2002	
The Trojan Women	2004	
Medea	2005	
The Women of Troy	2006	
The Killing of a Sacred Deer	2017	

== Films based on Aristophanes ==
Title	Release date	Notes
Daughters of Destiny	1954	
The Second Greatest Sex	1955	
Sendung der Lysistrata, Die	1961	
Escuela de seductoras	1962	
An oles oi gynaikes tou kosmou	1967	
Flickorna	1968	
Lysistrate	1982	
Komediya o Lisistrate	1989	
Chi-Raq	2015	

== See also ==
- Fiction set in ancient Rome
- Fiction set in ancient Greece
- List of films based on classical mythology
- List of films based on Germanic mythology
- List of films based on Slavic mythology
- List of films set in ancient Greece
- List of films set in ancient Rome
- List of films set in ancient Egypt
