= Classical tradition =

Reception of classical Greco-Roman antiquity by the post-classical Western world

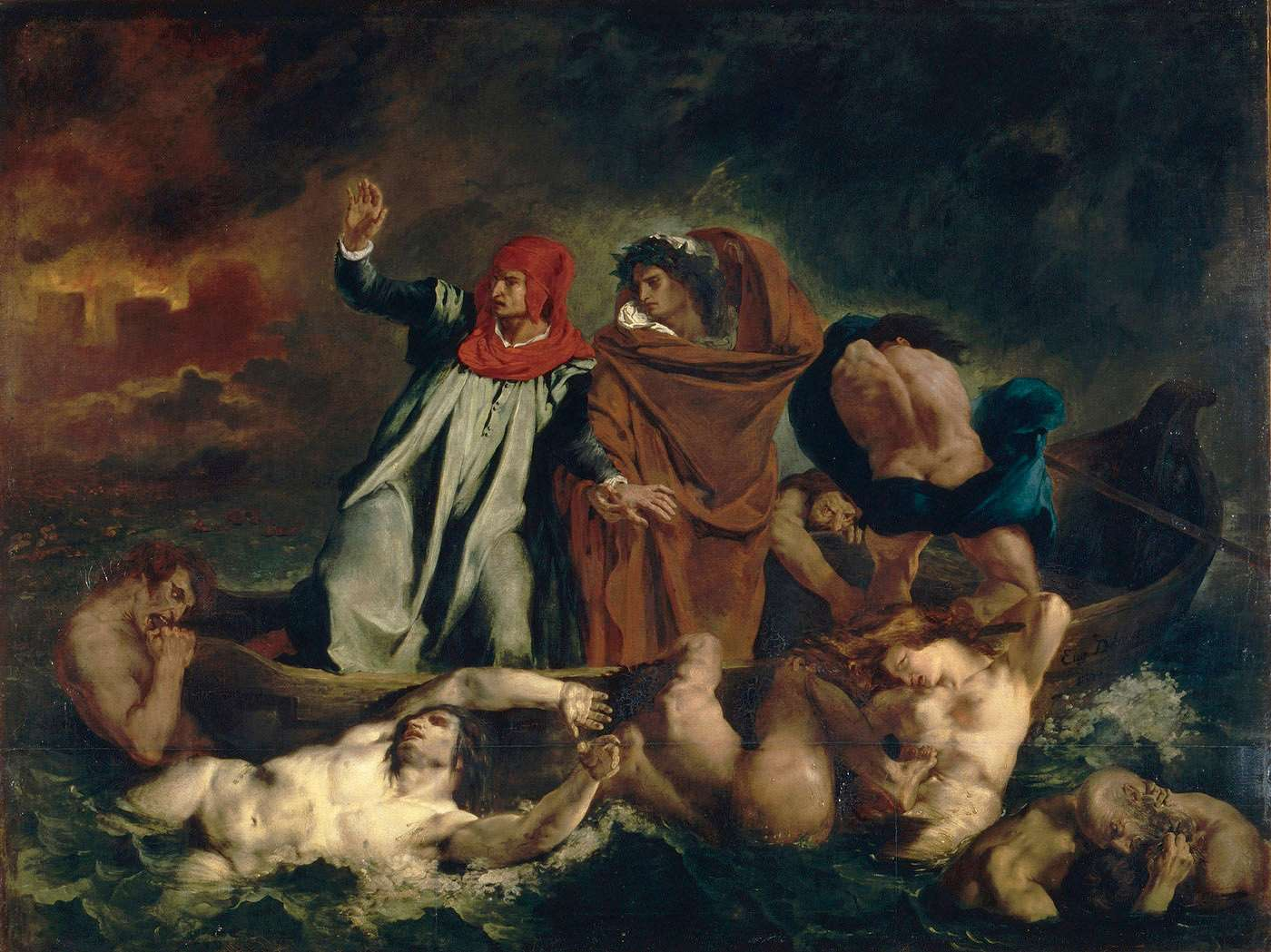
Vergil leading Dante on his journey in the Inferno, an image that dramatizes the continuity of the classical tradition (Dante and Vergil in Hell by Delacroix, 1823)

The Western classical tradition is the reception of classical Greco-Roman antiquity by later cultures, especially the post-classical West, involving texts, imagery, objects, ideas, institutions, monuments, architecture, cultural artifacts, rituals, practices, and sayings. Philosophy, political thought, and mythology are three major examples of how classical culture survives and continues to have influence. The West is one of a number of world cultures regarded as having a classical tradition, including the Indian, Chinese, and Islamic traditions.

The study of the classical tradition differs from classical philology, which seeks to recover "the meanings that ancient texts had in their original contexts." It examines both later efforts to uncover the realities of the Greco-Roman world and "creative misunderstandings" that reinterpret ancient values, ideas and aesthetic models for contemporary use. The classicist and translator Charles Martindale has defined the reception of classical antiquity as "a two-way process ... in which the present and the past are in dialogue with each other."

== History ==
The beginning of a self-conscious classical tradition is usually located in the Renaissance, with the work of Petrarch in 14th-century Italy. Although Petrarch believed that he was recovering an unobstructed view of a classical past that had been obscured for centuries, the classical tradition in fact had continued uninterrupted during the Middle Ages. There was no single moment of rupture when the inhabitants of what was formerly the Roman Empire went to bed in antiquity and awoke in the medieval world; rather, the cultural transformation occurred over centuries. The use and meaning of the classical tradition may seem, however, to change dramatically with the emergence of humanism.

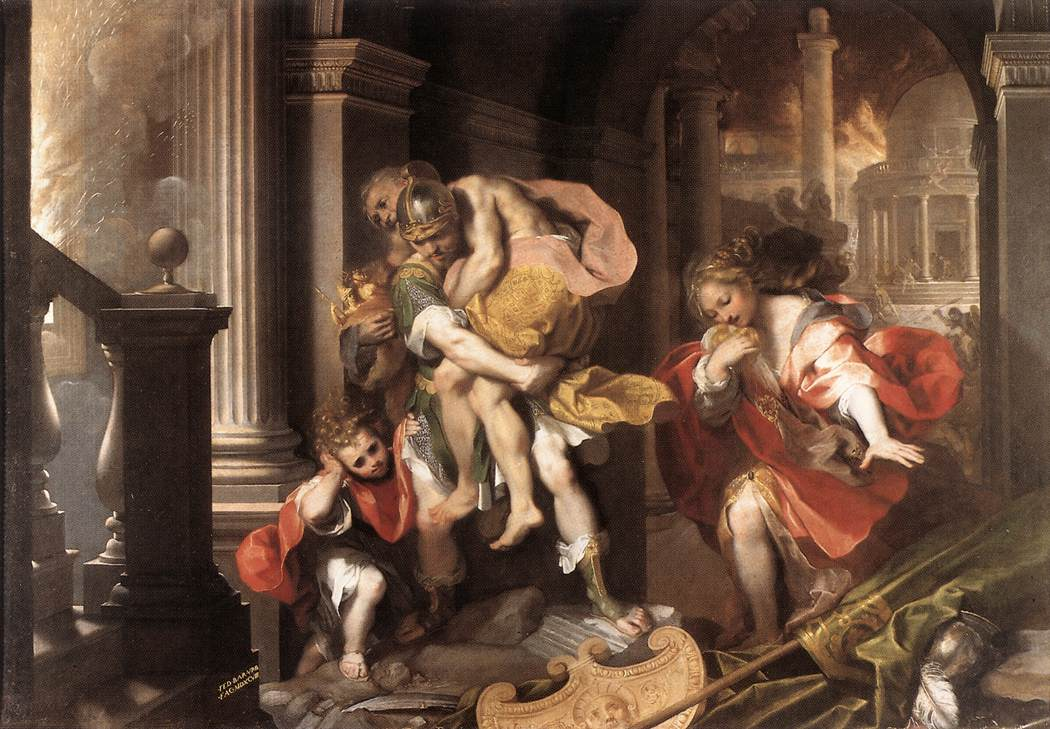
Aeneas carrying his father and leading his son from fallen Troy, a popular image in the Renaissance for the retrieval of the past as a way to make possible the future; the figure of his wife, Creusa, who did not survive, represents that which was lost (Federico Barocci, 1598)

The phrase "classical tradition" is itself a modern label, articulated most notably in the post-World War II era with The Classical Tradition: Greek and Roman Influences on Western Literature of Gilbert Highet (1949) and The Classical Heritage and Its Beneficiaries of R. R. Bolgar (1954). The English word "tradition", and with it the concept of "handing down" classical culture, derives from the Latin verb trado, tradere, traditus, in the sense of "hand over, hand down."

Writers and artists influenced by the classical tradition may name their ancient models, or allude to their works. Often scholars infer classical influence through comparative methods that reveal patterns of thought. Sometimes authors' copies of Greek and Latin texts will contain handwritten annotations that offer direct evidence of how they read and understood their classical models; for instance, in the late 20th century the discovery of Montaigne's copy of Lucretius enabled scholars to document an influence that had long been recognized.

== See also ==
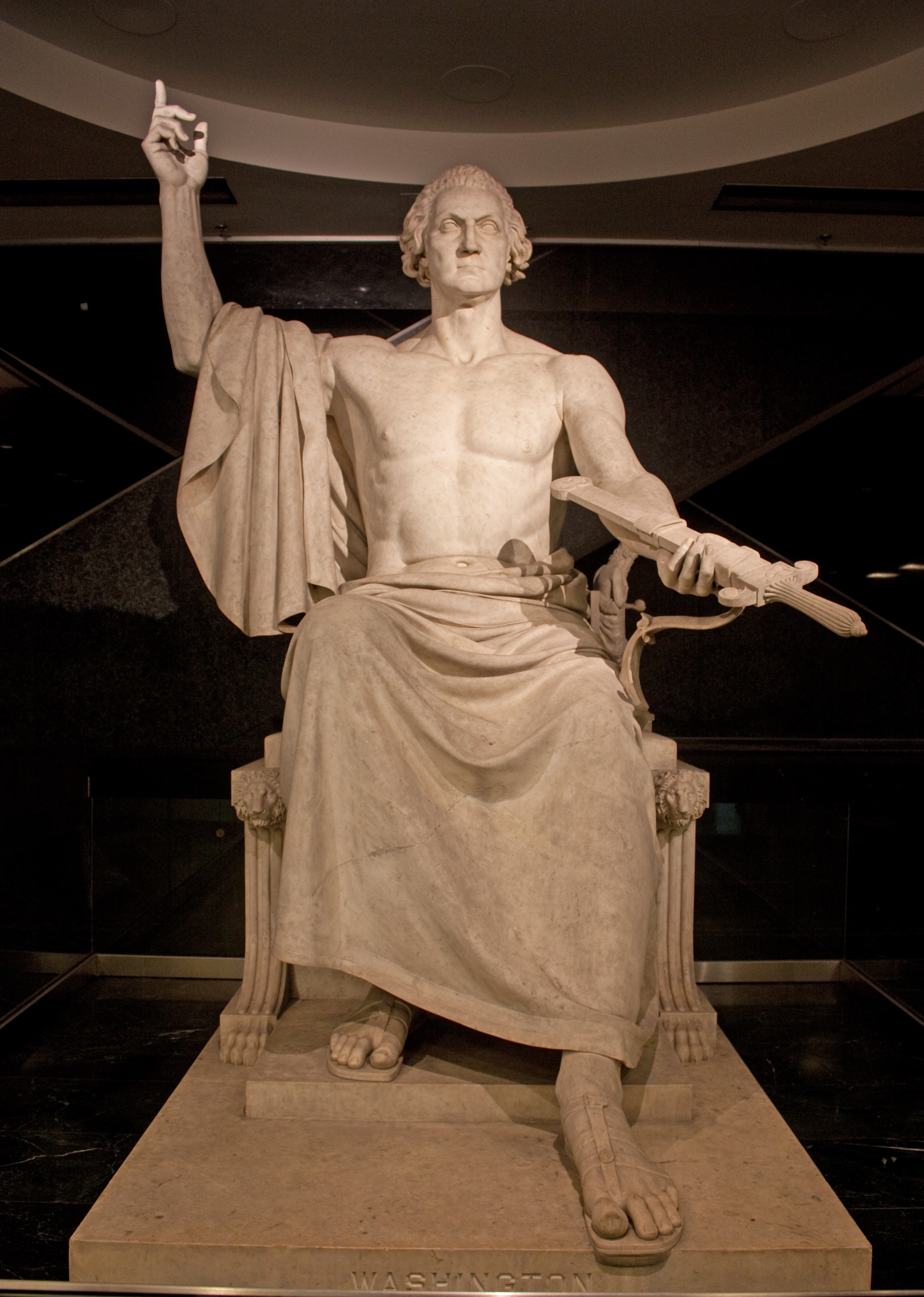
Horatio Greenough's George Washington (1840), modeled after a statue of Zeus

- Classics
- Classical reception studies
- Classical republicanism
- Greek mythology in western art and literature
- Legacy of the Roman Empire
- List of films based on Greco-Roman mythology
- List of films based on Greek drama
- Matter of Rome
- Neoclassicism
- Hellenocentrism
- Quarrel of the Ancients and the Moderns
- Transmission of the Classics
- Ancient Egypt in the Western imagination
- Symbolism of domes
