= Vesna (mythology) =

Slavic mythological being

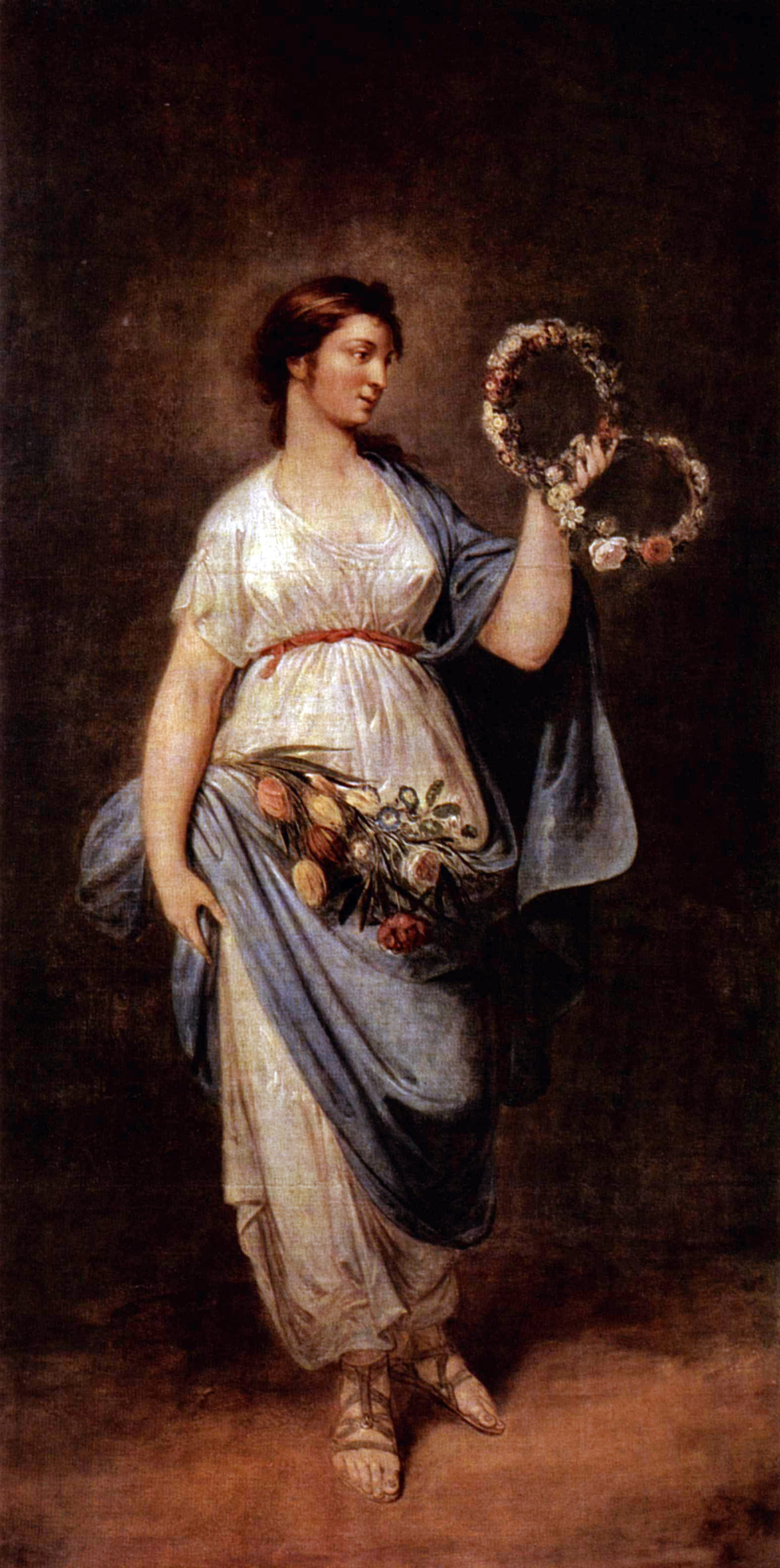
Bernhard Rode's 1785 painting Allegory of Spring.

Vesna (Cyrillic: Весна) was a mythological female character associated with youth and springtime in later Slavic mythology, particularly in the South Slavs. Along with her male companion Vesnik, she was associated with rituals conducted in rural areas during springtime.

== In mythology ==
According to Slovene mythology, beautiful women called "vesnas" lived in palaces atop mountains where they discussed the fate of crops and of human inhabitants. A magical circle around their palaces kept them from leaving the mountain top except during February, when they would travel in wooden carts down to the valley below. Only certain people were capable of hearing them singing. People who snuck up to their mountain palaces might learn their fates, but risked an unpleasant end if they were caught by the vesnas.

It has been suggested that Vesna was originally a goddess representing the earth during the spring, making her an alternate form of Mokosh.

The character was documented in Croatia, Serbia, North Macedonia and Slovenia.

According to English author G. F. Abbott, Russian peasants from the 19th century celebrated the return of spring on March 1 by going out to the fields, carrying a clay figure of a lark on a pivot which had been decorated with flowers and singing songs about springtime ("the vernal season"), or vesna, a word for 'spring' inherited in Russian, Polish, Ukrainian, and Belarusian from Proto-Slavic *vesna.

== Legacy ==
Today it is the poetic word for 'spring' in Slovene (where February is occasionally known as vesnar), Croatian, Czech and Slovak. In Serbo-Croatian variants, the word v(j)esnik (ultimately derived from Proto-Slavic *věstь, "message") is used to denote someone or something that heralds an upcoming event, commonly used in the collocation v(j)esnici proljeća ("heralds of spring") denoting early-blooming flowers such as snowdrops, crocuses and primulas.

The term is also used in the feminine name Vesna.

== In popular culture ==
- The story of Vesna and the Sun Prince gave inspiration to the 1983 Czechoslovak short film A Ballad About Green Wood, directed by Jiří Barta.
- Vesna was featured on a Slovenian postage stamp that was sold in 80.000 units between 2005 and 2006.
