= List of films set in ancient Egypt =

This article lists films set in ancient Egypt. This also includes mythological films and films only partially set in ancient Egypt.

== 1890s ==
Year	Title	Director	Notes
1899	Cléopâtre	Georges Méliès	The earliest known version considered to be lost, retrieved 2005.

== 1900s ==
Year	Title	Director	Notes
1908	Antony and Cleopatra	J. Stuart Blackton	It was the first film to dramatize the ill-fated romance between Mark Antony and Cleopatra VII of Egypt.

== 1910s ==
Year	Title	Director	Notes
1910	Cléopâtre	Henri Andréani and Ferdinand Zecca	French film
1912	Cleopatra	Charles L. Gaskill	New silent version after the play of Victorien Sardou.
1913	Antony and Cleopatra	Enrico Guazzoni	Italian production.
1917	Cleopatra	J. Gordon Edwards	American film with Theda Bara as Cleopatra

== 1920s ==
Year	Title	Director	Notes
1922	The Loves of Pharaoh	Ernst Lubitsch	
1923	The Ten Commandments	Cecil B. DeMille	
1924	The Moon of Israel	Michael Curtiz	
1928	Cleopatra	Roy William Neill	

== 1930s ==
Year	Title	Director	Notes
1932	The Mummy	Karl Freund	
1934	Cleopatra	Cecil B. DeMille	With Claudette Colbert as Cleopatra.
1938	Professor Beware	Elliott Nugent	Harold Lloyd is the protagonist

== 1940s ==
Year	Title	Director	Notes
1940	The Mummy's Hand	Christy Cabanne	
1944	The Mummy's Curse	Leslie Goodwins	
1945	Sudan	John Rawlins	
1945	Caesar and Cleopatra	Gabriel Pascal	With Vivien Leigh as Cleopatra and Claude Rains as Julius Caesar, after the play by G. B. Shaw.
1948	Mummy's Dummies	Edward Bernds	

== 1950s ==
Year	Title	Director	Notes
1953	Aida		
1953	Serpent of the Nile	William Castle	With Rhonda Fleming as Cleopatra.
1954	Two Nights with Cleopatra		
1954	The Egyptian		
1955	Land of the Pharaohs		
1956	The Ten Commandments	Cecil B. DeMille	Remake or expanded version of DeMille’s own 1923 film
1957	The Story of Mankind		
1959	Legions of the Nile	Vittorio Cottafavi	Italian film

== 1960s ==
Year	Title	Director	Notes
1960	Cleopatra's Daughter		Il sepolcro dei re
1960	Giuseppe venduto dai fratelli		
1960	Son of Samson		
1960	The Pharaohs' Woman		
1961	Nefertiti, regina del Nilo		
1962	Toto vs. Maciste		
1962	A Queen for Caesar	Piero Pierotti and Victor Tourjansky	Italian film, starring Pascale Petit
1963	Cleopatra	Joseph L. Mankiewicz	With Elizabeth Taylor as Cleopatra, Richard Burton as Mark Antony and Rex Harrison as Julius Caesar.
1963	Toto and Cleopatra		
1964	Carry On Cleo	Gerald Thomas	a parody of J. Mankiewicz's Cleopatra with Sid James as Mark Antony, set in the reign of Julius Caesar
1964	The Lion of Thebes		
1965	Willy McBean and His Magic Machine		
1966	Pharaoh		
1968	Astérix et Cléopâtre	René Goscinny and Albert Uderzo	Belgian-French animated film

== 1970s ==
Year	Title	Director	Notes
1970	Cleopatra		
1972	Antony and Cleopatra	Charlton Heston	A film starring Charlton Heston and Hildegarde Neil.
1974	Antony and Cleopatra		A television version of a Royal Shakespeare Company production starring Richard Johnson and Janet Suzman.
1974	Moses the Lawgiver		

== 1980s ==
Year	Title	Director	Notes
1980	The Awakening	Mike Newell	
1980	The Curse of King Tut's Tomb		
1981	Dawn of the Mummy (1981 film)		
1981	Sphinx	Franklin J. Schaffner	
1981	Antony and Cleopatra		A television version produced as part of the BBC Television Shakespeare starring Colin Blakely and Jane Lapotaire.
1983	The Cleopatras	John Frankau	BBC TV 8-episode series on the latter part of the reign of the Ptolemaic dynasty.
1985	Asterix Versus Caesar		
1987	Aida		

== 1990s ==
Year	Title	Director	Notes
1994	The Emigrant	Youssef Chahine	
1995	Joseph		
1995	Moses (film)		
1995	Slave of Dreams		
1998	The Prince of Egypt		Set in Ancient Egypt, during the reign of Ramesses II, a member of the Nineteenth Dynasty of Egypt. The film is based on the founding narrative of the Exodus, as depicted in the books of Exodus, Leviticus, Numbers, and Deuteronomy.
1999	Astérix et Obélix contre César		
1999	Cleopatra	Franc Roddam	miniseries with Leonor Varela as Cleopatra and Timothy Dalton as Julius Caesar, based on the book by Margaret George
1999	The Mummy		

== 2000s ==
Year	Title	Director	Notes
2000	In the Beginning		miniseries
2000	Joseph: King of Dreams		
2000	Princes and Princesses		
2000	Reign: The Conqueror		
2001	The Mummy Returns		
2002	Astérix & Obélix: Mission Cléopâtre		a French/Italian film based on Goscinny and Uderzo's 1963 comic-book Asterix and Cleopatra.
2002	Building the Great Pyramid		documentary
2002	The Scorpion King		
2005	Legion of the Dead		
2006	The Curse of King Tut's Tomb		
2006	The Ten Commandments		miniseries
2007	Cleopatra	Júlio Bressane	Brazilian film with Alessandra Negrini as Cleopatra and Miguel Falabella as Julius Caesar.
2007	La Reine Soleil		
2007	Sands of Oblivion		
2007	The Ten Commandments		
2008	The Scorpion King 2: Rise of a Warrior		
2009	Agora	Alejandro Amenábar	

== 2010s ==
Year	Title	Director	Notes
2010	The Extraordinary Adventures of Adèle Blanc-Sec	Luc Besson	Les Aventures extraordinaires d'Adèle Blanc-Sec
2011	The Tragedy of Man (film)		
2012	The Scorpion King 3: Battle for Redemption		
2013	The Bible		
2014	Decline of an Empire		
2014	Exodus: Gods and Kings	Ridley Scott	Set in Ancient Egypt, during the reign of Ramesses II, a member of the Nineteenth Dynasty of Egypt. The film is based on the founding narrative of the Exodus, as depicted in the books of Exodus, Leviticus, Numbers, and Deuteronomy.
2014	Mr. Peabody & Sherman		
2015	A.D. The Bible Continues		
2015	Antony and Cleopatra		
2015	The Scorpion King 4: Quest for Power		
2016	Gods of Egypt	Alex Proyas	
2016	The Young Messiah		
2016	X-Men: Apocalypse	Bryan Singer	
2017	The Mummy		

== See also ==
- List of fiction set in ancient Rome
- List of fiction set in ancient Greece
- Lists of historical films
- List of films based on classical mythology
