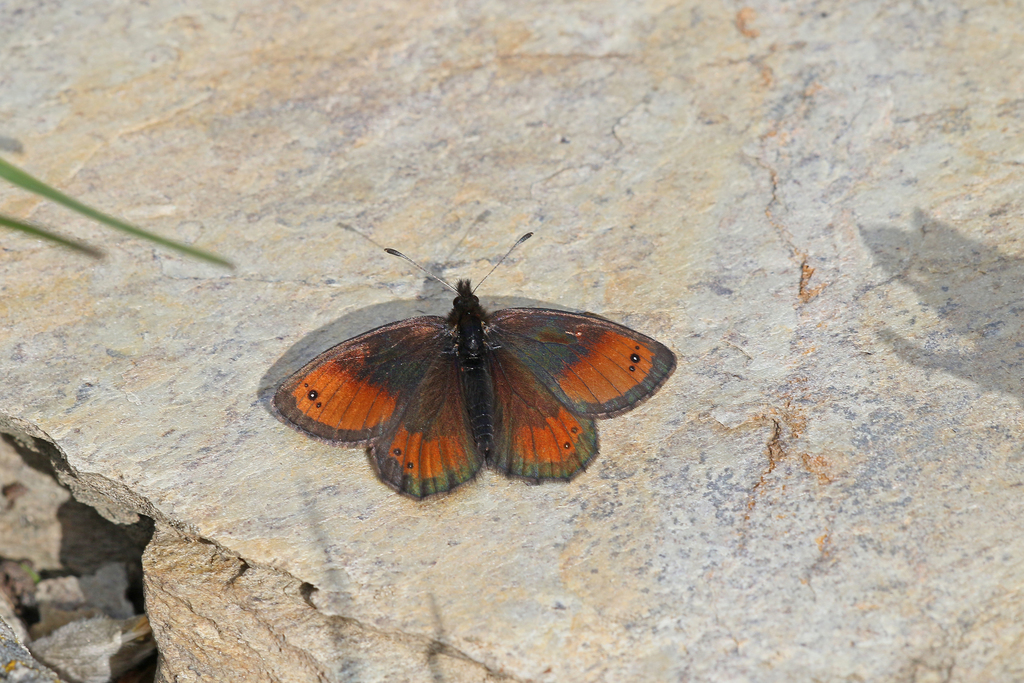

Scientific classification
- Kingdom: Animalia
- Phylum: Arthropoda
- Clade: Pancrustacea
- Class: Insecta
- Order: Lepidoptera
- Family: Nymphalidae
- Genus: Erebia
- Species: E. gorge

Binomial name
- Erebia gorge (Hübner, [1803-1804])

= Silky ringlet =

Species of butterfly

The silky ringlet (Erebia gorge) is a member of the subfamily Satyrinae of the family Nymphalidae. It is a high-altitude butterfly found on screes in the Alps, Pyrenees, central Italy and the Balkans. It is a very variable butterfly.

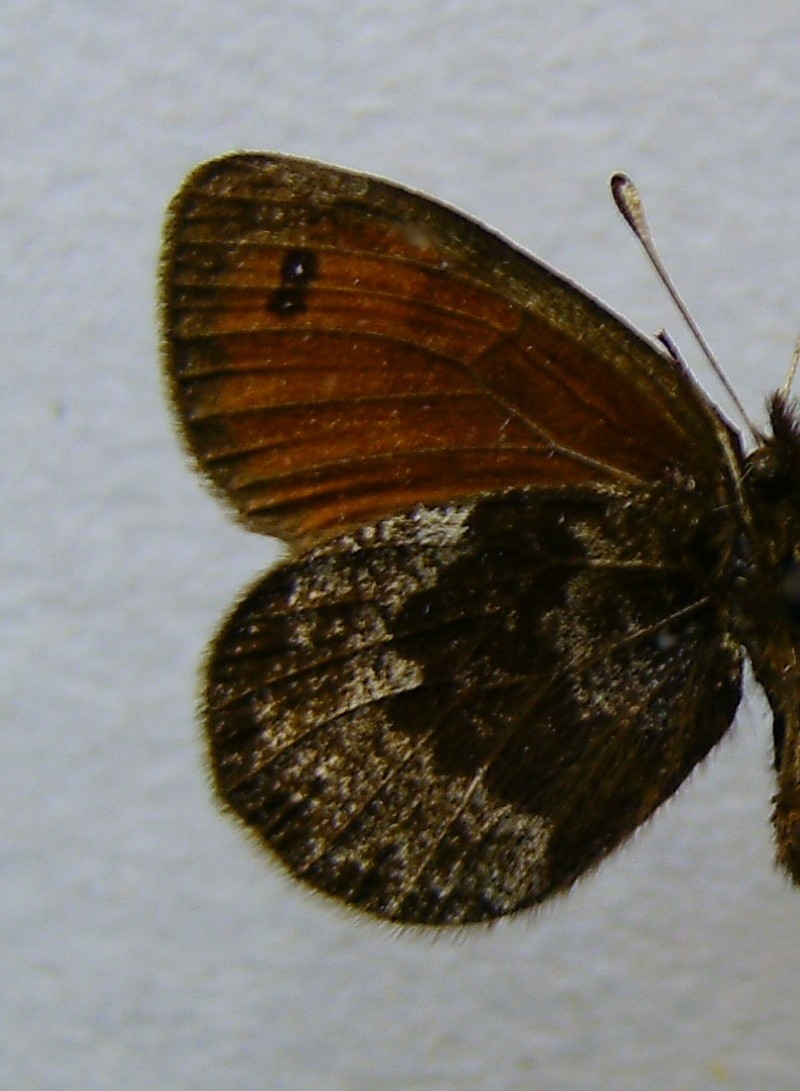
Underside

== Description in Seitz ==
E. gorge Esp. (= aethiops minor Esp.) (37 d). The wings are somewhat narrower and less rounded than in gorgone the hindwing being distinctly angulate and in the female feebly dentate. The russet submarginal band of the forewing is rather broad and extends usually to the hindmargin. In the band there are costally 2 pupillated ocelli placed somewhat obliquely towards each other, and in the female united. In this sex, more rarely in the male, there is sometimes a small third ocellus towards the hindmargin or a black dot instead. The band of the hindwing is narrower and bears 3—4 white-centred ocelli. The forewing beneath is russet-brown, the fore and distal margins being black-brown, sometimes thinly dusted with whitish grey. The hindwing beneath black-brown, being marmorated with white-grey; the distal band is of a more or less light colour, bearing sometimes 3 black eye-dots, which have rarely white centres. The female is hardly different, being only lighter in colour, the underside of the hindwing grey, dusted with brown, with a dark middle band which is dentate on its distal side. Widely distributed in the higher Alps, but occurring only from the tree-line upwards. — ab. erynis Esp. (37 d) is a rarely occurring aberration in which the ocelli are either absent or are but vestigial. In the southern Central and Eastern Alps and in the Abruzzi — ab. triopes Spr. is found among the nymotypical form as single specimens, being more frequent in the Eastern Alps and dominating at the road of the Stilfser Joch, where name-typical occurs but rarely. In the distal band of the forewing there are regularly 3 large white-centred ocelli, which are usually merged. Towards the hindmargin — but not always — there are, shifted towards the distal margin, 2 more somewhat smaller ocelli, which are also visible on the underside. The hindwing has usually 4 brightly white-centred ocelli, which are somewhat smaller beneath. — gigantea Oberth. is a very large form, being otherwise hardly different from the first-described form. From the high mountains of Spain. — gorge is a lively butterfly which flies about rather fast in the sunshine notwithstanding the cold air of the immense altitude of its flight-places, and likes to settle with the wings half open on the boulders warmed by the sun. The insect is somewhat more shy than most Erebias, but does not easily fly off. The specimen chased by the collector, however, is often blown away by the strong breeze on the mountain, being carried downwards and then slowly returning on the lee-side towards the summit of the mountain. Sometimes it is blown on the snow, where it often remains lying a long while. Plentiful in its flight-places, nothing, however, being known of its early stages.

== Etymology ==
Named in the Classical tradition. Gorga in Greek mythology is the daughter of the king of Aetolia Oineus and Alpheus, the mother of Tydeus, one of the participants in the campaign of the "seven against Thebes."

== Genome ==
The genome of E. gorge is composed of 21 chromosomes including the sex chromosomes, Z and W. Two haplotype assemblies were recovered, consisting of 530.78 megabases and 452.25 megabases each.

== Larval host plants ==
E. gorge caterpillars feed on Festuca, Sesleria and Poa species of grasses (Poaceae).
