= Classical mythology =

Study of myths of the Greeks and Romans

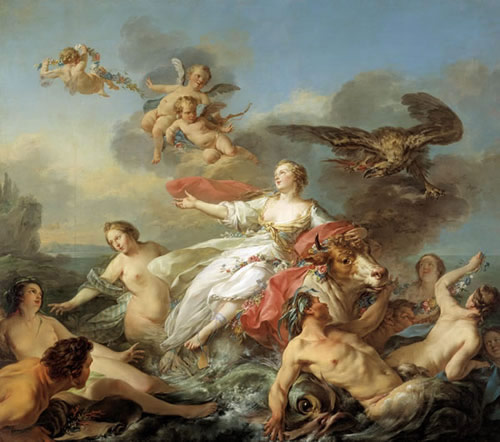
Le Rapt d'Europe ("The Abduction of Europa," 1750) by Jean-Baptiste Marie Pierre (Dallas Museum of Art)

Classical mythology, also known as Greco-Roman mythology or Greek and Roman mythology, is the collective body and study of myths from the ancient Greeks and ancient Romans. Mythology, along with philosophy and political thought, is one of the major survivals of classical antiquity throughout later, including modern, Western culture. The Greek word mythos refers to the spoken word or speech, but it also denotes a tale, story or narrative.

As late as the Roman conquest of Greece during the last two centuries Before the Common Era and for centuries afterwards, the Romans, who already had gods of their own, adopted many mythic narratives directly from the Greeks while preserving their own Roman (Latin) names for the gods. As a result, the actions of many Roman and Greek deities became equivalent in storytelling and literature in modern Western culture. For example, the Roman sky god Jupiter or Jove became equated with his Greek counterpart Zeus; the Roman fertility goddess Venus with the Greek goddess Aphrodite; and the Roman sea god Neptune with the Greek god Poseidon.

Latin remained the dominant language in Europe during the Middle Ages and Renaissance, largely due to the widespread influence of the Roman Empire. During this period, mythological names almost always appeared in their Latin form. However, in the 19th century, there was a shift towards the use of either the Greek or Roman names. For example, "Zeus" and "Jupiter" both became widely used in that century as the name of the supreme god of the classical pantheon.

== Classical myth ==
The stories and characters found in Greco-Roman mythology are not considered real in terms of the same way that historical or scientific facts are real. They are not factual accounts of events that occurred. Instead, Greco-Roman mythology is a collection of ancient stories, legends, and beliefs that were created by the people of ancient Greece and Rome to explain aspects of the world around them, express cultural values, and provide a framework for understanding their existence. These myths often involve gods, heroes, goddesses, afterwar appearances, and other supernatural beings, and they were an integral part of the religious and cultural practices of the time. While these myths are not considered historically accurate, they hold cultural and literary significance.

Greek myths were narratives related to ancient Greek religion, often concerned with the actions of gods and other supernatural beings and of heroes who transcend human bounds. Major sources for Greek myths include the Homeric epics, that is, the Iliad and the Odyssey, and the tragedies of Aeschylus, Sophocles, and Euripides. Known versions are mostly preserved in sophisticated literary works shaped by the artistry of individuals and by the conventions of genre, or in vase painting and other forms of visual art. In these forms, mythological narratives often serve purposes that are not primarily religious, such as entertainment and even comedy (The Frogs), or the exploration of social issues (Antigone).

Roman myths are traditional stories pertaining to ancient Rome's legendary origins, religious institutions, and moral models, with a focus on human actors and only occasional intervention from deities but a pervasive sense of divinely ordered destiny. Roman myths have a dynamic relation to Roman historiography, as in the early books of Livy's Ab urbe condita. The most famous Roman myth may be the birth of Romulus and Remus and the founding of the city, in which fratricide can be taken as expressing the long history of political division in the Roman Republic.

As late as the Hellenistic period of Greek influence and primarily through the Roman conquest of Greece, the Romans identified their own gods with those of the Greeks, keeping their own Roman names but adopting the Greek stories told about them (see interpretatio graeca) and importing other myths for which they had no counterpart. For instance, while the Greek god Ares and the Italic god Mars are both war deities, the role of each in his society and its religious practices differed often strikingly; but in literature and Roman art, the Romans reinterpreted stories about Ares under the name of Mars. The literary collection of Greco-Roman myths with the greatest influence on later Western culture was the Metamorphoses of the Augustan poet Ovid.

Syncretized versions form the classical tradition of mythography, and by the time of the influential Renaissance mythographer Natalis Comes (16th century), few if any distinctions were made between Greek and Roman myths. The myths as they appear in popular culture of the 20th and 21st centuries often have only a tangential relation to the stories as told in ancient Greek and Latin literature.

The people living in the Renaissance era, who primarily studied the Christian teachings, Classical mythology found a way to be told from the freshly found ancient sources that authors and directors used for plays and stories for the retelling of these myths.

Professor John Th. Honti stated that "many myths of Graeco-Roman antiquity" show "a nucleus" that appear in "some later common European folk-tale".

Mythology was not the only borrowing that the Romans made from Greek culture. Rome took over and adapted many categories of Greek culture: philosophy, rhetoric, history, epic, tragedy and their forms of art. In these areas, and more, Rome took over and developed the Greek originals for their own needs. Some scholars argue that the reason for this "borrowing" is largely, among many other things, the chronology of the two cultures. Professor Elizabeth Vandiver says Greece was the first culture in the Mediterranean, then Rome second.

== See also ==
=== Related topics ===
- Chariot clock
- Classical tradition
- Classics
- Greco-Roman world
- Greek mythology in western art and literature
- LGBT themes in classical mythology
- List of films based on classical mythology
- List of films based on Greek drama
- Matter of Rome
- Mythology of Italy
- Natale Conti, influential Renaissance mythographer
- Proto-Indo-European religion
- Vatican Mythographers

=== Classical mythology categories ===
- Classical mythology in popular culture
- Ancient Greece in art and culture
- Works based on classical mythology
- Classical mythology in DC Comics
- Classical mythology in Marvel Comics

=== On individual myths or figures ===
- Ares in popular culture
- Prometheus in popular culture
