= The Silver Cliff =

2011 film

- Film poster
- Directed by: Karim Aïnouz
- Written by: Beatriz Bracher
- Produced by: Rodrigo Teixeira
- Starring: Alessandra Negrini; Camilla Amado; Carla Ribas; Gabi Pereira; Otto Jr.
- Cinematography: Mauro Pinheiro Jr.
- Release dates: 17 May 2011 (Cannes); 26 April 2013 (Brazil)
- Running time: 83 minutes
- Country: Brazil
- Language: Portuguese

The Silver Cliff (Portuguese: O Abismo Prateado) is a 2011 Brazilian drama film directed by Karim Aïnouz. Alessandra Negrini won the Best Actress prize on the Havana Film Festival for her role.

== Plot ==
Violeta (Alessandra Negrini), a married dentist who has a son, is having a normal working day. While listening to a message left on the phone she panics. The message was by her husband, Djalma (Otto Jr.), who said he was leaving her and going to Porto Alegre. He asks Violeta to not go after him, but she does not follow the advice and tries to travel as soon as possible, to the capital of Rio Grande do Sul.

== Cast ==
- Alessandra Negrini as Violeta
- Camilla Amado as Norma
- Thiago Martins as Nassir
- Otto Jr. as Djalma
- Carla Ribas as Elvira
- Gabi Pereira as Bel
