= Artémis, cœur d'artichaut =

2013 film by Hubert Viel

- Film poster
- Directed by: Hubert Viel
- Written by: Hubert Viel
- Produced by: Hubert Viel
- Starring: Frédérique Barré; Noémie Rosset
- Cinematography: Alice Desplats
- Edited by: Fabrice du Peloux
- Music by: Hubert Viel
- Production company: Artisans du Film
- Release dates: 24 January 2013 (Angers); 25 September 2013 (France)
- Running time: 64 minutes
- Country: France
- Language: French

Artémis, cœur d'artichaut ([aʁ.te.mis kœʁ daʁ.ti.ʃo], "Artemis, artichoke heart") is a 2013 French comedy film directed by Hubert Viel, starring Frédérique Barré and Noémie Rosset. Set in contemporary Normandy, it is about the goddess Artemis who lives as a student and goes on a road trip with her friend Kalie. The film is in black-and-white and stylistically influenced by the French New Wave.

== Plot ==
In an introduction, the film's director explains that the main character was chosen by drawing names from a hat. The name that came up was Artemis, a goddess from Greek mythology. The director introduces himself as the story's omniscient narrator, and throughout the film sometimes intervenes to make characters act in certain ways.

Artemis, the daughter of Zeus and twin sister of Apollo, is a 23-year-old literature student at the University of Caen Normandy. She meets Kalie Steaux (pronounced like Callisto), an exuberant student of performing arts who is looking for a roommate, and Artemis invites her to live in her apartment. Artemis is misanthropic and reluctant about meeting boys, which is in stark contrast to Kalie.

After knowing each other for a few weeks they go on a road trip together. They are nearly arrested for illegally camping on a beach, but Artemis uses a pendant to summon lightning which scares away the policemen. Fernando, a young man Artemis approached after pressure from Kalie, invites them to a concert at a bar and a party in Cherbourg. Artemis tries to converse with Fernando but excuses herself and stays in the bathroom for two hours; when Fernando tries to seduce her, she transforms him into a stag.

Artemis returns home alone and watches a film on her laptop. The narrator explains that she is a virgin and that she admires the women in the films of Howard Hawks, the subject of her thesis, because they use charm as a weapon against men. Kalie returns and slips into bed with Artemis.

== Cast ==
- Frédérique Barré as Artemis
- Noémie Rosset as Kalie Steaux
- Lelio Naccari as Fernando
- Hubert Viel as the omniscient narrator
- Gregaldur as Gregaldur
- Djahiz Gil as the singer

== Production ==
The closing credits name the hymns of Callimachus as the film's source material. Viel was inspired by the fluctuant nature of ancient mythology and drew liberally from the stories of Callisto and Actaeon. An inspiration for the approach to mythology was Carl Jung's idea that the unconscious mind contains archaic myths which people carry with them. Viel has mentioned the directors Éric Rohmer and Hayao Miyazaki as influences for the offbeat and dreamlike storytelling he wanted to achieve. The film Orpheus by Jean Cocteau was also a reference point. Artémis, cœur d'artichaut was shot on Super 8 film and is mostly in black-and-white. Viel said that Super 8 suits it because it is an anachronistic format which he associates with childhood films.

== Reception ==
Artémis, cœur d'artichaut was released in French cinemas on 25 September 2013. Several critics commented on its stylistic debt to the French New Wave. Jérémie Couston of Télérama wrote that the film is full of "Truffautian joy" and described the main characters as "more sassy Rohmer heroines". Amélie Dubois of Les Inrockuptibles placed Viel in a group of new filmmakers influenced by the New Wave, together with Guillaume Brac, Sophie Letourneur and Valérie Donzelli; Dubois wrote that Artémis, cœur d'artichaut is set apart by its playful narrative mode and mythological element, but wrote that this has led its creators to include decorative plot elements that fail to add to the cinematic whole. The performances of the two leading actresses—their first major roles—were generally praised, as was the interplay between the main characters. Dubois wrote that the actresses were a "good surprise" with "undeniable charm". Le Monde's Sandrine Marques wrote that their chemistry and the contrast between the two characters have a seductive effect, and praised the film's sense of humour, spontaneity and union of different genres: buddy film, fantastique, road movie, sentimental comedy and portrait of a generation.

== See also ==
- Hawksian woman
- List of films based on Greco-Roman mythology
