= Classical mythology in culture =

Botticelli's Birth of Venus (c. 1485–1486, oil on canvas, Uffizi, Florence); a revived Venus Pudica for a new view of pagan Antiquity, often said to epitomize for modern viewers the spirit of the Renaissance.

With the rediscovery of classical antiquity in the Renaissance, the poetry of Ovid became a major influence on the imagination of poets and artists, and remained a fundamental influence on the diffusion and perception of classical mythology through subsequent centuries. From the early years of the Renaissance, artists portrayed subjects from Greek and Roman mythology alongside more conventional Christian themes. Among the best-known subjects of Italian artists are Botticelli's Birth of Venus and Pallas and the Centaur, the Ledas of Leonardo da Vinci and Michelangelo, and Raphael's Galatea. Through the medium of Latin and the works of Ovid, Greek myth influenced medieval and Renaissance poets such as Petrarch, Boccaccio and Dante in Italy.

In northern Europe, Greek mythology never took the same hold of the visual arts, but its effect was very obvious on literature. Both Latin and Greek classical texts were translated, so that stories of mythology became available. In England, Chaucer, the Elizabethans and John Milton were among those influenced by Greek myths; nearly all the major English poets from Shakespeare to Robert Bridges turned for inspiration to Greek mythology. Jean Racine in France and Goethe in Germany revived Greek drama. Racine reworked the ancient myths – including those of Phaedra, Andromache, Oedipus and Iphigeneia – to new purpose.

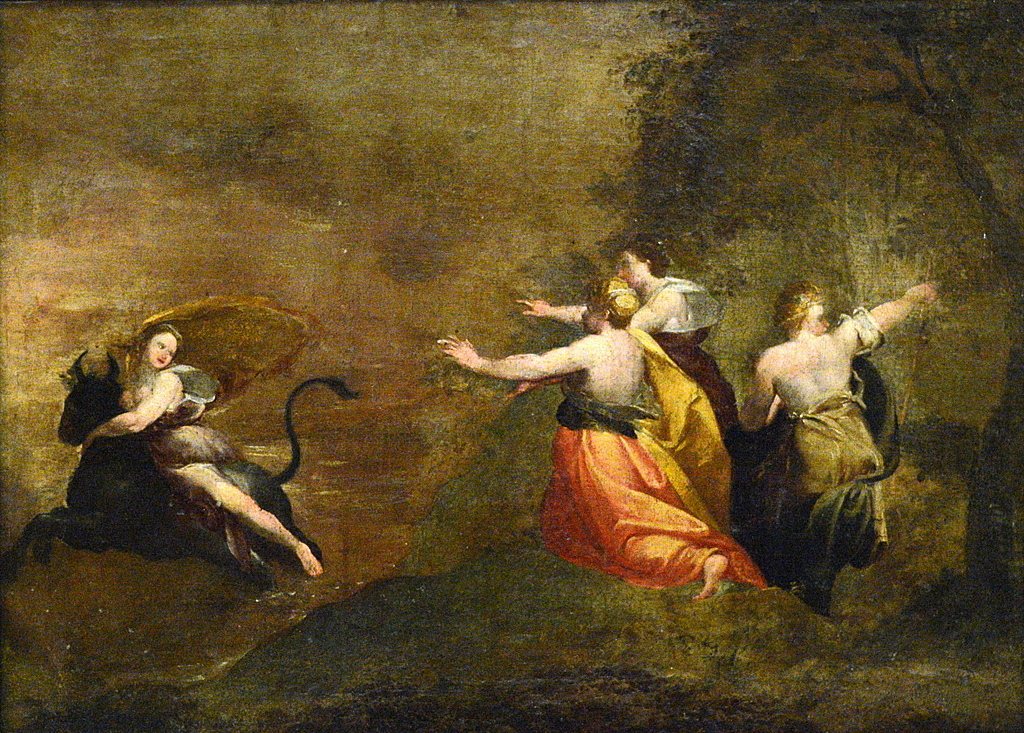
Francisco Goya, The Rape of Europa, 1772

In the 18th century, the philosophical revolution of the Enlightenment spread throughout Europe. It was accompanied by a certain reaction against Greek myth; there was a tendency to insist on the scientific and philosophical achievements of Greece and Rome. The myths, however, continued to provide an important source of raw material for dramatists, including those who wrote the libretti for Handel's operas Admeto and Semele, Mozart's Idomeneo, and Gluck's Iphigénie en Aulide. By the end of the century, Romanticism initiated a surge of enthusiasm for all things Greek, including Greek mythology. In Britain, it was a great period for new translations of Greek tragedies and Homer's works, and these in turn inspired contemporary poets, such as Keats, Byron, and Shelley. The Hellenism of Queen Victoria's poet laureate, Alfred Lord Tennyson, was such that even his portraits of the quintessentially English court of King Arthur are suffused with echoes of the Homeric epics. The visual arts kept pace, stimulated by the purchase of the Parthenon marbles in 1816; many of the "Greek" paintings of Lord Leighton and Lawrence Alma-Tadema were seriously accepted as part of the transmission of the Hellenic ideal.

American authors of the 19th century, such as Thomas Bulfinch and Nathaniel Hawthorne, believed that myths should provide pleasure, and held that the study of the classical myths was essential to the understanding of English and American literature. According to Bulfinch, "The so-called divinities of Olympus have not a single worshipper among living men. They belong now not to the department of theology, but to those of literature and taste." In more recent times, classical themes have been reinterpreted by such major dramatists as Jean Anouilh, Jean Cocteau, and Jean Giraudoux in France, Eugene O'Neill in America, and T. S. Eliot in England, and by great novelists such as the Irish James Joyce and the French André Gide. Richard Strauss, Jacques Offenbach and many others have set Greek mythological themes to music.

== See also ==
- Greek mythology in popular culture
