= Minotaur, the Wild Beast of Crete =

1960 Italian fantasy film by Silvio Amadio

- Directed by: Silvio Amadio
- Screenplay by: Gian Paolo Callegari; Sandro Continenza
- Produced by: Giorgio Agliani; Gino Mordini; Rudolphe Solmesne
- Starring: Bob Mathias; Rosanna Schiaffino; Alberto Lupo; Rik Battaglia
- Cinematography: Aldo Giordani
- Edited by: Nella Nannuzzi
- Music by: Carlo Rustichelli
- Distributed by: United Artists
- Release date: 25 November 1960 (Italy)
- Running time: 105 minutes

Minotaur, the Wild Beast of Crete (Italian: Teseo contro il Minotauro, lit. 'Theseus against the Minotaur') is a 1960 film based on the Greek legend of Theseus, the Athenian hero who is said to have slain a minotaur on Minoan Crete around 1500 or 1450 BC. The film was directed by Silvio Amadio and starred Bob Mathias.

== Plot ==
The island of Crete lives in fear of the Minotaur, a dreadful beast trapped inside a labyrinth under the royal palace. The monster is venerated as a god, and to appease it, the Cretians regularly sacrifice a maiden to it.

One day, Minos' wife Pasiphaë is dying of natural causes. On her deathbed, she reveals that her daughter, the royal princess Phaedra, was not their only child: A twin sister, Ariadne, lives in secrecy on the Greek mainland in a humble village. She was brought there to avoid being sacrificed to the Minotaur, but now the queen's last wish is to see her daughters united again. While Minos consents to his wife's last request, Phaedra, who is a power-hungry and evil schemer, refuses to share the throne and sends out her loyal retainer, Chirone, to kill Ariadne. Chirone raids the village with a group of hired brigands, killing everyone including Ariadne's foster parents, but Ariadne is rescued by Theseus, son of King Aegeus of Athens, and his Cretan friend Demetrios, who happen to pass by. Upon seeing her, Demetrios immediately notices Ariadne's striking resemblance to Princess Phaedra, but Ariadne knows nothing of her true heritage.

Theseus and Ariadne accompany Demetrios back to Crete, but Chirone returns before them, alerting Phaedra to their arrival. Phaedra has her soldiers go after the friends; Ariadne is captured, Demetrios killed, and Theseus is almost slain as well. Rescued by the sea goddess Amphitrite, but refusing her offer to stay with her and become immortal, Theseus returns secretly to Knossos to free Ariadne. Phaedra has meanwhile prepared to dispose of her sister by throwing her into a pit with hungry hyenas, but as Theseus attacks, Phaedra herself ends up in the pit, and to save Theseus, Ariadne is forced to take her sister's place. But Chirone notices that his princess has suddenly changed in her demeanor and reveals his knowledge to Ariadne, but promises to keep her secret as long as she surrenders herself to him.

In the meantime, however, Aegeus, presuming his son to have been murdered, has led a war against Crete and lost. As a tribute, the people of Athens must now surrender a group of young people in regular intervals as sacrifices to the Minotaur. As the first group, which is joined by Theseus, is about to be herded into the labyrinth, Theseus manages to procure a sword and voluntarily enters the labyrinth and slays the Minotaur. Upon Theseus' brave decision, a riot breaks out and Chirone is killed by the mob. Ariadne, who has followed Theseus, helps him out with a thread from her own gown whose other end she had tied to the labyrinth's entrance, and they return alive and to the jubilation of the Cretan people.

== Cast ==
- Bob Mathias as Theseus
- Rosanna Schiaffino as Ariadne/Phaedra
- Alberto Lupo as Chirone
- Rik Battaglia as Demetrios
- Carlo Tamberlani as King Minos
- Nico Pepe as Gerione
- Nerio Bernardi as King Aegeus
- Paul Müller as Medico di Corte
- Tina Lattanzi as Queen Pasiphaë
- Milo Malagoli as The Minotaur

== Release ==
Minotaur, the Wild Beast of Crete was released in Italy on 25 November 1960. It was released in the United States in April 1961. The film was released on home video by Something Weird Video.

== Reception ==
Author and film critic Leonard Maltin awarded the film one and a half out of four stars. In his review on the film, Maltin wrote, "Occasional atmosphere and Schiaffino's appearance still cannot salvage [the] story".

== See also ==
- list of historical drama films
- List of films based on Greco-Roman mythology
- Greek mythology in popular culture
