= The Pied Piper (1986 film) =

- French DVD cover
- Directed by: Jiří Barta
- Screenplay by: Kamil Pixa
- Based on: Pied Piper of Hamelin
- Cinematography: Vladimír Malík; Ivan Vít
- Edited by: Helena Lebdušková
- Music by: Michael Kocáb
- Production companies: Krátký film Praha; Studio Jiřího Trnky Praha
- Distributed by: Ústředni půjčovna filmů filmový kartel
- Release date: 29 July 1986 (Czechoslovakia)
- Running time: 53 minutes
- Countries: Czechoslovakia; West Germany
- Language: Czech

The Pied Piper (Czech: Krysař) is a 1986 Czechoslovak animated dark fantasy film directed by Jiří Barta. The story is an adaptation of the Pied Piper of Hamelin, a fairy tale originated in medieval Germany. The film was screened in the Un Certain Regard section at the 1986 Cannes Film Festival.

== Plot ==
An example of the expressionist art design present in much of the film.

The film starts with the image of a mechanism beginning to work. As the gears move (behind the scenes), the sun slowly rises up over a town and a new day begins. The town, Hamelin, is shown to be one which is full of miserly and petty people, where everything is wasted and money and social rank are the first priority. The waste leads to an enormous rat infestation at night, stealing food and valuables, that spills out into the streets the next day. As the rats wreak havoc in the town, a tall hooded figure watches from afar, then makes his way towards the town. As the town leaders meet to decide on the best course of action, the hooded stranger, a piper, appears in the doorway, who demonstrates that with the sound of his playing he can entice rats to their deaths. The town leaders are delighted and offer him 1000 gold coins as payment if he would get rid of all of the town's rats. The piper accepts and begins walking through the city, drawing all of the rats behind him. At the same time, a jeweler, who was among the elite group of leaders, walks into a woman's home and tries to seduce her. The woman (who is the only character who does not look grotesque, implying innocence) refuses. The jeweler persists, but before he can do anything the piper passes by her house, and at the sound of the music the jeweler is forced to jump out of the window. After all of the rats plunge off a cliff-side tower into a lake, the piper comes back into town, on the way once again preventing the jeweler's advances on the woman. The piper and the woman sit on a bench together as he plays a beautiful melody that is accompanied by paint-on-wood animation (a complete change of style from the rest of the film).

Finally, the piper goes to collect his promised payment. The town leaders—who are in the middle of gorging themselves on food and wine and among whom is the jeweler seen drinking and telling his sad tale of rejection to his friends—give him only a black button. The piper leaves angrily. That night, the jeweler and his drunken friends break into the woman's house as she is praying, and proceed to rape and murder her (both acts are not shown; the act of rape is implied). The piper comes, but this time, he is too late; all that he can do is close the eyes of her horrified face.

Now the piper climbs up the highest tower in the town, to the top floor where the machinery for the sun that we saw in the introduction is located. At the very top is the god Saturn, holding an hourglass. The piper and Saturn have a silent conversation, and a decision is made. All of the sand in Saturn's hourglass runs out, and the gears that make the sun rise stop working. As the now silent day begins, the piper begins to play his pipe and leaves the tower. As he walks through the streets and the citizens hear him, they turn into rats and follow the sound, eventually jumping off the tower just as the rats did previously, the transformed jeweler being the last to jump.

The only person left is an old fisherman (who earlier in the film had been seen watching the city from far off) who comes to watch. When he gets close to the piper, however, the piper ceases to exist; his cloak, now empty of a physical being inside it, is blown away with the wind. The fisherman walks through the abandoned city and finds in one of the houses the only survivor remaining: a baby (who is still uncorrupted). He takes the baby away with him and leaves the now empty town.

== Voices ==
- Oldřich Kaiser
- Jiří Lábus
- Michal Pavlíček
- Vilém Čok

== Production ==
The Pied Piper was an unusually ambitious project for the production company Kratky Film, which like other animation studios in Czechoslovakia primarily made television short films for children. Research for the film took six months. Director Jiří Barta's aim was to make an adaptation of the Pied Piper of Hamelin which captured the German spirit, and which had to be suitable for animation. The film's narrative therefore took traits from several alterations of the myth, but mainly stayed true to the version presented in the novel Krysař by Viktor Dyk. Writing the screenplay and doing technical preparations took one year.

The art design was based on German Expressionism and medieval German art conventions. Barta said: "This element has actually solved certain spatial problems in that part of the mediaeval canon is that the important figures are big, and secondary figures are small. So it has solved the whole problem of space, and justifies an illogicality – a lack of logic – about the world of the film." Barta designed the puppets and sets himself. He started with drawings and then made models to provide three dimensions. The puppets were intentionally designed as to appear mechanical, which would contrast with the use of living rats, to create the impression that the rats were more alive than the humans. The exceptions were the characters Agnes and the fisherman, who were given a softer design to represent a world of purity. The puppets varied in size between one and 60 centimeters. One scene in the film features two-dimensional animation in a style radically different from the rest. This segment was inspired by medieval painting on wood, and in particular the art of Jan van Eyck.

Filming took one year and after that the sound was added in post-production. The language spoken in the film is fictitious and not supposed to be literally understood by anybody. According to Barta, the language was "somewhat based on German, but the main emphasis was on the rhythm and the onomatopoeic quality of the language." Voice acting was provided by Oldřich Kaiser, Jiří Lábus, Michal Pavlíček and Vilém Čok.

== Release ==
The film was screened in the Un Certain Regard section of the 1986 Cannes Film Festival. Its Czechoslovak premiere was on 1 September the same year.

An NTSC R1 DVD of Jiří Barta's films called "Jiri Barta: Labyrinth of Darkness" was released by Kino Video on 12 September 2006. The DVD contains most of Barta's filmography (this film, A Ballad About Green Wood, The Club of the Laid Off, The Design, Disc Jockey, The Last Theft, Riddles for a Candy, The Vanished World of Gloves). The other films range from 6 to 24 minutes in length. The DVD features the original Czech soundtracks with English subtitles. Other DVDs featuring the film include a Japanese version of the above mentioned release, as well as a French release from Doriane Films which has only this. A Czech DVD was released on 26 August 2009 along with The Club of the Laid Off and The Last Theft.

A new restoration of the film was released on August 29, 2023 and distributed by Deaf Crocodile. This release also includes Barta’s The Vanished World Of Gloves as well as a documentary about The Pied Piper. This marks the first time that The Pied Piper was officially released on Blu-Ray.

== Reception ==
=== Critical reception ===
Critical reception for the film has been very positive.

Jamie S. Rich from DVD Talk gave the film a positive review stating, "I wholeheartedly enjoyed the skewed vision of Jiri Barta, even if the DVD production did not match the level of his craft. One can only hope that someday there will be a much better version of Jiri Barta: Labyrinth of Darkness that will restore his gorgeous animation to its full glory, so that we can see treasures like The Pied Piper of Hamelin and The Vanished World of Gloves as they were intended. In the meantime, you shouldn't go without looking in on a world unmatched in its creativity".

Time Out Magazine praised the film calling it, "An impressive film, notable not only for its richly imaginative juxtapositions of visual textures, but for its resolutely grotesque account of a society's lemming-like race towards self-annihilation".

Jens Adrian from German film review website Treffpunkt: Kritik.de praised the film stating: "The handmade animation, together with the gloomy appearance of the characters and the diverse techniques that the filmmakers incorporated into the creation, make Krysar a visually fascinating film." Keith Allen from MovieRapture.com gave the film a positive review stating, "Instead of attempting to fool us into becoming involved with persons portrayed as though they were individuals such as ourselves, Barta creates a land that exists independently of our own universe, one that so envelopes the viewer that he can forget about his own existence and submerge himself in his experience of watching the film. The director has truly created a powerful, evocative masterpiece".

=== Awards ===
It won the 1986 "Golden Mikeldi" Award at the Bilbao International Festival of Documentary and Short Films.

== See also ==
- List of animated feature-length films
- List of stop-motion films
