= List of films based on Germanic mythology =

This is a list of films based on Germanic mythology.

== Beowulf ==
Title	Release date	Notes
Grendel Grendel Grendel	1981	
Animated Epics: Beowulf	1998	
Beowulf	1999	a science-fiction/fantasy film starring Christopher Lambert.
The 13th Warrior	1999	action movie directed by John McTiernan mixing Beowulf with the travels of Ibn Fadlan.
Beowulf & Grendel	2005	starring Gerard Butler and directed by the Icelandic-Canadian Sturla Gunnarsson.
Grendel	2007	a made-for television movie on the Sci Fi Channel (United States).
Beowulf	2007	a DVD release of a performance of Beowulf by Benjamin Bagby in the original Old English
Beowulf	2007	an animated film directed by Robert Zemeckis and created through motion capture, a technique similar to that used by Zemeckis in The Polar Express. The manuscript was written by Roger Avary and Neil Gaiman. It deviates significantly from the original poem, most notably by making the dragon fought in the finale the offspring of Beowulf and Grendel's mother, whom he did not slay.
Beowulf: Prince of the Geats	2007	
Outlander	2008	a science fiction film starring James Caviezel.

== Gesta Danorum ==
Title	Release date	Notes
Hagbard and Signe	1967	
Prince of Jutland	1994	
The Northman	2022	

== Household and nature spirits ==
Title	Release date	Notes
Meister Eder und sein Pumuckl	1982–1989	
Tomte Tummetott and the Fox	2007	
The Spiderwick Chronicles	2008	
Thale	2012	
The Tomten and the Fox	2019	

== Kraken ==
Title	Release date	Notes
Clash of the Titans	1981	
Atlantis: Milo's Return	2003	
Kraken: Tentacles of the Deep	2006	
Pirates of the Caribbean: Dead Man's Chest	2006	
Clash of the Titans	2010	
Hotel Transylvania 3: Summer Vacation	2018	

== Mother Hulda ==
Title	Release date	Notes
Mother Holly	1906	Germany
Frau Holle	1953	East Germany
Mother Holly	1954	West Germany
Mother Holly	1961	West Germany
Mother Holly	1963	East Germany
Once Upon a Time	1973	West Germany
The Feather Fairy	1985	Czechoslovakia
Frau Holle	2008	Germany

== Norse pantheon ==
Title	Release date	Notes
En vikingafilm : Filmspex i 5 avdelningar	1922	
The Virgin Spring	1960	
Odin: Photon Sailer Starlight	1985	
Valhalla	1986	
Erik the Viking	1989	
The Runestone	1991	
Berserker	2004	
Son of the Mask	2005	
Hammer of the Gods	2009	
Almighty Thor	2011	
Legends of Valhalla: Thor	2011	
Vicky and the Treasure of the Gods	2011	
Vikingdom	2013	
Gåten Ragnarok	2013	
Kung Fury	2015	
Valhalla	2019	

=== Marvel's Thor ===
Title	Release date	Notes
The Marvel Super Heroes	1966	
Hulk Vs. Thor	2009	
Thor	2011	
Thor: Tales of Asgard	2011	
Thor: The Dark World	2013	
Team Thor	2016	
Team Thor: Part 2	2017	
Thor: Ragnarok	2017	
Thor: Love and Thunder	2022	

== Ragnar Lodbrok ==
Title	Release date	Notes
The Vikings	1958	

== Trolls and jötnar ==
Title	Release date	Notes
Sotlugg och Linlugg	1948	
The Last Farm in the Valley	1950	
Karius and Bactus	1954	
The Ashlad and the Hungry Troll	1967	
The Trolls and the Christmas Express	1981	
The Boy Who Loved Trolls	1984	
Troll	1986	
The Little Troll Prince	1987	
Ernest Scared Stupid	1991	
Rolli: Amazing Tales	1991	
Det var en gang	1994	
A Troll in Central Park	1994	
Rollo and the Spirit of the Woods	2001	
Quest for a Heart	2007	
Gnomes and Trolls: The Secret Chamber	2008	
Trollhunter	2010	
Frozen	2013	
Rölli ja kultainen avain	2013	
The Boxtrolls	2014	
Rölli ja kaikkien aikojen salaisuus	2016	
Trolls	2016	
The Ash Lad: In the Hall of the Mountain King	2017	
The Ritual	2017	
Border	2018	
Askeladden - I Soria Moria slott	2019	

== Völsung and Nibelung tradition (Nibelungenlied) ==
Title	Release date	Notes
I Nibelunghi	1910	
Siegfried	1912	
Die Nibelungen	1924	
The Dragon's Blood	1957	
Treasure of the Petrified Forest	1965	
Die Nibelungen	1966/1967	
The Long Swift Sword of Siegfried / The Erotic Adventures of Siegfried	1970	
Sigurd Fafnersbane	1981	
Dark Kingdom: The Dragon King	2004	
Siegfried (2005 film)	2005	
The Charlemagne Code	2008	

== See also ==
- Category:Television series based on Norse mythology
- List of films based on Greco-Roman mythology
- List of films based on Slavic mythology
- Norse mythology in popular culture
