= List of films based on classical mythology =

This is a list of films based on classical mythology (Greek and Roman mythology).

== Amazons ==
Title	Release date	Notes
The Warrior's Husband	1933	Parody
La Regina delle Amazzoni	1960	a.k.a. Colossus and the Amazon Queen
Le Gladiatrici	1963	
The Rape of the Belt	1964	Australian TV film
Le Amazzoni - donne d'amore e di guerra	1973	
The Amazons	1973	
Dschungelmädchen für zwei Halunken	1974	
Wonder Woman	1974	TV film
The New Original Wonder Woman	1975	TV film serving as Pilot episode
Gold of the Amazon Women	1979	TV film
Hercules and the Amazon Women	1994	TV film
Wonder Woman	2008	Animated DTV film based
Wonder Woman	2017	
Wonder Woman 1984	2020	

== Atlantis ==
Title	Release date	Notes
Atlantis: The Lost Continent	1961	
Atlantis: End of a World, Birth of a Legend	2011	
Atlantis	2013–2015	TV series

== Centaurs ==
Title	Release date	Notes
Fantasia	1940	The Pastoral Symphony segment by Ludwig van Beethoven of the film features centaurs courting Centaurides/"centaurettes".

== Hercules / Heracles ==
=== Italian film series ===
The Sword-and-sandal series (1957-1965) includes numerous films depicting Hercules that go by various titles depending by country of release. Below is a list (chronological order) that begins with the film's U.S.-release title, followed by the original Italian title and translation: (Note: A number of English-dubbed Italian films that featured the Hercules name in their title were never intended to be Hercules movies by their Italian creators: Hercules, Prisoner of Evil was actually a retitled Ursus film; Hercules and the Black Pirate and Hercules and the Treasure of the Incas were both retitled Samson movies; Hercules and the Masked Rider was actually a retitled Goliath movie; and the films Hercules Against the Moon Men, Hercules Against the Barbarians, Hercules Against the Mongols, and Hercules of the Desert were all originally Maciste films. Likewise, most of the Sons of Hercules movies shown on American TV in the 1960s had nothing to do with Hercules in their original Italian incarnations.)

Title	Release date	Notes
Hercules	1958	Italian: Le Fatiche di Ercole, lit. 'The Labors of Hercules', starring Steve Reeves.
Hercules Unchained	1959	Italian: Ercole e la regina di Lidia, lit. 'Hercules and the Queen of Lydia' starring Steve Reeves.
Goliath and the Dragon	1960	Italian: La Vendetta di Ercole, lit. 'The Revenge of Hercules'
Hercules vs The Hydra	1960	Italian: Gli Amori di Ercole, lit. 'The Loves of Hercules'
Hercules and the Captive Women	1961	Italian: Ercole alla conquista di Atlantide, lit. 'Hercules at the Conquest of Atlantis'; UK: Hercules Conquers Atlantis
Hercules in the Haunted World	1961	Italian: Ercole al centro della terra, lit. 'Hercules at the Center of the Earth'
Hercules in the Valley of Woe	1961	Italian: Maciste contro Ercole nella valle dei guai, lit. 'Maciste vs. Hercules in the Vale of Woe'
Ulysses Against the Son of Hercules	1962	Italian: Ulisse contro Ercole, lit. 'Ulysses vs. Hercules'
The Fury of Hercules	1962	Italian: La Furia di Ercole
Hercules, Samson and Ulysses	1963	Italian: Ercole sfida Sansone, lit. 'Hercules Challenges Samson'
Hercules Vs. the Moloch	1963	Italian: Ercole contro Molock; a.k.a. Conquest of Mycene, starring Gordon Scott
Son of Hercules in the Land of Darkness	1964	Italian: Ercole l'invincibile, lit. 'Hercules, the Invincible' starring Dan Vadis
Hercules vs. The Giant Warrior	1964	Italian: il Trionfo di Ercole, lit. 'The Triumph of Hercules'; a.k.a. Hercules and the Ten Avengers starring Dan Vadis
Hercules Against Rome	1964	Italian: Ercole contro Roma
Hercules Against the Sons of the Sun	1964	Italian: Ercole contro i figli del sole
Hercules and the Tyrants of Babylon	1964	Italian: Ercole contro i tiranni di Babilonia
Samson and His Mighty Challenge	1964	Italian: Ercole, Sansone, Maciste e Ursus, gli invincibili, lit. 'Hercules, Samson, Maciste, and Ursus: the Invincibles'
Hercules and the Princess of Troy	1965	a.k.a. "Hercules vs. the Sea Monster" starring Gordon Scott
Hercules, the Avenger	1965	Italian: Sfida dei giganti, lit. 'Challenge of the Giants'

=== Other Hercules-related films ===
Title	Release date	Notes
The Three Stooges Meet Hercules	1962	
Hercules	1964	Indian Hindi-language adventure film by Shriram in the style of the Italian peplums, starring Dara Singh in the titular role of the hero.
Son of Hercules	1964	another Indian film in Hindi by Sultan. It follows the story of Hercules' son and his fight with a dragon.
Tarzan Aur Hercules	1964	Indian Hindi-language action film by Mahmood, featuring a character based on Hercules who helps Tarzan win a princess.
Sheba and Hercules	1967	Indian Hindi-language action film by B. S. Chowdhary. It features characters with allusions to Hercules and the Queen of Sheba.
The Return from Olympus	1969	Russian: Возвращение с Олимпа [USSR], animated film by Alexandra Snezhko-Blotskaya
Hercules in New York	1969	starring Arnold Schwarzenegger
Hercules	1983	starring Lou Ferrigno
Hercules 2	1985	Italian: Le Avventure dell'incredibile Ercole starring Lou Ferrigno
Heracles and Admetus	1986	[USSR] animated film by Anatoly Petrov
Hercules and the Amazon Women	1994	
Hercules and the Circle of Fire	1994	
Hercules and the Lost Kingdom	1994	
Hercules in the Underworld	1994	
Hercules in the Maze of the Minotaur	1994	
Hercules	1997	animated Disney film
Young Hercules	1998	direct-to-video
Hercules and Xena - The Animated Movie: The Battle for Mount Olympus	1998	direct-to-video
The Legend of Hercules	2014	
Hercules	2014	

=== TV series ===
Title	Release date	Notes
Hercules: The Legendary Journeys	1995–99	
Xena: Warrior Princess	1995–2001	spinoff of Legendary Journeys
Young Hercules	1998–99	
Himcules	1998–99	animated
Hercules	2005	miniseries

==== Sons of Hercules ====
Sons of Hercules was a syndicated television show that aired in the US in the 1960s. The series repackaged 14 Italian sword-and-sandal films by giving them a memorable theme song and a standard intro relating the lead character in each film to the Greek demigod Hercules any way they could. The first title listed for each film was its American television title, followed by the original Italian title in parentheses:

Title	Notes
Mole Men versus the Son of Hercules	(Maciste, The Strongest Man in the World) starring Mark Forest as Maciste
The Terror of Rome versus the Son of Hercules	(Maciste, Gladiator of Sparta) starring Mark Forest
Fire Monsters Against The Son Of Hercules	(Maciste Vs. The Monsters) starring Reg Lewis as Maciste
Triumph Of The Son Of Hercules	(The Triumph Of Maciste) starring Kirk Morris as Maciste
Son Of Hercules In The Land Of Darkness	(Hercules The Invincible) starring Dan Vadis as Hercules
Ulysses Vs. The Son Of Hercules	(Ulysses Against Hercules) starring Mike Lane as Hercules
Son Of Hercules In The Land Of Fire	(Ursus In The Land Of Fire) starring Ed Fury as Ursus
Ursus, Son Of Hercules	(a.k.a. Ursus, a.k.a. Mighty Ursus) starring Ed Fury
The Tyrant Of Lydia Vs. The Son Of Hercules	(Goliath and the Rebel Slave) starring Gordon Scott as Goliath
Messalina Against the Son Of Hercules	(The Last Gladiator) starring Richard Harrison as Glaucus
Devil Of The Desert Vs. The Son Of Hercules	(Anthar The Invincible) starring Kirk Morris as Anthar
Medusa Vs. The Son Of Hercules	(Perseus The Invincible) starring Richard Harrison as Perseus
Beast Of Babylon Versus The Son Of Hercules	(Hero Of Babylon) starring Gordon Scott as Prince Nippur
Venus Against The Son Of Hercules	(Mars, God Of War) starring Roger Browne as Mars

== Homer and Troy ==
Title	Release date	Notes
Helena	1924	A silent epic that covers the Trojan War, from its beginning to its end.
Helen of Troy	1956	Set in western Anatolia during the Trojan War, largely based on the epic poems Iliad and Odyssey by Homer.
The Trojan Horse	1961	Italian: La Guerra di Troia
Electra	1962	[Greece]
L'ira di Achille	1962	[Italy] Italian peplum adaptation of The Iliad.
The Trojan Women	1971	[UK, USA, Greece]
Iphigenia	1977	[Greece] - Set in the port town of Aulis, Greece immediately before the Greek expeditionary force set sails to attack Troy. Due to unfavorable weather conditions, king Agamemnon of Mycenae offers his daughter Iphigenia as a human sacrifice to the goddess Artemis. The film is based on the theatrical play Iphigenia in Aulis by Euripides.
Les Troyens	1984	[US] - TV movie
Helen of Troy	2003	TV miniseries set in western Anatolia during the Trojan War, loosely based on the epic poem Iliad by Homer.
Troy	2004	
Percy Jackson & the Olympians: The Lightning Thief	2010	
Percy Jackson: Sea of Monsters	2013	

=== Aeneas ===
Title	Release date	Notes
The Avenger	1962	Italian: La Leggenda di Enea, lit. 'The Legend of Aeneas'
Eneide	1971	[Yugoslavia/Italy] - TV miniseries
Dido & Aeneas	1995	[UK] - TV movie
Dido and Aeneas	1995	[Canada] - filmed production of the opera

=== Odysseus/Ulysses ===
Title	Release date	Notes
The Island of Calypso: Ulysses and the Giant Polyphemus	1905	French: L'Île de Calypso: Ulysse et le géant Polyphème
Odissea	1911	
Ulysses	1955	
L'Odissea	1968	Italy - TV mini-series
The Return of Ulysses to His Homeland	1973	[UK] - TV movie
Uliisses	1982	Germany
Il ritorno d'Ulisse in patria	1985	[Austria] - filmed production of the original opera
Nostos: The Return	1989	[Italy]
The Odyssey	1997	TV miniseries
The Animated Odyssey	2000	[US] - animated TV movie
O Brother, Where Art Thou?	2000	based on the Odyssey
L'Odyssée	2003	[Canada] - TV movie
The Return	2024	
The Odyssey	2026	

== Jason and the Argonauts ==
Title	Release date	Notes
Hercules	1958	Italian: Le Fatiche di Ercole, lit. 'The Labors of Hercules' starring Steve Reeves
Jason and the Argonauts	1963	US film - The story of Jason and Argonauts, a band of heroes in Greek mythology, who in the years before the Trojan War (around 1300 BC) accompanied Jason to Colchis in his quest to find the Golden Fleece.
Argonauts	1971	Russian: Аргонавты USSR - animated film
Argonavtebi, or, a Merry Chronicle of a Dangerous Journey	1986	USSR - TV movie
Jason and the Argonauts	2000	US - TV miniseries
The Spirit	2008	US - features the Golden Fleece and the blood of Heracles.

== Oedipus ==
Title	Release date	Notes
The Man Who Smiles	1937	
Oedipus Rex	1957	
Antigone	1961	
Oedipus Rex	1967	
Oedipus the King	1968	
Funeral Parade of Roses	1969	
Night Warning	1982	
Oedipus Wrecks	1989	
Edipo Alcalde	1996	
Oldboy	2003	
Oldboy	2013	Remake of the 2003 Oldboy
Music	2023	

== Orpheus ==
Title	Release date	Notes
Orphée	1950	France
Black Orpheus	1959	Portuguese: Orfeu Negro) [Brazil]
Evrydiki BA 2O37	1975	[Greece]
Metamorphoses / Winds of Change (1978-79 Sanrio film)	1978	[USA]
Orfeu	1999	[Brazil]
Moulin Rouge!	2001	Set in 1899
Orpheus	2005	
The Book of Life	2014	
O'Dessa	2025	

== Perseus ==
Title	Release date	Notes
Perseo l'invincibile	1963	a.k.a. Medusa vs The Son of Hercules
Perseus	1973	[USSR]
Metamorphoses / Winds of Change (1978-79 Sanrio film)	1978	
Clash of the Titans	1981	
Percy Jackson & the Olympians: The Lightning Thief	2010	
Clash of the Titans	2010	
Wrath of the Titans	2012	
Percy Jackson: Sea of Monsters	2013	

== Pygmalion ==
Title	Release date	Notes
Pygmalion	1937	
My Fair Lady	1964	
Weird Science	1985	
Mannequin	1987	
Mighty Aphrodite	1995	

== Roman Kingdom and Romulus & Remus ==
Title	Release date	Notes
Romolo e Remo	1961	starring Steve Reeves and Gordon Scott as the two brothers.
Duel of Champions	1961	about the Roman legend of the Horatii
Romulus and the Sabines	1961	starring Roger Moore as Romulus.
The Rape of the Sabine Women	1962	starring Wolf Ruvinskis as Romulus.
Romulus & Remus: The First King	2019	starring Alessandro Borghi and Alessio Lapice.

== Sirens and harpies ==
Title	Release date	Notes
Harpya	1979	Belgian short film
My Little Pony: Equestria Girls – Rainbow Rocks	2014	featuring the sirens of Greco-Roman mythology in a modern setting.

== Theseus and the Minotaur of Crete ==
Title	Release date	Notes
Minotaur, the Wild Beast of Crete	1960	Italian film starring Bob Mathias, loosely based on the mythological story
Labyrinth	1971	Russian: Лабиринт Soviet animated film by Alexandra Snezhko-Blotskaya
Minotaur	2006	
Immortals	2011	Loosely based on the Greek myth of Theseus and the Minotaur and the Titanomachy.

== The Titans and Prometheus ==
Title	Release date	Notes
Arrivano i titani	1962	Italian comedy including the mythological characters Cadmus and the Titans, starring Giuliano Gemma and Pedro Armendáriz.
Prometheus	1974	Soviet animated film by Alexandra Snezhko-Blotskaya
The Lighthouse	2019	takes on themes from the story of Prometheus

== Twelve Olympians / Dii Consentes ==
Title	Release date	Notes
Artémis, cœur d'artichaut	2013	[France]
Uchu Sentai Kyuranger the Movie: Gase Indaver Strikes Back	2017	[Japan]
Uchu Sentai Kyuranger vs. Space Squad	2018	[Japan]
Lupinranger VS Patranger VS Kyuranger	2019	[Japan]

== Ursus ==
Ursus is a super-human pseudo-Biblical/Roman character who is the hero in a series of Italian films made in the 1960s. There were a total of 9 Italian sword-and-sandal films that featured Ursus as the main character, as follows:

Title	Release date	Notes
Ursus	1961	a.k.a. Mighty Ursus and Ursus, Son of Hercules starring Ed Fury
La Vendetta di Ursus	1961	The Revenge of Ursus starring Samson Burke
Ursus e la Ragazza Tartara	1961	Ursus and the Tartar Princess; a.k.a. Ursus and the Tartar Girl and The Tartar Invasion starring Joe Robinson
Ursus Nella Valle dei Leoni	1962	Ursus in the Valley of the Lions; a.k.a. Valley of the Lions starring Ed Fury
Ursus Nella Terra di Fuoco	1963	Ursus in the Land of Fire; a.k.a. Son of Hercules in the Land of Fire starring Ed Fury
Ursus il Gladiatore Rebelle	1963	Ursus, the Rebel Gladiator starring Dan Vadis
Ursus, il terrore dei Kirghisi	1964	Ursus, the Terror of the Kirghiz; a.k.a. Hercules, Prisoner of Evil starring Reg Park
Ercole, Sansone, Maciste e Ursus, gli invincibili	1964	Hercules, Samson, Maciste and Ursus: The Invincibles; a.k.a. Samson and the Mighty Challenge and Combate dei gigantes starring Yan Larvor as Ursus
Gli Invincibili Tre	1964	The Invincible Three, a.k.a. The Three Avengers Ursus is the lead hero, played by Alan Steel

== See also ==
- Category:Television series based on classical mythology
- Swords-and-sandals
- Lists of movie source material
- List of films based on Greek drama
- List of films based on Germanic mythology
- List of films based on Slavic mythology
- List of films set in ancient Greece
- List of films set in ancient Rome
- List of films set in ancient Egypt
