= List of films based on Slavic mythology =

This is a list of films based on Slavic mythology.

| Title | Release date | Notes |
|---|---|---|
| The Humpbacked Horse | 1947 | USSR - animation |
| The Magic Sword | 1950 | Yugoslavia |
| Sadko | 1953 | USSR |
| Old Czech Legends | 1953 | Czechoslovakia - animation |
| Ilya Muromets | 1956 | USSR |
| Jack Frost | 1964 | USSR |
| The Tale of Tsar Saltan | 1966 | USSR |
| Viy | 1967 | USSR |
| Lokis | 1970 | Poland |
| Ruslan and Ludmila | 1972 | USSR |
| Leptirica | 1973 | Yugoslavia |
| A Ballad About Green Wood | 1983 | Czechoslovakia - animation |
| The Tale of Tsar Saltan | 1984 | USSR |
| Little Otik | 2000 | Czech Republic |
| The Hexer | 2001 | Poland |
| An Ancient Tale: When the Sun Was a God | 2003 | Poland |
| Dobrynya Nikitich and Zmey Gorynych | 2006 | Russia - animation |
| Prince Vladimir | 2006 | Russia - animation |
| Wolfhound | 2006 | Russia |

== See also ==
- List of films based on Germanic mythology
- List of films based on Greco-Roman mythology
