= Jiří Barta =

Czech animator and director

- Born: 26 November 1948 (age 77); Prague, Czechoslovakia
- Occupations: Film director, screenwriter

Jiří Barta (born 26 November 1948) is a Czech stop-motion animation director. Many of his films use wood as a medium for animation. Among his notable films are the 1986 film The Pied Piper.

In 2007 he released his first computer animated short film called Domečku, vař produced in a studio called Alkay Animation. In 2009 he released a puppet-animated feature film, Toys in the Attic.

== Biography ==
Jiří Barta was born in Prague. In 1969 he began studying film and TV graphics at the Academy of Arts, Architecture and Design in Prague. He made the first animated film in 1978 with Jiří Trnka's studio.

At the Academy of Arts, Architecture and Design in Prague he leads the Film and TV Graphics Studio. He was appointed as associate professor in 1993 and Professor in 2001. In addition to teaching, he collaborates with theater and film projects.

== Filmography ==
Feature films

- The Pied Piper (Krysař, 1986)
- Toys in the Attic (Na půdě aneb Kdo má dneska narozeniny?, 2009)
- The Golem (TBA)

Short films

- Riddles for a Candy (Hádanky za bonbón, 1978)
- The Design (Projekt, 1981)
- Disc Jockey (Diskžokej, 1981)
- The Vanished World of Gloves (Zaniklý svět rukavic, 1982)
- A Ballad About Green Wood (Balada o zeleném dřevu, 1983)
- The Last Theft (Poslední lup, 1987)
- The Club of the Laid Off (Klub odložených, 1989)
- Golem (1993)
- Cook, Mug, Cook! (Domečku, vař!, 2007)
- Yuki Onna (2013)
