= Two Nights with Cleopatra =

1954 film

- Film poster
- Directed by: Mario Mattoli
- Written by: Ruggero Maccari; Ettore Scola
- Produced by: Giuseppe Colizzi
- Starring: Sophia Loren; Alberto Sordi
- Cinematography: Riccardo Pallottini
- Edited by: Renato Cinquini
- Music by: Armando Trovajoli
- Release date: 1954
- Running time: 78 minutes
- Country: Italy
- Language: Italian

Two Nights with Cleopatra (Italian: Due notti con Cleopatra) is a 1954 Italian historical comedy film directed by Mario Mattoli and starring Sophia Loren.

== Plot ==
Cesare, a Roman soldier, comes to Alexandria to serve in the army staff of the Egyptian queen Cleopatra. Cleopatra is a beautiful woman, able to charm anyone, and is the wife of Emperor Mark Antony, but when he is not in the city, she prefers to spend the night with one or another of his soldiers, whom she will then have killed the next day with poison.

When Mark Antony comes back to Alexandria to fight a war, Cleopatra visits him secretly while her place at the palace is taken by Nisca, a girl who is so like her she can pass as her double, except for being blonde. It turns out that on one of the evenings on which Cleopatra has been swapped for her double, Cesare fails to notice this. Unaware of the exchange, Cesare spends the night with the girl who proves to be very fragile and sad.

The next night Cesare is arrested for trying to hurt Cleopatra (the real one) but in reality the man just wanted to say hello. Intrigued by the fact that Cesare wears a ring identical to hers, Cleopatra makes him free and offers to spend the night with him, warning him that the next day he will die. Cesare, however, manages to get drunk and to free the "queen" Nisca, locked up in prison. The film ends with the two fleeing from Alexandria.

== Cast ==
- Sophia Loren as Cleopatra / Nisca
- Alberto Sordi as Cesarino
- Ettore Manni as Marcantonio
- Paul Muller as Tortul
- Rolf Tasna as Meros
- Nando Bruno as Legionary
- Alberto Talegalli as Enobarbo
- Gianni Cavalieri as Taverniere
- Carlo Dale as Cocis
- Riccardo Garrone as Venus
- Ughetto Bertucci as Merchant
- Giacomo Furia as Merchant
- Enzo Garinei as Merchant
- Andrea Bosic as Caio Malpurnio
