= Decline of an Empire =

2014 film by Michael Redwood

- Directed by: Michael Redwood
- Produced by: Michael Redwood
- Starring: Nicole Madjarov; Peter O'Toole; Steven Berkoff; Joss Ackland
- Cinematography: Ralph Messer; Peter Taylor
- Edited by: Helen Ellene Michael
- Music by: John Koutselinis
- Production company: Katherine of Alexandria Limited
- Distributed by: Kaleidoscope (United Kingdom); Lionsgate (United States)
- Release dates: 12 August 2014 (United States); 6 April 2015 (United Kingdom)
- Running time: 110 minutes
- Country: United Kingdom
- Language: English
- Budget: GBP12,000,000 (estimated)
- Box office: $87,873

Decline of an Empire is a 2014 British biographical historical drama film, produced and directed by Michael Redwood, about the life of Catherine of Alexandria. Also known as Fall of an Empire, it is one of the last film roles of Peter O'Toole, who died before the film was released, and the last film of Joss Ackland before he retired and his death in 2023. The film originally carried the working title Katherine of Alexandria.

== Cast ==
- Nicole Madjarov as Katherine of Alexandria
- Peter O'Toole as Cornelius Gallus
- Steven Berkoff as Liberius
- Joss Ackland as Rufus
- Jack Goddard as Constantine the Great
- Dudley Sutton as Marcellus
- Edward Fox as Constantius
- Samantha Beckinsale as Vita

== Release ==
The film was due for release in 2014. It was released direct-to-DVD in the United States on 12 August 2014 under the title Decline of an Empire and in Germany on the 18th August 2014 under the title Katharina von Alexandrien. The film was also released direct-to-DVD in the United Kingdom on 6 April 2015 as Fall of an Empire: The Story of Katherine of Alexandria. Red Rock Entertainment acted as executive producers. The latest version of the film is titled Katherine of Sinai and was released in 2018 on streaming (Amazon Prime).

== Reception ==
The Guardian awarded the film one out of five stars: "Fall of an Empire: The Story of Katherine of Alexandria review – a Roman epic on a British budget". Audience Review on Rotten Tomatoes is at 23% (No Reviewer's Reactions)
