= Alessandra Negrini =

Brazilian actress (born 1970)

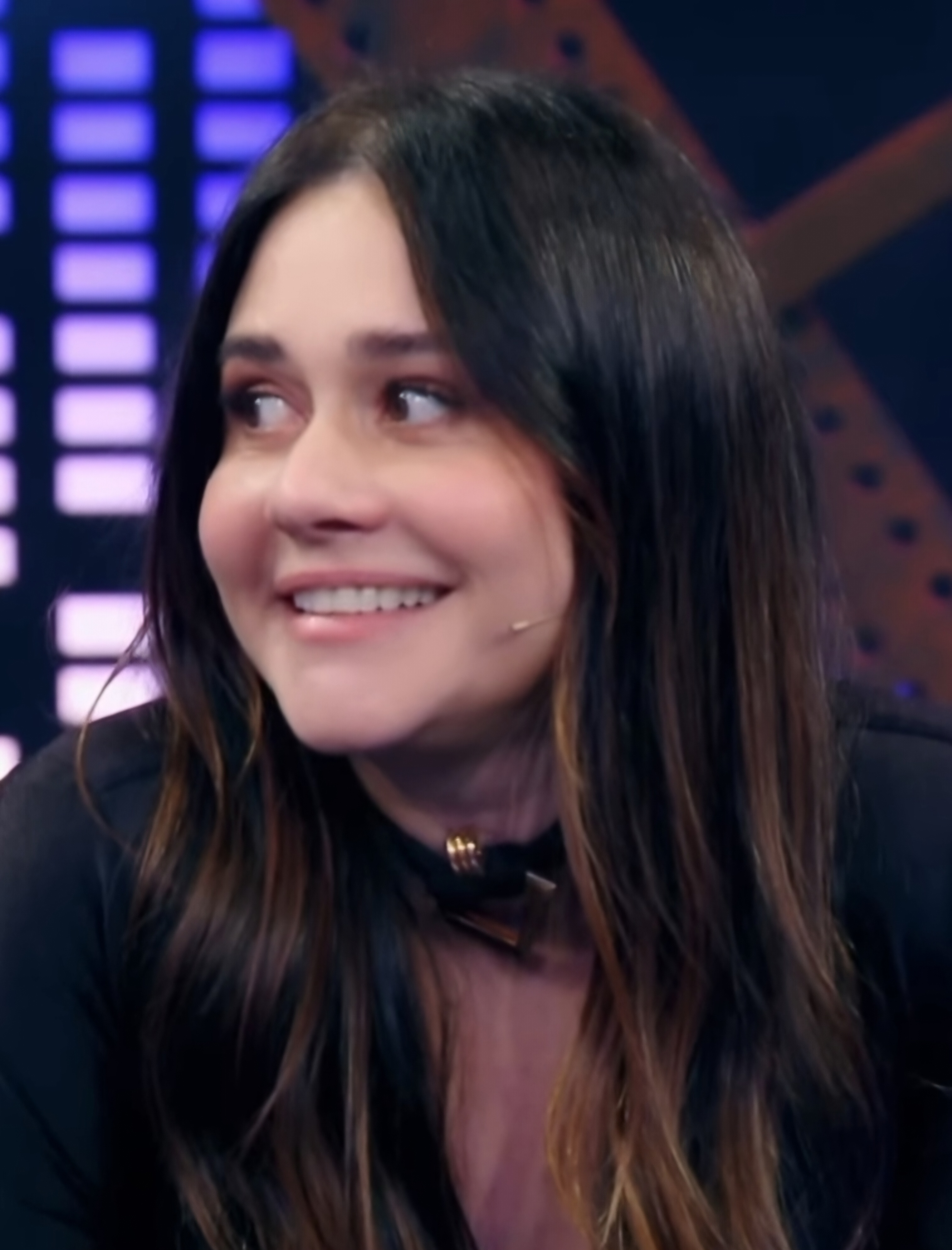
- Negrini in 2024
- Born: Alessandra Vidal de Negreiros Negrini; 29 August 1970 (age 56); São Paulo, Brazil
- Occupation: Actress
- Years active: 1993–present
- Partner(s): Murilo Benício (1995–1999); Marcos Palmeira (1999–2000); Otto (2001–2008); Sérgio Guizé (2010–2012)
- Children: 2

Alessandra Vidal de Negreiros Negrini (born 29 August 1970) is a Brazilian actress. She is known for her roles in Brazilian telenovelas and films. She began her television career after starring in Olho no Olho (1993) playing the role of Clara. In film, her first role was Lília in the Four Days in September. She went on to star in over a dozen telenovelas and television series. In telenovelas, she is known for her roles in Desejos de Mulher (2002), Paraíso Tropical (2007), Lado a Lado (2012), and Boogie Oogie (2014).

Her portrayal of twins in Paraíso Tropical earned her accolades such as a Minha Award, Festival and Brasília Award.

== Biography ==
Negrini is the daughter of engineer Luiz Eduardo Osório Negrini, and pedagogue Neusa Vidal de Negreiros, who is descended from André Vidal de Negreiros. Alessandra has Portuguese and Italian ancestry. She and her brother, Paulo Roberto, spent their childhood and adolescence in Santos. At 18 she enrolled in a theater course, and at that time, was called to do tests on Rede Globo.

== Career ==
Her TV debut was in the telenovela Olho no Olho, Antônio Calmon. In 1995, she starred in the miniseries starring Engraçadinha... Seus Amores e Seus Pecados, based on the work of Nelson Rodrigues.

In 2000, she began playing Isabel Olinto in the critically acclaimed miniseries A Muralha, a tribute to 500 years in Brazil. Because of the sensual appeal of her character in the miniseries, she was featured on the cover of the Brazilian edition of Playboy magazine in April of that year. On 3 February 2000, Negrini was arrested for taking her three-year-old son Antônio to a Leblon showing of Sleepy Hollow which was rated 18+ by the Brazilian advisory rating system.

In 2002, Negrini received accolades for voicing the villain Selma in a recording of the novel Desejos de Mulher by Euclydes Marinho. In 2003, he participated in the children's series Sítio do Picapau Amarelo, playing Rapunzel. In 2004, she made an appearance on the soap opera Celebridade, Gilberto Braga. In the theater, she attended parts of Os Credores and A Gaivota, in which she traveled to Europe, Canada and Japan.

In 2006, she participated, as the socialite, Yedda Schidmt, from the miniseries JK, which tells the story of Juscelino Kubitschek.

In 2007, she starred in the soap opera Paraíso Tropical. In the plot, the actress played the twin sisters Paula and Taís. The same year she premiered the film Cleópatra, Júlio Bressane, for which she won the best actress award at the Festival de Brasília. In 2008, she appeared in two more films: A Erva do Rato, of Júlio Bressane and No Retrovisor of Mauro Mendonça Filho.

Negrini returned to television in 2010 to participate in the series S.O.S. Emergência and As Cariocas.

In 2011, Negrini returned to the stage alongside Karin Rodrigues, to stage the play A Senhora de Dubuque, a text by Edward Albee. And was in the movie O Abismo Prateado and TokyoShow.

In 2012, she participated in the new version of the play A Propósito de Senhorita Júlia. The story takes place in Brazil at the beginning of the 21st century. In the same year, she starred in Lado a Lado, playing opera singer Catarina Ribeiro.

In 2014, Alessandra played Susana in Boogie Oogie, the novel by Rui Vilhena, replacing Meu Pedacinho de Chão. From October to December 2017, it is in poster with the piece the A Volta ao Lar, directed by Regina Duarte.

In 2018 returns the television interpreting the villain Susana in the novel Orgulho e Paixão. The character works for Julieta (Gabriela Duarte), a woman who has grown rich with coffee, and will do anything to become as powerful as her.

== Personal life ==
Negrini was married to actor Murilo Benício from 1998 to 1999. They have one son, actor Antônio Benício.

She was also married to singer Otto from 2001 to 2008, with whom she has one daughter, Betina (born 2003).

== Filmography ==
=== Television ===
Year	Title	Role	Notes
1993	Retrato de Mulher	Bruna	Participation
1993	Olho no Olho	Clara	
1994	Você Decide		Episode: "Anjo Vingador"
1995	Engraçadinha... Seus Amores e Seus Pecados	Engraçadinha (young)	Phase 1
1995	Cara & Coroa	Natália Santoro	
1996	A Comédia da Vida Privada		Episode: "O Grande Amor da Minha Vida'"
1997	Anjo Mau	Paula Novaes	
1998	Meu Bem Querer	Rebeca Maciel	
2000	A Muralha	Isabel Olinto	
2000	Brava Gente	Natália	Episode: "Armas e Corações"
2001	Os Normais	Sílvia	Episode: "Estresse é Normal"
2002	Desejos de Mulher	Selma Dumont	
2003	Sítio do Picapau Amarelo	Rapunzel	Season 3
2004	Celebridade	Marília Prudente da Costa	Episode dated 8 April 2004
2006	JK	Yedda Ovalle Schidmt	
2007	Paraíso Tropical	Paula Viana and Taís Grimaldi	
2008	Casseta & Planeta, Urgente!	Various characters	Episode: "August 26, 2008"
2009	A Turma do Didi	Herself	Episode: "July 26, 2009"
2010	S.O.S. Emergência	Sílvia	Episode: "Pegar ou Largar"
2010	As Cariocas	Marta	Episode: "A Iludida de Copacabana"
2010	Tal Filho, Tal Pai	Barbara Leão	Special End of Year
2012	Lado a Lado	Catarina Ribeiro	
2014	Boogie Oogie	Susana Bueno	
2016	Lúcia McCartney	Júlia	
2017	Angeli The Killer	Mara Tara	Dubbing
2018	Orgulho e Paixão	Susana Adonato	
2021	Invisible City	Inês	Main cast
2022	Travessia	Guida Sampaio	

=== Film ===
Year	Title	Role	Notes
1997	Four Days in September	Lília	
2001	Um Crime Nobre	Mônica Andrade	
2004	Sexo, Amor e Traição	Andréa	
2007	Cleópatra	Cleopatra	
2008	Os Desafinados	Luíza	
2008	No Retrovisor		
2008	A Erva do Rato	She	
2011	TokyoShow	Barbra Scott	Short film
2011	O Abismo Prateado	Violeta	
2012	2 Coelhos	Júlia	
2012	O Gorila	Rosalinda	
2013	DreamWaves – Antena dos Sonhos	She	
2016	Beduino	Woman	
2017	Eu Fico Loko	Lilian Figueiredo	
2018	Mulheres Alteradas	Marinati	

== Theater ==
Year	Title	Role
2001	O Beijo no Asfalto	Selminha
2003	Credores	Tekla
2008	A Gaivota	A Gaivota
2011	A Senhora de Dubuque	Jo
2012	A Propósito de Senhorita Júlia	Júlia
2016	Sonata Fantasma Bandeirante	Woman
2017	A Volta Ao Lar	Ruth

== Awards and nominations ==
Year	Category	Awards	Nominated work	Result	Ref.
1995	Best Female Revelation	APCA Awards	Engraçadinha... Seus Amores e Seus Pecados	Nominated	
1995	Best Female Revelation	Troféu Imprensa Awards	Engraçadinha... Seus Amores e Seus Pecados	Nominated	
2002	Best Actress	Contigo! Awards	Desejos de Mulher	Nominated	
2002	Best Villain	Contigo! Awards	Desejos de Mulher	Won	
2006	Best Romantic Actress	Contigo! Awards	JK	Nominated	
2007	Best Actress	APCA Awards	Paraíso Tropical	Nominated	
2007	Best Actress	Troféu Imprensa	Paraíso Tropical	Nominated	
2007	Best Actress	Contigo! Awards	Paraíso Tropical	Nominated	
2007	Best Romantic couple with Fábio Assunção	Contigo! Awards	Paraíso Tropical	Nominated	
2007	Best Actress	Arte Qualidade Awards	Paraíso Tropical	Nominated	
2007	Best Actress	Melhores do Ano Awards	Paraíso Tropical	Nominated	
2007	Best Actress	Extra de Televisão Awards	Paraíso Tropical	Nominated	
2007	Best Actress (voted by fans)	Minha Awards	Paraíso Tropical	Won	
2007	Best Actress (voted by Jury)	Minha Awards	Paraíso Tropical	Won	
2007	The Sexiest	Minha Awards	Paraíso Tropical	Won	
2007	Best Actress	Quem Awards	Paraíso Tropical	Nominated	
2007	Best Actress	Festival de Brasília Awards	Cléopatra	Won	
2008	Best Actress	Contigo de Cinema Awards	Cléopatra	Nominated	
2008	Best Actress	Quem de Cinema Awards	Cléopatra	Nominated	
2011	Best Actress	Havana Festival (Cuba)	O Abismo Prateado	Won	
2012	Best Actress	Los Angeles Brazilian Film Festival	2 Coelhos	Won	
2012	Best Co-starring Actress	Rio Festival	O Gorila	Won	
