= Cleopatra (2007 film) =

2007 film by Júlio Bressane

- Directed by: Júlio Bressane
- Written by: Júlio Bressane; Rosa Dias
- Screenplay by: Júlio Bressane
- Produced by: Lucia Fares; Tarcísio Vidigal
- Starring: Alessandra Negrini; Miguel Falabella; Bruno Garcia
- Cinematography: Walter Carvalho
- Edited by: Rodrigo Lima
- Distributed by: Grupo Novo de Cinema e TV
- Release dates: November 23, 2007 (Brasília Film Festival); May 23, 2008
- Running time: 116 minutes
- Country: Brazil
- Language: Portuguese

Cleopatra is a 2007 Brazilian epic historical drama film directed by Júlio Bressane. It stars Alessandra Negrini in the eponymous role.

== Cast ==
- Alessandra Negrini as Cleopatra
- Miguel Falabella as Julius Caesar
- Bruno Garcia as Mark Antony
- Taumaturgo Ferreira as Pothinus
- Heitor Martinez as Augustus
- Lúcio Mauro as Ptolemy XII Auletes
- Nildo Parente as Priest Karabas
- Josie Antello as Arsinoe IV of Egypt

== Release ==
The film premiered at the Brasília Film Festival on November 23, 2007.

Filmed in Copacabana, Rio de Janeiro with cinematography by Walter Carvalho (from Central Station and Carandiru), Cleopatra is defined by the filmmaker as “a lyrical vision” of the persona of the last queen of ancient Egypt.

== Awards ==
2007: Festival de Brasília

1. Best Film (won)
2. Best Actress (Alessandra Negrini) (won)
3. Best Art Direction (Moa Batsow) (won)
4. Best Cinematography (Walter Carvalho) (won)
5. Best Music (Guilherme Vaz) (won)
6. Best Sound (Leandro Lima) (won)
