= Lists of historical films =

This is an index of lists of historical films.

== By country of origin ==
- List of Estonian war films
- List of Polish war films
- List of Romanian historical films
- List of Russian historical films
- List of Vietnamese historical films

== By era ==
- List of films set in ancient Rome
- List of films set in ancient Greece
- List of films set in ancient Egypt

== By geography ==
- List of historical films set in Near Eastern and Western civilization
- List of historical films set in Asia

== By war ==
- List of war films and TV specials
- List of films about the Crusades
- List of films set during the Sengoku and Azuchi–Momoyama periods
- List of films about the American Revolution
- List of films set during the French Revolution and French Revolutionary Wars
- List of Napoleonic Wars films
- List of films about the unification of Italy
- List of films and television shows about the American Civil War
- List of films about revolutionary terrorism in the Russian Empire
- List of Second French intervention in Mexico films
- List of Boshin War and Satsuma Rebellion films
- List of Franco-Prussian War films
- List of films about the Russo-Japanese War
- List of Mexican Revolution and Cristero War films
- List of World War I films
- List of films about the Armenian genocide
- List of Irish revolutionary period films
- List of films about the Turkish War of Independence
- List of films about the Arab–Israeli conflict
- List of Spanish Civil War films
- List of films about the Spanish Maquis
- List of World War II films
- List of Greek Civil War films
- List of the First Indochina War films
- List of Korean War films
- List of films about the Algerian War
- List of Cyprus problem films
- List of Vietnam War films
- List of films about the Basque conflict
- List of Portuguese Colonial War films
- List of films about the Colombian conflict
- List of films about the Naxalite–Maoist insurgency
- List of films about the Years of Lead (Italy)
- The Troubles in film and television
- List of films about the Lebanese Civil War
- List of Iranian Revolution films
- List of Soviet–Afghan War films
- List of films about the internal conflict in Peru
- List of films about the Sri Lankan civil war
- List of Nagorno-Karabakh conflict films
- List of Yugoslav Wars films
- List of Chechen Wars films
- List of Syrian civil war films
- List of Russo-Ukrainian War films
