= List of films about the Sri Lankan civil war =

Below is an incomplete list of feature films, television films or television series which include events of the Sri Lankan civil war. This list does not include documentaries, short films.

== 1990s ==
Year	Country	Main title (Alternative title)	Original title (Original script)	Director	Subject
1999	India	The Terrorist	த டெரரிஸ்ட்	Santosh Sivan	Drama. Kalaivani Rajaratnam, Assassination of Rajiv Gandhi

== 2000s ==
Year	Country	Main title (Alternative title)	Original title (Original script)	Director	Subject
2000	Sri Lanka	Saroja	සරෝජා	Somaratne Dissanayake	Drama, Family.
2001	India	Why does the wind need a fence?	காற்றுக்கென்ன வேலி	Pugazhendhi Thangaraj	Drama.
2001	Sri Lanka	This is My Moon	මෙය මගේ සඳයි	Asoka Handagama	Drama, Romance, War.
2001	Sri Lanka; Japan	Death on a Full Moon Day	පුරහඳ කළුවර	Prasanna Vithanage	Drama, War.
2005	Sri Lanka	August Sun	ඉර මැදියම	Prasanna Vithanage	Drama.
2005	Sri Lanka; France	The Forsaken Land	සුළඟ එනු පිණිස	Vimukthi Jayasundara	Drama.
2006	Sri Lanka	Aanivaer	ஆணிவேர்	John Mahendran	War.
2006	India	Cyanide	ಸೈನೈಡ್	A. M. R. Ramesh	Crime, Drama, Thriller. Assassination of Rajiv Gandhi
2007	India	Charge Sheet	குற்றப்பத்திரிகை	R. K. Selvamani	Drama. Assassination of Rajiv Gandhi
2007	India	Mission 90 Days	മിഷൻ 90 ഡേയ്സ്	Major Ravi	Action, Crime, History, Thriller. Assassination of Rajiv Gandhi
2008	Sri Lanka	Prabhakaran	ප්‍රභාකරන්	Thushara Peiris	
2009	Sri Lanka	The Road from Elephant Pass	අලිමංකඩ	Chandran Rutnam	Action, Romance, War. Based on the novel The Road from Elephant Pass.

== 2010s ==
Year	Country	Main title (Alternative title)	Original title (Original script)	Director	Subject
2010	Sri Lanka	Under the Sun and Moon	ඉර හඳ යට	Bennett Rathnayake	Drama, Romance, War.
2011	Sri Lanka	Flying Fish	ඉගිල්ලෙන මලුවො	Sanjeewa Pushpakumara	Drama.
2011	Sri Lanka	Selvam	සෙල්වම්	Sanjaya Leelaratne	Drama, War.
2012	Sri Lanka	Matha	මාතා	Boodee Keerthisena	Action, Romance, War.
2013	India	Madras Cafe	मद्रास कैफ़े	Shoojit Sircar	Action, Drama, Thriller. Indian intervention in the Sri Lankan civil war, Assassination of Rajiv Gandhi
2013	Sri Lanka; United States	A Common Man		Chandran Rutnam	Action, Drama, Mystery, Thriller.
2014	India	Tiger's sight	புலிப்பார்வை	Pravin Gandhi	Killing of Balachandran Prabhakaran
2018	United Kingdom; United States	A Private War		Matthew Heineman	Biography, Drama, War. Based on the article Marie Colvin’s Private War. Marie Colvin
2018	India	18.05.2009		K. Ganeshan	Drama. Mullivaikkal massacre

== 2020s ==
Year	Country	Main title (Alternative title)	Original title (Original script)	Director	Subject
2020	Canada; United States	Funny Boy		Deepa Mehta	Drama. Based on the novel Funny Boy.
2020	India; Sri Lanka	Sinamkol	சினம்கொள்	Ranjith Joseph	Drama.
2021	Sri Lanka	Dark Days of Heaven	வெந்து தணிந்தது காடு	Mathi Sutha	Drama, War.
2021	India	His Excellency	மேதகு	T Kittu	Biography, History. Velupillai Prabhakaran
2022	India	His Excellency 2	மேதகு 2	RaaKo. Yoagandran	Drama. Velupillai Prabhakaran
2022	India	The Bridge of Rama	राम सेतु	Abhishek Sharma	Action, Adventure, History, Thriller.
2024	Sri Lanka	Oozhi: A Dark Age	ஊழி	Ranjith Joseph	Drama.
2025	India	Kingdom		Gowtam Tinnanuri	Action, Crime, Drama, Thriller.
2026	India	Salliyargal	சல்லியர்கள்	T. Kittu	Drama.
2026	India	Long Night	நீளிரா	Someetharan	Drama, War. Indian intervention in the Sri Lankan civil war

== Science fiction, fantasy, and horror films ==
Year	Country	Main title (Alternative title)	Original title (Original script)	Director	Subject
2017	India	It's scary!	பயமா இருக்கு	Jawahar	Comedy, Horror.

== Television series ==
Year	Country	Main title (Alternative title)	Original title (Original script)	Director	Subject
2013-16	India	24			Action, Adventure, Crime, Drama, Mystery, Thriller.
2019-25	India	The Family Man			Action, Comedy, Crime, Drama, Thriller.
2025	India	The Hunt: The Rajiv Gandhi Assassination Case		Nagesh Kukunoor	Crime, Drama, History, Thriller. Based on the book Ninety Days: The True Story of the Hunt for Rajiv Gandhi's Assassins. Assassination of Rajiv Gandhi

== Refugees ==
Year	Country	Main title (Alternative title)	Original title (Original script)	Director	Subject
1992	India	I was born for you	உனக்காக பிறந்தேன்	Balu Anand	Romance.
2000	India	Thenali	தெனாலி	K. S. Ravikumar	Comedy, Drama.
2002	India	A Peck on the Cheek	கன்னத்தில் முத்தமிட்டால்	Mani Ratnam	Action, Drama, Musical, War. Based on a short story Amuthavum Avanum.
2002	Sri Lanka; United Kingdom	In the Name of Buddha	இன் தி நேம் ஆப் புத்தா	Rajesh Touchriver	
2005	India	Chatrapathi	ఛత్రపతి	S. S. Rajamouli	Action, Drama.
2011	India	If you smell the top	உச்சிதனை முகர்ந்தால்	Pugazhendhi Thangaraj	Drama.
2011	India	The Dead Sea	செங்கடல்	Leena Manimekalai	Drama, War.
2012	India	Billa II	பில்லா 2	Chakri Toleti	Action, Crime, Thriller.
2013	India	Ceylon	இனம்	Santosh Sivan	Drama, War.
2013	India	The Land of Ravana	ராவண தேசம்	Ajay Nuthakki	Drama.
2015	France; India	Dheepan		Jacques Audiard	Crime, Drama. Based on Persian Letters and Straw Dogs.
2015	India	Red	சிவப்பு	Sathyasiva	
2018	United Kingdom	The lone palm tree	ஒற்றைப் பனை மரம்	Puthiyavan Rasaiyah	Drama.
2024	France	Little Jaffna		Lawrence Valin	Drama, Crime.
2025	India	Jaat		Gopichand Malineni	Action, Crime, Drama, Thriller.

== See also ==
- Sri Lankan civil war in popular culture
- List of films about the Tamil genocide
