= List of Russian historical films =

Historical or period drama is a film genre in which stories are based on historical events and famous persons. Some historical dramas attempt to accurately portray a historical event or biography, to the degree that the available historical research will allow. Other historical dramas are fictionalised tales that are based on an actual person and their deeds.

This is a list of films that are based on actual events. All films on this list are from Russian production unless indicated otherwise.

Not all films have remained true to the genuine history of the event or the characters they are portraying, often adding action and drama to increase the substance and popularity of the film. For films pertaining to the history of Near Eastern and Western civilisation, please refer to list of historical period drama films and series set in Near Eastern and Western civilization.

The action in the majority of the films is set in the region of modern Russia.

== Films ==
Title	Original title	Release year	Time period	Settings, Events	Personalities	External
Viking	Викинг	2016	970–1016	Kievan Rus'	Vladimir I of Kiev	
Prince Vladimir	Князь Владимир	2006	980–1015	Kievan Rus	Vladimir I of Kiev	
Knights' Novel	Рыцарский роман	2000	1096–1099	Byzantine Empire, First Crusade		
Iron Lord	Яросла́в. Ты́сячу лет наза́д	2010	1010		Yaroslav the Wise	
Mongol	Монгол	2007	1192–1227	Mongolia	Genghis Khan	
The Scythian	Скиф	2018	1090	Tmutarakan		
Alexander	Александр. Невская битва	2008	1239—1240		Alexander Nevsky	
Furious	Легенда о Коловрате	2017	1223–1242	Siege of Ryazan	Evpaty Kolovrat	
The Horde	Орда	2012	1357	Golden Horde	Alexius, Metropolitan of Kiev	
Land of Legends	Сердце Пармы	2022	1451	Great Perm	Mikhail Yermolaevich	
Czar	Царь	2009	1566—1569	Principality of Moscow, Tsardom of Russia	Ivan the Terrible	
Lady of Csejte	Кровавая леди Батори	2015	1590—1610	Kingdom of Hungary	Elizabeth Báthory	
1612	1612: Хроники смутного времени	2007	1612	Tsardom of Russia, Time of Troubles		
Russian Ark	Русский ковчег	2000	1800–2000	History of Russia	Hermitage Museum	
The Sovereign's Servant	Слуга государев	2007	1709	Battle of Poltava		
The Conquest of Siberia	Тобол	2019	1714–1716			
Peter the Great	Пётр Великий (Жизнь и смерть Петра Великого)	1910	1685—1725	Russian Empire	Peter the Great	
Tsarevich Alexei	Царевич Алексей	1997	1714—1718		Alexei Petrovich, Tsarevich of Russia	
Taras Bulba	Тарас Бульба	2009	1740		Taras Bulba	
1812	1812	1912	1812	French invasion of Russia		
The Ballad of Uhlans	Уланская баллада	2012	1812	Battle of Borodino		
Vasilisa	Василиса	2014	1812	French invasion of Russia	Vasilisa Kozhina	
Fort Ross	Форт Росс: В по́исках приключе́ний	2014	1860	Fort Ross, California		
Union of Salvation	Союз спасения	2019	1825	Decembrist revolt, Union of Salvation		
Defence of Sevastopol	Оборона Севастополя	1910	1854—1855	Siege of Sevastopol, Crimean War		
The State Counsellor	Статский советник	2005	1876	Russian Empire		
The Turkish Gambit	Турецкий гамбит	2005	1877	Russo-Turkish War (1877–1878)		
The Duelist	Дуэлянт	2016	1860	Aleutian Islands and Saint-Petersburg		
The Barber of Siberia	Сибирский цирюльник	1998	1870			
The Silver Skates	Серебряные коньки	2020	1899	Russian empire		
Yolki 1914	Ёлки 1914	2014	1914			
Admiral	Адмиралъ	2008	1914–1917, 1964	World War I, Russian Revolution, Russian Civil War	Aleksandr Kolchak	
Matilda	Матильда	2017	1890–1896		Matilda Kshesinskaya and Nicholas II	
Wild League	Дикая Лига	2019	1909			
Raspoutine	Распутин	2011	1916		Grigori Rasputin	
The Romanovs: An Imperial Family	Романовы. Венценосная семья	2000	1917	Sverdlovsk, Russian Republic	Nicholas II of Russia	
Battalion	Батальонъ	2015	1916—1917		Maria Bochkareva	
The Heritage of Love	Герой	2016	1916—1920, 2015			
Sunstroke	Солнечный удар	2014	1920	Red Terror		
Burnt by the Sun	Утомлённые со́лнцем	1994	1927—1940	Great Purge		
Burnt by the Sun 2	Утомлённые со́лнцем 2	2010	1941	Eastern Front (World War II)		
Burnt by the Sun 2: The Citadel	Утомлённые со́лнцем 2: Цитадель	2011	1943	Eastern Front (World War II)		
White Tiger	Белый тигр	2012	1943	Eastern Front (World War II)		
The Match	Матч	2012	1942	The Death Match		
Fortress of War	Брестская крепость	2010	1941	Defense of Brest Fortress, Operation Barbarossa		
Battle for Sevastopol	Битва за Севастополь	2015	1941–1942	Siege of Sevastopol	Lyudmila Pavlichenko	
Stalingrad	Сталинград	2013	1942–1943	Battle of Stalingrad, Pavlov's House		
Persian Lessons	Уроки фарси	2020	1943	The Holocaust		
V2. Escape from Hell	Девятаев	2021	1944	1st Ukrainian Front, Usedom	Mikhail Devyataev	
Panfilov's 28 Men	28 панфиловцев	2016	1941	Battle of Moscow		
The Last Frontier	Подольские курсанты	2020	1941	Battle of Moscow		
AK-47		2020	1941	Invention of AK-47	Mikhail Kalashnikov	
The Sun	Солнце	2005	1945	Hirohito		
Beanpole	Дылда	2020	1945			
The Age of Pioneers	Время первых	2017	1965	Voskhod 2	Alexei Leonov	
Gagarin: First in Space	Гагарин. Первый в космосе	2013	1960–1961	Vostok 1	Yuri Gagarin	
Paper Soldier	Бумажный солдат	2008	1960–1961	Vostok 1	Yuri Gagarin	
Dear Comrades!	Дорогие товарищи!	2020	1962	Novocherkassk massacre		
Streltsov	Стрельцо́в	2020	1958–1968	Soviet Union	Eduard Streltsov	
Vanished Empire	Исчезнувшая империя	2008	1973			
Legend No. 17	Легенда номер 17	2013	1956–1972	Summit Series	Valeri Kharlamov	
Going Vertical	Движение вверх	2017	1972	1972 Olympics		
A Dog Named Palma	Пальма	2021	1974—1976			
The Icebreaker	Ледокол	2016	1985			
Salyut 7	Салют-7	2017	1985	Soyuz T-13	Vladimir Dzhanibekov	
Chernobyl	Чернобыль	2021	1986–1987	Chernobyl disaster		
The 9th Company	9 рота	2005	1979–1989	Soviet–Afghan War, War in Afghanistan		
Leaving Afghanistan	Братство	2020	1979–1989	Soviet–Afghan War, War in Afghanistan		
Kandagar	Кандагар	2010	1995–1996	Airstan incident		
The PyraMMMid	Пирамммида	2011	1990s	MMM	Sergei Mavrodi	
Prisoner of the Mountains	Кавказский пленник	1996	1995	First Chechen War		
Alive	Живой	2006	Early 2000s	Second Chechen War		
Olympus Inferno	Олимпиус Инферно	2009	2008	Russo-Georgian War		
August Eighth	Август. Восмого	2012	2008	Russo-Georgian War		
22 Minutes	22 Минуты	2014	2010	MV Moscow University hijacking		

== See also ==
- List of historical drama films
- List of war films and TV specials
- List of costume drama films
- List of Russian films
- List of Russian submissions for the Academy Award for Best Foreign Language Film
- Cinema of Russia
- Period piece
- Epic film
- Biographical film
