= List of Portuguese Colonial War films =

Below is an incomplete list of feature films, television films or television series which include events of the Portuguese Colonial War (1961–1974). This list does not include documentaries, short films.

== 1970s ==
Year	Country	Main title (Alternative title)	Original title (Original script)	Director	Subject
1972	Angola; France	Sambizanga		Sarah Maldoror	Drama. Based on a novel The Real Life of Domingos Xavier.
1974	Portugal; Angola	Maltese, bourgeois and sometimes...	Malteses, burgueses e às vezes...	Artur Semedo	Adventure, Comedy, Crime.
1976	Portugal	The Ghosts of Alcacer-Kibir	Os Demónios de Alcácer Quibir	José Fonseca e Costa	Drama
1979	Soviet Union; Italy	Life Is Beautiful	La vita è bella Жизнь прекрасна	Grigory Chukhray	Drama.
1979	Portugal	The Last Soldier	O Último Soldado	Jorge Alves Da Silva	Drama.
1979	Mozambique	Mueda, Memory and Massacre	Mueda, Memória e Massacre	Ruy Guerra	Drama.

== 1980s ==
Year	Country	Main title (Alternative title)	Original title (Original script)	Director	Subject
1980	Portugal; Austria	The Fault	A Culpa	António Victorino de Almeida	Drama, War.
1981	Portugal	Better Luck Than Death	Antes a Sorte Que Tal Morte	João Matos Silva	Comedy. Carnation Revolution
1985	Mozambique; Yugoslavia	The Time of Leopards	O Tempo dos Leopardos; Vreme leoparda	Zdravko Velimirović	Action, Drama, War.
1986	Portugal	A Portuguese Goodbye	Um Adeus Português	João Botelho	Drama.
1987	Mozambique	The Wind Blows from the North	O Vento Sopra do Norte	José Cardoso	
1988	Guinea-Bissau	Those Whom Death Refused	Mortu Nega	Flora Gomes	Drama, War.

== 1990s ==
Year	Country	Main title (Alternative title)	Original title (Original script)	Director	Subject
1990	Portugal; Spain; France; Senegal	No, or the Vain Glory of Command	Non, ou a Vã Glória de Mandar	Manoel de Oliveira	Drama, History, War.
1991	Portugal; Germany	Alex	A Idade Maior	Teresa Villaverde	Drama.
1994	Netherlands; Guinea-Bissau	Xime		Sana Na N'Hada	Drama.
1995	Portugal		Ao Sul	Fernando Matos Silva	Drama.
1999	Portugal; Spain		Inferno	Joaquim Leitão	Action, Crime, Thriller.

== 2000s ==
Year	Country	Main title (Alternative title)	Original title (Original script)	Director	Subject
2000	France; Portugal; Spain; Italy	April Captains	Capitães de Abril	Maria de Medeiros	Drama, History, War. Salgueiro Maia, Carnation Revolution
2003	Portugal; United Kingdom; Luxembourg	The Immortals	Os Imortais	António-Pedro Vasconcelos	Action, Crime, Drama, War. Based on a novel Os Lobos Não Usam Coleira.
2003	Portugal	Black and white	Preto E Branco	José Carlos de Oliveira	
2004	Portugal	The Murmuring Coast	A Costa dos Murmúrios	Margarida Cardoso	Drama. Based on a novel A Costa dos Murmúrios.
2006	Portugal	20.13: Purgatory	20,13 Purgatório	Joaquim Leitão	Drama, Mystery, War.

== 2010s ==
Year	Country	Main title (Alternative title)	Original title (Original script)	Director	Subject
2012	Angola; Portugal; Brazil	The Great Kilapy	O Grande Kilapy	Zézé Gamboa	Comedy, Crime, Drama.
2013	Switzerland; France; Portugal	Longwave	Les Grandes Ondes (à l'ouest); As Ondas de Abril	Lionel Baier	Comedy, Drama, History. Carnation Revolution
2016	Portugal; Germany	Letters from War	Cartas da Guerra	Ivo Ferreira	Drama. Based on a novel D'este viver aqui neste papel descripto: Cartas da guerra.
2016	United Kingdom	Mona		Onuora Abuah	History, Thriller.

== 2020s ==
Year	Country	Main title (Alternative title)	Original title (Original script)	Director	Subject
2020	Portugal	War	Guerra	José Oliveira; Marta Ramos; Mariana Parasense	Drama.
2021	Portugal	The Sound That Descends to Earth	O Som Que Desce na Terra	Sérgio Graciano	Drama.
2022	Portugal; France; Angola	Tommy Guns	Nação Valente	Carlos Conceição	Adventure, Drama, War.
2022	Portugal	Salgueiro Maia: The Implicated	Salgueiro Maia - O Implicado	Sérgio Graciano	Biography, Drama. Salgueiro Maia
2023	Guinea-Bissau; France; Portugal; Angola	Nome		Sana Na N'Hada	Drama, War.
2024	Portugal	Your Face Will Be the Last	O Teu Rosto Será o Último	Luís Filipe Rocha	Drama. Based on a novel O Teu Rosto Será o Último.

== Science fiction, fantasy and horror ==
Year	Country	Main title (Alternative title)	Original title (Original script)	Director	Subject
2017	Portugal; Angola	The Dogs' Island	A Ilha dos Cães	Jorge António	Adventure, Drama, Fantasy, Horror.

== Television films ==
Year	Country	Main title (Alternative title)	Original title (Original script)	Director	Subject
1988	Portugal	Once Upon a Time There Was an Ensign	Era Uma Vez Um Alferes	Luís Filipe Costa	Drama. Based on a novel Era uma vez um Alferes.

== Television series ==
Year	Country	Main title (Alternative title)	Original title (Original script)	Director	Subject
2023	Portugal	Salgueiro Maia - The Implicated: The Series	Salgueiro Maia - O Implicado: A Série	Sérgio Graciano	Biography, Drama. Salgueiro Maia
