= Enxalé =

- Village
- Location in Guinea-Bissau
- Coordinates: 11°59′N 14°58′W
- Country: Guinea-Bissau
- Region: Oio Region
- Sector: Mansôa
- Time zone: UTC+0 (GMT)

Enxalé is a village in the Oio Region of western-central Guinea-Bissau. It lies near the confluence of the Geba and Corubal rivers.

== Notable Person ==
- Sana Na N'Hada (1950–) — film director
