= List of films about the Crusades =

Below is an incomplete list of feature films, television films or television series which include events of the Crusades. This list does not include documentaries, short films.

== Films ==
Year	Country	Main title (Alternative title)	Original title (Original script)	Director	Subject
1918	Italy	The Crusaders	La Gerusalemme liberata	Enrico Guazzoni	Drama, History. Based on the poem Jerusalem Delivered. First Crusade, Siege of Jerusalem (1099), Godfrey of Bouillon
1923	United States	Richard the Lion-Hearted		Chester Withey	Drama. Based on a novel The Talisman. Third Crusade, Richard I of England, Saladin
1935	United States	The Crusades		Cecil B. DeMille	Adventure, Drama, History, War. Third Crusade, Richard I of England, Berengaria of Navarre
1954	United States	King Richard and the Crusaders		David Butler	Adventure, Family, History, Romance, War. Based on a novel The Talisman. Third Crusade, Richard I of England, Saladin
1957	Italy	The Mighty Crusaders	Gerusalemme liberata	Carlo Ludovico Bragaglia	Action, Adventure, Drama, History. Based on the poem Jerusalem Delivered. First Crusade, Siege of Jerusalem (1099), Godfrey of Bouillon
1963	Egypt	Saladin the Victorious	الناصر صلاح الدين	Youssef Chahine	Action, Adventure, Biography, Drama, History, Romance, War. Third Crusade, Richard I of England, Saladin
1964	Italy; Spain	The Revenge of the Crusader	Genoveffa di Brabante	José Luis Monter	Drama. Genevieve of Brabant
1966	Italy; France; Spain	For Love and Gold	L'armata Brancaleone	Mario Monicelli	Adventure, Comedy, History.
1968	United Kingdom; Yugoslavia	Gates to Paradise	Vrata Raja	Andrzej Wajda	Drama. Based on a novel The Gates of Paradise. Children's Crusade
1968	Italy	The Two Crusaders	I due crociati	Giuseppe Orlandini	Comedy, History.
1970	Turkey; Iran		Selahattin Eyyubi	Süreyya Duru	Biography, History, War. Third Crusade, Richard I of England, Saladin
1971	United Kingdom	Up the Chastity Belt		Bob Kellett	Comedy.
1978	France; Belgium	God Wills It So	Deus lo volt Dieu le veut	Luc Monheim; Jef Van de Water	Drama.
1987	Hungary; United States	Lionheart		Franklin J. Schaffner	Adventure, Drama. Children's Crusade
1992	Russia	Richard the Lionheart	Ричард Львиное Сердце	Yevgeni Gerasimov	Adventure, History, War. Based on a novel The Talisman. Third Crusade, Richard I of England, Saladin
1993	Russia	Knight Kenneth	Рыцарь Кеннет	Yevgeni Gerasimov	Adventure, History, War. Based on a novel The Talisman. Third Crusade, Richard I of England, Saladin
2001	Italy; France	The Knights of the Quest	I Cavalieri che fecero l'impresa	Pupi Avati	Adventure, Drama, History, War. Based on a novel I Cavalieri che fecero l'impresa. Eighth Crusade, Shroud of Turin
2001	United States; Aruba	The Order		Sheldon Lettich	Action, Adventure, Comedy. First Crusade, Siege of Jerusalem (1099)
2005	United Kingdom; Germany; Spain; Morocco; United States; Italy; France	Kingdom of Heaven		Ridley Scott	Action, Adventure, Drama, History, War. Balian of Ibelin, Saladin
2005	United States	Soldier of God		W.D. Hogan	Drama.
2007	Sweden; United Kingdom; Denmark; Norway; Finland; Germany; Morocco	Arn: The Knight Templar	Arn: Tempelriddaren	Peter Flinth	Action, Drama, Romance, War. Based on the Crusades trilogy novels.
2008	Denmark; Sweden; Finland; United Kingdom; Norway; Germany	Arn – The Kingdom at Road's End	Arn – Riket vid vägens slut	Peter Flinth	Action, Drama, Romance, War. Based on the Crusades trilogy novels.
2011	Spain	Captain Thunder	El Capitán Trueno y el Santo Grial	Antonio Hernández	Action, Adventure. Based on the comics Capitán Trueno.
2014	China; United States; France; Canada; Australia; Luxembourg	Outcast		Nick Powell	Action, Adventure, Thriller.
2017	Ireland; Belgium	Pilgrimage		Brendan Muldowney	Action, Drama, History.
2017	Czech Republic; Slovakia; Italy	Little Crusader	Křižáček	Václav Kadrnka	Drama, History. Based on the poem Svojanovský křižáček. Children's Crusade
2018	United States; Hong Kong; United Kingdom; France	Robin Hood		Otto Bathurst	Action, Adventure, Drama, Thriller.

== Science fiction, fantasy, and horror films ==
Year	Country	Main title (Alternative title)	Original title (Original script)	Director	Subject
1970	Italy; Algeria	Brancaleone at the Crusades	Brancaleone alle Crociate	Mario Monicelli	Adventure, Fantasy, History.
1983	Italy	Hearts and Armour	I Paladini: Storia d'armi e d'amori	Giacomo Battiato	Action, Adventure, Fantasy. Based on the poems Orlando Innamorato, Orlando Furioso.
1994	Germany	The High Crusade	High Crusade – Frikassee im Weltraum	Klaus Knoesel; Holger Neuhäuser	Adventure, Comedy, Sci-Fi. Based on a novel The High Crusade.
2006	Netherlands; Belgium; Luxembourg; Germany	Crusade in Jeans	Kruistocht in spijkerbroek	Ben Sombogaart	Adventure, Family, Fantasy, Sci-Fi, War. Based on a novel Crusade in Jeans. Children's Crusade
2009	Denmark; United Kingdom	Valhalla Rising		Nicolas Winding Refn	Adventure, Drama, Fantasy.
2011	United States	Season of the Witch		Dominic Sena	Action, Adventure, Fantasy.

== Television films ==
Year	Country	Main title (Alternative title)	Original title (Original script)	Director	Subject
1988	France	The Children's Crusade	La Croisade des enfants	Serge Moati	Drama. Children's Crusade
1992	France	Blood and Dust	De terre et de sang	Jim Goddard	Adventure.
2000	Russia	Chivalric romance	Рыцарский роман	Aleksandr Inshakov	Drama. Based on a novel Count Robert of Paris. First Crusade
2001	Italy; Germany	The Crusaders	Crociati	Dominique Othenin-Girard	Adventure, Drama. First Crusade
2010	United States	Dark Relic		Lorenzo Sena	Fantasy, Horror.

== Television series ==
Year	Country	Main title (Alternative title)	Original title (Original script)	Director	Subject
1968-1969	France	Desert Crusader	Thibaud ou les Croisades		Action, Adventure.
1972	United Kingdom	The Adventures of Sir Prancelot			Animation, Adventure, Family.
1980-1	United Kingdom	The Talisman		Richard Bramall	Adventure, Drama. Based on a novel The Talisman.
2001	Syria	Salah Al-deen Al-Ayyobi	صلاح الدين الأيوبي	Hatem Ali	Biography, History. Saladin, Battle of Hattin
2010	Sweden	Arn: The Knight Templar	Arn	Peter Flinth	Action, Drama, Romance, War. Based on the Crusades trilogy novels.
2010	Malaysia; Qatar	Saladin: The Animated Series	صلاح الدين		Animation. Saladin
2012	Germany; United Kingdom; South Africa; Czech Republic	Labyrinth		Christopher Smith	Adventure, Drama, Fantasy, History. Based on a novel Labyrinth.
2017-19	United States	Knightfall			Action, Adventure, Drama, History.
2023-25	Turkey	Saladin: The Conqueror of Jerusalem	Kudüs Fatihi Selahaddin Eyyubi	Sedat Inci	Action, History. Saladin

== Iberian Crusades ==
Year	Country	Main title (Alternative title)	Original title (Original script)	Director	Subject
1961	Italy; United States	El Cid		Anthony Mann	Biography, Drama, History, Romance, War. El Cid
1963	Spain; United States	The Castilian	El valle de las espadas	Javier Setó	Drama. Fernán González of Castile
1964	Italy; Spain; West Germany	100 Horsemen	I cento cavalieri	Vittorio Cottafavi	Action, Adventure, Comedy, Drama, History.
1972	Spain	The Paladins	Los paladines	Juan García Atienza	Adventure, Drama.
1980	Pakistan	The Falcon	شاہین; Shaheen		History. Based on a novel Shaheen.
1991	Spain; West Germany; Italy	Requiem for Granada	Réquiem por Granada	Vicente Escrivá	Drama, History, Romance, War. Granada War
2003	Spain	El Cid: The Legend	El Cid, la leyenda	José Pozo	Animation, Adventure, Biography, Family, Fantasy, Romance. El Cid
2003	Syria	Spring of Cordoba	ربيع قرطبة	Hatem Ali	Drama, History. Based on a novel Cordoba Dates.
2012	Spain	Toledo	Toledo, cruce de destinos		Adventure, Drama, History. Alfonso X of Castile
2012-14	Spain	Isabel		Jordi Frades	Biography, History. Isabella I of Castile
2017	Spain	The Way's End	El final del camino	Alberto Guntín; Xosé Morais; Víctor Sierra	Adventure, Drama, History. Santiago de Compostela Cathedral
2020-21	Spain	El Cid			Action, Drama, History, War. El Cid

== Northern Crusades ==
Year	Country	Main title (Alternative title)	Original title (Original script)	Director	Subject
1930	Latvia		Lāčplēsis	Aleksandrs Rusteiķis	Action, Fantasy, History, Romance, War. Lāčplēsis
1938	Soviet Union	Alexander Nevsky	Александр Невский	Sergei Eisenstein; Dmitri Vasilyev	Action, Biography, Drama, History, War. Livonian campaign against Rus' (1240-1242), 1240 Izborsk and Pskov campaign, Battle on the Ice, Alexander Nevsky
1960	Poland	Knights of the Teutonic Order	Krzyżacy	Aleksander Ford	Adventure, Drama, History, Romance, War. Based on a novel The Knights of the Cross. Polish–Lithuanian–Teutonic War, Battle of Grunwald
1968	Czechoslovakia	The Valley of the Bees	Údolí včel	František Vláčil	Drama.
1969-70	Poland	Gniewko, the fisherman's son	Gniewko, syn rybaka	Bohdan Poręba	Adventure, History.
1971	Poland	The Ring of Princess Ann	Pierścień księżnej Anny	Maria Kaniewska	Family, History, Sci-Fi.
1972	Soviet Union	Northern Crusades	Геркус Мантас; Herkus Mantas	Marijonas Giedrys	Drama, History. Second Prussian Uprising, Herkus Monte
1975	Poland; Czechoslovakia; East Germany; France	Casimir the Great	Kazimierz Wielki	Czesław Petelski; Ewa Petelska	Biography, Drama, History. Casimir III the Great
1978	Poland	Eagle sign	Znak orła	Hubert Drapella	Adventure, Drama, History. Heinrich von Plauen, Władysław I Łokietek, Casimir III the Great
2005	Poland	1409. The Bartenstein Castle Scandal	1409. Afera na zamku Bartenstein	Rafał Buks; Paweł Czarzasty	Comedy.
2008	Russia	Alexander	Александр. Невская битва	Igor Kalyonov	Action, History, War. Livonian campaign against Rus' (1240-1242), Battle on the Ice, Alexander Nevsky
2018	United Kingdom; Latvia	The Pagan King	Nameja gredzens	Aigars Grauba	Action, Drama, History, War. Nameisis

== Hussite Wars ==
Year	Country	Main title (Alternative title)	Original title (Original script)	Director	Subject
1947	Czechoslovakia	Warriors of Faith	Jan Roháč z Dubé	Vladimír Borský	Drama, War. Based on the play Jan Roháč. Jan Roháč of Dubá
1955	Czechoslovakia	Jan Žižka		Otakar Vávra	Drama, War. Based on the play Jan Žižka. Jan Žižka, Jan Želivský
1956	Czechoslovakia	Against All	Proti všem	Otakar Vávra	Drama, War. Based on a novel Proti všem. First Crusade against the Hussites, Sigismund, Jan Žižka, Peter Kániš
1963	Czechoslovakia	The Nuremberg Campaign (Beautiful Ride)	Spanilá jízda	Oldřich Daněk	Drama, History, War. Elegant rides
1968	Czechoslovakia	On Zizka's Battle Waggon	Na Žižkově válečném voze	Milan Vošmik	Adventure, Drama, Family, History.
1970	Czechoslovakia	Žižek's Sword	Žižkův meč	Vladimír Čech	
1982	Czechoslovakia	An incredible story	Neuvěřitelný příběh	Věra Jordánová	Family, Fantasy.
1986	Czechoslovakia	Sigismund, called the Red-haired Beast	Zikmund řečený Šelma ryšavá	Jiří Bělka	Drama, History. Sigismund
2015	Czech Republic	Jan Hus		Jiří Svoboda	Biography, Drama, History. Jan Hus
2022	Czech Republic	Medieval	Jan Žižka	Petr Jákl	Action, Drama, History, War. Jan Žižka
