= List of Spanish Civil War films =

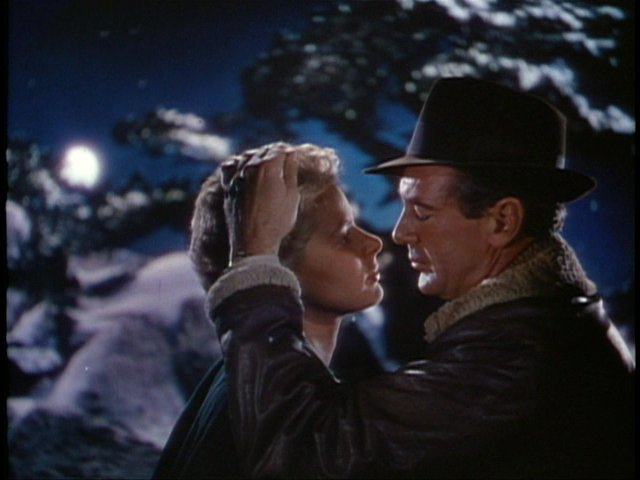
Spanish guerrillera and American anti-Fascist in For Whom the Bell Tolls

Below is an incomplete list of fictional feature films which include events of the Spanish Civil War (1936–1939) in the narrative.

For short films about the Spanish Civil War, see the List of World War II short films.

For films about the Spanish Maquis see List of films about the Spanish Maquis.

== 1930s ==
Year	Country	Main title (Alternative title)	Original title (Original script)	Director	Battles, campaigns, events depicted
1937	Spain	Dawn of Hope	Aurora de esperanza	Antonio Sau Olite	Drama.
1937	United States	Love Under Fire		George Marshall	Crime, Drama, Romance, War.
1937	United States	The Last Train from Madrid		James P. Hogan	Action, Adventure, Drama, Romance, War. Refugees flee bombing of Madrid
1938	United States	Blockade		William Dieterle	Drama, Romance, War. Peasant supports the Republic
1938	Nazi Germany	Comrades at Sea	Kameraden auf See	Heinz Paul	War. German sailors save Spanish civilians at the beginning of the Civil War
1938	Mexico	Refugees in Madrid	Refugiados en Madrid	Alejandro Galindo	Drama, Romance, War. Refugees in Madrid
1938–39	France; Spain	Days of Hope or Man's Hope	Espoir: Sierra de Teruel	Boris Peskine; André Malraux	Drama, War. Shows defense of the 2nd Spanish Republic by the Republican air force, filmed on location in northeastern Spain. Includes scenes of street fighting and a bombing raid. Based on a novel Man's Hope.
1939	Italy		Carmen fra i rossi	Edgar Neville	Drama, War. Based on the short story Frente de Madrid.

== 1940s ==
Year	Country	Main title (Alternative title)	Original title (Original script)	Director	Battles, campaigns, events depicted
1940	Nazi Germany	Request Concert	Wunschkonzert	Eduard von Borsody	Musical, Romance, War. Condor Legion
1940	United States	Arise, My Love		Mitchell Leisen	Comedy, Drama, Romance. Spanish Civil War through French capitulation, 1940
1940	Italy; Spain	The Man of the Legion	L'uomo della legione	Romolo Marcellini	Drama, War. Italian veteran of the War of Ethiopia volunteers to fight for the Falange in Spain
1940	Italy; Spain	The Siege of the Alcazar	L'assedio dell'Alcazar; Sin novedad en el Alcázar	Augusto Genina	Drama, War. Siege of the Alcázar in Toledo, 1936
1940	Italy	The Thrill of the Skies	L'ebbrezza del cielo	Giorgio Ferroni	A group of Italian aspiring young pilots construct a glider and then volunteer for service in the Spanish Civil War
1941	Spain	Because i saw you cry	Porque te vi llorar	Juan de Orduña	Drama.
1941	Spain	The Cruiser Baleares	El crucero Baleares	Enrique del Campo	War. Spanish cruiser Baleares, Battle of Cape Palos (1938)
1941	Spain	The Squadron	Escuadrilla	Antonio Román	Drama, War. Two pilots of the Falange
1942	Soviet Union	Lad from Our Town	Парень из нашего города	Aleksandr Stolper; Boris Ivanov	Drama, War. Based on the play Lad from Our Town.
1942	Spain	Wedding in hell	Boda en el infierno	Antonio Román	Drama, War.
1942	Spain	Race	Raza	José Luis Sáenz de Heredia	Biography, Drama, History, War.
1942	Spain	Red and Black	Rojo y negro	Carlos Arévalo Calvet	Drama, War. Falange's fifth column in Madrid
1943	United States	The Fallen Sparrow		Richard Wallace	Film-Noir, Mystery. Spy thriller based on Dorothy B. Hughes novel
1943	United States	For Whom the Bell Tolls		Sam Wood	Adventure, Drama, History, Romance, War. Drama based on Ernest Hemingway novel. American joins guerrillas in attack on bridge
1943	Italy	Special Correspondents	Inviati speciali	Romolo Marcellini	Drama. An Italian journalist discovers an enemy female agent in the Spanish Civil War and then in Egypt during World War II
1945	United Kingdom	The Man from Morocco		Mutz Greenbaum	Action, Adventure.
1945	United States	Confidential Agent		Herman Shumlin	Drama, Thriller.
1949	Spain	The sanctuary does not give up	El santuario no se rinde	Arturo Ruiz Castillo	Drama, War. Siege of Santuario de Nuestra Señora de la Cabeza
1949	Spain	Life in Shadows	Vida en sombras	Lorenzo Llobet Gràcia	Drama.

== 1950s ==
Year	Country	Main title (Alternative title)	Original title (Original script)	Director	Battles, campaigns, events depicted
1951	Spain	Facing the Sea	Rostro al mar	Carlos Serrano de Osma	Drama, War.
1951	Spain	Close to heaven	Cerca del cielo	Domingo Viladomat	Biography, Drama, War.
1951	Spain	Reckless	Balarrasa	José Antonio Nieves Conde	Crime, Drama.
1951	Spain	Service at Sea	Servicio en la mar	Luis Suárez de Lezo	Drama, War.
1952	United States	The Snows of Kilimanjaro		Henry King	Adventure, Drama, Romance, War.
1954	Spain	Two Paths	Dos caminos	Arturo Ruiz Castillo	Drama, War.
1954	Spain	The patrol	La patrulla	Pedro Lazaga	Drama, War.
1955	East Germany	Ernst Thälmann - leader of his class	Ernst Thälmann – Führer seiner Klasse	Kurt Maetzig	Biography, Drama, History.
1955	West German	As Long as You Live	Solange du lebst	Harald Reinl	Drama.
1956	East Germany	I am thirsty	Mich dürstet	Karl Paryla	Drama, War. Based on short story Um Spaniens Freiheit.
1957	East Germany	Where you are going	Wo Du hin gehst	Martin Hellberg	War.
1958	Spain	Heroes of the Air	Héroes del aire	Ramón Torrado	Adventure, Drama, War.
1959	Spain	The infinite front	El frente infinito	Pedro Lazaga	Drama, War.

== 1960s ==
Year	Country	Main title (Alternative title)	Original title (Original script)	Director	Battles, campaigns, events depicted
1960	Spain; France	The Crossroads	La encrucijada	Alfonso Balcázar	Drama.
1960	East Germany	People with wings	Leute mit Flügeln	Konrad Wolf	War, Drama.
1960	Spain	The faithful infantry	La fiel infantería	Pedro Lazaga	Drama, War.
1960	United States; Italy	The Angel Wore Red	La sposa bella	Nunnally Johnson	Action, Drama, War, Romance. Romantic drama from Bruce Marshall novel
1960	East Germany	Five Cartridges	Fünf Patronenhülsen	Frank Beyer	War.
1961	France	The Spanish Festival	La Fête espagnole	Jean-Jacques Vierne	Drama, War.
1962	Spain	Clean wheat	Trigo limpio	Ignacio F. Iquino	Drama, War. Red Terror
1962	Mexico	On the empty balcony	En el balcón vacío	Jomí García Ascot	Drama.
1962	Spain	A Land for All	Tierra de todos	Antonio Isasi-Isasmendi	Drama, War.
1965	East Germany; Soviet Union	They Shall Not Pass	Они не пройдут	Siegfried Kühn	Drama, War. Based on a novel Comrade Hans.
1966	Spain	Advanced position	Posición avanzada	Pedro Lazaga	Drama, War.
1966	Spain	The lost eyes	Los ojos perdidos	Rafael García Serrano	Drama, War.
1966	Soviet Union; Latvia	Nocturne	Ноктюрн; Noktirne	Rostislav Goryayev	Drama, War.
1967	France	The Wall	Le Mur	Serge Roullet	Drama. Based on short story The Wall.
1968	Spain	Crusade at sea	Cruzada en la mar	Isidoro Martínez-Vela	Drama, War. Spanish cruiser Almirante Cervera
1968	Soviet Union	This moment	Это мгновение Šis mirklis	Emil Loteanu	Drama, War.
1969	United Kingdom	The Prime of Miss Jean Brodie		Ronald Neame	Comedy, Drama, Romance.
1969	Spain	The other tree of Guernica	El otro árbol de Guernica	Pedro Lazaga	Biography, Drama. Based on a novel El otro árbol de Guernica.

== 1970s ==
Year	Country	Main title (Alternative title)	Original title (Original script)	Director	Battles, campaigns, events depicted
1970	Soviet Union	Hail, Mary!	Салют, Мария!	Iosif Kheifits	Drama. Mariya Fortus
1970	Spain; Italy	Hand Strike (Explosion)	Golpe de mano (Explosión)	José Antonio de la Loma	Action, Drama, War. Battle of the Ebro
1971	Spain	The rebel mountain	La montaña rebelde	Ramón Torrado	War, Drama.
1971	Spain	The shore	La orilla	Luis Lucia	Drama.
1971	Soviet Union	Officers	Офицеры	Vladimir Rogovoy	Drama, Romance, War.
1972	Spain	The house of chivas	La casa de las chivas	León Klimovsky	Drama. Based on the play La casa de las chivas.
1975	Bulgaria	Doomed Souls	Osadeni Dushi; Осъдени Души	Vulo Radev	Drama, Romance, War. Romance drama based on Dimitar Dimov novel
1975	Soviet Union	Mirror	Зеркало	Andrei Tarkovsky	Biography, Drama.
1975	East Germany; Soviet Union; Yugoslavia; France	Between Day and Night	Zwischen Nacht und Tag	Horst E. Brandt	Erich Weinert
1975	France; Italy	The Tree of Guernica	L' Arbre de Guernica	Fernando Arrabal	Drama, War.
1976	Spain	The Legion Like Women	A la Legión le gustan las mujeres	Rafael Gil	Comedy.
1976	Spain	Long Vacations of 36	Las largas vacaciones del 36	Jaime Camino	Drama, History.
1976	Spain	Family Portrait	Retrato de Familia	Antonio Giménez-Rico	Drama, War.
1976	Italy	A Sold Life	Una vita venduta	Aldo Florio	War. Two Italian soldiers of the Corpo Truppe Volontarie. Based on Leonardo Sciascia short novel L'antimonio
1977	Spain	Let's have the war in peace	Tengamos la guerra en paz	Eugenio Martín	Comedy.
1977	Spain	One of the million dead	Uno del millón de muertos	Andrés Velasco Rubio	Drama.
1977	Soviet Union; Hungary	Code Name Lukács	Псевдоним: Лукач; Fedőneve: Lukács	Manos Zacharias	Biography. Hungarian writer, political exile and XII International Brigade commander Máté Zalka's final months.
1978	Spain	Soldiers	Soldados	Alfonso Ungría	Drama.
1978	Soviet Union; Switzerland	The Velvet season	Бархатный сезон	Vladimir Pavlovich	Drama, War.
1979	Spain	Companys, procés a Catalunya	Companys, proceso a Cataluña	Josep Maria Forn	Biography, Drama, History.

== 1980s ==
Year	Country	Main title (Alternative title)	Original title (Original script)	Director	Battles, campaigns, events depicted
1980	Soviet Union	Spanish version	Испанский вариант Spāņu variants	Ēriks Lācis	Thriller. Based on a novel Spanish version.
1980	Italy	Quiet country women	Tranquille donne di campagna	Claudio Giorgi	Drama.
1980	Spain	Stubble land	Tierra de rastrojos	Antonio Gonzalo	
1981	France	The Red Shadow	L'Ombre rouge	Jean-Louis Comolli	Drama, Thriller.
1982	Spain	Diamond Square	La plaça del Diamant	Francesc Betriu	Drama. Based on a novel The Time of the Doves.
1984	Spain	Memoirs of General Escobar	Memorias del General Escobar	José Luis Madrid	Drama. Based on a memoir. Antonio Escobar Huertas
1984	Spain	Bicycles Are for the Summer	Las bicicletas son para el verano	Jaime Chávarri	Drama.
1985	Spain	Requiem for a Spanish Peasant	Réquiem por un campesino español	Francesc Betriu	Drama.
1985	Spain	The Heifer	La vaquilla	Luis García Berlanga	Comedy, War.
1986	Spain	The War of the Madmen	La guerra de los locos	Manolo Matji	Drama.
1986	Spain	The Bastard Brother of God	El hermano bastardo de Dios	Benito Rabal	Drama, War. Based on a novel El hermano bastardo de Dios.
1986	Spain	Dragon Rapide		Jaime Camino	Drama, History. Gen. Franco prepares his uprising against the Republic from Spanish Morocco, 1936
1986	Spain	Voyage to Nowhere	El viaje a ninguna parte	Fernando Fernán Gómez	Comedy, Drama. Comedy-drama based on director's novel. Travelling comedy troupe during war and post-war Francoist Spain
1987	Spain	To the four winds	A los cuatro vientos	José Antonio Zorrilla; Arantxa Urretabizkaia	Drama. Lauaxeta, Bombing of Guernica
1987	Spain	Hooray for the band!	¡Biba la banda!	Ricardo Palacios	Comedy, War.
1988	Soviet Union; Poland; Czechoslovakia; Hungary; Bulgaria; East Germany; Spain	Faithfulness We Pledge	Верными останемся Верни ще останем Wir bleiben treu Věrni zůstaneme Pozostaniemy wierni	Andrei Malyukov	Drama, War.

== 1990s ==
Year	Country	Main title (Alternative title)	Original title (Original script)	Director	Battles, campaigns, events depicted
1990	Spain; Italy	¡Ay, Carmela!	¡Ay Carmela!	Carlos Saura	Comedy, Drama, War.
1990	Canada; France; China	Bethune: The Making of a Hero	(Note: This film is an international co-production shot in English.)	Phillip Borsos	Biography, Drama, Romance, War. Montreal doctor Norman Bethune in Spain, then China for Sino-Japanese War
1991	Spain	Cows	Vacas	Julio Medem	Drama, Mystery, Romance, War.
1992	Spain; France	The Long Winter	El largo invierno	Jaime Camino	Drama, History, War.
1995	Spain; Portugal; France	Fire Signs	Sinais de Fogo	Luís Filipe Rocha	Drama, Romance. Based on a novel Sinais de Fogo.
1995	France		Fiesta	Pierre Boutron	Drama based on the novel by José Luis de Vilallonga
1995	United Kingdom; Spain; Germany; Italy; France; United States	Land and Freedom		Ken Loach	Drama, War. Historical drama with similarities to George Orwell's book Homage to Catalonia.
1996	Spain; Italy; Belgium	Libertarians (Freedomfighters)	Libertarias	Vicente Aranda	Drama, History, War.
1997	Spain	In Praise of Older Women	En brazos de la mujer madura	Manuel Lombardero	Drama, Romance, War.
1997	Spain; France; United States; Puerto Rico	The Disappearance of Garcia Lorca		Marcos Zurinaga	Biography, Drama, Mystery, Thriller. Based on a novel La represión nacionalista de Granada en 1936 y la muerte de Federico García Lorca. Poet Federico García Lorca, 1936
1998	Spain	The Pianist	El Pianista	Mario Gas	Drama. Based on a novel El Pianista.
1998	United States	Talk of Angels		Nick Hamm	Drama, Romance, War. Based on a novel Mary Lavelle.
1998	Spain	A Time for Defiance	La hora de los valientes	Antonio Mercero	Drama, Romance, War.
1998	Spain	The Girl of Your Dreams	La niña de tus ojos	Fernando Trueba	Comedy, Drama. Actress Imperio Argentina and pro-Franco movie-makers travel to Nazi Germany
1999	Spain	Butterfly's Tongue	La lengua de las mariposas	José Luis Cuerda	Drama, War. Based on a novels La lengua de las mariposas, Un saxo en la niebla, Carmiña.

== 2000s ==
Year	Country	Main title (Alternative title)	Original title (Original script)	Director	Battles, campaigns, events depicted
2000	Spain	The Sea	El mar	Agustí Villaronga	Drama, War.
2002	Spain; Portugal	Carol's Journey	El viaje de Carol	Imanol Uribe	Drama, History. A young girl moves from America to her mother's town in Spain in 1938.
2003	Spain	A singular passion	Una pasión singular	Antonio Gonzalo	Biography, Drama. Blas Infante
2003	Spain	The End of a Mystery	La luz prodigiosa	Miguel Hermoso	Drama. Based on a novel La luz prodigiosa. Federico García Lorca
2003	Spain	The Carpenter's Pencil	El lápiz del carpintero	Antón Reixa	Drama. Based on a novel The Carpenter's Pencil.
2003	Spain	Soldiers of Salamina	Soldados de Salamis	David Trueba	Drama. Based on a novel Soldiers of Salamis.
2004	Spain	Iris		Rosa Vergés	Drama.
2004	Canada; United Kingdom	Head in the Clouds		John Duigan	Drama, Romance, War.
2007	Spain; Italy	13 Roses	Las 13 Rosas	Emilio Martínez-Lázaro	Drama, History. Las Trece Rosas
2008	Spain	The book of waters	El libro de las aguas	Antonio Giménez-Rico	Drama. Based on a novel El libro de las aguas.
2008	Spain	The Good News	La buena nueva	Helena Taberna	Drama. Marino Ayerra, White Terror
2008	Germany; Spain; France	The Anarchist's Wife	La mujer del anarquista	Peter Sehr; Marie Noëlle	Drama, History.

== 2010s ==
Year	Country	Main title (Alternative title)	Original title (Original script)	Director	Battles, campaigns, events depicted
2010	Spain	Stars to reach	Izarren argia	Mikel Rueda	Drama. Saturararan Women's Prison
2011	Spain	Spanish people!	Ispansi!	Carlos Iglesias	Drama, History, Romance, War. Secret Falangist escorts orphans to USSR in time for Second World War
2011	United States; Spain; Argentina	There Be Dragons		Roland Joffé	Biography, Drama, War. Josemaría Escrivá
2013	Spain	Bernabé		Pablo Casanueva	Drama.
2013	Spain; United Kingdom	The Mule	La mula	Michael Radford; Sebastien Grousset	Adventure, Comedy, Drama.
2013	Spain	A Forbidden God	Un Dios prohibido	Pablo Moreno	Drama, History. Martyrs of the Spanish Civil War, Religious persecution during the Spanish Civil War, Red Terror
2014	Spain	The memory of the olive trees	La memoria de los olivos	Raúl Romera	
2014	Spain	The pit	La fossa	Pere Vilà Barceló	Drama.
2014	Spain	Under a Blanket of Stars	Bajo un manto de estrellas	Óscar Parra de Carrizosa	Drama, History. Martyrs of the Spanish Civil War, Religious persecution during the Spanish Civil War, Red Terror
2015	Spain	The banishment	El destierro	Arturo Ruiz Serrano	Drama.
2016	Spain	Dance in the Union	Baile en el Sindicato	Fran Longoria	War.
2016	Spain; United States	Guernica	Gernika	Koldo Serra	Drama, History, Romance, War. Bombing of Guernica
2017	Spain	Elephants	Elefantes	Carlos Balbuena	Drama.
2017	Spain	The Bastards' Fig Tree	La higuera de los bastardos	Ana Murugarren	Comedy, Drama, Thriller.
2017	Spain	Uncertain Glory	Incerta glòria	Agustí Villaronga	Drama based on the novel from Joan Sales.
2019	Spain	So a hundred years pass	Así que pasen cien años	Mau Cardoso	
2019	Spain; Argentina	While at War	Mientras Dure la Guerra	Alejandro Amenábar	Drama, History, War. Miguel de Unamuno
2019	Spain; France; Canada	The Endless Trench	La Trinchera Infinita	Jon Garaño; Aitor Arregi Galdos; Jose Maria Goenaga	Drama, History, Thriller. 1936. A country taken by the fascism. A husband marked for the killing. A wife determined to all for saving him. An endless incarceration in his own home.

== 2020s ==
Year	Country	Main title (Alternative title)	Original title (Original script)	Director	Battles, campaigns, events depicted
2020	Spain	Land of looms	Terra de telers	Joan Frank Charansonnet	Drama.
2021	Spain	The skin of the volcano	La piel del volcán	Armando Ravelo	Drama.
2021	Spain; France; United States	Parallel Mothers	Madres paralelas	Pedro Almodóvar	Drama.
2022	Spain	Flocks	Estols	Xavier Moreno	Drama.
2023	Spain	The Teacher Who Promised the Sea	El maestro que prometió el mar	Patricia Font	Biography, Drama. Based on a novel El mestre que va prometre el mar. Antoni Benaiges
2024	Spain; Portugal	May I Speak with the Enemy?	¿Es el enemigo? La película de Gila	Alexis Morante	Comedy. Based on the book El libro de Gila. Antología cómica de obra y vida. Miguel Gila
2025	Spain	San Simón		Miguel Ángel Delgado	Drama. Concentration camp on the Island of San Simón.
2025	Spain	The Dinner	La cena	Manuel Gómez Pereira	Comedy, Drama, History. Based on the play La cena de los generales.
2025	Spain	Karmele		Asier Altuna	Drama. Based on the novel Elkarrekin esnatzeko ordua.
2026	Spain; Chile; Argentina	Winnipeg, the Seed of Hope	Winnipeg, el barco de la esperanza	Elio Quiroga; Beñat Beitia	Animation, Drama, History. Based on the graphic novel Winnipeg, el barco de la esperanza.
2026	Spain; France	The Black Ball	La bola negra	Javier Calvo; Javier Ambrossi	Drama, History, Musical, Romance, War. Based on the plays La bola negra and La piedra oscura.
2026	Spain		El cielo es para siempre	Ricardo del Pozo	María Teresa Ferragut Roig, Martyrs of the Spanish Civil War, Religious persecution during the Spanish Civil War, Red Terror

== Upcoming films ==
Year	Country	Main title (Alternative title)	Original title (Original script)	Director	Subject
2027	Spain; Belgium	Nightfall	Lorca	Fernando Franco	Biography, Drama. Federico García Lorca
2027	Spain	Brothers Land		Paula Ortiz	Based on the article La Tierra de Nadie.
2027	Spain	In blood and fire	A sangre y fuego	J. A. Bayona	Drama. Based on the novel In blood and fire. Heroes, beasts and martyrs of Spain.

== Science fiction, fantasy, and horror ==
Year	Country	Main title (Alternative titles)	Original title (Original script)	Director	Battles, campaigns, events depicted
2001	Spain; Mexico	The Devil's Backbone	El Espinazo del Diablo	Guillermo del Toro	Drama, Horror, Thriller.
2010	Spain; France	The Last Circus	Balada triste de trompeta	Álex de la Iglesia	Adventure, Comedy, Drama, Horror, Thriller. Son of Republican militiaman carries out his own war over a woman
2012	Spain; France; Portugal	Painless	Insensibles	Juan Carlos Medina	Adventure, Fantasy, Horror, Mystery, Thriller.
2012	Spain	The Forest	El Bosc	Óscar Aibar	Drama, Fantasy, Sci-Fi, War. Story of a family torn apart during the Spanish Civil War in Lower Aragon. The husband takes refuge using a portal to another world. 1936
2020	Spain	Valley of the Dead	Malnazidos	Javier Ruiz Caldera; Alberto de Toro	Action, Adventure, Fantasy, Horror, Thriller, War. Months after bloody combats leave behind thousands of dead in the trenches. Jan Lozano, Captain of the Fifth Brigade has fallen prisoner by an opponent's platoon along with a young driver while carrying out a mission that has been entrusted to him. The possibility of dying executed will soon be overtaken when a new unknown enemy arises. Both rival sides must unite and set their mutual hate aside in order to survive.

== Television films ==
Year	Country	Main title (Alternative title)	Original title (Original script)	Director	Subject
1960	United States	The Fifth Column		John Frankenheimer	Drama.
1965	East Germany; United Kingdom	Four Soldiers	Ballade vom roten Mohn	Kurt Jung-Alsen	Drama, War. International Brigades
1967	Finland	The Death of Federico	Federicon kuolema	Tuija-Maija Niskanen	Drama. Federico García Lorca
1967	France	The Spaniard	L'Espagnol	Jean Prat	Drama. Based on a novel L'Espagnol.
1973	Yugoslavia	Fifth column	Пета колона Peta kolona	Boro Drašković	Drama.
1976	Italy	The assassination of Federico Garcia Lorca	L'assassinio di Federico Garcia Lorca	Alessandro Cane	Drama. Federico García Lorca
1976	United Kingdom	The Madness		James Cellan Jones	(Note: The cast of characters in The Madness, a BBC production, includes the following historical figures: Prieto, Largo Caballero, Dolores Ibárruri, Gen. Queipo de Llano, Andrés Nin, General Mola, Gen. Asensio Torrado, Vicente Uribe, Jesús Hernández Tomás (Education Minister), Garcia Oliver, Giral, Galarza (Interior Minister), Federica Montseny, Alvarez Del Vayo, Juan Negrín, General Miaja, and General Rojo. Generals Queipo de Llano and Mola are Nationalists; the other leaders are all Republicans. The role of Francisco Largo Caballero was played by Patrick Stewart.)
1977	Canada	Bethune		Eric Till	Biography, Drama. Montreal doctor Norman Bethune in Spain, then China for Sino-Japanese War
1986	Spain	The king and the queen	El rey y la reina	José Antonio Páramo	Drama.
2008	Spain	The sailor	A mariñeira	Antón Dobao	Drama.
2012	Spain	The conspiracy	La conspiración	Pedro Olea	Thriller. Spanish coup of July 1936
2012	United States	Hemingway & Gellhorn		Philip Kaufman	Biography, Drama, Romance. Story depicts the occasion that the two journalist met each other in Spain while they were both covering the Spanish Civil War.
2016	Spain	Ebro, from the cradle to the battle	Ebro, de la cuna a la batalla	Roman Parrado	Drama, History. Leva del biberón, Battle of the Ebro
2019	Spain	Exodus, from the battle to the border	Èxode, de la batalla a la frontera	Roman Parrado Lloro	Drama, War.
2021	Spain	The shrapnel	El metralla	Jordi Roigé i Solé	
2021	Spain	Frederica Montseny, the woman who speaks	Frederica Montseny, la dona que parla	Laura Mañá	Biography. Federica Montseny

== Television series ==
Year	Country	Main title (Alternative title)	Original title (Original script)	Director	Subject
1965	United Kingdom	For Whom the Bell Tolls		Rex Tucker	Drama. Based on a novel For Whom the Bell Tolls
1971	East Germany	Clear skies all over Spain	Über ganz Spanien wolkenloser Himmel	Hans Knötzsch	
1980	Poland	Mission	Misja	Paweł Komorowski	Action, Adventure
1984	East Germany	Front without mercy	Front ohne Gnade	Rudi Kurz	War, Drama, Action, Adventure
1985	Spain	Vacationers	Veraneantes	Alberto González Vergel	Drama
1987-8	Spain	Lorca, death of a poet	Lorca, muerte de un poeta	Juan Antonio Bardem	Biography, Drama. Federico García Lorca
1990	Spain	Riders of the Dawn	Los Jinetes del Alba	Vicente Aranda	Drama, War. Based on a novel Los Jinetes del Alba.
1990	Spain	The Forging of a Rebel	La forja de un rebelde	Mario Camus	Biography, Drama, War. Based on the books The Forging of a Rebel. Arturo Barea
1997	Spain	Perez's gang	La banda de Pérez	Ricardo Palacios	Comedy
2001-2	Spain	Time of Silence	Temps de silenci		Drama
2005-15	Spain	Love in troubled times	Amar en tiempos revueltos		Adventure, Drama, Romance, Thriller, War.
2006	Canada	Bethune		Yang Yang	Biography
2008	France; Spain; Belgium	Them and Me	Elles et Moi	Bernard Stora	Drama.
2011	Spain		Tornarem	Felip Solé	Drama, War
2012	Spain	Gernika under the bombs	Gernika bajo las bombas	Luis Marías	Drama. Bombing of Guernica
2013-4	Spain	The Time in Between	El tiempo entre costuras	Ignacio Mercero; Iñaki Peñafiel; Norberto López Amado	Adventure, Drama, History, Mystery, Romance
2017	Portugal; Spain	Vidago Palace		Henrique Oliveira	Drama, History, Romance
2019	Spain		Parany	Juan Luis Iborra	Drama.
2021	United Kingdom	The Pursuit of Love		Emily Mortimer	Drama, Romance
2023	Spain	The Patients of Dr. García	Los pacientes del doctor García	Joan Noguera	Drama.

== See also ==
- List of World War II films
