= Sana Na N'Hada =

Filmmaker from Guinea Bissau (born 1950)

Sana Na N’Hada
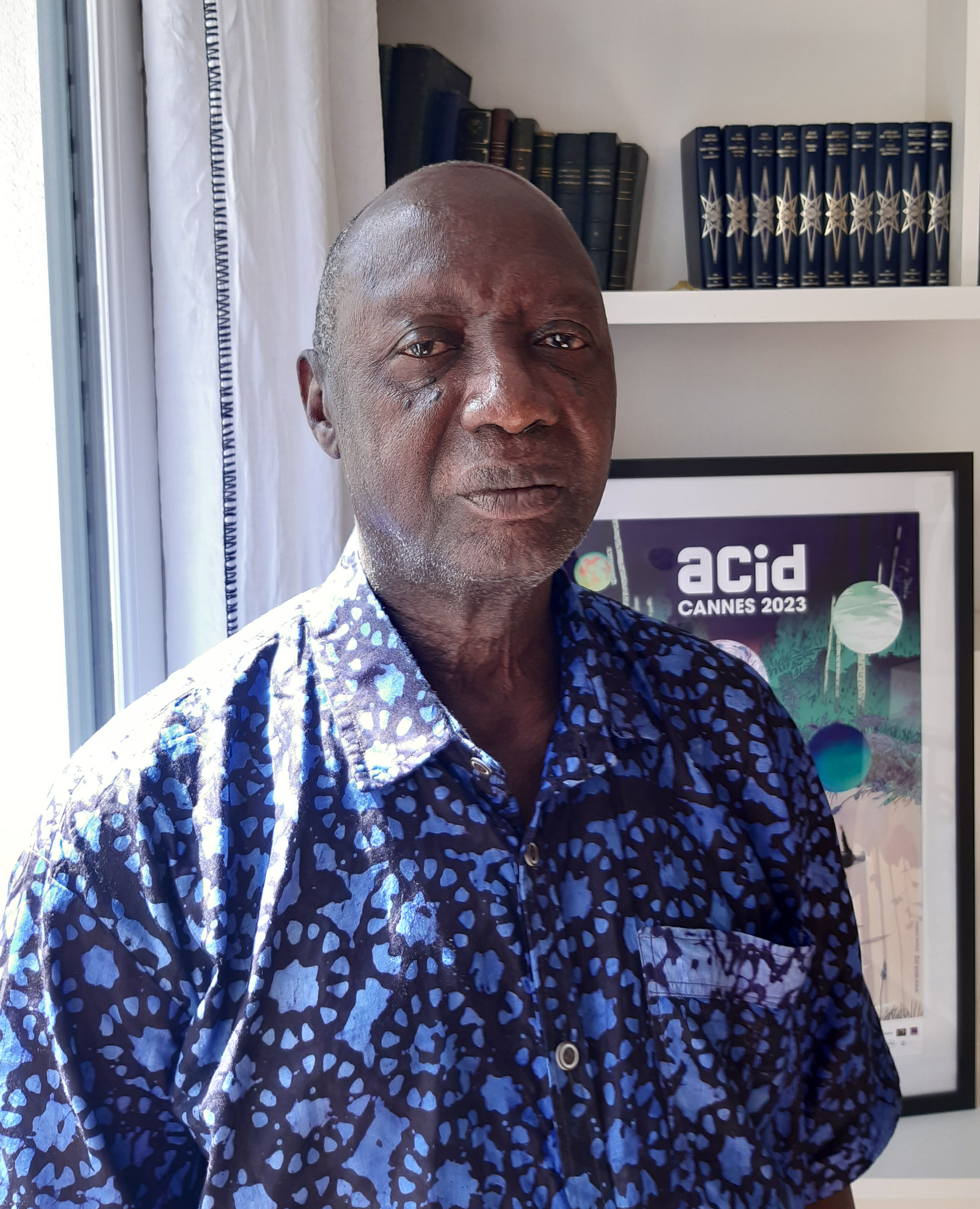
- Sana Na Nhada in 2023
- Born: May 26, 1950 (age 76); Enxalé
- Citizenship: Guinea Bissau
- Education: Institut des hautes études cinématographiques Instituto Cubano del Arte e Industria Cinematográficos
- Occupation: filmmaker
- Notable work: Xime

Sana Na N’Hada (born 1950) is a filmmaker from Guinea Bissau, "the first filmmaker from Guinea-Bissau".

== Life ==
Sana Na N’Hada was born in 1950 in Enxalé. Though his father wanted him to work on the land, he attended a Franciscan primary school for 'indigenous' students and encountered teachers active in the national liberation movement. In the 1960s he joined the guerrillas to work as a medical assistant. In 1967, Amílcar Cabral sent him – together with José Bolama Cubumba, Josefina Lopes Crato and Flora Gomes – to study filmmaking at the Instituto Cubano del Arte e Industria Cinematográficos in Cuba. He later studied at the Institut des hautes études cinématographiques in Paris.

In 1978, Na N’Hada became the first director of the National Film Institute, holding the post until 1989.

Na N’Hada started his own filmmaking with several short films, the first two co-directed with his contemporary Flora Gomes. He collaborated with Chris Marker on Marker's essay-film Sans Soleil (1983), providing Marker with footage of Bissau Carnival. He was also assistant director to Flora Gomes for his first feature film, Mortu Nega [Those Whom Death Refused] (1988), and in Po di sangui [Blood Tree].

His first feature film, Xime (1994) was co-written with Joop van Wijk. Xime was a historical film set in 1962, the year before Guinea Bissau's war of liberation started. It was shown at the Cannes Film Festival. His documentary Bissau d'Isabel (2005) used the daily life of Isabel Nabalí Nhaga, a nurse struggling to support her family, as a microcosm of the city of Bissau. The documentary Kadjike (2013), shot in the Bijagós Islands, juxtaposed the natural beauty of the archipelago, and its traditional understanding in Bijagó myth, to the threat posed by its exploitation by the global drug trafficking trade.

== Films ==
- (co-directed with Flora Gomes) Regresso de Cabral [Return of Cabral], 1976. Short semidocumentary.
- (co-directed with Flora Gomes) Anos no Oça Luta [We Dare to Fight], 1978. Short semidocumentary.
- Xime, 1994. Feature film.
- Bissau d'Isabel [Isabel's Bissau], 2005. Documentary.
- Kadjike [Sacred Bush], 2013
- Os Escultores de Espíritos [The Sculptors of Spirits], 2015
- Nome, 2023
