= List of Greek Civil War films =

Below is an incomplete list of feature films, television films or television series which include events of the Greek Civil War. This list does not include documentaries, short films.

== Films ==
| Year | Country | Main title (Alternative title) | Original title (Original script) | Director | Subject |
|---|---|---|---|---|---|
| 1949 | Yugoslavia | Mother Katina | Majka Katina | Nikola Popović | Drama. |
| 1953 | United States | Guerrilla Girl | | John Christian | Thriller, War, Drama. |
| 1969 | Greece | Fugitives from Bulkes | Δραπέτες του Μπούλκες | Andreas Papastamatakis | Adventure, Drama. Bulkes camp |
| 1971 | Greece | Grammos | Γράμμος | Ilias Mahairas | War. |
| 1971 | Greece | Shake Hands and Make Up | Δώστε τα χέρια | Erricos Andreou | Drama, War. |
| 1971 | Yugoslavia | Black Seed | Црно семе | Kiril Cenevski | Drama. |
| 1972 | Soviet Union | Corner of Arbat and Boumpoulinas | На углу Арбата и улицы Бубулинас; Γωνία Αρμπάτ και Μπουμπουλίνας | Manos Zacharias | Drama. |
| 1975 | Greece | The Travelling Players | Ο Θίασος | Theo Angelopoulos | Drama, History, Music, War. |
| 1977 | Greece; France; West Germany | The Hunters | Οι Κυνηγοί | Theo Angelopoulos | Drama. |
| 1978 | Greece | George Polk | Υπόθεση Πολκ | Angelos Malliaris | Crime. George Polk |
| 1981 | Yugoslavia | The Red Horse | Црвениот коњ | Stole Popov | Drama, History, War. Based on a novel The Red Horse. |
| 1982 | Greece | The Red Train | Το κόκκινο τρένο | Takis Simonetatos | Action, War. |
| 1984 | Greece | Against the Storm (Hunted to Death) | Τα χρόνια της θύελλας | Nikos Tzimas | Adventure, Drama, History, Romance, War. |
| 1984 | Greece | The Descent of the Nine | | Christos Siopahas | Adventure, War. |
| 1985 | Greece | On Course | Εν πλω | Stavros Konstandarakos | Adventure, Drama. |
| 1985 | United States | Eleni | | Peter Yates | Drama, War. Based on the memoir Eleni by Nicholas Gage. |
| 1986 | Greece | Caravan Serai | Καραβάν σαράι | Tasos Psarras | Drama. |
| 1987 | Greece | The Noose | Ο κλοιός | Kostas Koutsomytis | Action, Thriller. |
| 1995 | Greece | Eniochos - The Charioteer | Ηνίοχος | Alexis Damianos | Adventure, Drama, War. |
| 1997 | Greece; Cyprus | Vasiliki | Βασιλική | Vangelis Serdaris | Drama. |
| 1998 | Greece | All of Us, Efendi | Ούλοι εμείς εφέντη | Leonidas Vardaros | Drama, History. |
| 2004 | Greece; France; Italy; Germany | Trilogy: The Weeping Meadow | Τριλογία: Το λιβάδι που δακρύζει | Theo Angelopoulos | Drama, History, Romance. |
| 2009 | Greece; Cyprus | Deep Soul | Ψυχή Βαθιά | Pantelis Voulgaris | Drama, War. |
| 2011 | Greece | Tied Red Thread | Δεμένη κοκκίνη κλωστή | Kostas Haralambous | Drama, War. |

== Television series ==
| Year | Country | Main title (Alternative title) | Original title (Original script) | Director | Subject |
|---|---|---|---|---|---|
| 1983 | Yugoslavia | The Red Horse | Црвениот коњ | Stole Popov | Drama. Based on a novel The Red Horse. |
| 1988 | Greece | Caravan Serai | Καραβάν Σαράι | Tasos Psarras | |
