= List of films about the Armenian genocide =

Below is an incomplete list of feature films, television films or television series which include events of the Armenian genocide. This list does not include documentaries, short films.

== 1910s ==
Year	Country	Main title (Alternative title)	Original title (Original script)	Director	Subject
1919	United States	Ravished Armenia (Auction of Souls)		Oscar Apfel	Drama, History, Romance, War. Based on the book Ravished Armenia.

== 1920s ==
Year	Country	Main title (Alternative title)	Original title (Original script)	Director	Subject
1928	France	Andranik	Անդրանիկ	Acho Chakatouny	War. Andranik

== 1960s ==
Year	Country	Main title (Alternative title)	Original title (Original script)	Director	Subject
1960	Soviet Union	They Are to Live	Рождённые жить Կոչված են ապրելու	Laert Vagharshyan	Drama.

== 1970s ==
Year	Country	Main title (Alternative title)	Original title (Original script)	Director	Subject
1977	Soviet Union	Life Triumphs	Наапет; Նահապետ	Henrik Malyan	Drama. Based on the story Nahapet.

== 1980s ==
Year	Country	Main title (Alternative title)	Original title (Original script)	Director	Subject
1981	Soviet Union	Miron of Dzori	Дзори Миро; Миро в долине Ձորի Միրոն	Zhirayr Avetisyan	Drama. Based on the novel Miron of Dzori.
1982	United States	The Forty Days of Musa Dagh		Sarky Mouradian	Drama, History, War. Based on the novel The Forty Days of Musa Dagh. Musa Dagh
1982	United States; Canada	Assignment Berlin		Hrayr Toukhanian	Drama. Soghomon Tehlirian, Talaat Pasha, Assassination of Talaat Pasha

== 1990s ==
Year	Country	Main title (Alternative title)	Original title (Original script)	Director	Subject
1990	Soviet Union	Yearning	Тоска; Կարոտ	Frunze Dovlatyan	Drama. Based on the novel Yearning.
1991	France	Mother	Mayrig	Henri Verneuil	Drama. Based on the novel Mayrig.
1991	Armenia	Lost Paradise	Կորսված դրախտ Потерянный рай Утерянный рай	David Safarian	Drama.
1992	France	588 rue paradis		Henri Verneuil	Drama. Based on an unknown novel.
1992	Armenia; Germany	Avetik	Ավետիք	Don Askarian	Drama.

== 2000s ==
Year	Country	Main title (Alternative title)	Original title (Original script)	Director	Subject
2001	Poland	The Spring to Come	Przedwiośnie	Filip Bajon	Drama. Based on the novel The Spring to Come.
2001	Armenia; Germany; Netherlands	On the Old Roman Road	Հին հռոմեական ճանապարհին	Don Askarian	Drama, Mystery, Thriller.
2002	Canada; France	Ararat		Atom Egoyan	Drama, War. Defense of Van
2007	Italy; Bulgaria; Spain; France; Germany	The Lark Farm	La masseria delle allodole	Paolo and Vittorio Taviani	Drama, History. Based on the novel Skylark Farm.

== 2010s ==
Year	Country	Main title (Alternative title)	Original title (Original script)	Director	Subject
2014	Germany; France; Italy; Russia; Poland; Canada; Turkey; Jordan	The Cut		Fatih Akin	Adventure, Drama, History, Mystery, War.
2015	United States	1915		Garin Hovannisian; Alec Mouhibian	Drama.
2015	France	Don't Tell Me the Boy Was Mad	Une histoire de fou	Robert Guédiguian	Drama, History. Based on the novel La Bombe. Soghomon Tehlirian, Talaat Pasha, Assassination of Talaat Pasha
2015	Turkey	Lost Birds	Yitik Kuşlar	Ela Alyamaç; Aren Perdeci	Drama.
2015	Armenia	Back to Gurun	Վերադարձ դեպի Գյուրուն	Adrine Grigoryan	
2016	Spain; United States	The Promise		Terry George	Action, Adventure, Drama, War.
2016	United States	Armenia, My Love...	Հայաստա՛ն, իմ սե՛ր	Diana Angelson	Drama.
2019	Armenia	Songs of Solomon	Սողոմոնի երգերը	Arman Nshanian	Drama. Komitas

== Television films ==
Year	Country	Main title (Alternative title)	Original title (Original script)	Director	Subject
1988	Belgium; United Kingdom; West Germany	Komitas	Կոմիտաս	Don Askarian	Biography, Drama. Komitas
2010	France		Azad	Niko Tackian	

== Television series ==
Year	Country	Main title (Alternative title)	Original title (Original script)	Director	Subject
1993	France	Mother	Mayrig	Henri Verneuil	Drama. Based on the novel Mayrig.
2002	Poland	The Spring to Come	Przedwiośnie	Filip Bajon	Drama, History. Based on the novel The Spring to Come.
