= List of the First Indochina War films =

Below is an incomplete list of feature films, television films or television series which include events of the First Indochina War. This list does not include documentaries, short films.

== 1940s ==
Year	Country	Main title (Alternative title)	Original title (Original script)	Director	Subject
1948	United States	Rogues' Regiment		Robert Florey	Action, Adventure, Mystery, Thriller, War.

== 1950s ==
Year	Country	Main title (Alternative title)	Original title (Original script)	Director	Subject
1952	United States	A Yank in Indo-China		Wallace Grissell	Action, Adventure, History, Romance, War.
1955	United States	Jump into Hell		David Butler	Drama, War. Battle of Dien Bien Phu
1955	Poland	The Atlantic Tale	Opowieść atlantycka	Wanda Jakubowska	Drama. Based on a novel Wał atlantycki.
1955	France	Rendez-vous of the Docks	Le Rendez-vous des quais	Paul Carpita	Drama. Strikes of 1949-1950 against the Indochina War
1956	Vietnam	We want to live	Chúng tôi muốn sống	Vĩnh Noãn; Manuel Conde	Drama. Land reform in North Vietnam, Vietnamese boat people, Operation Passage to Freedom.
1957	United States	China Gate		Samuel Fuller	Action, Drama, War.
1957	France	Fugitive in Saigon	Mort en fraude	Marcel Camus	Drama, War. Based on a novel Mort en fraude.
1957	France	The River of Three Junks	La rivière des trois jonques	André Pergament	Adventure. Based on a novel Les Gentlemen de Hong Kong.
1957	France	Shock Patrol	Patrouille de choc	Claude Bernard-Aubert	Drama, War.
1958	United States	The Quiet American		Joseph L. Mankiewicz	Drama, Romance, Thriller, War. Based on a novel The Quiet American.
1958	East Germany	Bat squadron	Geschwader Fledermaus	Erich Engel	Drama, War. Based on the play Geschwader Fledermaus. Civil Air Transport
1958	Czechoslovakia	The Black Battalion	Cerný prapor	Vladimír Čech	Drama.
1959	United States	Five Gates to Hell		James Clavell	Adventure, Drama, War.

== 1960s ==
Year	Country	Main title (Alternative title)	Original title (Original script)	Director	Subject
1961	North Vietnam	A Phu and His Wife	Vợ chồng A Phủ	Mai Lộc; Hoàng Thái	Drama, Romance, War.
1962	North Vietnam	Mrs. Tu Hau	Chị Tư Hậu	Phạm Kỳ Nam; Trần Thiện Liêm	Drama, War. Based on the script Một chuyện chép ở bệnh viện.
1963	France; Italy	Fort du Fou		Léo Joannon	Drama, War.
1964	France; Italy; Spain	Pariahs of Glory	Les Parias de la gloire	Henri Decoin	Drama, War.
1964	North Vietnam	Young Soldier	Người chiến sĩ trẻ	Hải Ninh	Drama, War.
1965	France; Spain	The 317th Platoon	La 317ème section	Pierre Schoendoerffer	War. Based on a novel La 317e section. Battle of Dien Bien Phu
1966	United States	Lost Command		Mark Robson	Action, Drama, War. Based on a novel The Centurions. Battle of Dien Bien Phu
1966	France	The Postman Goes to War	Le facteur s'en va-t-en guerre	Claude Bernard-Aubert	Drama, War. Based on a novel Le facteur s'en va-t-en guerre.

== 1970s ==
Year	Country	Main title (Alternative title)	Original title (Original script)	Director	Subject
1977	France	Drummer-Crab	Le Crabe-tambour	Pierre Schoendoerffer	Adventure, Drama, War. Based on a novel Le Crabe-Tambour. Pierre Guillaume

== 1980s ==
Year	Country	Main title (Alternative title)	Original title (Original script)	Director	Subject
1980	France		Charlie Bravo	Claude Bernard-Aubert	Adventure, War.
1983	Vietnam; France	Dust of Empire	Poussière d'empire	Lam Lê	Drama.
1988	East Germany; Vietnam	Jungle time	Dschungelzeit; Những mảnh đời rừng	Jörg Foth; Trần Vũ	War.

== 1990s ==
Year	Country	Main title (Alternative title)	Original title (Original script)	Director	Subject
1990	Soviet Union; Germany	The Parrot Speaking Yiddish	Попугай, говорящий на идиш	Efraim Sevela	Adventure, Comedy. Based on a novel Mama.
1992	France	Dien Bien Phu	Diên Biên Phu	Pierre Schoendoerffer	Drama, War. Battle of Dien Bien Phu.
1997	Vietnam	Hanoi winter 1946	Hà Nội mùa đông năm 46	Đặng Nhật Minh; Phạm Nhuệ Giang; Nguyễn Hữu Mười; Thái Ninh	Drama. Ho Chi Minh
1998	Algeria; Vietnam	Lotus flower	Fleur de lotus Bông sen	Amar Laskri; Trần Đắc	

== 2000s ==
Year	Country	Main title (Alternative title)	Original title (Original script)	Director	Subject
2002	United Kingdom; Germany; United States; Vietnam; France	The Quiet American		Phillip Noyce	Drama, Romance, Thriller, War. Based on a novel The Quiet American.
2002	United States; France; Germany; United Kingdom	We Were Soldiers		Randall Wallace	Action, Drama, History, War. Battle of Mang Yang Pass, Nguyễn Hữu An
2004	Vietnam	Memories of Dien Bien	Ký ức Điện Biên	Đỗ Minh Tuấn	Drama, Romance, War. Battle of Dien Bien Phu
2006	Vietnam	The White Silk Dress	Áo lụa Hà Đông	Luu Huynh	Drama.

== 2010s ==
Year	Country	Main title (Alternative title)	Original title (Original script)	Director	Subject
2014	Vietnam	Living with history	Sống cùng lịch sử	Nguyễn Thanh Vân	History. Battle of Dien Bien Phu
2017	France	Red Sky	Ciel Rouge	Olivier Lorelle	Drama, War.
2018	France	To the Ends of the World	Les Confins du Monde	Guillaume Nicloux	Drama, War.

== 2020s ==
Year	Country	Main title (Alternative title)	Original title (Original script)	Director	Subject
2023	Vietnam	Peach, Pho and Piano	Đào, phở và piano	Phi Tiến Sơn	Drama, Romance, War. Battle of Hanoi

== Science fiction, fantasy, and horror films ==
Year	Country	Main title (Alternative titles)	Original title (Original script)	Director	Battles, campaigns, events depicted
1988	Poland; Soviet Union	Curse of Snakes Valley	Klątwa doliny węży	Marek Piestrak	Adventure, Sci-Fi, Thriller. Based on a short story The Hobby of Dr. Traven.
2016	Vietnam; South Korea	The Housemaid	Cô Hầu Gái	Derek Nguyen	Horror, Romance.

== Television films ==
Year	Country	Main title (Alternative title)	Original title (Original script)	Director	Subject
2014	France	White Soldier	Soldat blanc	Erick Zonca	Drama, War.

== Television series ==
Year	Country	Main title (Alternative title)	Original title (Original script)	Director	Subject
1994	Vietnam	Red flower	Hoa ban đỏ	Bạch Diệp; Trần Quốc Trọng; Phạm Huyền	Battle of Dien Bien Phu
1996	Vietnam	Live forever with the capital	Sống mãi với thủ đô	Lê Đức Tiến; Nguyễn Thế Vĩnh	Based on a novel Sống mãi với thủ đô and the play Lũy hoa.
1997	Vietnam	Alluvial roads	Những nẻo đường phù sa	Châu Huế; Trần Ngọc Phong	
2006	Vietnam	Under the flag of justice	Dưới cờ đại nghĩa	Nguyễn Tường Phương; Lê Phương Nam	Based on a novel Người Bình Xuyên.
2011	France	Saigon, the summer of our 20s	Saïgon, l'été de nos 20 ans	Philippe Venault	History.
2014	Vietnam	Road to Dien Bien	Đường lên Điện Biên	Bui Tuan Dung	War. Based on a novels Đường lên Tây Bắc, Đại đội trưởng của tôi.
