= Methagu =

2021 film directed by T Kittu

- Release poster
- Directed by: T Kittu
- Written by: Methagu Thiraikkalam Muthu Cheliyan & Thirukumaran
- Starring: Kutti Manni; Lizzie Antony
- Cinematography: Riyaz
- Edited by: CM Elangovan
- Music by: Pradeep Kumar
- Production company: Methagu Thiraikkalam
- Distributed by: BS Value OTT
- Release date: 25 June 2021
- Country: India
- Language: Tamil
- Budget: ₹60 lakh

Methagu (transl. His Excellency) is a 2021 Indian Tamil-language political thriller film based on the life of Velupillai Prabhakaran. The release of the film was postponed several times due to legal issues, but finally had the digital release through OTT platform 'BS Value' on 25 June 2021 with positive response.

The film is based on the early years of Velupillai Prabhakaran and the events in the life of Prabhakaran and his vision.

== Cast ==
- Kutti Manni as Velupillai Prabhakaran
- Eeshwar Baasha
- Vinod Sagar as Constable #455
- Lizzie Antony as Sirimavo Bandaranaike
- Rindhu Ravi as Vallipuram Parvathy
- Rajasekar
- Raja
- Anand
- Vijay Soundar
- Rajavel Perumal as a street theatre artist
- Velupillai as Raja
- Mayor Duraiyappa as Aranganathan

== Production ==
Methagu and Methagu 2 movies were plotted, created and produced by Methagu Thiraikkalam LLP which was managed by Thanjai C.Kumar and Denmark Sumesh Kumar with the help of well known Tamil poet Mr.Thirukumaran from Ireland and Mr. Muthu Cheliyan. T.Kittu's screenplay based on Velupillai Prabhakaran's early life was bankrolled by World Tamils for Tamil Eelazha Thiraikkalam was made in a limited budget of ₹60 lakh (equivalent to ₹77 lakh or US$82,000 in 2026). Actor Kutti Manni was signed to play Prabhakaran, while Lizzie Antony played Sirimavo Bandaranaike, the former Prime Minister of Sri Lanka. Praveen Kumar and Ilanko were signed as composer and editor respectively, with Riyaz cranking the camera.

== Release ==
The film was expected to release on 26 November 2020, but due to the COVID-19 pandemic, it was postponed and finally it was released on 25 June 2021, through OTT platform 'BS Value'. The trailer to the film was released on 20 October, revealing it as a bio-pic of slain leader of the Liberation Tigers of Tamil Eelam (LTTE) and his supporters worldwide trended a Tamil hashtag #Methagu on Twitter. Film personalities Sathyaraj, Vetrimaaran, G. V. Prakash Kumar, Naveen and M. Sasikumar supported the film through their Twitter social media handle.

== Reception ==
A critic from Ananda Vikatan praised the film as a commendable effort, because it portrayed the transparent life of a freedom fighter, even though the film lacks the necessary budget. Film critic Baradwaj Rangan wrote that with all its faults, this is an important biopic about a very crucial figure not only in Sri Lankan politics, but also in Tamil Nadu politics. S.S.Lenin from Hindu Tamil Thisai wrote that even though the film lacks the budget, it portrayed the pain and life of Tamil Eelam people impactfully. Nasikethan of Dinamani wrote that the film has been enjoyed by people because, it portrayed truth.

== Sequel ==
Methagu 2 was released on 19 August 2022 on the OTT platform tamilsott.com.
