= List of Soviet–Afghan War films =

Below is an incomplete list of feature films, television films or television series which include events of the Soviet–Afghan War. This list does not include documentaries, short films.

== 1980s ==
Year	Country	Main title (Alternative title)	Original title (Original script)	Director	Subject
1983	Afghanistan; Soviet Union	Hot Summer in Kabul	Жаркое лето в Кабуле	Ali Hamroyev; Wali Latifi	Action, Drama, War.
1985	United States	Spies Like Us		John Landis	Adventure, Comedy.
1986	Soviet Union	The person who did the interview	Человек, который брал интервью	Yuri Marukhin	Mystery, Thriller. Aleksandr Kaverznev
1986	Switzerland; Pakistan; United Kingdom	The Tragedy of the Afghan	پشتو - غم افغان; Le deuil de l'Afghan; Die Trauer der Afghanen; Ghame Afghan	Mark Rissi; Zmarai Kasi	Drama, War.
1986	Italy	Days of Hell	I giorni dell'inferno	Tonino Ricci	Action, War.
1987	Soviet Union	Through the Grass Barefoot	По траве босиком	Anton Vasilev	Musical.
1987	United Kingdom	The Living Daylights		John Glen	Action, Adventure, Thriller. Based on a short story Octopussy and The Living Daylights.
1988	Soviet Union	Shuravi	Шурави	Sergey Nilov	Drama, War. Based on a novel Gray-haired soldier.
1988	United States	The Beast		Kevin Reynolds	Adventure, Drama, War. Based on the play Nənawā́te.
1988	United States	Rambo III		Peter MacDonald	Action, Adventure, Thriller.
1989	Soviet Union	Cargo 300	Груз 300	Georgiy Kuznetsov	Drama, War.
1989	Italy; United States	Afganistan - The Last War Bus	L'ultimo bus di guerra	Pierluigi Ciriaci	Action, War.
1989	Soviet Union	Scorched by Kandahar	Опалённые Кандагаром	Yuri Sabitov	Action.
1989	Soviet Union	Lucky	Счастливчик	Valentin Mishatkin	

== 1990s ==
Year	Country	Main title (Alternative title)	Original title (Original script)	Director	Subject
1990	Soviet Union	Sabotage	Təxribat; Диверсия	Eldar Quliyev	Drama.
1990	Soviet Union	Nautilus	Наутилус	Vladimir Shamshurin	Drama.
1991	Soviet Union	Two steps to silence	Два шага до тишины	Yuri Tupitsky	Drama, War.
1991	Soviet Union	Gorge of Spirits	Ущелье духов	Sergey Nilov	Action.
1991	Soviet Union	Caravan of Death	Караван смерти	Ivan Solovov	Action.
1991	Soviet Union	Afghan	Афганец	Vladimir Mazur	Action.
1991	Russia; Italy	Afghan Breakdown	Афганский излом	Vladimir Bortko	War.
1991	Russia	Leg	Нога	Nikita Tyagunov	Action, Drama, War. Based on a novel The Leg.
1992	Ukraine	American boy	Америкэн бой	Boris Kvashnev	Action, Thriller.
1992	Russia; Syria	Destroy the Thirtieth!	Тридцатого уничтожить!	Viktor Dotsenko	Action. Based on a novel Destroy the Thirtieth!
1993	Russia	Black Shark	Чёрная акула	Vitaliy Lukin	Action. Kamov Ka-50
1993	Turkmenistan	Ohlamon	Охламон	Eduard Redzhepov	Drama.
1994	Ukraine	Afghan 2	Афганец 2	Vladimir Mazur	Action.
1994	Russia	Peshavar Waltz	Пешаварский вальс	Timur Bekmambetov; Gennadiy Kayumov	War. Badaber uprising
1995	Russia	A Moslem	Мусульманин	Vladimir Khotinenko	Drama.
1997	Moldova	Ricochet	Рикошет	Igor Talpa	Action.
1997	Moldova; Bulgaria; Russia	Deserter	Дезертир	Yuriy Muzyka	Drama.

== 2000s ==
Year	Country	Main title (Alternative title)	Original title (Original script)	Director	Subject
2004	Afghanistan; France	Earth and Ashes	خاکستر و خاک	Atiq Rahimi	Drama. Based on a novel Earth and Ashes.
2005	Russia; Ukraine; Finland	The 9th Company	9 рота	Fyodor Bondarchuk	Action, Drama, History, War. Battle for Hill 3234
2006	France; Germany; Afghanistan	The Soldier's Star	L'étoile du soldat	Christophe de Ponfilly	Drama, History, War.
2007	Russia	Cargo 200	Груз 200	Aleksei Balabanov	Crime, Drama, Thriller.
2007	United States; Germany	Charlie Wilson's War		Mike Nichols	Biography, Comedy, Drama, History. Based on the book Charlie Wilson's War: The Extraordinary Story of the Largest Covert Operation in History. Charlie Wilson, Gust Avrakotos, Operation Cyclone
2007	United Kingdom; China; United States	The Kite Runner		Marc Forster	Drama. Based on a novel The Kite Runner.
2008	Russia	I'm standing on the edge	На краю стою	Edward Topol; Munid Zakirov; Rauf Kubayev	Action, Drama.

== 2010s ==
Year	Country	Main title (Alternative title)	Original title (Original script)	Director	Subject
2010	Russia	The Afghan Caravan	Белый песок	Andres Puustusmaa; Murad Aliev	Action.
2011	Kazakhstan; Russia	Returning to the 'A'	Возвращение в «А»	Egor Konchalovsky	Drama, War.
2012	Uzbekistan	Afg'on	Немой Дом; Афгон	Yalkin Tuychiev	Drama.
2016	Uzbekistan	Autumn details	Xazonrezgi; Подробности осени	Zulfiqor Musoqov	Comedy, Romance.
2019	Russia	Leaving Afghanistan	Братство	Pavel Lungin	Action, Drama, War.

== 2020s ==
Year	Country	Main title (Alternative title)	Original title (Original script)	Director	Subject
2022	Russia	Immortals	Бессмертные	Tigran Keosayan	Drama.

== Television films ==
Year	Country	Main title (Alternative title)	Original title (Original script)	Director	Subject
1988	Soviet Union	White Crows	Белые вороны	Vladimir Lyubomudrov	Drama.
1988	Soviet Union	Don't Forget to Look Back	Не забудь оглянуться	Aleksandr Voropaev	Romance.

== Television series ==
Year	Country	Main title (Alternative title)	Original title (Original script)	Director	Subject
1988	Soviet Union	All Costs Paid	За всё заплачено	Alexey Saltykov	Drama. Based on a novel All Costs Paid.
2002-8	Russia	Two destinies	Две судьбы	Vladimir Krasnopolsky; Valeriy Uskov	Drama.
2004	Russia; Kazakhstan	Gentlemen officers	Господа офицеры	Andrei Kravchuk	Action, Adventure, Drama.
2004	Russia	Sarmat	Сармат	Igor Talpa	Action.
2006	Russia	Officers	Офицеры	Murad Aliev	Drama.
2008	Russia	The Afghan Ghost	Афганский призрак	Oleg Fomin; Pavel Malkov	Action, Crime, Drama, War.
2010	Russia	Caravan Hunters	Охотники за караванами	Sergey Chekalov	Drama, War.
2013-18	United States	The Americans			Crime, Drama, Mystery, Thriller.
2018	Russia	The Fortress in Badaber	Крепость Бадабер	Kirill Belevich	Drama, War. Badaber uprising
2018	Russia	Blackout	Ненастье	Sergei Ursuliak	Drama.
2018	Russia	Operation Muhabbat	Операция «Мухаббат»	Oleg Fomin	Crime.
2019	Kazakhstan	Kebenek	Кебенек; Рожденный в рубашке	Sanzhar Omarov	
2022	United States	The Old Man			Action, Drama, Thriller. Based on a novel The Old Man.
2024	Russia	Return at any cost	Вернуть любой ценой	Timur Alpatov	Drama, History, War. Based on a novel PPZH. Field wife.
