= Methagu 2 =

2022 film directed by RaaKo. Yoagandran

- Release poster
- Directed by: RaaKo. Yoagandran
- Written by: Methagu Thiraikkalam
- Starring: Gowrishankar; Nassar; Karthik; Yoagandran
- Cinematography: Vinoth Rajendran
- Edited by: Aaditiya
- Music by: Praveen Kumar
- Production company: Methagu Thiraikkalam
- Release date: 19 August 2022
- Country: India
- Language: Tamil

Methagu 2 (transl. His Excellency 2) is a 2022 Indian Tamil-language political thriller film based on the life of Velupillai Prabhakaran. The film is a sequel to Methagu (2021), and was released on an OTT platform on 19 August 2022.

== Cast ==
- Gowrishankar as Velupillai Prabhakaran
- Karthik as Seelan [Charles Anthony]
- Yoagandran as [Ponnamman]
- Nassar as the narrator

== Production ==
Prior to the release of the film, Yoagandran received an offer to make his second Tamil film, which would feature Rakshan in the lead role.

== Release ==
Methagu 2 was released on 19 August 2022 on the OTT platform tamilsott.com. Kalki of Tamil Guardian noted "despite its flaws, Methagu 2 is an important film in archiving the history of man who grew to be the leader of both the Tamil Tigers and of a movement that continues to have significant impact on the Tamil homeland and around the world".
