= Xime =

1994 film by Sana Na N'Hada

- Directed by: Sana Na N'Hada
- Written by: Sana Na N'Hada; Joop van Wijk
- Produced by: Joop van Wijk Jacques Bidou; Jean-Pierre Gallepe Hillie Molenaar
- Starring: Aful Macka Justino Neto José Tamba
- Cinematography: Melle van Essen
- Edited by: Anita Fernández
- Music by: Malam Mane; Patricio Wang
- Release date: 1994
- Running time: 95 minutes
- Country: Guinea-Bissau
- Language: English

Xime is a 1994 Bissau-Guinean drama film directed by Sana Na N'Hada.

== Plot ==
In the early 1960s, in the village of Xime in Guinea-Bissau, Iala, the father of Raul and Bedan, is worried about his two sons. The eldest, Raul, animated by desires of revolt, has joined the liberation movement, unknown to anyone. He is wanted by the Portuguese colonial authorities while he studies at a seminary in Bissau. Bedan, the younger of the two, a turbulent young man still a teenager, is almost at the age where he must reluctantly submit to the traditional coming-of-age rituals. One of these is dressing in women's clothing. Bedan is also admiring his father's young fiancé. In the end, Raul is fatally wounded and stumbles to the wedding, and Bedan joins the revolutionary cause.

== Cast ==
- Aful Macka : Iala
- Justino Neto : Raul
- José Tamba : Bedan
- Etelvina Gomes : N'dai
- Juan Carlos Tajes : Cunha
- Jacqueline Camara
- Saene Nanque
- Namba Na Nfadan

== Production ==
This was only the fourth film to be produced in Guinea-Bissau. It was a French-Dutch co-production. It was the first film to be directed by Sana Na N'Hada, although he collaborated on several short films with Flora Gomes. It was a semi-autobiographical work, and he returned to Guinea-Bissau to film it after studying in Cuba.

== Release and reception ==
Xime was screened at the Cannes Film Festival, in the Un Certain Regard category. It received the Special Jury Prize at the Festival international du film d'Amiens. Xime also received the Special Jury Prize at the Festival International du Premier Film D'Annonay. The film was awarded the Intercultural Communication Prize for a Feature Film at the 1995 Vues d'Afrique festival in Montreal.

Deborah Young of Variety.com was very praiseful of the film. She wrote that it "interests not only for its rare locale but for a fresh approach to historical storytelling" from N'Hada, while the "film's intentions are ambitious, and its black characters are interestingly three-dimensional."
