= List of films about the Russo-Japanese War =

Below is an incomplete list of feature films, television films or television series which include events of the Russo-Japanese War. This list does not include documentaries, short films.

== Films ==
Year	Country	Main title (Alternative title)	Original title (Original script)	Director	Subject
1923	France	The Battle	La Bataille	Sessue Hayakawa; Édouard-Émile Violet	
1930	Japan	Utter Victory	撃滅	Meihô Ogasawara	Battle of Tsushima
1934	United Kingdom; France	The Battle		Nicolas Farkas	Drama, Romance, War.
1936	France; Czechoslovakia; Nazi Germany	Port Arthur	Port-Arthur	Nicolas Farkas	Drama, War. Siege of Port Arthur
1943	United States	Jack London		Alfred Santell	Adventure, Biography, War. Based on The Book of Jack London.
1946	Soviet Union	Cruiser 'Varyag'	Крейсер «Варяг»	Viktor Eisymont	Drama, War. Russian cruiser Varyag (1899), Russian gunboat Korietz, Battle of Chemulpo Bay
1957	Japan	Emperor Meiji and the Great Russo-Japanese War	明治天皇と日露大戦争	Kunio Watanabe	Drama, History, War.
1957	Japan	Advance Patrol	日露戦争勝利の秘史 敵中横断三百里	Kazuo Mori	Action, Adventure, War. Based on the novel Crossing 300 miles through enemy territory.
1959	Japan	Emperor Meiji and General Nogi	明治大帝と乃木将軍	Kiyoshi Komori	Biography, Drama, History, War. Nogi Maresuke, Siege of Port Arthur
1964	Japan	The Life of the Great Emperor Meiji	明治大帝御一代記	Mitsugu Ôkura	
1965	Japan	The Wife of Seisaku	清作の妻	Yasuzō Masumura	Drama, Romance. Based on the novel The Wife of Seisaku.
1969	Japan	Battle of the Japan Sea	日本海大海戦	Seiji Maruyama	Drama, History, War. Siege of Port Arthur, Battle of Tsushima
1980	Japan	The Battle of Port Arthur	二百三高地	Toshio Masuda	Drama, History, War. Nogi Maresuke, Hill 203, Siege of Port Arthur
1983	Japan	Battle Anthem	日本海大海戦 海ゆかば	Toshio Masuda	Drama, War. Japanese battleship Mikasa
1990	Soviet Union; North Korea	The Shore of Salvation	Берег спасения 구원의 기슭	Arya Dashiyev; Ryu Ho Son	Drama, War.
2017	Russia	Anna Karenina: Vronsky's Story	Анна Каренина. История Вронского	Karen Shakhnazarov	Drama. Based on the novel Anna Karenina, the publicistic story During the Japanese War, the literary cycle Stories about the Japanese War.
2019	Japan; Russia	The Prisoner of Sakura	ソローキンの見た桜; В плену у сакуры	Masaki Inoue	Drama, History, Romance, War. Based on the radio drama Matsuyama Prisoner of War Camp Side Story ~ Sorokin's Cherry Blossoms.

== Television films ==
Year	Country	Main title (Alternative title)	Original title (Original script)	Director	Subject
1977	Japan	The sea is reborn	海は甦える	Tsutomu Konno	Based on the novel The sea will be reborn.

== Television series ==
Year	Country	Main title (Alternative title)	Original title (Original script)	Director	Subject
1981	Japan	Portsmouth flag	ポーツマスの旗	Katsushi Nakamura; Minoru Fuse	Based on the novel Portsmouth flag. Komura Jutarō, Treaty of Portsmouth
1981	Japan	The Battle of Port Arthur: Will Love Die?	二百三高地 愛は死にますか		Nogi Maresuke, Hill 203, Siege of Port Arthur
2003	Japan	Lime-iro Senkitan	らいむいろ戦奇譚	Iku Suzuki	Animation, Romance. Based on the game Lime-iro Senkitan.
2005	Japan	Lime-iro Ryûkitan X Cross: Koi, Oshiete Kudasai	テレビアニメ版（流奇譚X）	Tsuneo Tominaga	Animation, Drama, History. Based on the game Lime-iro Senkitan.
2009-11	Japan	Clouds Over the Hills	坂の上の雲	Takeshi Shibata; Mikio Satō; Taku Katō	Drama, History. Based on the novel Saka no Ue no Kumo. Akiyama Saneyuki, Akiyama Yoshifuru
2013	Italy; France; Spain; Lithuania		Anna Karenina	Christian Duguay	Drama. Based on the novel Anna Karenina.
2017	Russia	Anna Karenina	Анна Каренина	Karen Shakhnazarov	Drama. Based on the novel Anna Karenina, the publicistic story During the Japanese War, the literary cycle Stories about the Japanese War.
2018-now	Japan	Golden Kamuy	ゴールデンカムイ		Animation, Action, Adventure, Comedy, History, Western. Based on the manga Golden Kamuy.
