= Venthu Thaninthathu Kaadu =

2021 Sri Lankan Tamil-language war film directed by Mathi Sutha

Venthu Thaninthathu Kaadu (Dark Days of Heaven) is a 2021 Sri Lankan Tamil-language war drama film written and directed by Mathi Sutha on his feature film directorial debut. The storyline of the film revolves around how a single mother is being left abandoned during the Sri Lankan Civil War and explores about the traumatic life challenges and upheavals faced by women during the escalation of the catastrophic war situations. The film was initially banned in Sri Lanka due to the storyline related to Eelam War and the film which was supposed to have its theatrical release in April 2023 and had been indefinitely postponed following a guideline issued by National Film Corporation of Sri Lanka, restraining the film release in Sri Lanka. The ban on the film was later reverted by the National Film Corporation of Sri Lanka and the film was released in theatres across Sri Lanka in May 2024. The film was also premiered at international film festivals and opened to positive reviews, with direction, cast member performance, and screenplay being praised, while the usage of camera angles and narrative arcs to document the war situations were criticized.

== Production ==
The film was predominantly shot using an Apple iPhone. The principal photography of the film began with an allocation of relatively low budget and the film production was financed by a crowdfunding campaign. The filmmakers roped in survivors of the last phase of the civil war as the main cast actors for the film instead of opting for professional actors. The storyline of the film was developed in the backdrop of early 2009, before marking the culminating stages for the end of the 26 year long civil war. The storyline was developed with an opening of the Sri Lankan military making inroads and advancement to capture the Vanni stronghold which was under the firm control of the Liberation Tigers of Tamil Eelam.

The title Venthu Thaninthathu Kaadu was used by Mathi Sutha, and coincidentally, a film project was bankrolled under the same name during the same time frame by Indian film director Gautham Vasudev Menon, as the latter went ahead with the title by casting Silambarasan in the lead role. Mathi Sutha reportedly had telephone conversations with Gautam Vasudev Menon regarding the title selection and both of them had smooth negotiations, having compromised on the title usage.

== Accolades ==
In October 2021, the film was adjudged as the Best International Feature Film as part of the Special Jury Award segment at the Golden Sparrow International Film Festival. The film director Mathi Sutha was recognised as the best debut filmmaker at the 2021 Golden Sparrow International Film Festival. In November 2021, the film received the award for Best Original Screenplay at the Auber Film Festival.

Actress Parvathy Sivapatham was adjudged as the best supporting actress at the 2021 International Film Festival of Andaman and Nicobar. She was conferred with a certificate of achievement in recognition of her performance in the film during the International Film Festival of Andaman and Nicobar. The film was shortlisted by the Australian SF3 during the final round of its competition.
