= Alexander (2008 film) =

- Directed by: Igor Kalyonov
- Written by: Sergey Gerasimov; Yuri Kavtaradze
- Based on: Life of Alexander Nevsky
- Produced by: Rustam Ibragimbekov
- Starring: Svetlana Bakulina; Igor Botvin; Bohdan Stupka
- Music by: Andrey Antonenko
- Production company: Revolver Entertainment
- Release date: 1 May 2008
- Running time: 110 minutes
- Country: Russia
- Language: Russian

Alexander (Russian: Александр. Невская битва, romanized: Aleksandr. Nevskaya bitva) is a 2008 Russian historical action film about Alexander Nevsky directed by Igor Kalyonov.

== Plot ==
The film starts with Nevsky's wedding which involves an attempt of poisoning by his former friend Ratmir. Yashka, a jester at the wedding, tried to warn him but was dragged away and was put under a table by Nevsky's guards. Desperate to serve his leader as a savior, not only as a fool, Yashka comes out from under the table and drinks from Nevsky's cup in which suspected poison was placed. After the attempt, Ratmir escapes the ceremony and gallops away on a horse. After the ceremony, Alexander orders to find him, because he suspects that Ratmir was plotting his assassination on the orders of the Swedes who were approaching Novgorod at that time. Meantime, the Boyars and Mongols are besieging the city as well. Alexander then goes underground where he finds Boyars and kill their leader.

== Cast ==
- Anton Pampushnyy as Alexander Nevsky
- Svetlana Bakulina as Alexandra Nevskaya
- Igor Botvin as Ratmir
- Bohdan Stupka as Yaroslav
- Dmitriy Bykovskiy-Romashov as Birger Jarl
- Andrey Fedortsov as Kornily
- Yuliya Galkina as Daria
- Valeriy Kukhareshin as Eric XI
- Sergey Lysov as Misha
- Aleksandr Orlovskiy
- Valentin Zakharov as Savva
- Semyon Mendelson as Yakov
- Denis Shvedov as Sbyslav Yakunovich
- Pavel Trubiner as Dmitry
- Artur Vaha as head of Boyars
- Artyom Leschik as Ulf Fasi
- Yuriy Tarasov as jester of Eric XI
- Evgeniy Kapitonov as Roman Kulik
- Roman Litvinov as Alexey Batkov

== Reception ==
Alexander received negative reviews in the West in general, but the Russian site RusKino said that such films are important for Russia and its people since the Russian youth don't get much education about history from its teachers.
