= List of films about the Spanish Maquis =

Below is an incomplete list of feature films, television films or television series which include of the Spanish Maquis. This list does not include documentaries, short films.

== Films ==
Year	Country	Main title (Alternative title)	Original title (Original script)	Director	Battles, campaigns, events depicted
1955	Italy; Spain	The Lost City	La ciudad perdida Terroristi a Madrid	Margarita Alexandre; Rafael María Torrecilla	Drama.
1956	Spain		Torrepartida	Pedro Lazaga	Drama, War.
1960	Spain	Peace Never Comes	La paz empieza nunca	León Klimovsky	Drama. Based on a novel La paz empieza nunca.
1964	Spain	Clean Shoot	A tiro limpio	Francisco Pérez-Dolz	Crime.
1964	United States	Behold a Pale Horse		Fred Zinnemann	Drama, War. Based on a novel Killing a mouse on Sunday. Francesc Sabaté
1975	Spain	Pim, pam, pum... fire!	Pim, pam, pum... ¡fuego!	Pedro Olea	Drama.
1978	Spain; Argentina	The days of the past	Los días del pasado	Mario Camus	Drama.
1979	Spain	Heart of the Forest	El corazón del bosque	Manuel Gutiérrez Aragón	Drama.
1987	Spain	Wolves' Moon	Luna de lobos	Julio Sánchez Valdés	Drama, War.
1993	Spain	Fled	Huidos	Sancho Gracia	Drama, War.
1999	Spain	Land of canyons	Tierra de cañones	Antoni Ribas	Drama, History, Romance.
2000	Spain	The Goalkeeper	El portero	Gonzalo Suárez	Drama, Sport.
2001	Spain	Broken Silence	Silencio roto	Montxo Armendáriz	Adventure, Drama, Thriller, War.
2002	Spain; France; United Kingdom	The Shanghai Spell	El embrujo de Shanghai	Fernando Trueba	Drama, Mystery.
2004	Spain; France; Italy	The Year of the Flood	El año del diluvio	Jaime Chávarri	Drama.
2010	Spain	Burnt face	Caracremada	Lluís Galter	Drama, History. Ramon Vila Capdevila
2011	Spain	The Sleeping Voice	La voz dormida	Benito Zambrano	Drama, War.
2019	Spain	The Silent War	Sordo	Alfonso Cortés-Cavanillas	Action, Drama. Invasion of Val d'Aran
2020	Spain	Maquis		Rubén Burén	Drama.
2024	Spain; France	We Treat Women Too Well	Tratamos demasiado bien a las mujeres	Clara Bilbao	Comedy, Drama. Based on a novel On est toujours trop bon avec les femmes.
2025	Spain	The Bad Names	Els Mals Noms	Marc Ortiz Prades	Florencio Pla Meseguer

== Science fiction, fantasy, and horror ==
Year	Country	Main title (Alternative title)	Original title (Original script)	Director	Battles, campaigns, events depicted
2006	Spain; Mexico	Pan's Labyrinth	El laberinto del fauno	Guillermo del Toro	Drama, Fantasy, War. Parable influenced by fairy tale of young girl's escape into abandoned labyrinth with mysterious faun creature in Francoist Spain, May–June 1944

== Television films ==
Year	Country	Main title (Alternative title)	Original title (Original script)	Director	Battles, campaigns, events depicted
2022	Spain	Quico Sabaté: no destiny	Quico Sabaté: sense destí	Sílvia Quer	Biography. Francesc Sabaté

== Television series ==
Year	Country	Main title (Alternative title)	Original title (Original script)	Director	Battles, campaigns, events depicted
1989	Spain	The world of Juan Lobon	El mundo de Juan Lobón	Enrique Brasó	Drama.
1993	Spain	One day I will return	Un día volveré	Francesc Betriu	Drama. Based on a novel Un día volveré.
2009	Spain	The voices of Pamano	Les veus del Pamano	Lluís Maria Güell	Drama. Based on a novel Les veus del Pamano.
2025	Spain		Norats	Toni Bestard; Ferran Bex	Mystery. Jaume Trias Grau
