= Pierre Schoendoerffer, the Sentinel of Memory =

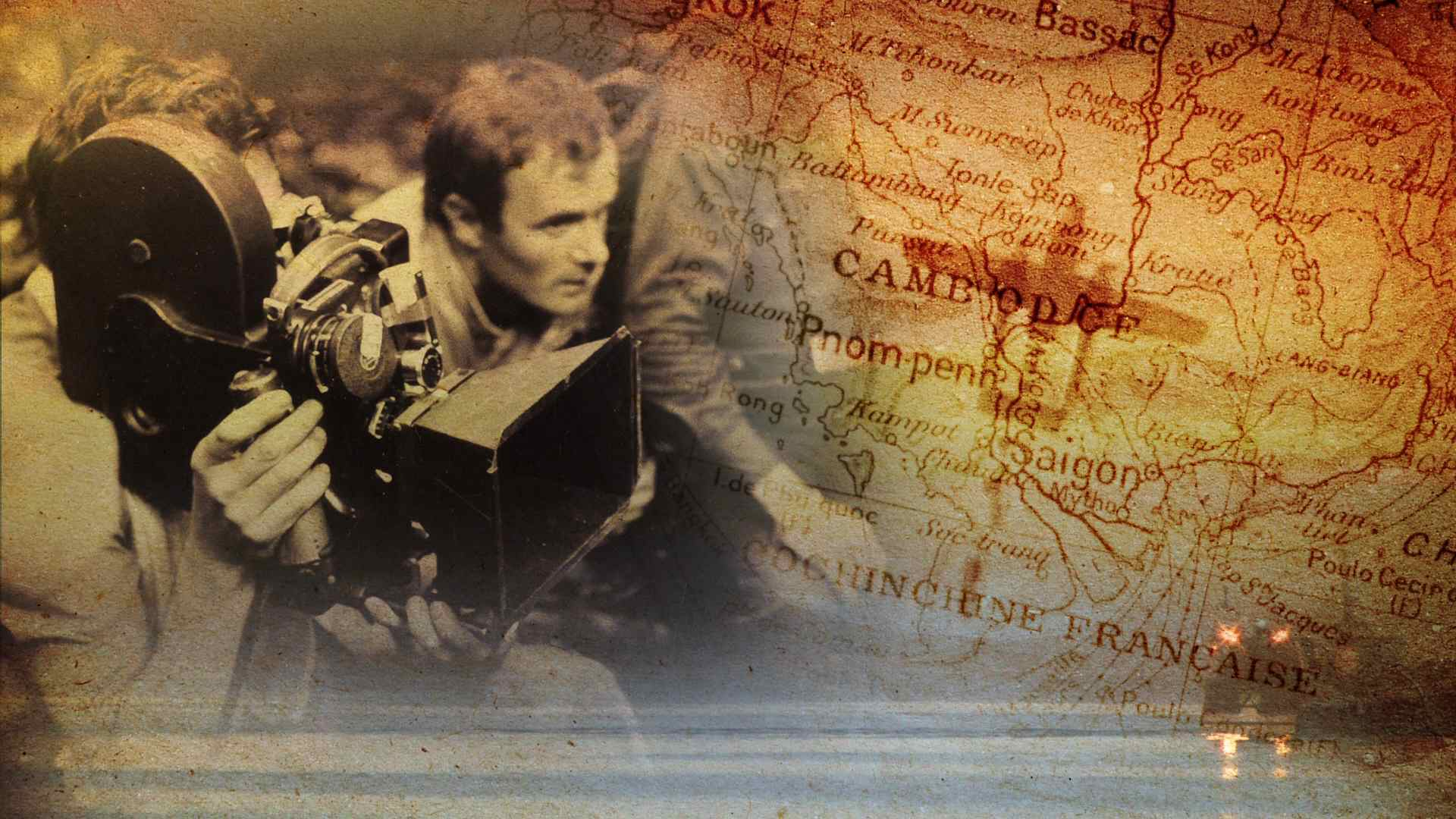
- French: Pierre Schoendoerffer, la sentinelle de la mémoire
- Directed by: Raphaël Millet
- Written by: Raphaël Millet; Olivier Bohler
- Produced by: Olivier Bohler; Nocturnes Productions
- Starring: Pierre Schoendoerffer; Constantin Costa-Gavras; Raoul Coutard; Jacques Perrin
- Cinematography: Julien Selleron
- Edited by: Nicolas Dupouy; Raphaël Millet
- Music by: Marcel Heijnen; Teo Wei Yong
- Release date: October 2011
- Running time: 60 minutes
- Country: France
- Language: French

Pierre Schoendoerffer, the Sentinel of Memory (French: Pierre Schoendoerffer, la sentinelle de la mémoire) is a 2011 feature length documentary film about French writer and filmmaker Pierre Schoendoerffer, directed by Raphaël Millet and produced by Olivier Bohler for Nocturnes Productions.

== Synopsis ==
Pierre Schoendoerffer revisits his life and career, with a strong focus on the impact that his experience as a war cinematographer for the French army during the Indochina War had on him, as well as a war reporter during the Vietnam War when he filmed his 1967 Academy Award-winning documentary The Anderson Platoon named after the leader of the platoon - Lieutenant Joseph B. Anderson - with which Schoendoerffer and his crew were embedded.

== Production ==
Pierre Schoendoerffer, the Sentinel of Memory is a co-production between Nocturnes Productions and the Institut national de l'audiovisuel (INA, the French National Institute for Audiovisual). It has been funded by the National Center of Cinematography and the moving image, with the support of the French Ministry of Defence, French pay-TV Orange Cinéma Séries, and Belgian public broadcaster RTBF.

== Festival screenings and broadcasts ==
Pierre Schoendoerffer, the Sentinel of Memory had its world premiere at Les Rendez-vous de l'histoire, Blois, October 2011. It was screened at the Académie des Beaux-Arts in Paris, France, as a tribute to Pierre Schoendoerffer, in March 2012, and then at Fnac on 16 May 2012. The film was broadcast in France on OCS (television) and Histoire, and in Belgium on RTBF. It is available in VOD on the website of Institut national de l'audiovisuel.

== Cast ==
- Pierre Schoendoerffer
- Raoul Coutard
- Constantin Costa-Gavras
- Jacques Perrin
- Dominique Merlin
- Boramy Tioulong
- Pedro Nguyen
- Pierre Gabaston
