= La 317e section =

La 317e section may refer to:

- La 317e section (novel), a 1963 novel by Pierre Schoendoerffer
- The 317th Platoon (French: La 317ème section), a 1965 French war film, based on the novel
