= Objectif 500 millions =

1966 film

- Directed by: Pierre Schoendoerffer
- Written by: Pierre Schoendoerffer (scenario and dialogue); Jorge Semprún (collaboration)
- Based on: Albert Conroy (novel) (as Martin Albert)
- Produced by: Gérard Beytout; Georges de Beauregard; René Pignières
- Starring: Bruno Cremer; Marisa Mell
- Cinematography: Alain Levent
- Edited by: Armand Psenny
- Music by: Pierre Jansen
- Color process: Black and white
- Production companies: Laetitia Film; Rome Paris FIlm
- Distributed by: Société Nouvelle de Cinématographie
- Release date: 29 June 1966
- Running time: 91 minutes
- Countries: France; Italy
- Language: French

Objectif: 500 millions is a 1966 French crime drama film written and directed by Pierre Schoendoerffer and starring Bruno Cremer and Marisa Mell. who made it after the success of The 317th Platoon (1965). Jorge Semprun collaborated with Schoendoerffer on his screenplay.

== Plot ==
Reichau (Bruno Cremer) is a one time French Army captain who served three years in prison for belonging to the OAS during the Algerian War. He arrives in France, unsure what to do with his life. He decides to take part in a heist organized by Pierre (Jean-Claude Rolland), the man who sent him to prison, and mediated by the beautiful and enigmatic Yo (Marisa Mell). The heist consists of stealing a bag containing 500 million francs during a plane flight.

== Cast ==
- Bruno Cremer as Le capitaine Jean Reichau
- Marisa Mell as Yo
- Jean-Claude Rolland as Pierre
- Etienne Bierry as Douard
- Pierre Fromont as Le commandant (as P. Fromont)
- Jean-François Chauvel as Un ancien militaire de l'unité (as J.F. Chauvel)
- D. Zimbaca as Himself
- Hong Mai Thomas as La compagne de Douard (as T. Hong-Mai)

== Reception ==
The film was not a box office success being the 106th most popular movie at the French box office with admissions of 497,369.
