= La 317e section (novel) =

1963 novel by Pierre Schoendoerffer

- Author: Pierre Schoendoerffer
- Language: French
- Publisher: Éditions de la Table ronde
- Publication date: 1963
- Publication place: France
- Pages: 252

La 317e section is a novel by the French writer Pierre Schoendoerffer, published in 1963 by Éditions de la Table ronde. Set in 1954, on the day before the Battle of Dien Bien Phu in the First Indochina War, it follows a French platoon and the contrasting personalities of its two leaders, the inexperienced second-lieutenant Torrens and his warrant officer, the pragmatic World War II veteran Willsdorff.

The book was adapted into the 1965 film The 317th Platoon, directed by Schoendoerffer and starring Jacques Perrin and Bruno Cremer.
