= Maïté Nahyr =

Belgian actress (1947–2012)

- Born: 25 October 1947; Belgium
- Died: 19 August 2012 (aged 64); Marseille, France
- Occupation: Actress

Maïté Nahyr (25 October 1947 – 19 August 2012) was a Belgian actress.

== Biography ==
Nahyr was born in Belgium on 25 October 1947. Nahyr was raised in Belgium but reportedly was of South American (Paraguayan) descent. She built her professional career in Europe. Her best known film roles included Roman Polanski's 1974 film The Tenant, 1980's City of Women by Federico Fellini, and Boy Meets Girl in 1984.

Nahyr also appeared at the Théâtre National de Chaillot in Paris in 1985, where she appeared in Ubu Roi by Antoine Vitez and La Visite by Philippe Adrien. Her most recent film roles included Meeting Venus in 1991; Dien Bien Phu, directed by Pierre Schoendoerffer in 1992; and Little Nothings, a 1992 film directed by Cedric Klapisch.

Nahyr died in Marseille (France) of cancer on 19 August 2012, at the age of 64.

== Partial filmography ==
- Le nosferat ou les eaux glacées de calcul égoiste (1974) - Mère / Vierge / Reine
- Calmos (1976) - Une femme soldat
- Je t'aime moi non plus (1976) - La prostituée
- The Tenant (1976) - Lucille
- Violette & François (1977)
- Memoirs of a French Whore (1979)
- City of Women (1980) - Feminist (uncredited)
- Le bâtard (1983) - La strip-teaseuse
- Die Olympiasiegerin (1983) - Geschäftsführer
- Boy Meets Girl (1984) - Maite
- Favourites of the Moon (1984) - Madeleine Duphour-Paquet
- Ni avec toi ni sans toi (1985) - Sainte Ricard
- Didi Drives Me Crazy (1986) - Deponiechefin
- Les mois d'avril sont meurtriers (1987) - Jeanne
- Le bal du gouverneur (1990) - Mademoiselle Reiche
- Transit (1991)
- Sushi Sushi (1991) - La femme dépressive
- Meeting Venus (1991) - Maria Krawiecki
- Dien Bien Phu (1992) - L'Eurasienne
- Riens du tout (1992) - La directrice de coordination
- La nuit sacrée (1993) - Assise / consul's sister
- À la mode (1993) - Rivka
- The Smile (1994) - Mado
- Capitaine au long cours (1997) - Maria
- Sur un air d'autoroute (2000) - Mme Sandre
