= Dien Bien Phu (film) =

Diên Biên Phu
- Theatrical poster
- Directed by: Pierre Schoendoerffer
- Written by: Pierre Schoendoerffer
- Produced by: Jacques Kirsner
- Starring: Donald Pleasence; Patrick Catalifo; Jean-François Balmer
- Cinematography: Bernard Lutic
- Edited by: Armand Psenny
- Music by: Georges Delerue
- Distributed by: AMLF
- Release date: 4 March 1992 (France)
- Running time: 146 minutes
- Country: France
- Languages: French; Vietnamese
- Budget: $30 million

Diên Biên Phu (French for Điện Biên Phủ) is a French 1992 epic war film written and directed by French veteran Pierre Schoendoerffer. With its huge budget, all-star cast, and realistic war scenes produced with the cooperation of both the French and Vietnamese armed forces, Dîen Bîen Phu is regarded by many as one of the more important war movies produced in French filmmaking history. It portrays the 55-day siege of Dien Bien Phu (1954), one of the last battles by the French Union's colonial army in the First Indochina War during the final days of French Indochina, which was soon after divided into North and South Vietnam. This was a prelude to the Second Indochina War, known in the United States as the Vietnam War.

The film was nominated for "Best Music Written for a Film" ("Meilleure musique") at the 1993 French César Awards. The Điện Biên Phủ original soundtrack was composed and partially performed by pianist Georges Delerue, featuring Japanese vocalist Marie Kobayashi. In 1994, at a commemoration of the 40th anniversary of the siege at Dien Bien Phu, director Schoendoerffer published a behind-the-scenes book called "Diên Biên Phu - De la Bataille au Film" (Dien Bien Phu: From the Battle to the Movie). In 2004, during the 50th anniversary commemoration, Schoendoerffer published a full-length version of his movie in DVD format.

== Plot ==
The movie follows the chronological events of the battle. Some of them are shown in situ, from the heart of the battle, at Dien Bien Phu, while others are reported by civilians at Hanoi city or by French Union soldiers stationed at Hanoi's civilian airport.

The Hanoi action is mostly focused on British-born American writer-reporter Howard Simpson (Donald Pleasence). Simpson's sources of confidential information include French military personnel (Patrick Catalifo, Eric Do), an Agence France Presse correspondent (Jean-François Balmer), an influential Vietnamese nationalist (Long Nguyen-Khac), a Chinese contrabander (Thé Anh) and a Eurasian opium dealer (Maïté Nahyr). Simpson sends scoop-worthy news to the San Francisco Chronicle daily newspaper, through a Hong Kong-based agency, in order to elude French military censorship that existed at the time in Hanoi and the rest of Indochina.

War scenes are seen through the eyes of several character archetypes illustrating human nature. Cowards are mainly illustrated by the unnamed "Nam Yum rat" (Fathy Abdi); an example of a brave soldier is the philosopher-friendly artillery lieutenant (Maxime Leroux), who refuses to obey orders to retreat and eventually dies for the sake of honor. Since they are archetypes, these characters have no name. The main characters have fictitious names, but are members of real units, like the 5th Bawouan Vietnamese paratrooper Lieutenant Ky (Eric Do) or Captain de Kerveguen (Patrick Catalifo)'s Foreign Legion company.

Schoendoerffer's movie contains autobiographic elements that sometimes appear in dialogues and is particularly illustrated by the military cameraman character. Actor Ludovic Schoendoerffer plays the role of a young Army Cinematographic Service cameraman using the same camera type that his father, Corporal Pierre Schoendoerffer, employed in 1954.

== Cast ==
Actor/Actress	Role	Nationality
Donald Pleasence	Howard Simpson (writer, journalist)	British, American
Patrick Catalifo	Captain Victorien Jégu de Kerveguen (Foreign Legion)	French (Breton)
Jean-François Balmer	AFP employee (Agence France Presse)	French
Ludmila Mikaël	Béatrice Vergnes (violinist, Cpt. de Kerveguen's cousin)	French (Breton)
François Négret	Corporal (Train Detachment, temporary affectation)	French
Maxime Leroux	Artillery Lieutenant (African regiment)	French
Raoul Billerey	Father Wamberger (priest)	French (Alsatian)
The Anh	Ong Cop aka Mr. Tiger (gambler)	Vietnamese
Christopher Buchholz	Captain Morvan (3rd Bureau Chief-Staff)	French
Patrick Chauvel	Lieutenant Duroc (DC-3 pilot, French Air Force)	French
Eric Do	Lieutenant Ky (5th Vietnamese Parachute Battalion "Bawouan")	Vietnamese
Igor Hossein	Caporal-Chief photograph (Service Cinématographique des Armées)	French
Luc Lavandier	Sergeant (Thai unit)	French
Joseph Momo	Koulibali (African Artillery Regiment)	Gabonese
Lê Vân Nghia	Simpson's cycloman	Vietnamese
Sava Lolov	Thade Korzeniowski (Foreign Legion, Tank Chief)	Polish
Thu Ha	Cuc (Thade Korzeniowski's fiancee)	Vietnamese
Long Nguyen-Khac	Mr. Vinh (printer, nationalist)	Vietnamese
Maïté Nahyr	The Eurasian (opium dealer)	French-Vietnamese
André Peron	Lt. Ky's adjoint (5th Vietnamese Parachute Battalion "Bawouan")	French
Ludovic Schoendoerffer	Sergeant cameraman (Service Cinématographique des Armées)	French
Hoa Debris	Betty ("Normandie Chez Betty" bar's patron)	Vietnamese
"Charles" Fathy Abdi	"Nam Yum rat" (Train Regiment deserter)	Moroccan
Pierre Schoendoerffer	Narrator (voice)	French

== Production ==
Unlike many Hollywood Vietnam War blockbusters, Dîen Bîen Phu is, according to the director, more a docudrama based on real events, in the style of Tora! Tora! Tora!. Writer/director Pierre Schoendoerffer is a veteran of the battle; in 1952, volunteer Corporal Schoendoerffer joined the Service Cinématographique des Armées (French Army Cinematographic Service) as a cameraman.

On 11 March 1954, Schoendoerffer was injured at Dien Bien Phu, in a minor skirmish (Cote 781 attack) before the main battle, and he was sent to the southern base located in Saigon aboard a C-47 transport plane. Since there were no other cameramen remaining on the battlefield, Schoendoerffer insisted on returning to document the event. Finally, on March 18, he was allowed to take off from the northern base Hanoi, located at 1H15 (252 km) from Dien Bien Phu, on a C-47 and to jump with the 5th Bawouan (Vietnamese Parachute Battalion) over Dien Bien Phu.

Schoendoerffer was still injured and wore bandages when he chose to return to the battlefield. Officers told him "it's wasted, don't go!" ("c'est foutu, n'y va pas!"), but he insisted as "[he] had to be there to testify" as he planned to give his film to the pilots, after the battle, as an homage. However, nobody saw this footage since he destroyed his own camera and all his 60-second-films on May 7, except for six of them which were confiscated by the Viet Minh during an aborted escape and ended up in the hands of Soviet cameraman Roman Karmen. As a 25-year-old corporal cameraman, Schoendoerffer was not actually a journalist, but the French Army did not interfere and let him shoot everything he wanted. His films were supposed to be sent to the rear on March 28, using a C-47 belonging to a military nurse named Geneviève de Galard, but the C-47 was damaged beyond repair by Viet Minh artillery that hit the Red Cross aircraft.

Schoendoerffer used a Bell & Howell 35mm black-and-white camera with three telephoto lenses mounted on a turret. This model is known for its highly flammable film but also for "its remarkable black and grey picture quality never seen again since" dixit Pierre Schoendoerffer.

On May 7, 1954, at 6 p.m., a half-hour after the French ceasefire (except for the strongpoint Isabelle still fighting until May 8 1:00 a.m.) he was ordered to get out of his Parachute Commandment blockhouse, where he was waiting with the officers Bigeard and Langlais and the military nurse Geneviève de Galard and subsequently became a Viet Minh POW.

Once free, he became a war reporter-photographer for American magazines. In 1967, his Vietnam War black-and-white documentary, The Anderson Platoon (La Section Anderson), won an Academy Award for Documentary Feature. Later Schoendoerffer was named Vice-President of the French Académie des Beaux Arts (Academy of Fine Arts).

== International release ==
- Theater

France - Diên Biên Phu (Dien Bien Phu) (1992)
Japan - 愛と戦火の大地 ("Ai to Senka no Daichi", Ground of Love & War) (1995)

- VHS

France - Diên Biên Phu
Germany - Die Schlacht von Dien Bien Phu (The Battle of Dien Bien Phu), United Video (1993)
Italy - Die Bien Phu
Japan - スカイミッション 空挺要塞DC-3 ("Skymission Koutei Yousai DC-3", Sky Mission: Airborne Fortified Camp DC-3), Albatross & Nippon Columbia (1996)

- DVD

France - Diên Biên Phu (Dien Bien Phu), TF1 Vidéo (2004)
Germany - Die Hölle von Dien Bien Phu (The hell of Dien Bien Phu), Laser Paradise (2004)
Vietnam - Điện Biên Phủ (Dien Bien Phu), SecoFilm & Modfilm (2005)

== Filming ==
During the film's production, Vietnamese general Võ Nguyên Giáp requested to see the film's production, which Schoendoerffer refused. According to Patrick Chauvel, this was because Giáp permitted the summary execution of captured Vietnamese soldiers who fought for the French Union.
