= Pierre Guillaume (French Navy officer) =

French Navy officer

- Born: 11 August 1925; Saint-Malo, France
- Died: 3 December 2002 (aged 77); Saint-Malo, France
- Military career
- Branch: French Navy
- Service years: 1948-1961
- Rank: Lieutenant de vaisseau
- Conflicts: First Indochina War; Algerian War
- Other work: OAS leader

Pierre Guillaume (11 August 1925 – 3 December 2002, also known as "'Commandant' Pierre Guillaume" (Note: Guillaume actually rose to Lieutenant de vaisseau, a rank properly addressed as "capitaine". "Commandant" is an address for officers commanding a unit, or for higher ranks.)) was an officer of the French Navy. He took part in the Algiers putsch of 1961 and in the Organisation armée secrète, which opposed what it regarded as De Gaulle's treacherous abandonment of Algeria to the FLN terrorists.

== Biography ==
Born to a divisional General of the French Army, Pierre Guillaume graduated from the École Navale in 1948. During the First Indochina War, he was officer in an assault naval division (Dinassaut). In 1954, he was promoted to lieutenant de vaisseau. He attempted to sail to France on a junk named Le Manohara (Note: actually an 8-metre ketch) but ran aground on the coasts of Somalia on 13 November 1956.

In late 1956, Guillaume reached Paris where he learned of the death of his brother, Jean-Marie Guillaume, a paratroop lieutenant killed in the Algerian War. He requested and was granted a transfer to the Army, and took his brother's office, from 14 July 1957 to 12 March 1958. During the Algiers putsch of 1961, he was naval counselor to general Challe. After the putsch attempt failed, he was sentenced to 4 years of imprisonment. He joined the Organisation armée secrète, was arrested in May 1962, and sentenced to 12 years of imprisonment in Tulle prison.

He later worked as a naval security consultant in Saudi Arabia and took part in operations with Bob Denard in Comoros. He also fought for the Karen in Myanmar.

He eventually took on living aboard a sailship, the Agathe, moored in Saint-Malo harbour. He worked for Radio Courtoisie almost until he died. Guillaume was a close friend of Jean-Marie Le Pen and interviewed him in several occasions for the radio.

== In popular culture ==
After his death, his memoirs were published under the title Mon âme à Dieu, mon corps à la Patrie, mon honneur à moi ("My soul for God, my body for the Fatherland, my honour to myself").

Guillaume inspired the character of the "Drummer Crab" in the novel Le Crabe-tambour and the eponymous film by Pierre Schoendoerffer.

== Honors and Awards ==
- Officer of the Order of Legion of Honour
- Cross for Military Valour
- Gallantry Cross (South Vietnam)
