= Diên Biên Phu (soundtrack) =

Điện Biên Phủ Bande Originale du Film

Soundtrack album by Georges Delerue
- Released: France 1992; Japan 1995
- Recorded: 1991
- Genre: Soundtrack
- Length: 40:02
- Label: Polydor
- Producer: Polydor

Điện Biên Phủ Bande Originale du Film (Dien Bien Phu Original Soundtrack) is the soundtrack for the 1992 war docudrama Diên Biên Phu by Pierre Schoendoerffer.

The soundtrack was released by Polydor in France (Audio-CD), Japan (Audio-CD) and Netherlands (audiocassette, 513 289-4).

The music was composed by French artist Georges Delerue who also performs piano. Famous Japanese singer Marie Kobayashi performs vocals on the Communion track. The eighteen minutes plus clocking orchestral Fragments du Concerto de l'Adieu (Farewell Concerto Fragments) track is divided in ten parts. The soundtrack was nominated for "Best Music Written for a Film" ("Meilleure musique") at the 1993 French César Awards.

== French track listing ==
Điện Biên Phủ Bande Originale du Film (Polydor 513 289-2, 1992)

1. "Concerto de l'Adieu" – 9:50
2. "Fragments du Concerto de l'Adieu" – 18:16 (Fragment no 1~10)
3. "Communion" – 0:40 (vocals by Marie Kobayashi)
4. "Sortie de la Messe" – 0:54
5. "Nostalgie" – 1:28 (piano by Georges Delerue)
6. "Valse Souvenir" – 1:40 (piano by Georges Delerue)
7. "Les Copains" – 1:50 (piano by Georges Delerue)
8. "Normandie Bar" – 2:35 (piano by Georges Delerue)
9. "Confidence au Normandie" – 0:54 (piano by Georges Delerue)
10. "Les Adieux au Normandie" – 1:55 (piano by Georges Delerue)

== Japanese track listing ==
「愛と戦火の大地」オリジナル・サウンドトラック・アルバム (Universal Music POCP 7103, 1995)

1. "別れの協奏曲" – 9:50
2. "断章(別れの協奏曲)" – 18:16 (フラグメントNo.1-10)
3. "一致" – 0:40 (vocals by Marie Kobayashi)
4. "ミサからの解放" – 0:54
5. "望郷" – 1:28 (piano by Georges Delerue)
6. "記憶のワルツ" – 1:40 (piano by Georges Delerue)
7. "恋人たち" – 1:50 (piano by Georges Delerue)
8. "ノルマンディー・バー" – 2:35 (piano by Georges Delerue)
9. "ノルマンディーの秘密" – 0:54 (piano by Georges Delerue)
10. "ノルマンディーの別れ" – 1:55 (piano by Georges Delerue)

== Trivia ==
- In "Communion", Marie Kobayashi sings three times the line Seigneur prend pitié which is French for "Lord have mercy".
