= Bruno Cremer =

French actor

- Cremer as Jules Maigret in the 1991 TV series
- Born: Bruno Jean Marie Cremer; 6 October 1929; Saint-Mandé, Val-de-Marne, France
- Died: 7 August 2010 (aged 80); Paris, France
- Resting place: Montparnasse Cemetery
- Occupation: Actor
- Years active: 1953-2004
- Spouse(s): Chantal Courrier Chantal Hillion (m. 1984)
- Children: 3

Bruno Jean Marie Cremer (6 October 1929 – 7 August 2010) was a French actor best known for portraying Jules Maigret on French television, from 1991 to 2005.

== Early life ==
Bruno Cremer was born in Saint-Mandé, Val-de-Marne, in the eastern suburbs of Paris, France to Belgian parents, the youngest of three children in a middle-class family. His mother, Jeanne Rullaert, a musician, was of Belgian Flemish origin and his father, Georges, was a businessman from Lille who, though born French, had taken out Belgian nationality after the French armed forces refused to accept him for service in the Second World War. His brother was the physician and academic Georges-Alfred Cremer (1927-2013), a member of the Académie nationale de médecine. Bruno himself opted for French nationality when he reached the age of 18. His childhood was largely spent in Paris.

Bruno attended the Cours Hattemer, a private school. By the age of 12 he had developed an interest in acting, and in 1952 he went on to train at France's highly selective Conservatoire national supérieur d'art dramatique (French National Academy of Dramatic Arts).

== Career ==
His career began with ten years spent acting in live theatre, playing roles drawn from works of Shakespeare, Oscar Wilde and Jean Anouilh. He created the role of Thomas Becket in the 1959 world premiere of Anouilh's Becket. Later Cremer played Max in a French production of Bent by Martin Sherman in 1981. He regarded his basic profession as that of a stage actor, though he gravitated firmly to films.

It was in 1957 that Cremer had his first credited part in a film, Quand la femme s'en mêle (When a woman meddles), which starred Alain Delon. However, it was in 1965 that Cremer's career really began to prosper, with the film La 317e section, (The 317th Platoon), directed by Pierre Schoendoerffer and set in Indochina during the French colonial wars. From then onwards, Cremer became a popular actor and appeared in over 110 productions for cinema and television.

While Cremer tried to avoid labels and typecasting, he tended to be offered tough-guy roles, often military men. Examples from various points in his career include Section spéciale (1975), La légion saute sur Kolwezi (1980) and Là-haut, un roi au-dessus des nuages (2004). Special Section is about a kangaroo court set up in collaborationist Vichy France to ensure judicial convictions of innocent people so as to mollify the Nazis, and features Cremer as Lucien Sampaix, a Communist journalist. La légion saute sur Kolwezi (English Operation Leopard), directed by Raoul Coutard, is a documentary-style portrayal of a real-life operation headed by the French Foreign Legion in the Democratic Republic of the Congo in 1978 to rescue foreign hostages; Cremer plays a military officer. Pierre Schoendoerffer’s Là-haut, un roi au-dessus des nuages (Above the Clouds), based on his own novel, Là-haut. Cremer played the Colonel.

Some 30 other film parts of Cremer included releases by both French and foreign directors. In 1967, for example, came the film The Stranger (Italian: Lo straniero), directed by Italian director Luchino Visconti, based on the novel L'Étranger by Albert Camus, and starring Marcello Mastroianni. The 1976 release The Good and the Bad (French Le Bon et les Méchants) was directed by Claude Lelouch, with Cremer playing Inspector Bruno Deschamps.

The next year, 1977, came the thriller Sorcerer (French Le Convoi de la peur), based on Georges Arnaud’s novel Le Salaire de la peur and directed by a William Friedkin fresh from the successes of The French Connection (1971) and The Exorcist (1973). In Sorcerer, Cremer played the fraudulent Paris banker Victor Manzon, starring alongside Roy Scheider. In 1989 Cremer starred in Jean-Claude Brisseau’s film drama White Wedding (French Noce Blanche) with Vanessa Paradis.

From 1991, he became a universally known figure in France and elsewhere for his televised portrayal of George Simenon's Commissaire Maigret, a role he played until 2005, totalling 54 episodes. During this period his cinema film commitments were few, though he did appear in 2000 with Charlotte Rampling in Under the Sand, written and directed by François Ozon, in 2001 in José Giovanni's Mon père, il m'a sauvé la vie, and in 2004 in Pierre Schoendoerffer’s Là-haut, un roi au-dessus des nuages (Above the Clouds).

In 2005, in the final episode of the Maigret series, his voice was dubbed by that of Vincent Grass in Maigret et l'Étoile du Nord: Cremer was suffering from the throat cancer that made him decide to end his career.

== Later years ==
Cremer was made an officer of the Légion d’honneur in 2008.

A lifelong smoker of Punch brand cigars, he died of a cancer of the tongue and the pharynx from which he had suffered for several years, in a Paris hospital on Saturday, 7 August 2010, aged 80. His funeral service was held in Paris on 13 August 2010 at the church of Saint Thomas of Aquinas, in the VIIth arrondissement. He is buried in the Montparnasse Cemetery, Paris.

His part autobiography appeared in 2000 under the title, Un certain jeune homme (A certain young man). In it he covered not the whole of his life, but only his early career, until the death of his father.

Married twice, Cremer had a son, Stéphane, by his first wife, and two daughters, Constance and Marie-Clementine, by his second wife, psychiatrist Chantal Hillion, whom he married in 1984.

== Selected filmography ==
- The Long Teeth (1953) – L'homme qui sort de la boîte (uncredited)
- Send a Woman When the Devil Fails (1957) – Bernard
- Mourir d'amour (1961) – L'inspecteur Terens
- Le tout pour le tout (1962) – Le médecin
- The 317th Platoon (1965) – L'adjudant Willsdorf
- Marco the Magnificent (1965) – Guillaume de Tripoli, a Knight Templar
- Objectif 500 millions (1966) – Capitaine Jean Reichau
- Is Paris Burning? (1966, directed by René Clément) – Colonel Rol-Tanguy
- If I Were a Spy (1967) – Matras
- Shock Troops (1967) – Cazal
- The Stranger (1967) – Priest
- Le Viol (1967) – Walter
- The Killer Likes Candy (1968) – Oscar Snell
- La Bande à Bonnot (1968) – Jules Bonnot
- Bye bye, Barbara (1969) – Hugo Michelli
- Les Gauloises bleues (1969) – Le père
- Cran d'arrêt (1970) – Duca Lamberti / Lucas Lamberti
- Pour un sourire (1970) – Michaël
- The Time to Die (1970) – Max Topfer
- Biribi (1971) – Le capitaine
- Lover of the Great Bear (1971) – Saska
- Plot (1972) – Maître Michel Vigneau – l'avocat de Sadiel
- Sans sommation (1973) – L'ex-sergent Donetti
- Le Protecteur (1974) – Beaudrier
- The Suspects (1974) – Commissaire Bonetti
- La Chair de l'orchidée (1975) – Louis Delage
- Section spéciale (1975) – Lucien Sampaix, le journaliste ancien secrétaire général de L'Humanité
- The Good and the Bad (1976) – Bruno
- The Hunter Will Get You (1976) – L'Epervier
- Sorcerer (1977, directed by William Friedkin) – Victor Manzon – 'Serrano'
- Le Crabe-Tambour (1977) – L'adjudant Willsdorf (uncredited)
- L'Ordre et la sécurité du monde (1978) – Lucas Richter
- A Simple Story (1978) – Georges
- On efface tout (1979) – Claude Raisman
- La Légion saute sur Kolwezi (1980) – Pierre Delbart
- Même les mômes ont du vague à l'âme (1980) – Morton
- Anthracite (1980) – Le préfet des études
- Une robe noire pour un tueur (1980) – Alain Rivière
- La Puce et le Privé (1981) – Valentin 'Val' Brosse
- Aimée (1981) – Carl Freyer
- Espion, lève-toi (1982) – Richard
- Josepha (1982) – Régis Duchemin
- Le prix du danger (1983) – Antoine Chirex
- Effraction (1983) – Pierre
- Un jeu brutal (1983) – Christian Tessier
- Fanny Pelopaja (1984) – Andrés Gallego
- Le Matelot 512 (1984) – Le Commandant Roger
- Le regard dans le miroir (1985) – Éric Chevallier
- Le Transfuge (1985) – Bernard Corain
- Derborence (1985) – Séraphin
- Tenue de soirée (1986) – The Art Lover
- Sound and Fury (1988) – Marcel
- Adieu, je t'aime (1988) – Michel Dupré
- Cartel de Radjani (1989) – Joulin
- Noce Blanche (1989, with Vanessa Paradis) – François Hainaut
- La piovra (1989-1992, TV series) – Antonio Espinosa
- Tumultes (1990) – The Father
- Atto di dolore (1990) – Armando
- Money (1991) – Marc Lavater
- Un vampire au paradis (1992) – Antoine Belfond
- Falsch (1992) – Joe
- Taxi de nuit (1993) – Silver, le taxi
- Sous le sable (2000) – Jean Drillon
- Mon père, il m'a sauvé la vie (2001) – Joe
- Là-haut, un roi au-dessus des nuages (2003) – Le colonel
