= Seasons (2015 film) =

- Theatrical release poster
- Directed by: Jacques Perrin; Jacques Cluzaud
- Written by: Jacques Cluzaud; Stéphane Durand; Jacques Perrin
- Produced by: Jacques Perrin; Romain Legrand; Nicolas Elghozi; Olli Barbé
- Cinematography: Éric Guichard; Michel Benjamin; Laurent Fleutot
- Edited by: Vincent Schmitt
- Music by: Bruno Coulais
- Production companies: France 2 Cinéma; Galatée Films; Pathé; Pandora Film
- Distributed by: Pathé
- Release dates: 23 October 2015 (Tokyo); 27 January 2016
- Running time: 97 minutes
- Countries: France; Germany
- Language: French
- Budget: €33 million
- Box office: $11.4 million

Seasons (French: Les Saisons) is a 2015 French-German nature documentary film directed, produced, co-written, and narrated by Jacques Perrin, with Jacques Cluzaud as co-director. In Japanese, the film was narrated by Fumino Kimura and Shōfukutei Tsurube II.

The Japanese version used "Eversolving" by Crystal Kay for the theme song · · .

== Synopsis ==
The film traces the history of the European forest from the end of the last glacial period to the present, addressing the disruptions caused by human activities. Nature is at the center of the film, and humans appear only rarely and very gradually. The perspective is therefore as little anthropocentric as possible. It successively evokes the first hunter-gatherers, the domestication of the wolf, the clearances that wiped out the primary forest, and the development of agriculture. The village, which would form the demographic base of European society for millennia, is recalled several times through views of bell towers and the sounds of bells—also referring to the role of medieval clearing monks. Many species are shown, often in very close-up shots, to remind viewers of the beauty and diversity of European wildlife. Rural landscapes are presented, along with their quality in terms of biodiversity—they have offered many species a good alternative to the primary forest. The First World War is particularly referenced, as it contributed to the disappearance of traditional rural society. The film concludes with an essential question: after having destroyed so much, will humanity be able to create the conditions for harmonious coexistence with its co-inhabitants of the planet?

== Filming ==
The filming took place in 2013 and 2014, partly in Ain (in the Parc des Oiseaux in Villars-les-Dombes, on the Retord Plateau, and in Hauteville), in Drôme (Font d'Urle), in Isère (Vercors Massif), in Rhône (at Courzieu Animal Park, in the Monts du Lyonnais), in Loire (Chazeaux), in Savoie (in Vanoise National Park, in the Maurienne Valley, on the Mont-Cenis Massif), in Haute-Savoie (on the Mont Blanc Massif, in Merlet Animal Park, at Roc de Chère and Lake Annecy) as well as in the Netherlands, Poland, Romania, Scotland, Norway, Switzerland, and the United States.

== Reception ==
On the review aggregator website Rotten Tomatoes, the film holds an approval rating of 97%, based on 29 reviews, with an average rating of 7.5/10.
