= Almost a Man =

- Directed by: Vittorio De Seta
- Written by: Vittorio De Seta; Fabio Carpi; Vera Gherarducci
- Produced by: Vittorio De Seta
- Starring: Jacques Perrin
- Cinematography: Dario Di Palma
- Edited by: Fernanda Papa
- Music by: Ennio Morricone
- Release date: 22 September 1966
- Running time: 93 minutes
- Country: Italy
- Language: Italian

Almost a Man (Italian: Un uomo a metà, also known as Half a Man) is a 1966 Italian drama film co-written and directed by Vittorio De Seta. The film entered the competition at the 1966 Venice Film Festival, in which Jacques Perrin was awarded with the Volpi Cup for Best Actor.

== Plot ==
While locked up in a mental health clinic, Michele looks back on his life. This includes reflecting on his controlling mother and selfish brother, who influenced Michele's neurosis that makes it difficult for him to establish relationships with women.

== Cast ==
- Jacques Perrin as Michele
- Lea Padovani as Madre di Michele
- Gianni Garko as Fratello di Michele
- Ilaria Occhini as Elena
- Rosemary Dexter as Marina
- Pier Paolo Capponi as Ugo
- Francesca De Seta as Simonetta
- Kitty Swan as Girl at park
- Ivan Rassimov

== Music ==
Un uomo a metà

Soundtrack album by Ennio Morricone
- Released: 1966 (original album)
- Genre: Soundtrack
- Length: 23:08
- Label: RCA Italiana

Ennio Morricone chronology
The Hills Run Red (1966)	Un uomo a metà (1966)	How I Learned to Love Women (1966)

All music by Ennio Morricone.

1. "Requiem Per Un Destino" – 23:08 (Chorus and orchestra)
