= Maxence Perrin =

French actor (born 1995)

Maxence Perrin (born 1 April 1995) is a French actor, best known for his parts in Les Choristes (English title The Chorus), Petit homme and For intérieur.

He is the son of actor and film producer Jacques Perrin, who portrayed adult Pierre Morhange in Les Choristes.
