= Lucien Sampaix =

French journalist (1899–1941)

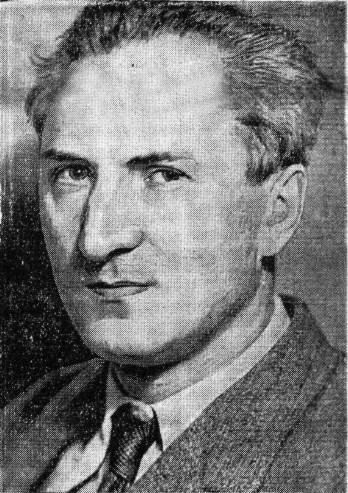
- Portrait published in L’Humanité on 14 December 1944
- Born: 13 May 1899; Sedan, Ardennes, France
- Died: 15 December 1941 (aged 42); Caen, France
- Cause of death: Execution by firing squad
- Resting place: Père Lachaise Cemetery, Paris
- Occupation(s): Journalist, metal worker

Lucien Sampaix (13 May 1899 – 15 December 1941) was a French communist journalist and member of the French Resistance.

== Biography ==
Sampaix was born in to a poor working-class family and himself became a metal worker at the age of twelve. During the First World War, aged fifteen, he fled Sedan and the German advance with his family to Marne, where he worked as an agricultural worker. He was demobilized in 1921 and started his work at a textile factory.

A member of the unitary metals union (affiliated CGTU), he was elected secretary of the metals union in 1923. In the June of the same year, he joined the newly established French Communist Party (PCF). Sampaix then participated in the campaigns of the young communist party social struggles where he protested against the occupation of the Ruhr in 1923 and against the Rif war in 1925. He made his first steps as a journalist in the local activist press by actively participating at L'Exploité de Reims, a communist weekly.

In 1929, at the age of 30, he became secretary of the Northeast region of the Communist Party. Now a permanent member of the party, he moved to Reims. He led many strikes in the region. In November 1931, following a series of articles in favour of the mutinies in the army and calling for fraternization between workers and soldiers, Sampaix was arrested and sentenced to six, then ten months in prison. He went into hiding for a time but was arrested again and served his prison sentence for nine months until a presidential amnesty.

Shortly after his release, in 1932, Sampaix joined the editorial staff of L'Humanité. There, as editor of political information, he worked alongside Marcel Cachin as editor of the newspaper, Paul Vaillant-Couturier as editor-in-chief, and Louis Aragon, responsible for general information for a time. Struck by the events of 6 February 1934, he denounced the activity of the fascists and the influence enjoyed by Nazi Germany and Fascist Italy in certain circles in France. Two years later, in 1936, he was appointed secretary general of L'Humanité. In July 1939, he denounced in a series of articles the influence of German ambassador Otto Abetz in the French press, which led to a trial on 28 July 1939, and concluded with his acquittal.

After the ban on L'Humanité on 26 August 1939, Lucien Sampaix participated in the clandestine re-publication of the communist daily, which led to his arrest by the French police in the December of the same year. After having undergone multiple transfers, he managed to escape on 25 December 1940, and resumed contact with the clandestine editors of L'Humanité, but was once again arrested next year in March 1941.

After communist soldier Pierre Georges killed a German officer at the Barbès-Rochechouart metro station, the Germans demanded retaliation from the Vichy government for his act. The Pétainist regime created special tribunals against communist and anarchist activities which condemned three communists to death, among them Lucien Sampaix. Sampaix was handed over to the German forces and killed on 15 December 1941.

After the Liberation, he was elevated to the pantheon of the PCF, with Gabriel Péri and Guy Môquet.

Lucien Sampaix had three children with his wife Yvonne, who was also a communist activist. Their youngest, Simone Sampaix (1924–1998), who joined the Resistance, was arrested in May 1942 and deported to Auschwitz but managed to survive and returned in 1945.

== Memory ==
Multiple public places and streets bear Sampaix's name, most notably Rue Lucien-Sampaix in Paris. His name appears on the commemorative plaque of the Paris Panthéon in honor of writers who died for France.

In the film Special Section from director Costa-Gavras, the role of Lucien Sampaix is played by Bruno Cremer.
