= Joseph B. Anderson =

American businessman

Joseph Benjamin Anderson Jr. (born 12 February 1943) is the chairman of the board and chief executive officer of TAG Holdings, LLC.

== Early life and education ==
Anderson was born in Topeka, Kansas in 1943. He attended the United States Military Academy and graduated in 1965 with a Bachelor of Science degree in Math and Engineering. Anderson later attended the University of California, Los Angeles, completing a master's degree in comparative government in 1972 and a second master's degree in African studies in 1973. He also studied at the United States Army Command and General Staff College in 1977.

== Military service ==
After graduation from West Point, Anderson served in the U.S. Army. During the Vietnam War he served two tours with the 1st Cavalry Division (Airmobile) in South Vietnam. He earned a Silver Star Medal, two Bronze Star Medals and an Air Medal on his first tour, and then another Silver Star Medal, three Bronze Star Medals and ten Air Medals on his second tour. In addition to his service in Vietnam, Anderson was an instructor at West Point, and served with the 82nd Airborne Division. Anderson resigned from the Army in 1978 after 13 years, at the rank of major.

=== The Anderson Platoon ===
During September and October 1966 a French film crew joined the then Lt. Anderson's platoon in Vietnam. The footage they recorded became a documentary titled The Anderson Platoon (La Section Anderson), directed by Pierre Schoendoerffer. The documentary has been shown in more than 20 countries and won several prizes including an Oscar for Best Documentary Feature Film and an International Emmy Award for Best Documentary.

The original documentary was released in 1967 and a re-edited version was released in 1987. A sequel, titled Reminiscences (Réminiscences) was released in 1989. "Reminiscences" follows up with the surviving members of the Anderson platoon twenty years after their tour in Vietnam.

== Business career ==
After leaving the military, Anderson began a business career with General Motors. After 13 years with GM, he left the firm to become the president and chief executive officer of Composite Energy Management Systems, Incorporated (CEMSI). He worked with CEMSI until 1994 when he acquired a controlling interest in Chivas Products Limited, which became Chivas Industries, LLC, in 1997. He stayed with Chivas Industries as chairman of the board and chief executive officer until 2002, when he sold his interest in the firm.

He is currently the chairman of the board and chief executive officer of TAG Holdings, LLC. In 2008 TAG Holdings and its diverse group of companies had revenues of $743 million.
