= The Paths of the Sea =

1976 novel by Pierre Schoendoerffer

- Author: Pierre Schoendoerffer
- Original title: Le Crabe-tambour
- Language: French
- Publisher: Éditions Grasset
- Publication date: 1976
- Publication place: France
- English publication date: 1978
- Pages: 332
- ISBN: 2-246-00353-9

The Paths of the Sea (French: Le Crabe-tambour) is a 1976 novel by the French writer Pierre Schoendoerffer. It is set on a patrol boat in the Arctic Ocean and is about two French naval officers who deal with their memories from the First Indochina War and the Algerian War, centred on their mutual friend Lt. Willsdorff.

The novel received the Grand Prix du roman de l'Académie française. It is the basis for the 1977 film Le Crabe-tambour which was directed by Schoendoerffer and stars Jean Rochefort.
