= Le Crabe-tambour =

Le Crabe-Tambour
- Original 1977 Theatrical Poster
- Directed by: Pierre Schoendoerffer
- Written by: Pierre Schoendoerffer; Jean-François Chauvel
- Based on: The Paths of the Sea by Pierre Schoendoerffer
- Produced by: Georges de Beauregard
- Starring: Jean Rochefort; Jacques Perrin; Claude Rich; Jacques Dufilho; Aurore Clément
- Cinematography: Raoul Coutard
- Edited by: Nguyen Long
- Music by: Philippe Sarde
- Distributed by: AMLF
- Release date: 9 November 1977
- Running time: 120 min
- Country: France
- Language: French
- Box office: $9.1 million

Le Crabe-tambour (Drummer-Crab) is a 1977 French film directed by Pierre Schoendoerffer, based on his 1976 novel of the same title, inspired by the adventures of Commander Pierre Guillaume (1925-2002). It was translated into English by the maritime novelist Patrick O'Brian as The Paths of the Sea (1977). The film stars Jean Rochefort, Jacques Perrin and Claude Rich. Highly criticially acclaimed, it won three César Awards: Best Actor – Leading Role (Jean Rochefort), Best Actor – Supporting Role (Jacques Dufilho) and Best Cinematography (Raoul Coutard) and was nominated for three others.

== Plot ==
The story concerns a trio of contemporary French naval officers on patrol in the North Atlantic who reminisce about their experiences in the First Indochina War and the Algiers Putsch. The Doctor (Claude Rich) has returned to naval service after an unsatisfying civilian life. The Capitan (Jean Rochefort), suffering from cancer, is completing his final command. The title character, Willsdorf, played by Jacques Perrin and based on the famous French Navy officer Pierre Guillaume, had been their charismatic comrade in Vietnam but became alienated when he supported the military coup in Algeria. Willsdorf now commands a fishing vessel scheduled to rendezvous with the warship. The two naval officers relate their memories as they await a possible fraught meeting -- which never occurs.

== Cast ==
- Jean Rochefort as Captain
- Claude Rich as Pierre
- Aurore Clément as Aurore
- Odile Versois
- Pierre Rousseau
- Jacques Dufilho as Chef
- Jacques Perrin as Lt. Willsdorf, "le crabe-Tambour"
- Jean Champion - (uncredited)
- François Dyrek - (uncredited)
- Bernard La Jarrige - (uncredited)
- François Landolf - (uncredited)
- Hubert Laurent - (uncredited)
- Joseph Momo - (uncredited)
- Yves Morgan-Jones - (uncredited)

== Production ==
Filming locations included Mers El Kébir in Algeria, and the helicopter base at Saint-Mandrier-sur-Mer. The film is inspired by the adventures of Commander Pierre Guillaume (1925-2002). During a bar scene, Led Zeppelin's "Kashmir" is played; it features on the soundtrack for the film.

The author of the novel and director of the film Pierre Schoendoerffer said (translated from French):

"He was one of those legendary captains! So we got to know each other, and we really hit it off. When I started writing my book Le Crabe-Tambour, there was something in his story that interested me. It's not his biography, it's my story as I dreamed it... I dedicated my novel to my youngest son, Ludovic, because when he was a child he had a little round belly on which he drummed, and because he walked on all fours and crookedly, I called him "the crab". Hence the "Drummer-Crab"! You see, it's something quite personal. It's not his life, it's not mine. It's something else."

== Reception ==
The film was highly critically acclaimed. Vincent Canby of The New York Times described it as one of the "grandest, most beautiful adventure movies in years", writing that it "may be somewhat old-fashioned in its emphasis on courage, honor and the glory of war, no matter what the cause. However, it's also wonderfully old-fashioned in its convoluted, romantic narrative, which moves from Vietnam, during the collapse of France's control of Indochina in the 1950's, to East Africa, Algeria, Brittany, Newfoundland and the stormy fishing grounds on the Grand Banks." Politique Magazine described it through an external review as the director's darkest film, a "metaphysical film which questions as much the meaning of life as that of past commitments" and which "haunts the imagination of all spectators passionate about the wars in Indochina and Algeria". In their book France at War in the Twentieth Century: Propaganda, Myth and Metaphor, Valerie Holman and Debra Kelly write that this film and L'Honneur d'un capitaine (1982) are "typical of Pierre Schoendoerffer's literary and filmic oeuvre in their determination to make the case for the defence of the colonial officer corps".

Le Crabe-tambour won three César Awards: Best Actor – Leading Role (Jean Rochefort), Best Actor – Supporting Role (Jacques Dufilho) and Best Cinematography (Raoul Coutard) and was nominated for three others: Best Director (Pierre Schoendoerffer), Best Film and Best Music (Philippe Sarde).
