= Microcosmos (film) =

- Theatrical release poster
- Directed by: Claude Nuridsany; Marie Pérennou
- Written by: Claude Nuridsany; Marie Pérennou
- Produced by: Christophe Barratier; Yvette Mallet; Jacques Perrin
- Narrated by: Jacques Perrin (French version); Kristin Scott Thomas (English version)
- Music by: Bruno Coulais
- Production companies: France 2 Cinema; Canal+ Télévision Suisse Romande
- Distributed by: BAC Films (France); Ascot Elite Entertainment Group (Switzerland); Lucky Red Distribuzione (Italy); Guild Pathé Cinema (United Kingdom)
- Release date: 6 September 1996
- Running time: 80 minutes
- Countries: France; Switzerland; Italy; United Kingdom
- Languages: French; English
- Budget: $3.8 million
- Box office: $52.8 million

Microcosmos (French: Microcosmos: Le peuple de l'herbe, lit. 'Microcosmos: People of the grass') is a 1996 documentary film written and directed by Claude Nuridsany and Marie Pérennou and produced by Jacques Perrin. An international co-production of France, Switzerland, Italy and the United Kingdom, the film showcases detailed interactions between insects and other small invertebrates, and features music by Bruno Coulais.

The film was screened out of competition at the 1996 Cannes Film Festival.

== Production ==
Microcosmos, unlike a number of other nature documentaries, does not feature narration for most of its runtime, incorporating only two brief passages of narration. In the French-language version of the film, these passages are narrated by producer Jacques Perrin, while in the English version, Kristin Scott Thomas serves as narrator.

== Reception ==
=== Critical response ===
Roger Ebert gave Microcosmos four out of four stars, calling it "...an amazing film that allows us to peer deeply into the insect world and marvel at creatures we casually condemn to squishing." Janet Maslin of The New York Times wrote that "this quick, captivating film offers a taste of the exotic to viewers of any stripe (or spot). And it's a breathtaking reminder that Mother Nature remains the greatest special effects wizard of all."

On review aggregator website Rotten Tomatoes, the film holds an approval rating of 97% based on 34 critics, with an average rating of 8.4/10. Metacritic assigned the film a weighted average score of 87 out of 100, based on 26 critics, indicating "universal acclaim".

=== Box office ===
The film has grossed $52.8 million against a budget of $3.8 million.

== Awards and nominations ==
- César Awards (France)
  - Won: Best Cinematography (Thierry Machado, Claude Nuridsany, Marie Pérennou and Hugues Ryffel)
  - Won: Best Editing (Florence Ricard and Marie-Josèphe Yoyotte)
  - Won: Best Music (Bruno Coulais)
  - Won: Best Producer (Jacques Perrin)
  - Won: Best Sound (Philippe Barbeau and Bernard Leroux)
  - Nominated: Best Film
  - Nominated: Best First Work (Claude Nuridsany and Marie Pérennou)
  - Nominated: Best Sound (Laurent Quaglio)
- Film Fest Gent (Belgium)
  - Won: Georges Delerue Award for Best Soundtrack/Sound Design, 1996, Bruno Coulais

== See also ==
- List of films with longest production time
