= A Captain's Honor =

- Directed by: Pierre Schoendoerffer
- Written by: Jean-François Chauvel; Pierre Schoendoerffer; Daniel Yonnet
- Produced by: Georges de Beauregard
- Starring: Nicole Garcia; Jacques Perrin; Georges Wilson; Charles Denner; Claude Jade; Georges Marchal; Christophe Malavoy; Jean Vigny; Florent Pagny
- Cinematography: Bernard Lutic
- Edited by: Michèle Lavigne
- Music by: Philippe Sarde
- Release date: 29 December 1982
- Running time: 117 minutes
- Country: France
- Language: French

A Captain's Honor (French: L'Honneur d'un capitaine) is a 1982 French war film directed by Pierre Schoendoerffer.

== Plot ==
A courtroom-drama about a dead Captain whose memory is publicly accused by a historian on TV, twenty years after his death. The story follows his widow's struggle to prove that he was not a murderer and did not practise torture while he was leading a ground unit during the Algerian war.

She decides to sue the man who accused him of being a torturer and thus begins an investigation which retraces the Captain's last two weeks, day by day.

The film uses numerous flashbacks depicting battle scenes in Algeria.

== Cast ==
- Nicole Garcia (Patricia Caron, the widow)
- Jacques Perrin (Marcel Caron, the captain)
- Georges Wilson (the barristers president)
- Charles Denner (Gillard, the defense counsel)
- Claude Jade (Valouin, the lawyer of the indictment)
- Georges Marchal (General Keller, a witness)
- Christophe Malavoy (Automarchi, a witness)
- Jean Vigny (Prof. Paulet, a historian)
- Florent Pagny ("la Ficelle")
