= Meeting Venus =

- Directed by: István Szabó
- Written by: István Szabó; Michael Hirst
- Produced by: David Puttnam
- Starring: Glenn Close; Niels Arestrup
- Cinematography: Lajos Koltai
- Edited by: Jim Clark
- Music by: Richard Wagner (non-original)
- Distributed by: Warner Bros. Pictures
- Release dates: 27 September 1991 (UK); 15 November 1991
- Running time: 119 minutes
- Countries: United Kingdom; United States; Japan
- Languages: English; Japanese
- Box office: $2,4 million

Meeting Venus is a 1991 British–American-Japanese film directed by the Hungarian director István Szabó and starring Glenn Close and Niels Arestrup. The movie was filmed in Budapest, Hungary.

This fictional story follows misadventures in making a modern Parisian production of the Wagner opera Tannhäuser, which in itself tells of the production of a singing contest. "Here you can be misunderstood in six different languages." The singing contest, the opera and the film explore the tension between sexuality and spirituality, punctuated by emotionally gripping vocal, choral and orchestral music. "Without hard work, there are no miracles," and in spite of committed, passionate people, the results are in doubt to the final moment in each performance.

== Cast ==
- Glenn Close as Karin Anderson (Elizabeth)
- Niels Arestrup as Zoltan Szanto (conductor)
- Marián Labuda as Von Schneider (Tannhäuser)
- Maïté Nahyr as Maria Krawiecki (Venus)
- Victor Poletti as Stefano Del Sarto
- André Champeau as Etienne Tailleur
- Jay O. Sanders as Stephen Taylor (spare Tannhäuser)
- Johanna ter Steege as Monique Angelo
- Maria de Medeiros as Yvonne
- Étienne Chicot as Toushkau
- Dorottya Udvaros as Edith
- Macha Méril as Miss Malikoff
- Erland Josephson as Jorge Picabia
- Roberto Pollak as Isaac Partnoi
- François Delaive as Thomas
- Ildikó Bánsági as Jana
- Brigitte Sy as French Customs Officer

Many of the characters in this movie have the same name and family name as director István Szabó, but in different languages. The Hungarian name István in English corresponds with Stephen. Surname Szabó means "tailor"; some persons in the film are: Stephen Taylor (English), Stefan Schneider (German), Stefano Sarto (Italian), Etienne Tailleur (French). There are also Maria Krawiecki (from the Polish word krawiec which means tailor) and Isaac Partnoi (from Russian word портной [portnoy] = tailor).

== Voice on singing scenes ==
The version of Tannhäuser that can be heard in the movie is performed by Kiri Te Kanawa as Elisabeth, René Kollo as Tannhäuser, Håkan Hagegård as Wolfram von Eschenbach and Waltraud Meier as Venus with the London Philharmonia Orchestra conducted by Marek Janowski. The composer David Bedford provided extra orchestrations and music for the film.
