= L'Etrangleur =

The Strangler
- Directed by: Paul Vecchiali
- Written by: Paul Vecchiali
- Produced by: Jacques Perrin
- Starring: Jacques Perrin; Julien Guiomar; Paul Barge; Eva Simonet
- Cinematography: Georges Strouve
- Edited by: Françoise Merville
- Music by: Roland Vincent
- Production companies: Unit Three; Reggane Films; Marianne Productions
- Release date: 5 September 1972 (France)
- Running time: 90 minutes
- Country: France
- Language: French

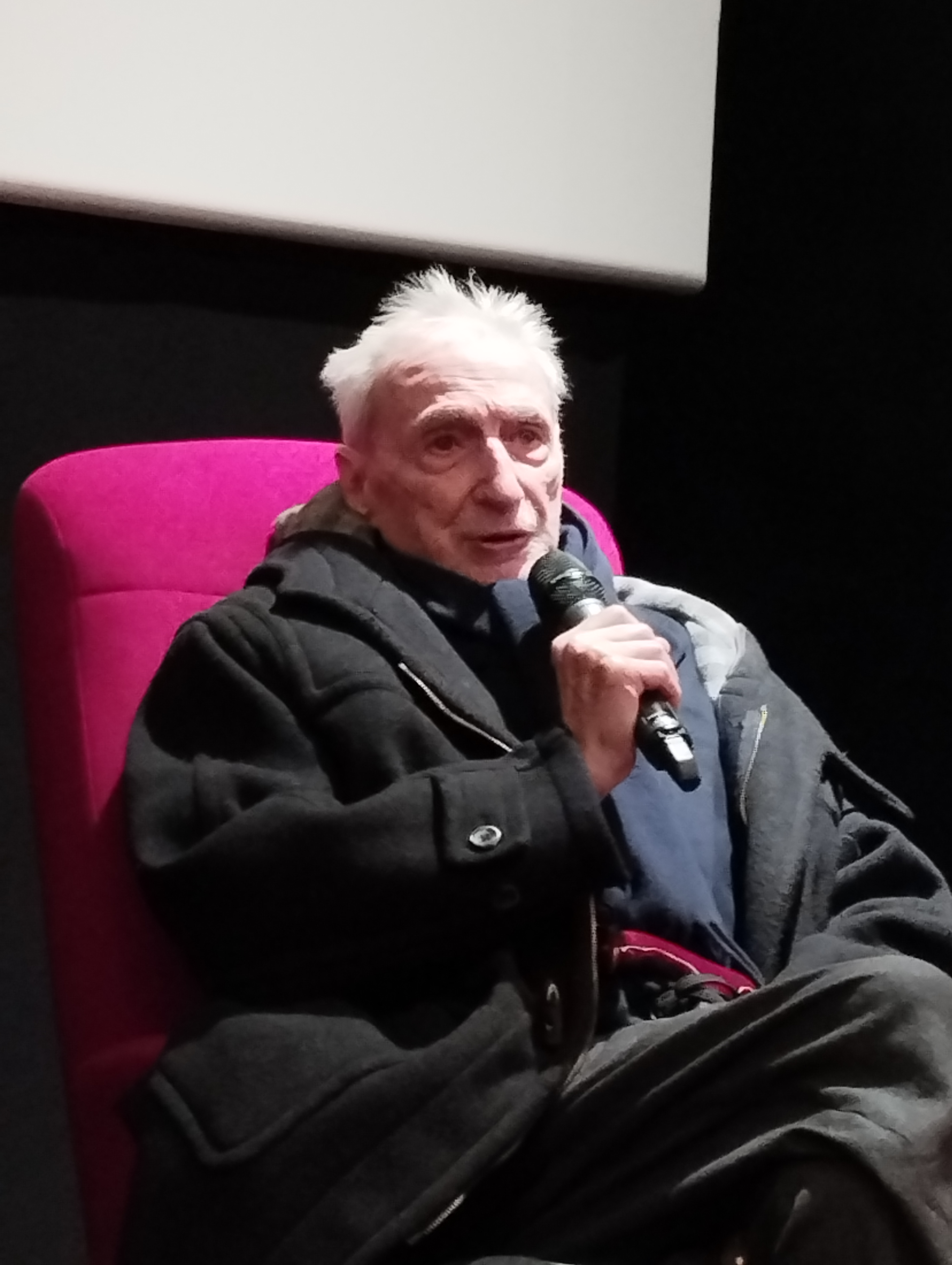
Paul Vecchiali presenting his film "The Strangler" in the room in his name at the Grand Action cinema.

The Strangler is a 1970 French psychological thriller by Paul Vecchiali which centers on a young man named Emile who strangles women who are depressed for mercy, because of the childhood trauma he endured, as the police try to catch the killer. The film was restored in 2023.
