= Code Name Melville =

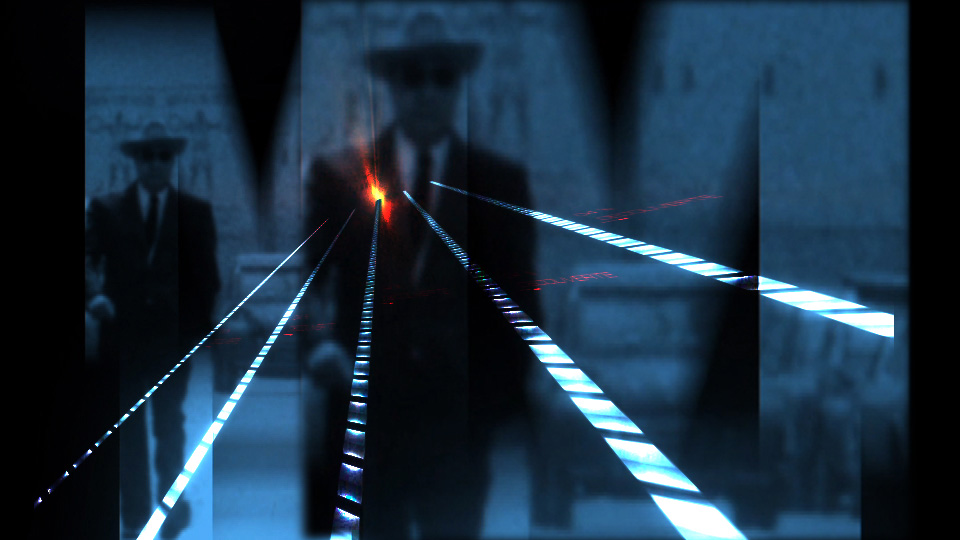
- Opening title credit
- Directed by: Olivier Bohler
- Written by: Olivier Bohler
- Produced by: Raphaël Millet; Nocturnes Productions
- Starring: Jean-Pierre Melville (archival footage); Johnnie To; Masahiro Kobayashi; Bertrand Tavernier; Philippe Labro; Volker Schlöndorff; André S. Labarthe (interviews)
- Cinematography: Julien Selleron
- Edited by: Nicolas Dupouy
- Music by: Jessica Lalanne
- Distributed by: StudioCanal (video)
- Release date: 15 November 2008 (Golden Horse Film Festival)
- Running time: 76 minutes
- Country: France
- Language: French

Code Name Melville (original French title: Sous le nom de Melville) is a feature length documentary film about Jean-Pierre Melville, directed by Olivier Bohler and produced by Raphaël Millet for Nocturnes Productions in 2008. Its world premiere took place in November 2008 at the Golden Horse Film Festival in Taipei. It has been shown on French channel CinéCinéma Classic in March–April 2010, and on Belgian channel La Deux (RTBF) in May 2010. It is the first feature documentary about Jean-Pierre Melville since he died in 1973.

== Synopsis ==
Jean-Pierre Melville, born Jean-Pierre Grumbach, was of Alsatian Jewish descent. Having to flee Nazi-occupied France during World War II, he joined the French Resistance and took the pseudonym Melville, in tribute to American novelist Herman Melville. He subsequently retained his war name as his stage name, once the war was over. His experience of the war and in particular of resistance fighting affected Melville's formative years and has an influence which can be seen in his films.

== Production ==
Code Name Melville is a co-production between Nocturnes Productions and the Institut national de l'audiovisuel (INA, the French National Institute for Audiovisual).

It has been funded by the National Center of Cinematography and the moving image, the Regional Fund of Franche-Comté and the Regional Fund of Provence-Alpes-Côte d'Azur, with the support of the French Ministry of Defence, Ciné Cinéma, RTBF and StudioCanal.

== Cast ==
- Michel Dreyfus-Schmidt
- Leo Fortel
- Pierre Grasset
- Laurent Grousset
- Rémy Grumbach
- Masahiro Kobayashi
- André S. Labarthe
- Philippe Labro
- Jean-Pierre Melville (archival footage)
- Jean-Jacques Nataf
- Rui Nogueira
- Volker Schlöndorff
- Bertrand Tavernier
- Johnnie To

== Festival screenings ==
- Golden Horse Film Festival, Taipei, November 2008
- Torino Film Festival, November 2008
- Festival International de Programmes Audiovisuels (FIPA), Biarritz, 24 January 2009 (in competition for the Mitrani Award)
- Festival international du film policier de Beaune, 9 April 2009
- Sotto le Stelle del Cinema, Bologne, 27 July 2009
- Cambridge Film Festival, 19 & 25 September 2009
- Cinecity Brighton Film Festival, 24 November 2009
- Documentary Month in Franche-Comté, 2009
- Amiens International Film Festival, 19 November 2009
- Tokyo's Franco-Japanese Institute, in conjunction with Tokyo FilmEx, 12 December 2009
- French Cultural Center in Beijing, 21 December 2009.
- Angers Premiers Plans Festival, January 2010
- Screenings as part of the Melville retrospective of the 26th French Film Festival in Singapore on 04 & 9 October 2010
- Screening at LASALLE College of the Arts, Singapore, 8 October 2010
- Screening at TischAsia (New York University Tisch School of the Arts, Asia), Singapore, 8 October 2010
- Screening at the Cinémathèque Française (French Cinematheque), Paris, 10 November 2010
- Screening at the Pera Museum, Istanbul, Turkey, on 25-26–27 February 2011
