= Jacques Perrin =

French actor and film producer (1941–2022)

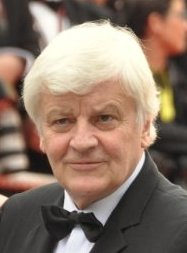
- Perrin at the 2009 Cannes Film Festival
- Born: Jacques André Simonet; 13 July 1941; Paris, France
- Died: 21 April 2022 (aged 80); Paris, France
- Education: CNSAD
- Occupations: Actor, producer
- Years active: 1957–2022
- Spouse: Valentine Perrin (m. 1995)
- Children: 3, including Maxence

Jacques Perrin (French pronunciation: [ʒak pɛʁɛ̃]; born Jacques André Simonet [ʒak ɑ̃dʁe simɔnɛ]; 13 July 1941 – 21 April 2022) was a French actor and film producer. He was occasionally credited as Jacques Simonet.

== Early life ==
Jacques André Simonet was born on the Boulevard Port-Royal in Paris on 13 July 1941. His father, Alexandre Simonet (born 1899) was the manager of the Comédie-Française and his mother was the actress Marie Perrin (1902–1983), whose surname he would adopt as his stage name once he began performing. He is also the nephew of the actor Antoine Balpêtré, who was also his sister's godfather.

Until the age of eleven, he was educated at a boarding school. After obtaining his school certificate he left school at the age of 15 and worked as a teletypist at Air France and in various retail jobs before he entered the theatre world, working with Antoine Balpêtré. Three years later, Perrin enrolled in acting classes at the Conservatoire National Supérieur d'Art Dramatique.

== Career ==
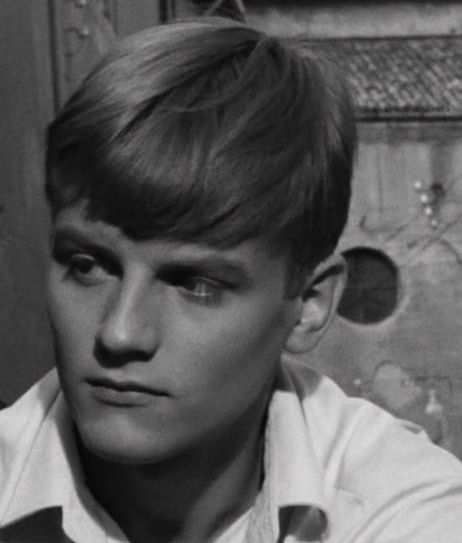
Perrin in a 1961 publicity photo

His first film role was an un-credited part in the 1946 film Les Portes de la nuit. It wasn't until 1957 that he again appeared on film, this time in a credited role in La Peau de l'ours.

It was while performing in a production at the Conservatoire National Supérieur d'Art Dramatique that he was noticed by the Italian director Valerio Zurlini. Zurlini was impressed enough with his talent to cast him in his first lead role, as a juvenile falling for a helpless Claudia Cardinale in the 1960 romantic drama La Ragazza con la valigia. Perrin became one of Zurlini's favorite actors acting for him in the role of Marcello Mastroianni's brother in Cronaca Familiare (1962) which was internationally released under the title Family Diary.

He then played roles in films by Henri-Georges Clouzot (The Truth in 1960) and Mauro Bolognini (Corruption in 1963), and leading roles in four films by Pierre Schoendoerffer: La 317e Section (1965), Le Crabe-tambour (1977), A Captain's Honor (1982) and Là-haut, un roi au dessus des nuages (2004).

He appeared in two musical movies by Jacques Demy: The Young Girls of Rochefort (1967) and Donkey Skin (1970), both with Catherine Deneuve. At 27, he created a film production company and produced and acted in Z, directed by Costa-Gavras and starring Jean-Louis Trintignant, Yves Montand, and Irene Papas. Z received the Best Foreign Film Oscar in 1969.

He produced the Costa-Gavras films État de Siège (1973) and Section spéciale (1975). Both had political themes, and as a producer, Perrin continued along this path with a documentary on the Algerian War (La guerre d'Algérie) and a film on the Chilean presidency of Salvador Allende (La Spirale). In 1973, he produced the first film by Benoît Lamy, Home Sweet Home in which he starred alongside Claude Jade as his love interest. The movie received 14 international awards.

In 1976, he produced another Oscar-winning film: La Victoire en chantant (Black and White in Color) by director Jean-Jacques Annaud. Around the same time, he embarked on Il deserto dei Tartari (1976) as a producer and an actor, co-starring Trintignant again, but also Max von Sydow, Vittorio Gassman and Philippe Noiret. The film won the Grand Prix du Cinéma Français. He was cast as the adult Salvatore in Cinema Paradiso (1988), an international success.

Perrin then devoted himself to making nature documentaries. He was the producer of Microcosmos in 1995 and producer and co-director of Winged Migration in 2001, Oceans in 2009 and Seasons in 2015.

On screen, Perrin played the part of the old Pierre Morhange, narrator of the internationally successful film The Chorus, which he also produced. The young Pépinot was played by his son Maxence.

On the Parisian stage, he gave over 400 performances in the popular French play L'Année du bac (Graduation Year), by José-André Lacour, starting in 1958.

== Awards ==
Jacques Perrin received distinctions such as the Commander of the Legion of Honour and Commander of the National Order of the Merit.

In 1966, he won two Best Actor awards at the Venice Film Festival, for the Italian film Almost a Man and the Spanish film The Search.

In 2015, he became a member of the French Marine Painters and was promoted to Commander as a reserve officer in the French Navy.

In 2016, he received the prestigious Prix du Cinéma René Clair from the French Academy.

== Personal life ==
In September 1961, while shooting Le Soleil dans l'œil (Sun in your Eyes) directed by Jacques Bourdon, Jacques Perrin began an affair with his co-star Anna Karina who was married to Jean-Luc Godard at the time. The actress then considered leaving her husband for the young actor. She told Godard of her intention to leave him in November. During the argument that followed, Godard physically destroyed all the possessions in their apartment and left. Later that night, Anna took an overdose of barbiturates. She was found by Perrin who called an ambulance. She was hospitalized and released a few days later. The papers reported that Godard and Karina would divorce and that Karina would marry Perrin. But in January 1962, it was announced that Godard and Karina had reconciled.

Perrin married Chantal Isabelle Laure Emmanuelle Bouillaut (born in 1950) on 8 November 1974 in Courbevoie, Hauts-de-Seine. The marriage ended in divorce on 30 April 1985. The couple had a son, Mathieu who was born on 1 May 1975.

He subsequently married Valentine Marie Monique Florence Perrin on 1 December 1995 in Neuilly-sur-Seine. Valentine was born on 24 April 1966 in Saumur. She is a producer best known for 1999 TV documentary series La 25e Heure and 2021 film Le loup et le lion (The Wolf and the Lion) The couple had two sons, Maxence, who was born on 1 April 1995, and Lancelot, who was born 2000. Both Mathieu and Maxence are actors.

Perrin died on 21 April 2022, at the age of 80.

== Filmography ==
=== Actor ===
- Les Portes de la nuit (1946) as Un des gosses Quinquina (uncredited)
- La Peau de l'ours (1957) as Philippe Ledrut
- Girl with a Suitcase (1960)
- The Truth (1960)
- Sun in Your Eyes (1962)
- Family Diary (1962)
- And Satan Calls the Turns (1962)
- Il Fornaretto di Venezia (1963)
- The Sleeping Car Murders (1965)
- The 317th Platoon (1965)
- Red Roses for Angelica (1966)
- Line of Demarcation (1966)
- Almost a Man (1966)
- The Search (1966)
- Les Demoiselles de Rochefort (1967)
- Shock Troops (1967)
- L'Horizon (1967)
- A Little Virtuous (1968)
- Love in the Night (1968)
- Z (1969) as Le photojournaliste
- L'Etrangleur (1970)
- Peau d'Âne (Donkey Skin) (1970)
- Blanche (1971)
- Goya, a Story of Solitude (1971)
- Home Sweet Home (1973)
- The Desert of the Tartars (1976)
- Le Crabe-tambour (Drummer-Crab) (1977)
- Raoni (1978 – narrator)
- La Légion saute sur Kolwezi (1980)
- L' Honneur d'un capitaine (1982)
- L'Année des méduses (Year of the Jellyfish) (1984)
- Race for the Bomb (1987)
- Nuovo Cinema Paradiso (Cinema Paradiso) (1988) as Salvatore 'Totò' Di Vita – Adult
- Flight from Paradise (1990)
- Flight of the Innocent (1992)
- Nothing But Lies (1992)
- The Young Girls Turn 25 (1993)
- The Long Silence (1993)
- Kim Novak Is on the Phone (1994)
- Swallows Never Die in Jerusalem (1994)
- Prima la musica, poi le parole (1998)
- Brotherhood of the Wolf (2001) as Thomas d'Apcher (old)
- Les Choristes (The Chorus) (2004) as Pierre Morhange adulte
- L'Enfer (Hell) (2005)
- Le Petit Lieutenant (2005)
- Louis XI: Shattered Power (2011)
- Goliath (2022)

=== Producer ===
- Z (1969) Academy Award for Best Foreign Film
- L'Etrangleur (1970)
- Blanche (1970)
- La guerre d'Algérie (1972)
- State of Siege (1972)
- La Spirale (1974)
- Section spéciale (1975)
- Black and White in Color (La Victoire en Chantant) (1976) Academy Award for Best Foreign Film
- Le Désert des Tartares (1977)
- L'Adoption (1978)
- Les 40ième Rugissants (1981)
- Le Peuple singe (1988)
- Médecins des Hommes (1988)
- Hors la Vie (1990)
- Guelwaar (1992)
- Erythrée, 30 ans de solitude (1993)
- Espérance (1994)
- D'Duy (1994)
- Les enfants de Lumière (1995)
- Microcosmos (1996)
- Himalaya (1996) with Christophe Barratier, Academy Award nomination for Best Foreign Film
- Winged Migration (Le Peuple Migrateur) (2001)
- 11'09"01 September 11 (2002)
- Les choristes (2004)
- Oceans (2010)
- Seasons (2016)
- The Mercy (2016)
- Team Spirit (2016)
- Mia and the White Lion (2018)
