= Jean Vigny =

Franco-Swiss actor (1919–2020)

Jean Vigny (5 October 1919 – 7 September 2020) was a Franco-Swiss actor. Over the course of his long career, he acted in theater, musicals, film, television, and radio.
