= Nocturnes Productions =

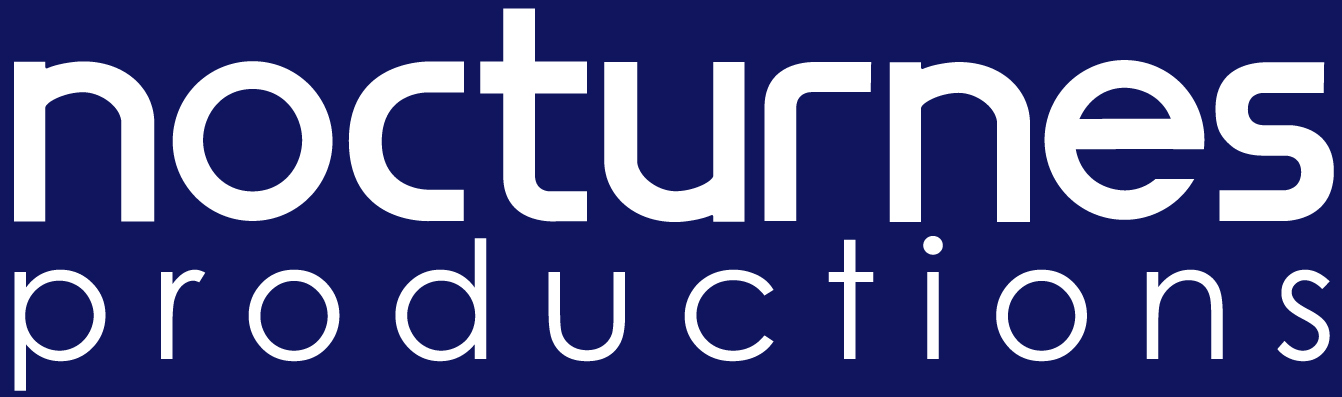
- Logo de Nocturnes Productions
- Industry: Cinema & Television
- Founded: France (2007)
- Founders: Olivier Bohler, Raphaël Millet
- Headquarters: France, Aix-en-Provence
- Products: Motion pictures; Documentaries; Corporate films
- Website: Nocturnes Productions

Nocturnes Productions is a French production company founded in 2007 by Olivier Bohler and Raphaël Millet.

== Activity ==
Nocturnes Productions produces mainly documentary films about cinema and film-makers, such as Code Name Melville directed by Olivier Bohler and Pierre Schoendoerffer, the Sentinel of Memory, Gaston Méliès and His Wandering Star Film Company, Chaplin in Bali directed by Raphaël Millet, as well as arthouse documentaries such as November directed by Abel Davoine.

It also produces short films, such as Halfway There (original French title: À Mi-chemin) directed by Arnaud Bénoliel, as well as corporate movies such as Magic of Cinema (original French title: La Magie du cinéma) for the Dubai International Film Festival and Baba Bling for Singapore's National Heritage Board.

== Filmography ==
=== Produced ===
- Code Name Melville (original French title: Sous le nom de Melville), directed by Olivier Bohler, 76 minutes, 2008. World premiered during the 2008 edition of Taipei's Golden Horse Film Festival.
- November (original French title: Novembre), directed by Abel Davoine, in coproduction with Traces (Switzerland) and Imagia (Switzerland), 101 minutes, 2010.
- Pierre Schoendoerffer, the Sentinel of Memory (original French title: Pierre Schoendoerffer, la sentinelle de la mémoire) directed by Raphaël Millet, 60 minutes 30 seconds, 2011.
- André S. Labarthe, From the Cat to the Hat (original French title: André S. Labarthe, du chat au chapeau) directed by Céline Gailleurd and Olivier Bohler, 30 minutes, 2011.
- Melville-Delon : d'honneur et de nuit directed by Olivier Bohler, 26 minutes, 2011.
- Halfway There (original French title: À Mi-chemin) directed by Arnaud Bénoliel, 22 minutes 31 seconds, 2011.
- Jean-Luc Godard, Disorder Exposed (original French title: Jean-Luc Godard, le désordre exposé) directed by Céline Gailleurd and Olivier Bohler, 64 minutes, 2012.
- The Cinematographic Voyage of Gaston Méliès to Tahiti (original French title: Le Voyage cinématographique de Gaston Méliès à Tahiti) directed by Raphaël Millet, 52 minutes, 2014.
- Edgar Morin: Chronicle of a Gaze (original French title: Edgar Morin : chronique d'un regard) directed by Céline Gailleurd and Olivier Bohler, 81 minutes, 2014.
- Gaston Méliès and His Wandering Star Film Company (original French title: Le Voyage cinématographique de Gaston Méliès dans les Mers du Sud et en Extrême-Orient) directed by Raphaël Millet, 60 minutes, 2015.
- Chaplin in Bali directed by Raphaël Millet, 52 & 80 minutes, 2017.
- The Voyages of Matisse, Chasing Light directed by Raphaël Millet, 52 minutes, 2020.
- U-96, the True Story of Das Boot directed by Raphaël Millet, 52 & 70 minutes, 2022.
