= Raphaël Millet =

French writer, critic and director

- Occupations: writer, critic, producer, director

Raphaël Millet is a French writer, critic, producer and director of cinema and television, as well as an organiser and programmer of photographic and cultural events.

== Studies ==
Having completed his secondary education at lycée Henri-IV in Paris, Raphaël Millet graduated from the Paris Institut d'études politiques de Paris (Sciences Po) in 1994, obtained a master's degree (diplôme d'études approfondies – DEA) in political science (with a specialization in African studies) from University of Paris 1 Pantheon-Sorbonne in 1995, and a master's degree (diplôme d'études approfondies – DEA) in film studies from University of Paris III: Sorbonne Nouvelle in 1996.

== Career ==
Raphaël Millet started his career in 1996–97 as a consultant for the Paris office of international law firm Shearman & Sterling, then for the Organisation internationale de la Francophonie. In 1998, he joined French National Center of Cinematography and the moving image, as advisor to the CEO. In 1999, he joined French public national television broadcaster France Télévisions, as advisor to the CEO. In 2000, he became counselor for culture, cinema, television and new media, attached to the Minister of Overseas France, Christian Paul. Simultaneously, from 1997 to 2002, he taught film studies at La Sorbonne University.

In 2002, Raphaël Millet joined the French Ministry of Foreign Affairs. From 2002 to 2006, he was posted as Cultural attaché in the Singapore, where he supervised the programming of the annual French Film Festival, and where he organised the outdoor exhibition Earth from Above (La Terre vue du ciel) by Yann Arthus-Bertrand on Orchard Road. In 2005, he curated Screen Singapore, with Shirlene Noordin, to celebrate the heritage of Singaporean cinema from pre-independence days to the present, on the occasion of the 40th anniversary of the independence of Singapore. From 2006 to 2008, he was posted in Dubai as Regional Audiovisual attaché for the Middle East.

In 2007, he founded with Olivier Bohler a production company called Nocturnes Productions which became active from 2008 onwards. There, he served as executive producer on feature documentaries Code Name Melville (2008), Jean-Luc Godard / Disorder Exposed (2012), Edgar Morin, Chronicle of a Gaze (2014), as well as director on feature documentaries such as Pierre Schoendoerffer, the Sentinel of Memory (2011), The Cinematographic Voyage of Gaston Méliès to Tahiti (2014), Gaston Méliès and his Wandering Star Film Company (2015), Chaplin in Bali (2017), and The Voyages of Matisse - Chasing Light (2020).

From 2009 onwards, while retaining his production activities, Raphaël Millet joined as a partner Singapore-based creative communications company Phish Communications, where he helped program the Month of Photography Asia and develop public relations in the arts and culture for clients such as the Peranakan Museum and Art Stage Singapore.

Since 1995, Raphaël Millet has also kept on writing articles (for magazines such as Qantara, Cinémathèque, Positif, Trafic, Atlas des Cahiers du cinéma, Simulacres and BiblioAsia, as well as for festival catalogues), together with books generally about cinema (with a specialization both in Middle Eastern and Asian cinemas). He has also published a collection of unrhymed tercet poems about melancholy loosely influenced by both Celt tercets and Japanese haikus.

== Publications ==
=== Books ===
- Cinema in Lebanon / Le Liban au cinéma, Beirut, Rawiya Editions, 2017, 464 p. ISBN 978-614-8010-01-9
- Singapore Cinema, Singapore, Editions Didier Millet, 2006, 160 p. ISBN 981-4155-42-X
- Petites mélancolies de tous les jours qui passent, Nantes, Joca Seria, 2004, 70 p. ISBN 2-84809-019-7
- Le Cinéma de Singapour. Paradis perdu, doute existentiel, crise identitaire et mélancolie contemporaine, Paris, L'Harmattan, collection « Regards pluriels », 2004, 142 p. ISBN 2-7475-6055-4
- Cinémas de la Méditerranée, cinémas de la mélancolie, Paris, L'Harmattan, collection « Regards pluriels », juillet 2002, 117 p. ISBN 2-7475-2921-5

=== Other publications ===
- Five Ashore in Singapore - A European Spy Film, BiblioAsia, Singapore: National Library Board, vol.14, issue 03, October–December 2018, pp. 10–17.
- Chaplin in Bali, BiblioAsia, Singapore: National Library Board, vol.13, issue 01, April–June 2017, pp. 02–07.
- Gaston Méliès and His Lost Films of Singapore, BiblioAsia, Singapore: National Library Singapore, vol.12, issue 01, April–June 2016.
- The Revival of Singaporean Cinema 1995-2014, BiblioAsia, Singapore: National Library Singapore, vol.11, issue 01, April–June 2015. ISSN 0219-8126 (print). ISSN 1793-9968 (online).
- Cinemas of Southeast Asia, entry on Singapore, AsiExpo, April 2012. ISBN 978-2-9528018-5-0
- « Remembering Henri Huet, the Young Veteran », catalogue of the exhibition Requiem, Singapore, Nanyang Academy of Fine Arts (NAFA), in partnership with Month of Photography Asia, July 2011, pp. 4–5. ISBN 978-981-08-9097-1
- Dictionnaire du cinéma asiatique, entries on Malaysian and Singaporean cinemas, Paris, Éditions Nouveau Monde, 2008 ISBN 2-84736-359-9
- The Encyclopedia of Singapore, entries on Singaporean cinema, Singapore, EDM/Archipelago Press, 2006 ISBN 981-4155-63-2
- Dictionnaire du cinéma, entries on African, Arab and Iranian cinemas, Paris, Larousse, 2001. ISBN 978-2-03-505031-1
- « Cimetières marins : les Méditerranées de Jean-Daniel Pollet », in Jeune, dure et pure ! Une histoire du cinéma d'avant-garde et expérimental en France, ed. by Nicole Brenez and Christian Lebrat, Paris, Cinémathèque française / Mazzotta, 2000, pp. 459. ISBN 2-900596-30-0
- « En attendant le vote des bêtes sauvages (Afrique 50 de René Vautier) », in Jeune, dure et pure ! Une histoire du cinéma d'avant-garde et expérimental en France, ed. by Nicole Brenez and Christian Lebrat, Paris, Cinémathèque française / Mazzotta, 2000, pp. 324–325. ISBN 2-900596-30-0
- « L'Indépendance cinématographique dans le champ du pouvoir. Une question éminemment politique », in Théorème, Paris, Presses universitaires de la Sorbonne Nouvelle, n°9, printemps 1998, pp. 39–48.
- « (In)dépendance des cinémas du Sud &/vs France », in Théorème, Paris, Presses universitaires de la Sorbonne Nouvelle, n°9, printemps 1998, pp. 141–178

=== Production of books ===
- The First Night Race. Photographs of the Singapore Grand Prix 2008, by Paul-Henri Cahier, Singapore, LookOutPress (an imprint of Phish Communications), 2009 ISBN 978-981-08-4012-9
- Engaging Asia, catalogue of Month of Photography Asia 2009, Singapore, LookOutPress (an imprint of Phish Communications), 2009 ISBN 978-981-08-3398-5
- Grand Prix. The F1 Legend through Photography, by Bernard and Paul-Henri Cahier, Singapore, LookOutPress (an imprint of Phish Communications), 2008 ISBN 978-981-08-1496-0

== Films ==
=== Produced ===
- Code Name Melville (2008)
- André S. Labarthe, From the Cat to the Hat (2011)
- Melville-Delon : d'honneur et de nuit (2011)
- Jean-Luc Godard / Disorder Exposed (2012)
- Edgar Morin, Chronicle of a Gaze (2014)

=== Directed ===
- Pierre Schoendoerffer, the Sentinel of Memory (2011)
- The Cinematographic Voyage of Gaston Méliès to Tahiti (2014)
- Gaston Méliès and His Wandering Star Film Company (2015)
- Chaplin in Bali (2017)
- La Poche de Saint-Nazaire, une si longue occupation (2019)
- The Voyages of Matisse - Chasing Light (2020)
- The Capitol of Singapore (2020)
- U-96, the True Story of Das Boot (2022)
- Berry été 44, une victoire volée ? (2024)
