= The Anderson Platoon =

1967 Vietnam War documentary film

The Anderson Platoon La Section Anderson
- VHS cover image
- Directed by: Pierre Schoendoerffer
- Written by: Pierre Schoendoerffer
- Produced by: Pierre Schoendoerffer
- Starring: Joseph B. Anderson
- Narrated by: Pierre Schoendoerffer; Stuart Whitman English version
- Cinematography: Dominique Merlin
- Distributed by: Office de Radiodiffusion Télévision Française (France); CBS(US)
- Release dates: 3 February 1967 (France); 1967
- Running time: 60 minutes 65 minutes (uncut)
- Country: France
- Languages: French; English

The Anderson Platoon (French: La Section Anderson, released in 1966 in Europe, 1967 in the US) is a documentary feature by Pierre Schoendoerffer about the Vietnam War, named after the leader of the platoon - Lieutenant Joseph B. Anderson - with which Schoendeorffer was embedded. Two decades later, a sequel was released as Reminiscence.

== Background ==
In summer 1966, France Soir news magazine director and French public channel ORTF producer Pierre Lazareff proposed that war reporter and director Pierre Schoendoerffer complete the "unachieved" war documentary Schoendoerffer began in 1954.

Back in May 1954, Schoendoerffer was covering the First Indochina War for the French army's cinematographic service SCA. At the siege of Dien Bien Phu, he filmed the battle between the French Union forces and the Viet Minh, but his reels were captured when he surrendered to the enemy.

After French forces departed from Vietnam in 1956, the United States increased their support for the south, culminating in full-scale military intervention and the Vietnam War.

Arguing that "the war was the same, the French only switching with the Americans", Lazareff convinced the French veteran to return to Vietnam as a kind of second chance to complete his war documentary.

== Premise ==
The French war cameraman and First Indochina War veteran Piere Schoendoerffer (38), already famous for his celebrated masterpiece The 317th Platoon (1965), returned to Vietnam.

The documentary follows a 33-man platoon led by 24 year old Lieutenant Joseph B. Anderson, who is a graduate of West Point. Lieutenant Anderson's platoon is part of Bravo Company of the US Army's 1st Cavalry Division, which is participating in Operation Irving, which lasted from September to October 1966. As part of this mission, B Company, which was previously assigned to guard a firebase, was to find and destroy caches of Viet Cong supplies within the region of Bồng Sơn in Bình Định Province, South Vietnam.

== Reception ==
The Anderson Platoon was screened in more than 20 countries and won several prizes, including an Oscar for Best Documentary Feature Film on April 10, 1968, at the Santa Monica Civic Auditorium.

- 1967: Prix Italia for Original Dramatic Program
- 1968: International Emmy Award for Best Documentary
- 1967: Academy Award for Documentary Feature
- 1968: Merit Award (BBC)

=== Anderson's comments ===
Some time after the film was released, Captain Joseph B. Anderson Jr., the leader of the unit of the US Army's 1st Cavalry Division after whom the film is named, commented on the film (and on his other experiences in Vietnam and in the military, in general). He observed:

After visiting different operations around the country, both army and Marine, he settled on the 1st Cav because of the new approach of our air mobility, or helicopter orientation. And he wound up with my platoon because of its racial mix - we had American Indians and Mexican-Americans - to our success in finding the lost platoon, my West Point background and ability to speak French. He and the film crew stayed with us day and night for six weeks, filming everything we did. They spoke very good English, and I didn't speak good enough French. And Schoendoerffer had as much knowledge and experience about the war as any of us. The film would be called The Anderson Platoon. And it would make us famous.

Captain Anderson discusses the death from friendly fire of a white soldier from California named Shannon, who is also introduced in the film. Anderson states: "I did write a letter to his folks, telling them he did an exceptionally good job. I did not describe the circumstances under which he was killed, because we were directed not to put those kinds of details in letters whatever the case may be." He continues: "The film describes the grenade as an enemy grenade. Which is not the real circumstances."

Captain Anderson notes: "I spent my last months in the base camp at An Khê, an aide to the commanding general. Being featured in The Anderson Platoon had obviously helped my career."

== Releases ==
=== Television ===
The Anderson Platoon was broadcast on the French public channel ORTF's monthly show Cinq colonnes à la une on February 3, 1967.

CBS premiered the English dub version on television in the United States on July 4, 1967. Shortly after its 1968 Academy Award, it was broadcast a second time in France's ORTF.

In West Germany, the 62 min. version was broadcast on July 17, 1968, on NDR, SFB, and Bremen III. After the Berlin Wall's fall it was broadcast in Germany, on WDR, on January 15, 1995.

=== Theater ===
This documentary was released in theaters in the United States in 1967 by Pathe-Contemporary Films.

== Alternate titles ==
- La Section Anderson: original title.
- The Anderson Platoon: English re-edited uncensored version title. This is the only accurate account for this title.
- 2. Kompanie, 1. Zug, Vietnam 1966 ("2nd Company, 1st Platoon, Vietnam 1966"): West German title. The "Anderson Platoon"'s actual name is "1st Platoon". The platoon belongs to the "B" for "Bravo" Company (the second letter in the English alphabet), and the documentary was shot in South Vietnam in 1966, hence the German title.
- Abteilung Anderson ("Detachment Anderson"): German title after the reunification. This is a translation of the original title; "Detachment" is a synonym for "Platoon" in French.

=== Home video ===
The Anderson Platoon was made available on VHS tapes in the United States only.

A 60 min. VHS re-edited uncensored video edition was released in December 1987 by Hollywood Select Video. It was re-released by Timeless Video in May 1990. Timeless released a second print in June 1999.

By June 2000, Homevision released the original 65 min. French version subtitled in English.

=== Video on demand ===
In France it was available online April 26, 2006 as a VOD pay-per-view service through the National Audiovisual Institute's website hosting the ORTF archives.

== Reminiscence ==
A sequel to The Anderson Platoon, entitled Reminiscence, was released in 1989. It depicts Schoendoerffer's meeting the platoon survivors 20 years after the events. The Minneapolis Institute of Art describes the film as, "an empathetic portrayal of the complicated reintegration they experienced transitioning to civilian life, the different roads they each took, and the war’s continued impact on them many years later."

== See also ==
- 1st Cavalry Division (United States)
- A Face of War, documentary of a US Marine squad in Vietnam in 1966
- Vietnam War
- The 317th Platoon (1965)
- Platoon (1986)
- Joe Anderson's Interview with West Point Center for Oral History

== Media links ==
- (in French) La Section Anderson on the ORTF in 1968, 10 min. sample (National Audiovisual Institute)
- The Anderson Platoon is available for free viewing and download at the Internet Archive
