= The 317th Platoon =

1965 film

- Directed by: Pierre Schoendoerffer
- Written by: Pierre Schoendoerffer
- Based on: La 317e section by Pierre Schoendoerffer
- Produced by: Georges de Beauregard; Benito Perojo
- Starring: Jacques Perrin
- Cinematography: Raoul Coutard
- Edited by: Armand Psenny
- Music by: Pierre Jansen; Gregorio García Segura
- Release date: 31 March 1965
- Running time: 100 minutes
- Country: France
- Language: French
- Budget: $66,000
- Box office: 1,653,827 admissions (France)

The 317th Platoon (French: La 317ème section) is a 1965 French black-and-white war film set during the First Indochina War (1946–54) written and directed by Pierre Schoendoerffer. The film was based on Schoendoerffer's 1963 novel of the same name.

== Plot ==
In 1954 while the Battle of Dien Bien Phu is being fought, the 317th Platoon, composed of Laotian suppletive troops, a French officer and several NCOs, is ordered to go to the Tao-Tsai post in North Cambodia. From there it hopes to reach friendly ground and evacuation towards Kratieh on the Mekong.

The leaders of the platoon are the fresh Second-Lieutenant Torrens and Warrant Officer (Adjudant) Willsdorff, a highly experienced soldier who is in his third turn in Indochina. Willsdorff is an Alsatian who was incorporated by force in the German Wehrmacht and fought on the Russian front.

One of the NCOs Sergeant Roudier is mortally wounded in an early encounter set off unnecessarily by his officer's verve. The Laotian troops place their trust in cautious Willsdorff who knows the ropes and leads hardly by proxy through the marshes and tropical forests of Cambodia.

Meager supplies are parachuted to the platoon by a friendly plane but part of the load is dropped into enemy lines. Fatality strikes and Lt Torrens eventually dies. Willsdorf leaves him to take refuge with mountain tribes.

== Cast ==
- Jacques Perrin as 2nd Lt Torrens
- Bruno Cremer as L'adjudant Willsdorf
- Pierre Fabre as Sgt Roudier
- Manuel Zarzo as caporal Perrin, radio operator
- Boramy Tioulong as sergent supplétif Ba Kut

== Production ==
Pierre Schoendoerffer had been a POW in Vietnam following the French defeat at the Battle of Dien Bien Phu.

The film was shot with a crew of six in the middle of a Cambodian forest during the rainy season. Praised for its realism less than a decade after the actual event, French military routine, drills and jargon are accurately depicted. "I imposed a strict military regime on everyone," Schoendoerffer said. "A war film shouldn't be made in comfort."

== Reception ==
It was entered into the 1965 Cannes Film Festival where it won the award for Best Screenplay. It was the 21st most popular film at the French box office in 1965.

== Legacy ==
In 2018, military historian Sir Antony Beevor named The 317th Platoon as "the greatest war movie ever made", "followed closely by 1966's The Battle of Algiers".
