= Pierre Schoendoerffer =

French film director (1928–2012)

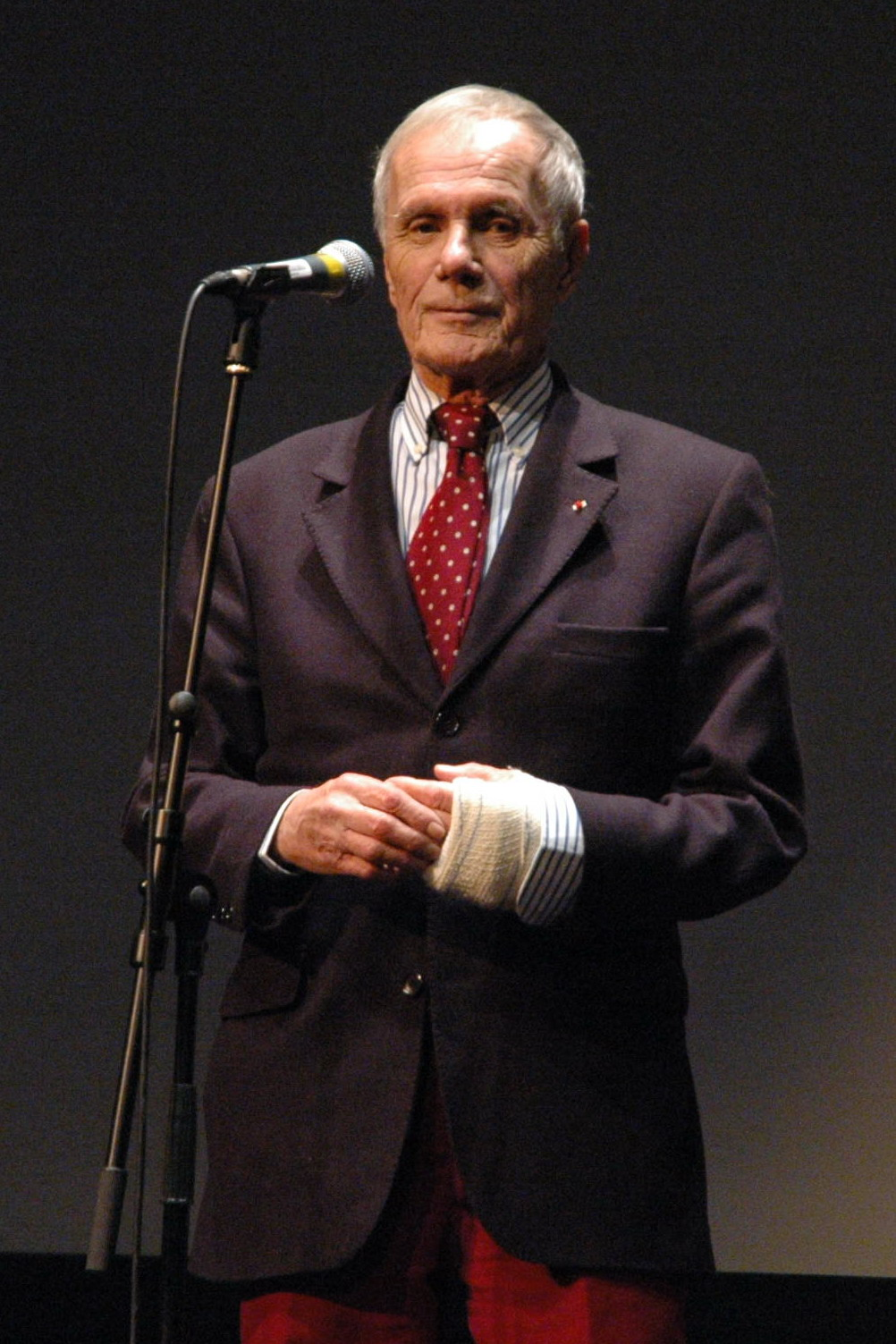
- Pierre Schoendoerffer at the Cinémathèque Française
- Born: Pierre Schœndœrffer; 5 May 1928; Chamalières, Third French Republic
- Died: 14 March 2012 (aged 83); Clamart, France
- Spouse: Patricia Schoendoerffer (1958–2012)
- Awards: Best Documentary Feature; Won: 1968 The Anderson Platoon; IATAS Outstanding Made for Television Documentary; 1967 The Anderson Platoon

Pierre Schoendoerffer (French: Pierre Schœndœrffer, pronounced [pjɛʁ ʃœ̃dœʁfɛʁ]; 5 May 1928 – 14 March 2012) was a French film director, a screenwriter, a writer, a war reporter, a war cameraman, a renowned First Indochina War veteran, a cinema academician. He was president of the Académie des Beaux-Arts for 2001 and for 2007.

In 1967, he was the winner of the Academy Award for Best Documentary Feature for The Anderson Platoon. The film followed a platoon of American soldiers for six weeks at the height of fighting in Vietnam during 1966.

== Biography ==
=== Family ===
Pierre Schoendoerffer was born in Chamalières of a French Alsatian Protestant family. As Alsace was a territory contested and annexed in the 17th, 19th and 20th centuries by both France and Germany leading to the Franco-Prussian War (1870) next World War I (1914–18), his forefathers were French, and lost all their belongings.

His maternal grandfather, who was an 1870 veteran, volunteered in the French Army in 1914 at the age of 66 and the rank of captain. He was killed during the Second Battle of the Aisne at Chemin des Dames. His father was the director of the Annecy hospital and died shortly after the end of the battle of France (1940), where he was injured.

He met his wife Patricia Chauvel in Morocco (then a Spanish-French joint protectorate), she was a journalist for France-Soir. They had three children, actor and screenwriter Frédéric Schoendoerffer, director and producer Ludovic Schoendoerffer and actress Amélie Schoendoerffer.

Pierre Schoendoerffer died, aged 83, on 14 March 2012 in France.

=== Early life (1942–47) ===
During World War II, Schoendoerffer lost his father and was not doing well with his studies at school in Annecy. In winter 1942–43, he read Joseph Kessel's epic adventure novel Fortune Carrée (1932), which changed his ambitions; he wanted to become a mariner and travel the world

In 1946, he spent his summer as a fisherman aboard a small fishing trawler in the Bourgneuf-en-Retz bay, near Pornic, Pays de la Loire (close to Brittany). From this experience he would later direct Than, the Fisherman shot in Vietnam, and Iceland Fisherman.

The following year he went back to the Pays de la Loire region and embarked on a Swedish cargo ship at Boulogne.

=== From mariner to war cameraman (1947–54) ===
In 1947, on board a merchant navy coaster, he sailed for two years in the Baltic Sea and North Sea. This experience would later find echoes in Seven Days at Sea, The Drummer-Crab and even in Above the Clouds.

From 1949 to 1950 he left the sea to fulfill mandatory military service in the Alpine infantry's 13e Bataillon de Chasseurs Alpins ("13th Alpine Hunters Battalion", 13e BCA) based in Chambéry and Modane, Rhône-Alpes. The Alpine infantry would later be the title character's corps in The Honor of a Captain.

Young Schoendoerffer had realized he was not born to be a mariner, but he did not want to be a soldier either, thinking he would be wasting his time. What he wanted to do was filmmaking. As he failed to enter the television and cinema industries, he began photography instead. One day as he read a Le Figaro article about war cameraman Georges Kowal, Killed in action during the First Indochina War, he decided to try his luck in the Service Cinématographique des Armées ("Armies' Cinematographic Service", SCA, now ECPAD).

In late 1951, he volunteered to become a war cameraman for the French army and was sent to Saigon, in French Indochina. There Corporal Schoendoerffer met and became friends with Service Presse Information ("Information Press Service", SPI) war photograph Sergeant-Chief Jean Péraud, who took him as his protégé.

Schoendoerffer's first SCA production was a 9-minute short documentary First Indochina War Rushes (1952) that would surface thirty years later on screen in The Honor of a Captain.

In 1954, his friend and superior Sergeant-Chief Péraud asked him by telegram to join him at the battle of Dien Bien Phu and he dropped with the 5th Vietnamese Parachutist Battalion (5e BPVN aka 5e BAWOUAN). As a result, upranked Corporal-Chief Schoendoerffer "celebrated" his 26th birthday in the midst of the 57-day siege. He filmed the entire battle for the SCA but after the French ceasefire and the defeat, just as the other soldiers destroyed their equipment so that it would not be captured by the Viet Minh, Schoendoerffer destroyed his films and camera. This event was later depicted on screen by his own son, Frédéric, in Pierre Schoendoerffer's 1992 docudrama Dien Bien Phu recreating the battle.

At the end of the battle in 1954, he saved and secretly hid six SCA 1-minute reels which ended up in Roman Karmen's hands.

=== From prisoner of war to war correspondent (1954–56) ===
After the battle, on 7 May 1954, he was captured and sent to a Viet Minh re-education camp. During the march to the camp, following Jean Péraud, he tried to escape with paratroopers commander Marcel Bigeard, but he was caught. Péraud vanished though and has since been Missing in action.

In prison, his life was spared at the insistence of Roman Karmen, the Soviet war reporter who directed all the main sequences illustrating the battle, from the Viet Minh raising the Red flag over General de Castries's bunker staged a few weeks after the siege, to the French Union POWs column marching from Dien Bien Phu to the re-education camp (a crane was used for the shooting), that are featured in Вьетнам ("Vietnam", 1955). During this time, Karmen had some friendly meetings with Schoendoerffer; they spoke about their job, and he revealed to the French prisoner that he had found his reels and had watched them. Karmen kept the reels though, so as a result the only footage covering the battle is from the Viet Minh's perspective.

Schoendoerffer was released by the Viet Minh four months later, on 1 September 1954. On the battle's tenth anniversary, in Paris, Schoendoerffer was invited with Bigeard to comment on the Viet Minh footage, including segments from Vietnam, which were broadcast on the French public channel ORTF (Cinq colonnes à la une show) for the first time.

After the First Indochina War Schoendoerffer left the French army and became a war reporter-photographer in South Vietnam for French and American news magazines: Paris Match, Paris-Presse, Time, Life, Look.

In April 1955 he left South Vietnam to return to France, stopping along the way in Hong Kong, Taipei, Japan, Hawaii and San Francisco.

In Hong Kong, through the AFP news agency, he met Joseph Kessel, the adventurer, World War I and Free French World War II aviator, war correspondent, reporter, and novelist whose Fortune Carrée he had admired in his childhood. Over dinner and a long "Kesselian" night with a lot of alcohol and even a little bit of opium, Schoendoerffer narrated his three-year adventure in Indochina to Kessel who was impressed. Soon they parted, but with the promise to keep in touch in Paris.

In Hollywood Schoendoerffer became an apprentice on a movie for ten days, thanks to his connections with Life magazine, but without a Green Card he was eventually forced to leave.

Back in France, he signed his first important contract with Pathé Journal and two weeks later he flew to Morocco, where the French Algeria anti-colonial rebellion was being emulated. He became a war correspondent, filming the riots for the French audience - Morocco was then a French protectorate. There he met Patricia, a journalist at France Soir, who later became his wife.

In 1956, he resigned from Pathé, whose representative threatened him: "You are leaving us? So you'll never do cinema again, because we are huge!".

=== Writer and director (1956–2003) ===
At this point Schoendoerffer was confused with his young career, the major Pathé bringing him back to the situation he experienced in 1951. As he narrated his Hong Kong meeting with Kessel to his fiancée Patricia, she convinced him to contact the one he regarded as an "historical monument".

Kessel was actually searching for him since he had a film project in Afghanistan, The Devil's Pass, and he wanted Schoendoerffer to direct it. Kessel wrote the script, Raoul Coutard, a First Indochina War photograph (SPI) veteran was in charge of the cinematography on his first film (later he would join Jean-Luc Godard), Jacques Dupont assisted Schoendoerffer with the direction and Georges de Beauregard produced it.

In 1958, he married "Pat", Patricia, the journalist he met in Morocco in 1955.

In 1959, Pierre Lazareff, founder of the newspaper France Soir (where Patricia Schoendoerffer and Joseph Kessel worked), asked him to direct a reportage about the Algerian War for his Cinq colonnes à la une (ORTF) TV show. Thanks to Lazareff he later returned to Vietnam in 1966 and made his acclaimed The Anderson Platoon for the ORTF.

In 1965 he directed "The 317th Platoon", produced by Georges de Beauregard, a black-and-white film about a platoon of Cambodian soldiers commanded by a French officer and his NCOs, retreating through Viet-Minh infested jungles. The film is acclaimed as one of the best war films ever made. The character Willsdorf, an Alsatian NCO and former Wehrmacht draftee appears for the first time.

Later in 1991 he went back to Dien Bien Phu and recreated the battle in a self-titled epic docudrama — in the fashion of Tora! Tora! Tora! — in which his son Frédéric played his own role as cameraman. The actual Vietnamese army was used to play the role of both the Viet Minh and the State of Vietnam national army fighting on the French Union's side against the Communists. Meanwhile, men from the French 11th Parachute Brigade played the role of the French paratroopers.

In the 2000s (decade), his latest productions consist of the 2003 novel The Butterfly Wing (L'Aile du Papillon) and Above the Clouds (Là-Haut, un roi au-dessus des nuages), the theatrical adaptation of his 1981 novel Up there (Là-Haut).

== Reception ==
=== Critical success ===
Pierre Schoendoerffer received acclaim in international short and feature film festivals. As a writer he won multiple festival, academy and military awards and prizes, including the Prix Vauban, in 1984, (celebrating his life achievement.)

In France he is famous for his 1977 three-time César Award-winning Le Crabe-Tambour ("Drummer Crab"), based on his French Academy-award–winning self-titled novel. His first success was in 1965 with his Cannes Film Festival Best Screenplay winning The 317th Platoon (La 317e Section). Both films are based on his experience in the First Indochina War.

He is most known abroad, particularly in the United States, for his 1967 Oscar-winning Vietnam War B&W documentary, The Anderson Platoon (La Section Anderson), originally made for the French public channel ORTF's popular Cinq colonnes à la une monthly show. It earned him an Oscar, an International Emmy Award, a Red Ribbon Award at the New York Film Festival, a BBC's Merit Award and an Italia Prize.

=== Awards ===
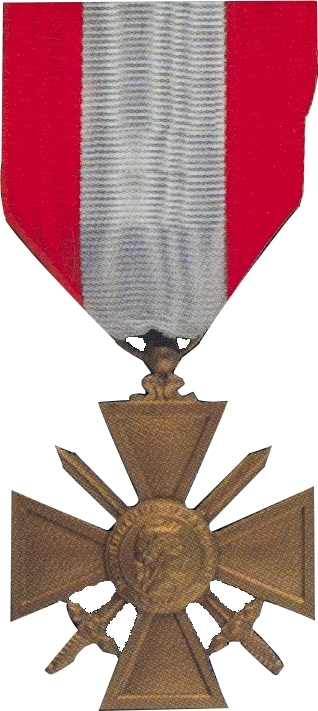
Croix de Guerre TOE

Military honors

- Médaille militaire
- Croix de Guerre TOE
- Croix du combattant volontaire

Civic honors

- Commandeur de la Légion d'Honneur
- Officier de l'Ordre National du Mérite
- Officier des Arts et Lettres
- Chevalier des Palmes Académiques

Artistic prizes

- 1965: Cannes Film Festival Best Screenplay The 317th Platoon
- 1967: Academy Award for Documentary Feature (Oscars): The Anderson Platoon
- 1967: Prix Italia: The Anderson Platoon
- 1967: Merit Award (BBC): The Anderson Platoon
- 1969: Prix Interallié: Farewell to the King

=== Fine Arts Academy ===
Pierre Schoendoerffer was elected at the Académie des Beaux-Arts' Section VII: Artistic creation in the cinema and the audio-visual field, Seat#4, on 23 March 1988, replacing Guillaume Gillet.

He was president of the Académie des Beaux-Arts from 2001 to 2007.

== Filmography ==
=== Feature films ===
- 1959: Ramuntcho (Ramuncho) based on the 1897 novel by Pierre Loti
- 1959: Island Fishermen (Pêcheur d'Islande) — based on the 1886 novel by Pierre Loti
- 1965: The 317th Platoon (La 317e section) — based on his 1963 novel
- 1966: Objectif 500 millions (Objective 500 Million)
- 1977: Le Crabe-tambour (The Drummer Crab) — based on his 1976 novel
- 1982: A Captain's Honor (L'Honneur d'un Capitaine)
- 1992: Diên Biên Phu (Dien Bien Phu)
- 2004: Above the Clouds (Là-haut, un roi au-dessus des nuages) — based on his 1981 novel

=== Feature documentaries ===
- 1956: La Passe du diable (The Devil's Pass) — co-directed with Jacques Dupont, written by Joseph Kessel
- 1967: The Anderson Platoon (La Section Anderson) — Cinq colonnes à la une TV show
- 1976: La Sentinelle du matin (The Morning Sentinel)
- 1975: Al-Maghrib al-Aqsa (Morocco)
- 1986: Le Défi (The Challenge)
- 1989: Réminiscences (Reminiscences) — sequel of The Anderson Platoon

=== Short films ===
- 1958: Than, le Pêcheur (Than: The Fisherman)

=== Short documentaries ===
- 1952: Épreuves de Tournage de la Guerre d'Indochine (First Indochina War Rushes) — segments are featured in L'Honneur d'un Capitaine (1982) and in two battle of Dien Bien Phu documentaries by Peter Hercombe (2004) and Patrick Jeudy (2005)
- 1959: L'Algérie des combats (Algeria That Fights) — Cinq colonnes à la une TV show
- 1963: Attention Hélicoptère (Warning Helicopter)
- 1973: Sept Jours en mer (Seven Days at Sea)

== Bibliography ==
=== Novels ===
- 1963: La 317e Section (The 317th Platoon) — adapted on screen in 1965 by himself
- 1969: Farewell to the King (L'Adieu au Roi) — adapted on screen in 1989 by John Milius
- 1976: The Paths of the Sea (Le Crabe-tambour) — winner of Grand Prix du roman de l'Académie française - adapted on screen in 1977 by himself
- 1981: Là-haut (Upthere) — adapted on screen in 2003 by himself
- 2003: L'Aile du papillon (The Butterfly Wing)

=== Essays ===
- 1994: Diên Biên Phu, 1954/1992 De la Bataille au Film (Dien Bien Phu: 1954–1992 From the battle to the movie) — based on his 1992 movie

== Inspirations and influence ==
=== His inspirations ===
Schoendoerffer was primarily influenced by epic adventure novels, notably Joseph Kessel's Fortune Carrée (1932). Kessel wrote The Devil's Pass (1956) he co-directed with Jacques Dupont. In the late 1950s, he adapted on screen two Pierre Loti novels, first Iceland Fisherman (1886) then Ramuncho (1897). Following his 1992 motion picture Dien Bien Phu, Schoendoerffer spent three years working on the screen adaptation of his favourite writer Joseph Conrad's Typhoon (1902). The script was ready and the filmmaker started location spotting for shooting but the producer didn't find enough money to cover the high production budget and so the project was eventually cancelled.

Young Schoendoerffer was also inspired by Hollywood movies he watched instead of going to high school class. In The 317th Platoon, there's a running reference to Michael Curtiz' Charge of the Light Brigade (1936) historical movie. In 2004, a L'Express journalist asked Schoendoerffer his favourite movie: Akira Kurosawa's Ran (1985).

Military photograph Jean Péraud was a "big brother" for him — he was three years younger — and "the most important person he met in Indochina" as well as an inspiring character model.

His own experience as a mariner, a Vietnam veteran and a globetrotter is a strong inspiration in most of his works. This is obvious in the Drummer-Crab, but the most autobiographical work is Dien Bien Phu (1992), where his elder son Frédéric impersonates him.

=== His influence ===
French actress Aurore Clément seen in the Drummer-Crab plays a role in Apocalypse Now's French plantation chapters connecting the Vietnam war with the French experience in the First Indochina War.

During the production of Oliver Stone's Platoon (1986), Stone, who was also a Vietnam veteran forced his cast and crew to live like an actual platoon in the jungle, it was the very same technique used by Schoendoerffer twenty one years earlier in The 317th Platoon.

== Film on Pierre Schoendoerffer ==
Produced in 2011, Pierre Schoendoerffer, the Sentinel of Memory is the first feature documentary about him. Directed by Raphaël Millet, it is a co-production between Nocturnes Productions and the Institut national de l'audiovisuel (INA, the French National Institute for Audiovisual). In it, Pierre Schoendoerffer revisits his life and career, with a strong focus on the impact that his experience as a war cinematographer for the French army during the Indochina War had on him.
