= List of war films and TV specials set between 1945 and 2001 =

War depictions in film and television include documentaries, TV mini-series, and drama serials depicting aspects of historical wars. The films included here are set in the time period from 1945 to 2001, or from the start of the Cold War until it came to an end in 1990s. The Cold War itself was the aftermath of World War II. At the turn of the new century the world woke up to a new reality one September morning and Cold War's aftermath period came to an end.

== Indonesian National Revolution (1945–1949) ==
- Darah dan Doa (1950)
- Enam Djam di Djogdja (1951)
- Kopral Djono (1954)
- Pedjuang (1960)
- Daerah Tak Bertuan (1963)
- Perawan di Sektor Selatan (1972)
- Mereka Kembali (1972)
- Bandung Lautan Api (1974)
- Janur Kuning (1979)
- Kereta Api Terakhir (1981)
- Serangan Fajar (1981)
- Pasukan Berani Mati (1982)
- Lebak Membara (1982)
- Film Dan Peristiwa (1985)
- Nagabonar (1986)
- Soerabaja'45 (1990)
- Oeroeg (1993)
- Merah Putih (2009)
- Merah Putih II: Darah Garuda (2010)
- Laskar Pemimpi (2010)
- Merah Putih III: Hati Merdeka (2011)
- Battle of Surabaya (2015)
- Jenderal Soedirman (2015)
- The East (2020)

== Cold War (1945–1991) ==
(Also see Cold War films)

- The Stranger (1946)
- The Iron Curtain (1948)
- Berlin Express (1948)
- The Third Man (1949)
- The Big Lift (1950)
- Big Jim McLain (1952)
- Diplomatic Courier (1952)
- The Iron Petticoat (1956)
- Jet Pilot (1957)
- Rocket Attack U.S.A. (1958)
- On the Beach (1959)
- The Manchurian Candidate (1962)
- A Gathering of Eagles (1963)
- Charade (1963)
- Seven Days in May (1964)
- Fail-Safe (1964)
- Dr. Strangelove or: How I Learned to Stop Worrying and Love the Bomb (1964)
- Rendezvous with a Spy ("Spotkanie ze Szpiegiem" in Polish) (1964)
- The War Game (1965)
- The Bedford Incident (1965)
- The Spy Who Came in from the Cold (1965)
- The Russians Are Coming, the Russians Are Coming (1966)
- Ice Station Zebra (1968)
- Topaz (1969)
- The Kremlin Letter (1970)
- The Looking Glass War (1970)
- Das unsichtbare Visier (1973–1979) (miniseries)
- Night Flight from Moscow (1973)
- The Mackintosh Man (1973)
- Starling and Lyre («Скворец и Лира» in Russian) (1974)
- Thirty Cases of Major Zeman (1974) (TV series)
- The Sell Out (1976)
- Telefon (1977)
- Twilight's Last Gleaming (1977)
- The Sandbaggers (1978–1980) (TV series)
- Firefox (1982)
- Incident at Map Grid 36-80 (1982)
- The Soldier (1982)
- World War III (1982) (miniseries)
- Enigma (1982)
- Gorky Park (1983)
- Spy Connection (1983)
- The Day After (1983) (TV)
- WarGames (1983)
- Red Dawn (1984)
- TASS Is Authorized to Declare... (1984) (miniseries)
- Threads (1984) (TV)
- Spies Like Us (1985)
- The Detached Mission (1985)
- The Falcon and the Snowman (1985)
- White Nights (1985)
- Defence of the Realm (1986)
- Interception («Перехват» in Russian) (1986)
- Top Gun (1986)
- The Fourth Protocol (1987)
- Game, Set and Match (1988) (miniseries)
- Honor Bound (1988)
- Red Scorpion (1988)
- Shootdown (1988)
- The Hunt for Red October (1990)
- By Dawn's Early Light (1990)
- The Fourth War (1990)
- Company Business (1991)
- Crimson Tide (1995)
- Akwarium (film) (1996)
- Hostile Waters (1997) (TV)
- The Assignment (1997)
- Cold War (1998) (TV documentary series)
- World War III (1998)
- Thirteen Days (2000)
- Buffalo Soldiers (2001)
- The Tunnel (2001)
- Confessions of a Dangerous Mind (2002)
- K-19: The Widowmaker (2002)
- Silmido (2003)
- Breach (2007)
- The Good Shepherd (2006)
- The Company (2007) (miniseries)
- Russian Translation (2007) (miniseries)
- A Lonely Place for Dying (2009)
- Carlos (2010) (miniseries)
- Knowledgeable source in Moscow («Осведомленный источник в Москве» in Russian) (2010)
- The Debt (2011)
- Tinker Tailor Soldier Spy (2011)
- Phantom (2013)
- The Americans (2013) (TV series)
- Despite the Falling Snow (2014)
- Jack Strong (2014)
- The Man Who Saved the World (2014) (docudrama)
- Pawn Sacrifice (2014)
- Bridge of Spies (2015)
- Deutschland 83 (2015) (TV series)
- The Man from U.N.C.L.E. (2015)
- Onset of Darkness (2016)
- Atomic Blonde (2017)
- The Death of Stalin (2017)
- Anna (2019)
- The Courier (2020)
- Firebird (2021)

== Greek Civil War (1946–1949) ==
- Guerrilla Girl (1953)
- Black Seed (1971)
- The Descent of the Nine (1984)
- Eleni (1985)
- Deep Soul (2009)

== Hukbalahap Insurgency (1946–1954) ==
- Huk sa Bagong Pamumuhay (1953)
- Huk! (1956)
- Patayin Si Sec. Magsaysay (1957)

== Indochina Wars (1946–1989) ==
=== First Indochina War (1946–1954) ===
- Rogues' Regiment (1948)
- A Yank in Indo-China (1952)
- Jump into Hell (1954)
- China Gate (1957)
- Patrouille de choc (1957)
- The Black Battalion (Cerný prapor) (1958) Czech soldiers in the Foreign legion
- The Quiet American (1958)
- Five Gates to Hell (1959)
- Fort du Fou (1963)
- Les Parias de la gloire (1964)
- La 317éme section (1965)
- Lost Command (1966)
- Le Crabe-tambour (1977)
- Indochine (1992)
- Dien Bien Phu (1992)
- The Quiet American (2002)
- The Indian (2011)
- To the Ends of the World (2018)

=== Vietnam War (1955–1975) ===
(Also see Vietnam War in film and Vietnam War films)

- A Yank in Viet-Nam (1964)
- Operation C.I.A. (1965)
- To the Shores of Hell (1966)
- The Anderson Platoon (1967)
- Philcag in Vietnam (1967)
- The Green Berets (1968)
- The Ballad of Andy Crocker (1969)
- The Losers (1970) – see Nam's Angels
- Hearts and Minds (1974)
- The Deer Hunter (1978)
- Go Tell the Spartans (1978)
- Season of the Whirlwind (Mùa gió chướng) (1978)
- The Boys in Company C (1978)
- Coming Home (1978)
- Apocalypse Now (1979)
- The Odd Angry Shot (1979)
- The Wild Field (Cánh đồng hoang) (1979)
- A Rumor of War (1980) (TV)
- The Last Hunter (1980)
- The Ten Thousand Day War (1980) (TV miniseries)
- How Sleep the Brave (1981)
- Some Kind of Hero (1982)
- The Uncounted Enemy (1982)
- Don't Cry, It's Only Thunder (1982)
- Streamers (1983)
- Uncommon Valor (1983)
- Missing In Action (1984)
- Purple Hearts (1984)
- Cease Fire (1985)
- Missing In Action II: The Beginning (1985)
- Birdy (1985)
- Coordinates of Death (1985)
- Platoon (1986)
- Combat Shock (1986)
- Full Metal Jacket (1987)
- Good Morning, Vietnam (1987)
- Hamburger Hill (1987)
- Hanoi Hilton (1987)
- Tour of Duty (TV series) (1987–1990)
- Gardens of Stone (1987)
- Hell on the Battleground (1987)
- Strike Commando (1987)
- Thou Shalt Not Kill... Except (1987)
- Bat 21 (1988)
- Braddock: Missing in Action III (1988)
- China Beach (TV series) (1988–1991)
- Off Limits (1988)
- Platoon Leader (1988)
- Distant Thunder (1988)
- White Ghost (1988)
- Born on the Fourth of July (1989)
- Born to Fight (1989)
- Casualties of War (1989)
- The Siege of Firebase Gloria (1989)
- The Iron Triangle (1989)
- 84C MoPic (1989)
- A Better Tomorrow 3 (1989)
- Air America (1990)
- Bullet in the Head (1990)
- Jacob's Ladder (1990)
- Flight of the Intruder (1991)
- White Badge (1992)
- Heaven & Earth (1993)
- Firehawk (1993)
- Forrest Gump (1994)
- The Foot Shooting Party (1994)
- Operation Dumbo Drop (1995)
- Dead Presidents (1995)
- The Walking Dead (1995)
- The War at Home (1996)
- A Bright Shining Lie (1998)
- Héroes de Otra Patria (Heroes Without a Cause) (1998)
- The Sound of the Violin in My Lai (1998)
- Tigerland (2000)
- Rules of Engagement (film) (2000)
- Father Xmas (2001)
- Green Dragon (2001)
- Under Heavy Fire (2001)
- We Were Soldiers (2002)
- Word of Honor (2003)
- Gamma Squad (2004)
- R-Point (2004)
- Faith of My Fathers (2005)
- American Gangster (2007)
- Rescue Dawn (2007)
- Journey from the Fall (2007)
- 1968 Tunnel Rats (2008)
- Sunny (2008)
- The Legend Makers (2013)
- The Post (2017)
- Danger Close: The Battle of Long Tan (2019)
- The Greatest Beer Run Ever (2022)
- Primitive War (2025)

=== Cambodian Civil War (1967–1975) ===
- The Killing Fields (1984)
- The Road to Freedom (2010)
- First They Killed My Father (2017)

=== Sino-Vietnamese War (1979–1989) ===
- Wreaths at the Foot of the Mountain (1984)
- Dove Tree (1985)
- Youth (2017)

== Indo-Pakistani wars and conflicts (1947–present) ==
- Param Vir Chakra (1990) DD Special Episodes on Indian war heroes and Martyrs.
- Border Hindustan Ka (2003)
- Ab Tumhare Hawale Watan Saathiyo (2004)
- War Chhod Na Yaar (2013)
- Nishan-e-Haider Series PTV Special Plays.
- Alpha Bravo Charlie PTV drama serial.

=== Indo-Pakistani War of 1947 (1947) ===
- Saya e Khuda e Zuljalal (2016)
- Gadar: Ek Prem Katha India and Pakistan partition of 1947 (2001)

=== Bengali language movement (1952) ===
- Jibon Theke Neya (1952)

=== Indo-Pakistani War of 1965 (1965) ===
- Prem Pujari (1965)
- Upkaar (1967)
- Operation Dwarka Based on naval operation commenced by the Pakistan Navy to attack the Indian coastal town of Dwarka on 7 September 1965 (1998)

=== East Pakistan-West Pakistan War of 1971 (1971) ===
- Ora Egaro Jon (1971)
- Stop Genocide (1971), Documentary
- Arunodoyer Agnishakkhi (1972)
- Dhire Bohe Meghna (1973)
- Hindustan Ki Kasam 1971 war (1973)
- Aakraman 1971 war (1975)
- Vijeta 1971 war (1982)
- Muktir Gaan (1995), Documentary
- Border 1971 war (1997)
- Muktir Kotha (1999)
- Matir Moina (2002)
- Joyjatra (2004)
- Megher Pore Megh (2004)
- Shyamol Chhaya (2005)
- Amar Bondhu Rashed (2011)
- Guerilla (2011)
- Shongram (2014)
- The Ghazi Attack (2017)
- 1971: Beyond Borders (2017)
- Bhuban Majhi (2017)
- Raazi (2018)

=== Insurgency in Jammu and Kashmir (1989–present) ===
- Mission Kashmir Kashmir struggle (2000)
- Roza (1982)
- Tango Charlie (2005)
- Haider (2014)
- Picket 43 (2015)
- Uri: The Surgical Strike (2019)

=== Kargil War (1999) ===
- LOC Kargil (2003)
- Lakshya (2004)
- Shershaah (2021)

== Arab–Israeli conflict (1948–present) ==
=== First Arab-Israeli War (1948–1949) ===
- A Girl from Palestine (1948)
- Allah maana (1955)
- Hill 24 Doesn't Answer (1955)
- Land of Peace (1957)
- Exodus (1960)
- Cast a Giant Shadow (1966)
- Kedma (2002)
- The Gate of Sun (2004)
- O Jerusalem (2006)
- The Little Traitor (2007)
- Above and Beyond (2014)

=== Second Arab–Israeli War (1956) ===
- Port Said (1957)
- Sammy Going South (1963)
- Nasser 56 (1996)
- The Suez Crisis (1997), TV

=== Third Arab–Israeli War (1967) ===
- The Battle of Sinai (1968)
- The Sparrow (1972)
- Avanti Popolo (1986)
- Pour Sacha (1991)
- Six Days in June (2007), documentary

=== War of Attrition (1967–1970) ===
- Road to Eilat (1994)

=== Fourth Arab–Israeli War (1973) ===
- The Bullet is Still in My Pocket (1974)
- Sons of Silence (1974)
- Sadat (1983), miniseries
- Kippur (2000)
- The Days of Sadat (2001)
- The War in October (2013), documentary
- Valley of Tears (2020), TV series
- Golda (2023)

=== First Intifada (1987–1993) ===
- Rock the Casbah (2012)
- Oslo (2021)

=== Second Intifada (2000–2005) ===
- Private (2004)
- The Green Prince (2014), documentary

=== 2006 Lebanon War ===
- Under the Bombs (2007)

=== Gaza War (2008–09) ===
- Tears of Gaza (2010), documentary

== Burmese insurgency (1948–present) ==
- Beyond Rangoon (1995)
- Burma VJ (2009 documentary)
- Rambo (2008)
- The Lady (2011)

== Malayan Emergency (1948–1960) ==
- The Planter's Wife (1952)
- Operation Malaya (1953)
- Windom's Way (1957)
- The 7th Dawn (1964)
- The Virgin Soldiers (1969)
- Stand Up, Virgin Soldiers (1977)
- Bukit Kepong (1981)

== Korean War (1950–1953) and Korean DMZ Conflict (1966–present) ==
(Also see List of Korean War films)

- A Yank in Korea (1951)
- This is Korea! (1951)
- Air Cadet (1951)
- The Steel Helmet (1951)
- Korea Patrol (1951)
- Fixed Bayonets (1951)
- I Want You (1951)
- One Minute to Zero (1952)
- Retreat, Hell! (1952)
- Battle Zone (1952)
- Mr Walkie Talkie (1952)
- Korea (1952)
- Torpedo Alley (1952)
- Combat Squad (1953)
- Take the High Ground! (1953)
- The Glory Brigade (1953)
- Battle Circus (1953)
- Mission Over Korea (1953)
- Flight Nurse (1953)
- Sabre Jet (1953)
- Cease Fire (1953) (3-D)
- Batalyon Pilipino sa Korea (1954)
- Prisoner of War (1954)
- The Bamboo Prison (1954)
- The Bridges at Toko-Ri (1954)
- Dragonfly Squadron (1954)
- Men of the Fighting Lady (1954)
- An Annapolis Story (1955)
- Target Zero (1955)
- Battle Taxi (1955)
- Crèvecoeur (1955)
- Air Strike (1955)
- Hell's Horizon (1955)
- Love Is a Many-Splendored Thing (1955)
- A Hill in Korea (1956)
- Battle on Shangganling Mountain (1956)
- Hold Back the Night (1956)
- The Rack (1956)
- Sayonara (1957)
- Men in War (1957)
- Battle Hymn (1957)
- Time Limit (1957)
- Tank Battalion (1958)
- Jet Attack (1958)
- The Hunters (1958)
- Operation Dames (1959)
- Pork Chop Hill (1959)
- Battle Flame (1959)
- All the Young Men (1960)
- Marines, Let's Go (1961)
- Sniper's Ridge (1961)
- War Is Hell (1961)
- The Manchurian Candidate (1962)
- War Hunt (1962)
- The Nun and the Sergeant (1962)
- The Hook (1963)
- The Young and The Brave (1963)
- The Marines Who Never Returned (1963)
- The Iron Angel (1964)
- No Man's Land (1964)
- Sergeant Ryker (1968) (1963 television show)
- MASH (1970) Dark comedy highlighting the antics of army battlefield surgeons in wartime Korea
- The Reluctant Heroes (1971)
- M*A*S*H (1972–83) Comedy TV series loosely based on the 1970 film MASH
- MacArthur (1977)
- Unsung Heroes (1978–1981)
- Inchon (1982)
- Wolmi Island (1982) North Korean film
- Order No. 027 (Myung ryoung-027 ho) (1986)
- Field of Honor (1986), the Netherlands Battalion in Korea
- From 5 p.m to 5 a.m (1990) North Korean film
- Shiri (1999)
- Joint Security Area (2000) An investigation of a DMZ skirmish that resulted in the deaths of two North Korean soldiers
- Silmido (2003) Story of a team of elite soldiers trained to assassinate Kim Il Sung in the 1960s
- Big Fish (2003) Reminiscences from the life of a story teller include his service as a paratrooper in the Korean War
- Double Agent (2003)
- Taegukgi (2004)
- Welcome to Dongmakgol (2005)
- Crossing the Line (2006) Documentary film about an American soldier at the DMZ who defected to North Korea in the 1960s
- Seoul 1945 (2006) (TV series) Childhood friendships are forged during the Japanese occupation of Korea and shattered by the Korean War
- Assembly (2007) A Chinese communist soldier fights in the Chinese Civil War and Korean War before searching for the bodies of his fallen men
- The Forgotten War (2009) Story of the 10th BCT, Philippine Expeditionary Forces To Korea members sent to Korea, from Inchon Landings to Battle of Yultong.
- Road No. 1 (2010) (TV series)
- 71: Into the Fire (2010)
- Legend of the Patriots (2010) (TV series), remake of Comrades
- Secret Reunion (2010) Action thriller about North Korean and South Korean spies hunting each other in Seoul
- The Frontline (2011)
- The Interview (2014)
- Northern Limit Line (film) (2015)
- My War (2016)
- Operation Chromite (film) (2016)
- Ayla: The Daughter of War (2017)
- The Battle at Lake Changjin (2021)
- The Battle at Lake Changjin II (2022)
- Devotion (2022)

== Mau Mau Uprising (1952–1960) ==
- Mau-Mau (1955)
- Simba (1955)
- Safari (1956)
- Something of Value (1957)
- The Mark of the Hawk (1957) – ambiguous setting, based on the events in Kenya.
- Guns at Batasi (1964)
- Africa Addio (1966), documentary
- The Kitchen Toto (1987)

== Cuban Revolution (1953–1959) ==
- The Gun Runners (1959)
- Pier 5, Havana (1959)
- Cuban Rebel Girls (1959)
- Cuban Story (1959)
- I Am Cuba (1964)
- The Teacher (1977)
- Cuba (1979)
- A Successful Man (1985)
- Clandestinos (1987)
- Havana (1990)
- Fidel (2002) (TV)
- Dreaming of Julia (2003)
- 638 Ways to Kill Castro (2006) (TV Documentary)
- Che: Part 1 (2008)

== Algerian War (1954–1962) ==
(also see List of films about Algerian War)

- Jamila, the Algerian (1958)
- Escape from Sahara (1958)
- Die Flucht aus der Hölle (1960)
- Commando (1962)
- Le petit soldat (1963)
- The Little Soldier (1963)
- Peuple en marche (1963)
- The Unvanquished (1963)
- Lost Command (1966)
- The Battle of Algiers (1966)
- Chronicle of the Years of Fire (1975)
- A Captain's Honor (1982)
- Nuit noire, 17 octobre 1961 (2005)
- Mon colonel (2006)
- Cartouches Gauloises (2007)
- Intimate Enemies (2007)
- Djinns (2010)
- Outside the Law (2010)
- What the Day Owes the Night (2012)
- Far from Men (2014)
- Le puits (2015)

== Hungarian Revolution of 1956 ==
- The Journey (1959)
- The Secret Ways (1961)
- Children of Glory (2006)
- The Company (2007) Miniseries

== Cyprus Emergency (1955–1959) ==
- The High Bright Sun (1964)
- Rendezvous with Dishonour (1970)

== Colombian conflict (1960–present) ==
- Clear and Present Danger (1994)
- Collateral Damage (2002)
- Guerrilla Girl (2005), documentary
- El cartel (TV series) (2008–2010)
- Inside: FARC Hostage Rescue (2008), documentary
- Greetings to the Devil (2011)
- The Snitch Cartel (2011)
- Escobar, el Patrón del Mal (TV series) (2012)
- Narcos (TV series) (2015–2016)
- Wild District (2018)
- Forgotten We'll Be (2020)

== Indian annexation of Goa (1961) ==
- Saat Hindustani (1969)
- Trikal (1985)

== Dhofar Rebellion (1962–1976) ==
- The Hour of Liberation Has Arrived (1974)
- Killer Elite (2011)

== Sino-Indian War (1962) ==
- Ratha Thilagam (1963)
- Haqeeqat (1964)
- Khamoshi (1969)
- Tubelight (2017)
- Subedar Joginder Singh (2018)
- Paltan (2018)

== Aden Emergency (1963–1967) ==
- The Last Post (TV series) (2017)

== Modern Wars in Sub-Saharan Africa (1960–1999 ) ==
=== Congo Crisis (1960–1966) ===
- Dark of the Sun (1968)
- Lumumba (2000)
- Mister BOB (2011) (TV)
- Siege of Jadotville (2016)

=== Eritrean War of Independence (1961–1991) ===
- Heart of Fire (2008)

=== Guinea-Bissau War of Independence (1963–1974) ===
- Annos no assa luta (1976)
- Mortu Nega (1987)
- Xime (1994)
- The Two Faces of War (2004), documentary

=== Mozambican War of Independence (1964–1974) ===
- Vreme leoparda (O Tempo dos Leopardos) (1985)

=== Rhodesian Bush War (1964–1979) ===
- Albino (1976)
- A Game for Vultures (1979)
- Blind Justice (1988)
- Flame (1998)

=== Chadian Civil War (1965–79) ===
- The Passenger (1975)

=== South African Border War / Namibian War of Independence (1966–1990) ===
- Moffie (2019)
- Namibia: The Struggle for Liberation (2007)

=== Nigerian Civil War (1967–1970) ===
- Tears of the Sun (2003)
- Half of a Yellow Sun (2013)

=== Angolan Civil War (1975–2002) ===
- Escape from Angola (1976)
- The Gods Must Be Crazy II (1980)
- The Hero (2004)

=== Chadian–Libyan conflict (1978–1987) ===
- In the Army Now (1994)

=== Uganda–Tanzania War (1978–1979) ===
- Rise and Fall of Idi Amin (1981)

=== Second Sudanese Civil War (1983–2005) ===
- Machine Gun Preacher (2011)

=== Lord's Resistance Army insurgency in Uganda (1987–present) ===
- Kony 2012 (2012), documentary

=== Somali Civil War (1988–present) ===
- Black Hawk Down (2001)
- Captain Phillips (2013)
- The Pirates of Somalia (2017)
- Escape from Mogadishu (2021)

=== First Liberian Civil War (1989–1997) ===
- Freetown (2015)

=== Rwandan Civil War (1990–1994) ===
- Hotel Rwanda (2004)
- Shooting Dogs (2005)
- Sometimes in April (2005)
- Beyond The Gates (2005)
- A Sunday in Kigali (Un dimanche à Kigali) (2006)
- Primeval (2007)
- Shake Hands with the Devil (2007)

=== Second Congo War (1998–2003) ===
- War Witch (2012)

=== Sierra Leone Civil War (1991–2002) ===
- Cry Freetown (2000), documentary
- Blood Diamond (2006)
- Ezra (2007)
- La vita non perde valore (2012), documentary

=== Second Liberian Civil War (1999–2003) ===
- Lord of War (2005)
- Johnny Mad Dog (2008)
- Beasts of No Nation (2015)

== Indonesian killings of 1965–66 ==
- The Year of Living Dangerously (1982)
- Pengkhianatan G30S/PKI (1984)
- Gie (2005)
- 40 Years of Silence： An Indonesian Tragedy (2009)
- Sang Penari (2011)
- The Act of Killing (2012), Documentary
- The Look of Silence (2014)

== Naxalite–Maoist insurgency in India (1967–present) ==
- The Naxalites (1980)
- Aranyakam (1988)
- Red Alert: The War Within (2010)
- Chakravyuh (2012)

== Communist Insurgency of the Philippines (1969–present) ==
- Ama Namin (1998)
- Huk! (1956)
- Ex-Army
- Ultimatum Ceasefire (1987)

== The Troubles in Northern Ireland (1969–2005) ==
- The Outsider (1980)
- Harry's Game TV miniseries (1982)
- Cal (1984)
- A Prayer for the Dying (1987)
- Patriot Games (1992)
- The Crying Game (1992)
- In the Name of the Father (1993)
- Blown Away (1994)
- The Devil's Own (1997)
- The Boxer (1997)
- Resurrection Man (1998)
- H3 (2001)
- Bloody Sunday (2002)
- Battle of the Bogside documentary film (2004)
- Omagh (2004)
- Johnny Was (2006)
- Fifty Dead Men Walking (2008)
- Hunger (2008)
- '71 (2014)

== Islamic Insurgency of the Philippines (1970–present) ==
- Mistah (Mga Mandirigma) (1994)
- Bagong Buwan (2001)

== Yugoslav counter-insurgency against Bugojno group (1972) ==
- Brisani prostor (1985), TV series
- Balkanska pravila (1997)

== Turkish invasion of Cyprus (1974) ==
- Kartal Yuvası (film) (1974)
- Tomorrow's Warrior (1981)
- Under the Stars (2001)
- The Palace (2011)

== Indonesian invasion of East Timor (1975–1976) ==
- Balibo (2009)

== Lebanese Civil War (1975–1990) ==
- Circle of Deceit (1981)
- The Delta Force (1986)
- Witness in the War Zone (1987)
- Navy SEALs (1990)
- al-I'sar [in Arabic] (~1992)
- West Beirut (1998)
- Zozo (2005)

=== First Lebanon War (1982) ===
- Ricochets (Shtei Etzbaot Mi'Tzidon) (1986)
- Time for Cherries (Onat Haduvdevanim) (1991)
- Cup Final (1991)
- Beaufort (2007)
- Waltz with Bashir (2008)
- Lebanon (2009)

=== War of the Camps (1985–1988) ===
- Spy Game (2001)

== Operation Entebbe (1976) ==
- Victory at Entebbe (1976) (TV)
- Mivtsa Yonatan (1977)
- Raid On Entebbe (1977) (TV)
- Rise and Fall of Idi Amin (1981)
- The Last King of Scotland (2006)
- Entebbe (2018)

== Nicaraguan Revolution (1961–1992) ==
- Under Fire (1983)
- Last Plane Out (1983)
- Latino (1985)
- Carla's Song (1997)
- Kill the Messenger (2014)

== Chadian–Libyan War (1978–1987) ==
- In the Army Now (1994)

== Soviet–Afghan War (1979–1989) and Afghan Civil War (1992–1996) ==
- Days of Hell (1986)
- The Living Daylights (1987)
- All Costs Paid (1988), TV miniseries
- Rambo III (1988)
- The Beast of War (1988)
- Afghanistan – The last war bus (1989)
- Cargo 300 («Груз 300» in Russian) (1989)
- Afghan Breakdown (1991)
- Peshavar Waltz (1994), Russian war film on Afghanistan
- Spetsnaz (2002), TV miniseries
- 9th Company (2005)
- Charlie Wilson's War (2007)
- The Kite Runner (2007)
- The Caravan Hunters («Охотники за караванами» in Russian) (2010), TV miniseries
- Kandagar (2010)
- Leaving Afghanistan (2019)

== Internal conflict in Peru (1980–present) ==
- The Mouth of the Wolf (1988)

== Iran–Iraq War (1980–1988) ==
(Also see Sacred Defense cinema)

- Ravayat-e Fath, a war documentary film
- A Military Base in Hell (1984)
- Eagles (1984)
- A Boat to the Beach (1985)
- Alhodood Almultahebah (The Flaming Borders) (1986)
- Sea Clamor (1987)
- The Marriage of the Blessed (1989)
- The Immigrant (1990)
- Snake Fang (1990)
- The Human Shield (1992)
- From Karkheh to Rhein (1992)
- The Glass Agency (1998)
- Big Drum Under Left Foot (2004)
- Duel (2004)
- Kilomètre Zéro (Kilometer Zero) (2005)
- Ekhrajiha (2007)
- The Night Bus (2007)
- Persepolis (2007)
- Ruz-e-sevom (The Third Day) (2007)
- Dar Chashm-e Baad (In the Wind's Eyes) (2008), TV series
- Shoghe parvaz (Passion for Flying) (2012–2013), TV series
- Che (2014)
- Track 143 (2014)
- Until Ahmed Returns (2014)
- Breath (2016)
- Under the Shadow (2016)
- The Lost Strait (2018)

== Salvadoran Civil War (1980–1992) ==
- S.A.S. à San Salvador (1983)
- Witness to War: Dr. Charlie Clements (1985) (Academy Award, Documentary Short)
- Salvador (1986)
- Romero (1989)
- Voces inocentes (2004) (Innocent Voices)

== Falklands War (1982) ==
- Los Chicos De La Guerra (1984)
- Tumbledown (1988) (TV)
- Resurrected (1989)
- An Ungentlemanly Act (1992) (TV)
- Pozo de zorro (Fox hole) (1999)
- Iluminados Por El Fuego (Blessed by Fire) (2005)
- 1982, Estuvimos ahí (1982, We were there) (2004)
- This Is England (2007)
- The Iron Lady (2011)
- Combatientes (Combatans) (2013) (TV)
- Soldado Argentino Solo Conocido por Dios (Soldiers Only Know by God) (2017)

== Sri Lankan Civil War (1983–2009) ==
- Kannathil Muthamittal (2002)
- Prabhakaran (2008)
- The Road from Elephant Pass (2009)
- Ira Handa Yata (2010)
- Sengadal (2010, not yet released, banned in India and Sri Lanka)
- Matha (2012)
- Madras Cafe (2013)
- A Private War (2018)

== US Invasion of Grenada (1983) ==
- Heartbreak Ridge (1986)

== Al-Anfal Campaign (1986–1989) ==
- Jiyan (2002)
- Kilomètre Zéro (Kilometer Zero) (2005)
- Sirta la gal ba (2009)
- Triage (2009)

== South Yemen Civil War (1986) ==
- Russian Translation (2007), TV series

== First Nagorno-Karabakh War (1988–1994) ==
- Aram (2002)
- A Trip to Karabakh (2005)
- Chakatagir (Destiny) (2006)
- A Story of People in War and Peace (2007), documentary
- Yaddaş (The Memory) (2010)
- Dolu (2012)
- If Only Everyone (2012)
- The Last Inhabitant (2016)

== United States invasion of Panama (1989–1990) ==
- The Panama Deception (1992) (documentary)
- Noriega: God's Favorite (2000) (TV movie)
- Invasion (2014) (documentary)

== Rwandan Civil War (1990-1994) ==
- Hotel Rwanda

== Gulf War (1990–1991) ==
(Also see Gulf War films)

- Hot Shots! (1991)
- The Heroes of Desert Storm (1991)
- Lessons of Darkness (1992)
- The Human Shield (1992)
- The Finest Hour (1992)
- Courage Under Fire (1996)
- The One That Got Away (1996) (TV)
- Thanks of a Grateful Nation (1998) (TV)
- Three Kings (1999)
- Bravo Two Zero (1999) (TV)
- Live From Baghdad (2002) (TV)
- The Manchurian Candidate (2004)
- Jarhead (2005)
- Dawn of the World (2008)
- House of Saddam (2008) (TV)
- The Devil's Double (2011)
- Airlift (2016)

== Algerian Civil War (1991–2002) ==
- Barakat! (2006)
- Of Gods and Men (2010)

== Yugoslav Wars (1991–1999) ==
(also see List of Yugoslav Wars films)

- The Death of Yugoslavia (1995), documentary
- Yugoslavia: The Avoidable War (1999), documentary
- The Weight of Chains (2010), documentary
- Generacija 71 (Generation 71) (2011), feature, animation

=== Ten-Day War in Slovenia (1991) ===
- Sivi kamion crvene boje (Red Coloured Grey Truck) (2004)
- Silent Sonata (2011)

=== Croatian War of Independence (1991–1995) ===
- Dezerter (1992)
- Say Why Have You Left Me (1993)
- Vukovar poste restante (1994)
- Premeditated Murder (1995)
- How the War Started on My Island (1997)
- Vracanje (1997)
- The Wounds (1998)
- Celestial Body (2000)
- Harrison's Flowers (2000)
- Witnesses (2003)
- Yu (2003)
- Mathilde (2004)
- Oluja nad Krajinom (Storm over Krajina) (2001), documentary
- Sinovci (2006)
- The Recollection Thief (2007)
- Will Not End Here (2008)
- Zapamtite Vukovar (2008)
- The Blacks (2009)
- The Ghosts of Medak Pocket (2011), documentary
- Vir (The Whirl) (2012)
- Number 55 (2014)
- The High Sun (2015)
- Oluja (film) (2023)

=== Bosnian War (1992–1995) ===
- Before the Rain (1994)
- Mizaldo, Kraj teatra (1994), documentary
- Underground (1995)
- Složna braća (1995), TV miniseries
- Ulysses' Gaze (1995)
- Pretty Village, Pretty Flame (1996)
- Welcome to Sarajevo (1997)
- The Perfect Circle (1997)
- Demons of War (1998)
- Savior (1998)
- Shot Through the Heart (1998)
- The Dagger (1999)
- Warriors (1999)
- No Man's Land (2001)
- Behind Enemy Lines (2002)
- Where Eskimos Live (2002)
- Fuse (2003)
- Life Is a Miracle (2004)
- Grbavica (2006)
- Nafaka (2006)
- The Fourth Man (2007)
- The Hunting Party (2007)
- Živi i mrtvi (2007)
- The Tour (2008)
- ZOS: Zone of Separation (2008), TV miniseries
- Sono stato Dio in Bosnia. Vita di un Mercenario (I was a God in Bosnia: Life of a Mercenary) (2010), documentary
- The Whistleblower (2010)
- A Town Betrayed (2011), documentary
- In the Land of Blood and Honey (2011)
- Neprijatelj (The Enemy) (2011)
- Sarajevo Ricochet (2011), documentary
- Circles (2013)
- Isteni műszak (Heavenly Shift) (2013)
- No One's Child (2014)
- So Hot Was the Cannon (2014)
- A Perfect Day (2015)
- L'Angelo di Sarajevo (2015), TV miniseries
- The Last Panthers (2015), TV series
- On the Milky Road (2016)
- Renegades (2017)
- Koridor 92 (2020), docudrama
- Te mračne noći (2021)

=== Kosovo War (1998–1999) ===
- The Valley (2000), documentary
- Guerreros (2002)
- Sniper 2 (2003)
- The Hunted (2003)
- Snipers Valley (2007)
- Stolen Kosovo (2008), TV documentary
- Kosovo: Can You Imagine? (2009), documentary
- My Beautiful Country (2012)
- Enclave (2015)
- Plani strategjik (2016), short
- The Balkan Line (2019)
- War stories from Košare (2019), TV docu-drama
- War stories from Paštrik (2019), TV docu-drama
- Dossier Kosovo ’98 (2022), TV docu-drama

==== NATO bombing of Yugoslavia (1999) ====
- Sky Hook (2000)
- War Live (2000)
- Falling in the Paradise (2004)
- California Dreamin' (2007)
- Niko nije rekao neću (2008), TV docu-drama
- Mamaroš (2013)
- The Sky Above Us (2015)
- The Load (2018)
- The Balkan Line (2019)
- Bauk (2024)
- 78 Days (2024)

== Transnistria War (1992) ==
- Carbon (2022)

== Civil war in Tajikistan (1992–1997) ==
- Mama (1998)
- Nikto, krome nas... (2008)
- A Quiet Outpost (2011)
- The Death of Innocents ("Марги бегунох" in Tajik) (2013)

== War in Abkhazia (1992–93) ==
- The Other Bank (2009)
- Konpliktis zona (Conflict Zone) (2009)
- Mandariinid (Tangerines) (2013)
- Corn Island (2014)
- House of Others (2016)

== First Chechen War (1994–1996) ==
(also see List of Chechen Wars films)

- Prisoner of the Mountains (1996)
- Damned and Forgotten (1997), documentary («Прокляты и забыты» in Russian)
- Purgatory (1997) («Чистилище» in Russian)
- Checkpoint (1998) («Блокпост» in Russian)
- Proof of Life (1998)
- Man's work (2001 TV series) («Мужская работа» in Russian)
- House of Fools (2002)
- The Storm Gate (2006 TV miniseries) («Грозовые ворота» in Russian)
- 12 (2007)

== Nepalese Civil War (1996-2006) ==
- Living Goddess (2008)
- Returned: Child Soldiers of Nepal's Maoist Army (2008)
- The Sari Soldiers (2008)
- Badhshala (2013)
- Uma (2013)
- Talakjung vs Tulke (2014)
- Kalo Pothi: The Black Hen (2015)
- Woda Number 6 (2015)
- Taandro (2016)
- White Sun (2016)

== East Timorese crisis (1999) ==
- Answered by Fire (2006) (TV)

== Second Chechen War (1999–2000) ==
(also see List of Chechen Wars films)

- War (2002)
- It is an honor («Честь имею» in Russian), miniseries (2004)
- Breakthrough («Прорыв» in Russian) (2006)
- Alexandra (2007)
- Captive (2008)
- Russian sacrifice («Русская жертва» in Russian) (2008)
- The Search (2014)
- Words of War (2025)

== Insurgency in the Republic of Macedonia (2001) ==
- How I Killed a Saint ("Како убив светец" in Macedonian) (2004)
- Bal-Can-Can (2005)

== See also ==
List of war films and TV specials
