= Dakota Fanning filmography =

Performances by American actress

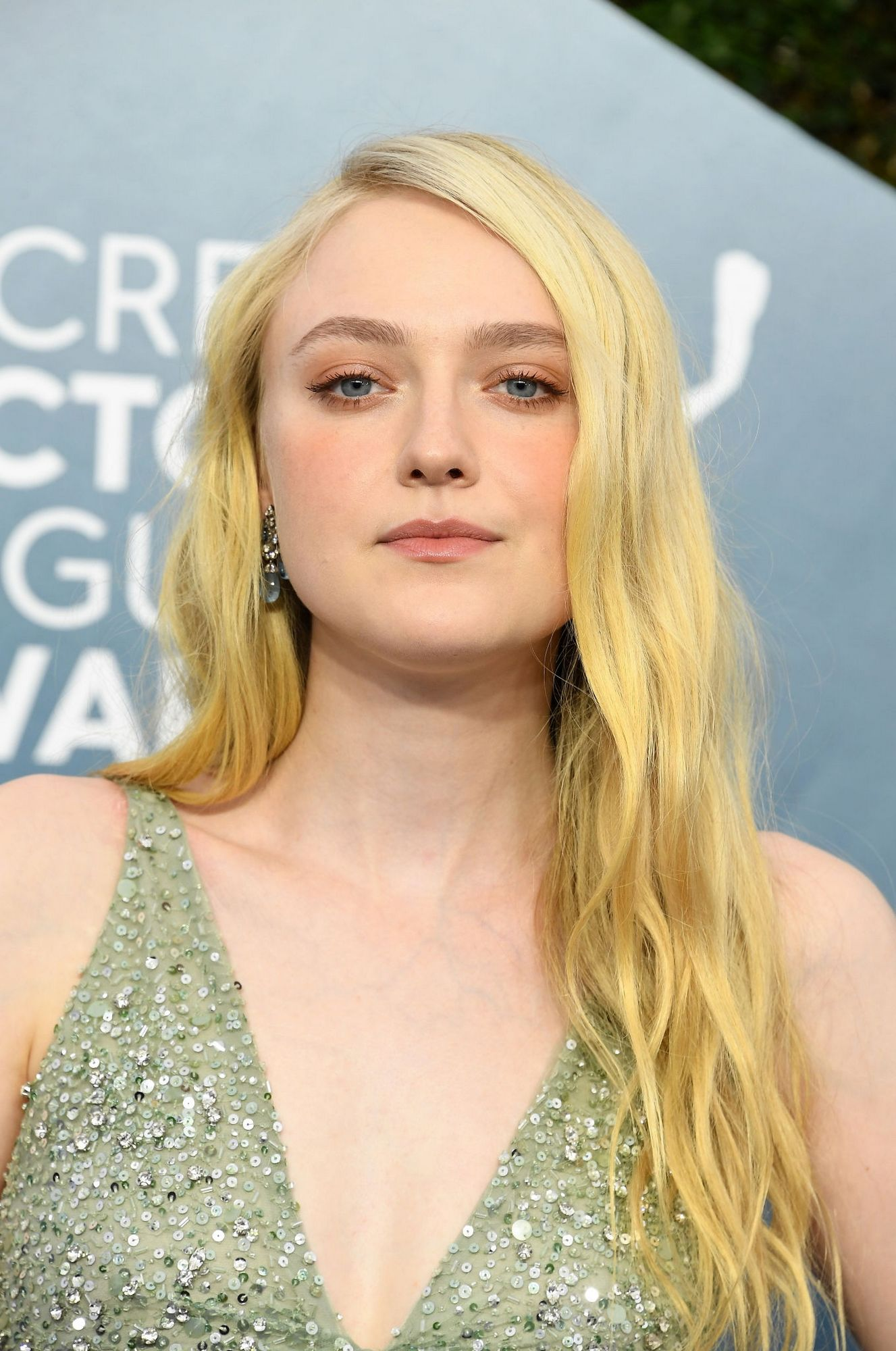
Fanning at the Screen Actors Guild Awards in 2020

This is the filmography of American actress Dakota Fanning.

== Film ==
Key
†	Denotes films that have not yet been released

Film roles
Year	Title	Role	Notes	Ref.
2001	Father Xmas	Clairee	Short film	
2001	Tomcats	Little Girl in Park		
2001	I Am Sam	Lucy Diamond Dawson		
2002	Trapped	Abigail "Abby" Jennings		
2002	Sweet Home Alabama	Young Melanie Carmichael		
2002	Hansel and Gretel	Katie		
2003	Uptown Girls	Lorraine "Ray" Schleine		
2003	The Cat in the Hat	Sally Walden		
2004	Man on Fire	Guadalupe "Lupita" (Pita) Ramos		
2004	My Neighbor Totoro	Satsuki Kusakabe	Voice role; English dub	
2004	In the Realms of the Unreal	Narrator	Voice role	
2005	Hide and Seek	Emily Callaway		
2005	Lilo & Stitch 2: Stitch Has a Glitch	Lilo Pelekai	Voice role; Direct-to-video film	
2005	Nine Lives	Maria		
2005	War of the Worlds	Rachel Ferrier		
2005	Dreamer	Cale Crane		
2006	Charlotte's Web	Fern Arable		
2007	Hounddog	Lewellen		
2007	Cutlass	Lacy	Short film	
2008	The Secret Life of Bees	Lily Owens		
2009	Coraline	Coraline Jones	Voice role	
2009	Push	Cassie Holmes		
2009	Winged Creatures	Anne Hagen		
2009	The Twilight Saga: New Moon	Jane Volturi		
2010	The Runaways	Cherie Currie		
2010	The Twilight Saga: Eclipse	Jane Volturi		
2012	The Twilight Saga: Breaking Dawn – Part 2	Jane Volturi		
2012	Celia	Hannah Jones	Short film	
2012	The Motel Life	Annie James		
2012	Now Is Good	Tessa Scott		
2013	Night Moves	Dena Brauer		
2013	The Last of Robin Hood	Beverly Aadland		
2013	Very Good Girls	Lilly Berger		
2014	Effie Gray	Euphemia "Effie" Gray		
2014	Every Secret Thing	Ronnie Fuller		
2014	Yellowbird	Delf	Voice role	
2015	The Benefactor	Olivia		
2016	Brimstone	Liz		
2016	American Pastoral	Meredith "Merry" Levov		
2016	The Escape	Lily	Short film	
2017	Zygote	Barklay	Short film	
2017	Please Stand By	Wendy		
2018	Ocean's 8	Penelope Stern		
2019	Once Upon a Time in Hollywood	Lynette "Squeaky" Fromme		
2019	Sweetness in the Belly	Lilly Mitchell Abdal		
2020	Viena and the Fantomes	Viena	Filming completed in 2014	
2023	The Equalizer 3	Emma Collins		
2024	The Watchers	Mina / Lucy		
2025	Vicious	Polly		
2026	The Sun Never Sets	Wendy	Also producer	
2027	The Nightingale †	Vianne Mauriac	Post-production; also producer	

== Television ==
Year	Title	Role	Notes	Ref.
2000	ER	Delia Chadsey	Episode: "The Fastest Year"	
2000	Ally McBeal	Ally (5 years old)	Episode: "The Musical, Almost"	
2000	Strong Medicine	Edie's Girl	Episode: "Misconceptions"	
2000	CSI: Crime Scene Investigation	Brenda Collins	Episode: "Blood Drops"	
2000	The Practice	Alessa Engel	Episode: "The Deal"	
2000	Spin City	Cindy	Episode: "Toy Story"	
2001	Malcolm in the Middle	Emily	Episode: "New Neighbors"	
2001	The Fighting Fitzgeralds	Marie	Episode: "Pilot"	
2001	Family Guy	Little Girl	Voice role; Episode: "To Love and Die in Dixie"	
2001	The Ellen Show	Young Ellen	Episode: "Missing the Bus"	
2002	Taken	Allie Keys	Main role; 10 episodes (6 episodes voice only)	
2003	Kim Possible: A Sitch in Time	Young Kim Possible	Voice role; television film	
2004	Justice League Unlimited	Young Wonder Woman	Voice role; Episode: "Kids' Stuff"	
2004	Friends	Mackenzie	Episode: "The One with Princess Consuela"	
2018–2020	The Alienist	Sara Howard	Main role; 18 episodes	
2019–2021	Gen:Lock	Miranda Worth	Voice role; 14 episodes	
2022	The First Lady	Susan Ford Bales	Main role; 7 episodes	
2024	Ripley	Marge Sherwood	Miniseries; 8 episodes	
2024	The Perfect Couple	Abby Winbury	Miniseries; 6 episodes	
2024	Mastermind: To Think Like a Killer	—N/a	Executive producer	
2025	Death in Apartment 603: What Happened to Ellen Greenberg?	—N/a	Executive producer	
2025	All Her Fault	Jenny Kaminski	Miniseries; 8 episodes	
2026	Margo's Got Money Troubles	—N/a	Executive producer	

== Video games ==
Year	Title	Role	Reference(s)
2009	Coraline: The Game	Coraline Jones	
