= Aravin =

Aravin is a surname of Russian origin.

Notable people with the surname include:

- Aleksandr Aravin (1958–2021), Russian director
- Aleksei Aravin (born 1986), Russian footballer
- Pytor Aravin (1908–1979), Russian historian
- Yuri Aravin (born 1941), Kazakh musicologist
