= The Fighting Lady =

1944 film by Edward Steichen

- Theatrical film poster
- Directed by: Edward Steichen
- Narrated by: Robert Taylor; Charles Boyer (French version only)
- Music by: Alfred Newman
- Production company: United States Navy
- Distributed by: 20th Century Fox
- Release date: December 21, 1944
- Running time: 61 minutes
- Country: United States
- Language: English
- Box office: $900,000

The full film

The Fighting Lady is a 1944 documentary film (billed as a "newsdrama") directed by Edward Steichen, produced by the U.S. Navy and narrated by Lt. Robert Taylor USNR. It is not to be confused with the 1954 war drama Men of the Fighting Lady, starring Van Johnson.

== Plot ==
The plot of the film revolves around the life of seamen on board an anonymous aircraft carrier. Because of war time restrictions, the name of the aircraft carrier was disguised as "the Fighting Lady", although she was later identified as USS Yorktown (CV-10). ("Fighting Lady" was the known moniker of the Yorktown, just as "Lady Lex" was for Lexington, "The Big E" for Enterprise, etc...) A few shots of aircraft landing were filmed aboard the Yorktown's sister ship USS Ticonderoga. During the filming of the movie, Yorktown was commanded by Captain (later Admiral) Joseph J. "Jocko" Clark. An uncredited Harry Morgan provides the voiceover for Clark.

Frequently mentioned is the adage that war is 99% waiting. The first half or so of the film is taken up with examining the mundane details of life on board the aircraft carrier as she sails through the Panama Canal and into the Pacific Ocean, finally seeing action at Marcus Island (attacked for three days from August 31, 1943). The film provides aerial views of a series of airstrikes at Japanese bases in the Pacific theatre.

Following an attack on Kwajalein in early 1944, intelligence reports that an armada of Japanese ships is massing near Truk, a major Japanese logistical base in the Carolines. The Fighting Lady and some of her task force are sent on a "hit and run" mission to neutralize it and return to Marcus, but not to attempt a landing.

Once the ship returns from the massive, two-day Truk raid, it is then sent to the waters off the Marianas and participates in the famous "Marianas Turkey Shoot".

At the very end some of the servicemen who appeared in the film are reintroduced to us, and the narrator informs us that they have died in battle.

== Production ==
The film uses Technicolor footage shot by "gun cameras" mounted directly on aircraft guns during combat. This gives a very realistic edge to the film, while the chronological following of the ship and crew mirror the experiences of the seamen who went from green recruits through the rigours of military life, battle, and, for some, death.

In his autobiography Baa Baa Black Sheep, U.S. Marine Corps ace pilot Gregory "Pappy" Boyington claims that the film briefly shows the small pit in which he and five other prisoners of war took cover during the Truk raid. Boyington had been captured by the Japanese and was being transported to a prison camp on the Truk islands when the raid began. Boyington writes that the prisoners, tied and blindfolded, were thrown from their transport plane during a hurried landing, and that one of their Japanese captors saved their lives by throwing them into the pit, where they survived without harm. According to Boyington, the film also shows a crater from a two-thousand pound bomb that landed just fifteen feet from the pit.

Due to her fighting heritage, and to honor all carrier sailors and airmen, the Yorktown is on permanent display at Patriots Point in Charleston, SC.

Alfred Newman's musical theme originally appeared in Vigil in the Night and was reused in Hell and High Water and in many 20th Century Fox film trailers.

== Reception and legacy ==
The Fighting Lady won the Academy Award for Best Documentary Feature at the 17th Academy Awards. The film was preserved by the Academy Film Archive in 2018.

== See also ==
- List of Allied propaganda films of World War II
