= List of Korean War films =

This is a list of feature films (excluding documentaries) either partially or wholly based on events in the Korean War, arranged by country of production.

== South Korea ==
- Piagol (피아골), 1955
- Beat Back (격퇴; 擊退), 1956
- Five Marines (오인의 해병), 1961
- The Marines Who Never Returned (돌아오지 않는 해병), 1963
- Red Scarf (빨간 마후라), 1963
- Flame in the Valley (산불), 1967
- Soldiers Without Fault (죄없는 병사들), 1989
- Nambugun (남부군), 1990
- Silver Stallion (은마는 오지 않는다), 1991
- Spring in My Hometown (아름다운 시절), 1998
- The Last Witness (흑수선), 2001
- Taegukgi: The Brotherhood of War (태극기 휘날리며), 2004
- Welcome to Dongmakgol (웰컴 투 동막골), 2005
- A Little Pond (작은 연못), 2009
- 71: Into the Fire (포화 속으로), 2010
- In Love and War (적과의 동침), 2011
- The Front Line (고지전), 2011
- Ode to My Father (국제시장), 2014
- Northern Limit Line (연평해전), 2015
- The Long Way Home (서부전선), 2015
- Operation Chromite (인천상륙작전), 2016
- Swing Kids (스윙키즈), 2018
- The Battle of Jangsari (장사리: 잊혀진 영웅들), 2019

== North Korea ==
- Unsung Heroes, 1978–1981
- Wolmi Island, 1982
- From 5 p.m. to 5 a.m., 1990
- An Unattached Unit, 1993
- 72 Hours, 2024

== United States ==
- The Steel Helmet, 1951
- Fixed Bayonets!, 1951
- A Yank in Korea, 1951
- Korea Patrol, 1951
- I Want You, 1951
- Tokyo File 212, 1951
- Submarine Command, 1951
- Japanese War Bride, 1952
- Mr. Walkie Talkie, 1952
- Retreat, Hell!, 1952
- One Minute to Zero, 1952
- Battle Zone, 1952
- Flat Top, 1952
- Battle Circus, 1953
- Flight Nurse, 1953
- Combat Squad, 1953
- Sabre Jet, 1953
- The Glory Brigade, 1953
- Mission Over Korea, 1953
- Sky Commando, 1953
- Take the High Ground!, 1953
- Cease Fire, 1953
- The Bamboo Prison, 1954
- Prisoner of War, 1954
- Dragonfly Squadron, 1954
- Men of the Fighting Lady, 1954
- The Bridges at Toko-Ri, 1954
- Love Is a Many-Splendored Thing, 1955
- Air Strike, 1955
- The McConnell Story, 1955
- Hell's Horizon, 1955
- Target Zero, 1955
- Hold Back the Night, 1956
- The Rack, 1956
- Men in War, 1957
- Battle Hymn, 1957
- Sayonara, 1957
- Time Limit, 1957
- Tank Battalion, 1958
- The Hunters, 1958
- Battle Flame, 1959
- Pork Chop Hill, 1959
- Operation Dames, 1959
- All the Young Men, 1960
- Cry for Happy, 1961
- Marines, Let's Go, 1961
- Sniper's Ridge, 1961
- The Manchurian Candidate, 1962
- The Nun and the Sergeant, 1962
- War Hunt, 1962
- The Hook, 1963
- War Is Hell, 1963
- The Young and The Brave, 1963
- Iron Angel, 1964
- No Man's Land, 1964
- Sergeant Ryker, 1968 (originally broadcast on television as "The Case Against Paul Ryker", a 1963 two-part episode of Kraft Suspense Theatre)
- M*A*S*H, 1970
- The Reluctant Heroes, 1971
- MacArthur, 1977
- Inchon 1981 (joint US-ROK production)
- For The Boys, 1991
- Devotion, 2022

== China ==
- Battle on Shangganling Mountain (上甘岭), 1956
- Heroic Sons and Daughters, 1964
- Power Fighter in Vast Sky, 1976
- Assembly, 2005
- My War, 2016
- The Sacrifice, 2020
- The Battle at Lake Changjin, 2021
- The Battle at Lake Changjin II, 2022
- Sniper, 2022
- The Volunteers: To the War, 2023
- The Volunteers: The Battle of Life and Death, 2024

== Philippines ==
- Korea, 1952

== Netherlands ==
- Field of honour (Het veld van eer), 1986 (Dutch/South Korean Co-Production)

== Turkey ==
- Ayla: The Daughter of War, 2017

== United Kingdom ==
- A Hill in Korea, 1956
- Queen and Country, 2014
