= Nikto, krome nas... =

Nikto, Krome Nas…
- Никто, кроме нас...
- Directed by: Sergey Govorukhin
- Written by: Sergey Govorukhin
- Release date: 2008

Nikto, Krome Nas… (Russian: Никто, кроме нас..., romanized: Nikto, krome nas..., lit. 'Nobody, but us...') is a 2008 Russian war film directed by Sergey Govorukhin. It depicts a romantic relationship between two people during the Russian intervention in the Tajikistani Civil War.

== Cast ==
- Sergey Shnyryov
- Sergey Makhovikov
- Mariya Mironova
- Yury Belyayev
- Rafael Akhmetshin
- Lyudmila Titova
- Sergey Sazontev
- Irina Brazgovka
- Anatoliy Belyy
- Vasili Gorbachyov
- Private Cheklin
- Anton Khabarov
- Kapitan Istratov
