= List of awards and nominations received by Dakota Fanning =

Dakota Fanning awards and nominations
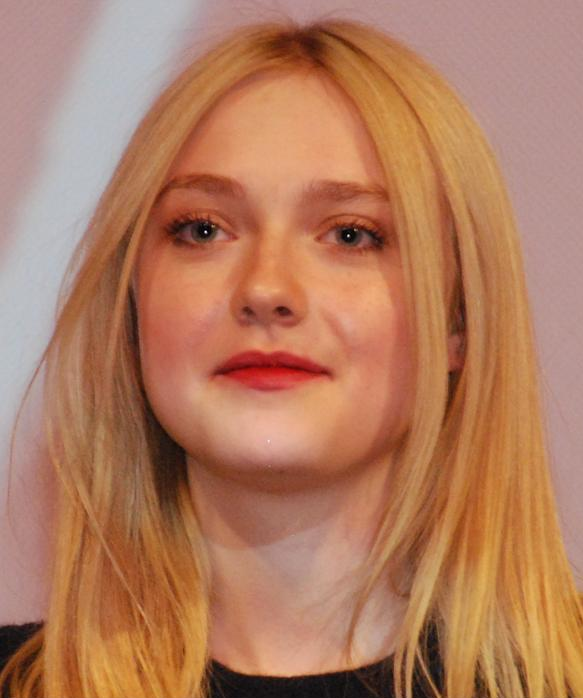
Awards and nominations
Award	Wins	Nominations
Actor Awards	0	2
Critics' Choice Awards	1	5
Emmy Awards	0	3
Golden Globe Awards	0	1

Totals (Note: Certain award groups do not simply award one winner. They acknowledge several different recipients, have runners-up, and have third place. Since this is a specific recognition and is different from losing an award, runner-up mentions are considered wins in this award tally. For simplification and to avoid errors, each award in this list has been presumed to have had a prior nomination.)
- Wins: 20
- Nominations: 40

This article is a list of awards and nominations received by Dakota Fanning

Dakota Fanning is an American actress known for her roles in film and television. She has earned various accolades including two Critics' Choice Awards as well as nominations for two Actor Awards, three Emmy Awards and a Golden Globe Award.

Fanning started her career as a child actress and received her breakthrough dramatic role in the drama film I Am Sam (2001) for which she earned the Critics' Choice Award for Best Young Performer as well as a nomination for the Actor Award for Outstanding Actress in a Supporting Role. She also starred in the Steven Spielberg directed dystopian disaster film War of the Worlds (2005), for which she earned her second Critics Choice Award. She earned further nominations for her roles in Charlotte's Web (2006) and The Secret Life of Bees (2008).

As a teenager she transitioned into dramatic roles such as in the Twilight film series (2009–2012). She appeared in Quentin Tarantino's cinematic revisionist epic Once Upon a Time in Hollywood (2019) and took leading roles in television shows such as Since 2018, she has held starring roles in the television series The Alienist (2018), The First Lady (2022), The Perfect Couple (2024), and The Watchers (2024).

She received critical acclaim as well as two Primetime Emmy Award nominations for Outstanding Supporting Actress in a Limited Series or Movie for her portrayals as an American expatriate in the Netflix psychological thriller miniseries Ripley (2025) and a concerned mother in the Peacock mystery miniseries All Her Fault (2026). As a producer, she received a News and Documentary Emmy Award nomination for the Hulu documentary Mastermind: To Think Like a Killer (2024).

== Major associations ==
=== Actor Awards ===
Year	Category	Nominated work	Result	Ref.
2001	Outstanding Actress in a Supporting Role	I Am Sam	Nominated	
2019	Outstanding Cast in a Motion Picture	Once Upon a Time in Hollywood	Nominated	

=== Critics' Choice Awards ===
Year	Category	Nominated work	Result	Ref.
Critics' Choice Movie Awards
2001	Best Young Performer	I Am Sam	Won	
2005	Best Young Actress	War of the Worlds	Won	
2006	Best Young Actress	Charlotte's Web	Nominated	
2008	Best Young Actress	The Secret Life of Bees	Nominated	
Critics' Choice Television Awards
2024	Best Supporting Actress in a Miniseries or Movie	Ripley	Nominated	

=== Emmy Awards ===
Year	Category	Nominated work	Result	Ref.
Primetime Emmy Awards
2024	Outstanding Supporting Actress in a Limited Series or Movie	Ripley	Nominated	
2026	Outstanding Supporting Actress in a Limited Series or Movie	All Her Fault	Nominated	
2026	Outstanding Comedy Series (as a producer)	Margo's Got Money Troubles	Nominated	
News and Documentary Emmy Awards
2025	Outstanding Crime and Justice Documentary (as a producer)	Mastermind: To Think Like a Killer	Nominated	

=== Golden Globe Awards ===
Year	Category	Nominated work	Result	Ref.
2024	Best Supporting Actress – Television	Ripley	Nominated	

== Awards and nominations ==
Year	Association	Category	Work	Result	Ref.
2002	Las Vegas Film Critics Society	Youth in Film	I Am Sam	Won	
2002	Satellite Awards	Outstanding New Talent	I Am Sam	Won	
2002	Chicago Film Critics Association	Most Promising Performer	I Am Sam	Won	
2002	Young Artist Awards	Best Young Actress in a Feature Film	I Am Sam	Won	
2003	Young Artist Awards	Best Young Actress in a TV Movie, Mini-Series or Special	Taken	Won	
2003	Saturn Awards	Best Supporting Actress in a Television Series	Taken	Nominated	
2004	Young Artist Awards	Best Young Actress in a Feature Film	The Cat in the Hat	Nominated	
2005	Young Artist Awards	Best Young Actress in a Feature Film	Man on Fire	Nominated	
2005	Gotham Awards	Best Ensemble Cast	Nine Lives	Nominated	
2005	Locarno International Film Festival	Best Actress	Nine Lives	Won	
2005	MTV Movie Awards	Best Frightened Performance	Hide and Seek	Won	
2005	Irish Film and Television Awards	Best International Actress	War of the Worlds	Nominated	
2006	MTV Movie Awards	Best Frightened Performance	War of the Worlds	Nominated	
2006	Saturn Awards	Best Performance by a Younger Actor	War of the Worlds	Won	
2006	National Association of Theatre Owners (ShoWest Award)	Actress of the Year	Herself	Won	
2006	Nickelodeon Kids' Choice Awards	Favorite Movie Actress	Dreamer	Nominated	
2006	Young Artist Awards	Best Young Actress in a Feature Film (Comedy or Drama)	Dreamer	Won	
2006	Fangoria Chainsaw Awards	Best Actress	Hide and Seek	Nominated	
2007	Young Artist Awards	Best Young Actress in a Feature Film	Charlotte's Web	Nominated	
2007	Nickelodeon Kids' Choice Awards	Favorite Movie Actress	Charlotte's Web	Won	
2008	Black Reel Awards	Best Ensemble Cast	The Secret Life of Bees	Nominated	
2008	Hollywood Film Festival	Cast year (Shared with cast)	The Secret Life of Bees	Won	
2009	Young Artist Awards	Best Young Actress in a Feature Film (Comedy or Drama)	The Secret Life of Bees	Won	
2009	Palm Springs International Film Festival	Rising Star Award	Herself	Won	
2010	Young Artist Awards	Best Young Actor/Actress in a Voice-Over Role	Coraline	Nominated	
2010	MTV Movie Awards	Best Kiss (shared with Kristen Stewart)	The Runaways	Nominated	
2010	Teen Choice Awards	Choice Movie Scene Stealer – Female	The Twilight Saga: New Moon	Nominated	
2013	National Arts Awards	Bell Family Foundation Young Artist Award	Herself	Won	
2018	Saturn Awards	Best Supporting Actress on Television	The Alienist	Nominated	
2018	Satellite Awards	Best Actress – Miniseries or Television Film	The Alienist	Nominated	
2019	Capri Hollywood International Film Festival	Best Ensemble Cast (shared with the cast)	Once Upon a Time in Hollywood	Won	
2024	Astra TV Awards	Best Supporting Actress in a Limited Series or TV Movie	Ripley	Nominated	
