= List of Chechen Wars films =

Below is an incomplete list of feature films, television films or television series which include events of the First Chechen War (1994–1996), the Dagestan incursions (1999), the Second Chechen War (1999–2009), the Insurgency in Ingushetia (2009–2017), the Insurgency in the North Caucasus (2009–2017). This list does not include documentaries, short films.

== 1990s ==
Year	Country	Main title (Alternative title)	Original title (Original script)	Director	Subject
1996	Russia; Kazakhstan	Prisoner of the Mountains	Кавказский пленник	Sergei Bodrov	Drama, War.
1997	Russia	Purgatory	Чистилище	Alexander Nevzorov	War. Battle of Grozny (1994–1995)
1997	Russia	War is Over. Please Forget...	Война окончена. Забудьте…	Valeriy Kharchenko	
1998	Russia	Checkpoint	Блокпост	Aleksandr Rogozhkin	Drama, Romance, War.

== 2000s ==
Year	Country	Main title (Alternative title)	Original title (Original script)	Director	Subject
2000	Russia	Tender Age	Нежный возраст	Sergei Solovyov	Drama.
2000	United States	Black Sea Raid		Jenö Hodi	Action, Drama.
2000	Russia	My darling star	Звёздочка моя ненаглядная	Sergey Mikaelyan	Drama.
2001	Russia	The Twelfth Autumn	Двенадцатая осень	Igor Talpa	Action, Drama.
2002	Russia; France	House of Fools	Дом дураков	Andrei Konchalovsky	Drama, Music, Romance, War.
2002	Russia	War	Война	Aleksei Balabanov	Action, Drama, War.
2002	Russia	Caucasian roulette	Кавказская рулетка	Fedor Popov	Drama, War.
2002	Russia	March of the Slav	Марш славянки	Natalya Pyankova	Drama.
2003	Germany; United States	Beyond Borders		Martin Campbell	Adventure, Drama, Romance, War.
2003	Russia	Antikiller 2: Antiterror	Антикиллер 2: Антитеррор	Egor Konchalovsky	Action, Crime.
2003	Russia	The Forced March	Марш-бросок	Nikolai Stambula	Action, Drama, Romance, War.
2004	Russia	My Step Brother Frankenstein	Мой сводный брат Франкенштейн	Valery Todorovsky	Drama.
2004	Russia	Countdown	Личный номер	Evgeny Lavrentiev	Action, Adventure, Crime, Thriller. Moscow theater hostage crisis
2005	Bulgaria	Target of Opportunity		Danny Lerner	Action, Drama.
2006	Russia	Dead field	Мёртвое поле	Aleksandr Aravin	Drama, War.
2006	United States; Russia	Spy Games: The Black Wolf Hunt	Шпионские игры: Охота на черного волка	Georgiy Gavrilov	Action.
2006	Russia	Break-through	Прорыв	Vitaliy Lukin	Drama, War. Battle for Height 776
2006	Russia	Moscow Mission	Обратный отсчёт	Vadim Shmelyov	Action.
2007	Russia	May	Май	Marat Rafikov; Ilya Rubinshteyn	Drama.
2007	Russia	12		Nikita Mikhalkov	Crime, Drama, Thriller.
2007	Georgia	The Russian Triangle	რუსული სამკუთხედი Русский треугольник	Aleko Tsabadze	Thriller.
2007	Russia; France	Alexandra	Александра	Alexander Sokurov	Drama, War.
2008	Norway	Night of the Wolf	Ulvenatten	Kjell Sundvall	Action, Drama, Thriller.
2008	Russia; Bulgaria	Captive	Пленный	Alexei Uchitel	Action, Drama.
2008	Russia	Russian victim	Русская жертва	Mikhail Dobrynin; Elena Lyapicheva; Irina Meletina	War. Battle for Height 776

== 2010s ==
Year	Country	Main title (Alternative title)	Original title (Original script)	Director	Subject
2010	Russia	Retired 2	Отставник 2	Andrey Shcherbinin	
2012	Germany	The Fourth State	Die vierte Macht	Dennis Gansel	Thriller.
2012	United Kingdom; Russia; Jordan	The Prisoner		Mohydeen Izzat Quandour	Drama, History, Thriller.
2013	United States	Extraction		Tony Giglio	Action, Thriller.
2013	Russia	Catharsis	Катарсис	Aleksandr Kondratenko	Drama, Thriller, War.
2013	Russia	Thirst	Жажда	Dmitriy Tyurin	Drama, War. Based on a novel Thirst.
2014	France; Georgia	The Search		Michel Hazanavicius	Drama, War.
2014	United States; Serbia	The November Man		Roger Donaldson	Action, Adventure, Crime, Mystery, Thriller. Based on the novel There Are No Spies.
2015	Russia	No Comment		Artyom Temnikov	Adventure.
2016	Russia	Simple story	Простая история	Victor Tatarsky	
2017	Russia	Closeness	Теснота	Kantemir Balagov	Drama.
2017	Germany; Belarus; Russia	Found a scythe on a stone	Нашла коса на камень	Anya Krays	Drama.
2017	Russia	Forgotten by God	Апостасия	Aleksey Muradov	Drama, Family, War.
2018	Russia	Liquidation decision	Решение о ликвидации	Alexander Aravin	Action. Elimination of Shamil Basayev
2018	Russia	Void	Пустота	Pavel Moskvin	Drama.
2019	Russia	The last trial	Последнее испытание	Alexey A. Petrukhin	Action, Drama, Romance. Moscow theater hostage crisis
2019	Russia	On the Dream's Shore	На берегу мечты	Bair Uladaev	

== 2020s ==
Year	Country	Main title (Alternative title)	Original title (Original script)	Director	Subject
2020	Russia; Estonia; United Kingdom; Italy	Conference	Конференция	Ivan Tverdovskiy	Drama. Moscow theater hostage crisis
2022	Russia	Golden Bronze	Золотая бронза	Igor Kopylov	Drama. Beslan school siege
2025	Germany; France; Serbia	Short Summer		Nastia Korkia	Drama.
2027	Russia	99th	99-й	Leonid Plyaskin	Drama, History, War. War in Dagestan (1999)

== Science fiction, fantasy and horror ==
Year	Country	Main title (Alternative title)	Original title (Original script)	Director	Subject
2000	Russia	Bastards	Выблядки	Oleg Mavromati	Drama, Horror.
2006	Russia	Alive	Живой	Alexander Veledinsky	Drama, Fantasy, Mystery, War.
2015	Japan	Harmony			Science fiction,

== Television series ==
Year	Country	Main title (Alternative title)	Original title (Original script)	Director	Subject
2000-6	Russia	Deadly Force	Убойная сила		Action, Comedy, Crime, Drama, Mystery.
2001	Russia	Men's work	Мужская работа	Tigran Keosayan	
2001	Russia	A special case	Особый случай	Igor Talpa	Action.
2002	Russia	My border	Моя граница	Andrei Rostotsky; Ivan Solovov	Action, Romance, War.
2002-3	Russia	Spetsnaz	Спецназ	Andrei Malyukov; Vyacheslav Nikiforov	Action, War.
2004	Russia; Kazakhstan	Gentlemen officers	Господа офицеры	Andrei Kravchuk	Action, Adventure, Drama.
2004	Russia	I have the honor!..	Честь имею!..	Victor Buturlin; Vladimir Bortko	War. Battle for Height 776
2005	Russia	Ataman	Атаман	Vasiliy Mishchenko	
2005	Russia	Carousel	Карусель	Vyacheslav Nikiforov	Drama.
2005	Russia	Secret Guard	Тайная стража	Yuriy Muzyka; Konstantin Smirnov	Crime.
2006	Russia	Jonik	Джоник	Dmitriy Tomashpolskiy	Drama.
2006	Russia	Storm Gate	Грозовые ворота	Andrei Malyukov	Drama, War.
2007	Russia	A matter of honor	Дело чести	Andrey Chernykh	
2008	Russia	12		Nikita Mikhalkov	Crime, Drama, Thriller, War.
2009	Russia	The cranes will scream	Откричат журавли	Evgeniy Serov	
2009	Russia	Landing mission	Десантура	Vitaly Vorobiev; Oleg Basilov	Action, History, War.
2011	Russia	Shooting Mountains	Стреляющие горы	Rustam Urazaev	War.
2011-12	Russia	SOBR	СОБР	Stanislav Mareev; Andrey Linich	Action.
2012	Russia	Brotherhood of the landing	Братство десанта	Armen Nazikyan	
2012	Russia	Shooter	Стрелок	Arman Gevorgyan	Action.
2012	Russia	The Swallow's Nest	Ласточкино гнездо	Dmitriy Tyurin	Drama.
2013	Russia	A matter of honor	Дело чести	Aleksey Chistikov	Action.
2015	Russia	Homeland	Родина	Pavel Lungin	Drama.
2018	Russia	Strelok-3. Hero's return	Стрелок-3. Возвращение героя	Mikhail Pogosov	
2019	Russia	Three Captains	Три капитана	Ilya Shekhotsov	Action, Mystery.
2020-6	Russia	Flashpoint	Горячая точка	Denis Karro	Crime, Drama, Mystery.
