= Men of the Fighting Lady =

1954 film by Andrew Marton

- Theatrical poster
- Directed by: Andrew Marton
- Written by: Harry A. Burns; Art Cohn
- Based on: The Forgotten Heroes of Korea; 1952 story in The Saturday Evening Post by James A. Michener
- Produced by: Henry Berman
- Starring: Van Johnson; Walter Pidgeon; Keenan Wynn; Dewey Martin; Frank Lovejoy
- Cinematography: George J. Folsey
- Edited by: Gene Ruggiero
- Music by: Miklós Rózsa
- Production company: Metro-Goldwyn-Mayer
- Distributed by: Metro-Goldwyn-Mayer
- Release date: May 7, 1954
- Running time: 79 minutes
- Country: United States
- Language: English
- Budget: $829,000
- Box office: $2,638,000

Men of the Fighting Lady is a 1954 American war drama film directed by Andrew Marton and starring Van Johnson, Walter Pidgeon, Louis Calhern and Keenan Wynn. The screenplay was written by U.S. Navy Commander Harry A. Burns, who had written a Saturday Evening Post article, "The Case of the Blinded Pilot", an account of a U.S. Navy pilot in the Korean War, who saves a blinded Navy pilot by talking him down to a successful landing. Men of the Fighting Lady was also inspired by another Saturday Evening Post article, "The Forgotten Heroes of Korea" by James A. Michener. The original music score was composed by Miklós Rózsa. It is also known as Panther Squadron. It is not to be confused with the 1944 documentary The Fighting Lady, which was mainly filmed aboard the USS Yorktown (CV-10).

== Plot ==
On board the aircraft carrier USS Oriskany in the Sea of Japan during the Korean War, author James A. Michener meets Commander and flight surgeon Kent Dowling. Dowling relates a "Christmas story" of a near-miracle.

Ensign Kenneth Schecter is one of VF 192 squadron pilots flying Grumman F9F Panther fighter-bombers who are repeatedly ordered to go back to destroy an enemy railroad that is rebuilt each time. Their leader, Lieutenant Commander Paul Grayson, begins flying lower and lower on each attack so as to improve the chance of doing serious damage, but veteran pilot Lieutenant Commander Ted Dodson criticizes him for risking their lives on the futile attacks.

Grayson is shot down during one mission and rescued safely from the sea, but, ironically, it is Dodson who loses his life on another mission when his damaged aircraft crashes and explodes on landing.

For their 27th mission against the enemy target, the squadron flies out on Christmas Day, and Schecter is hit by enemy fire and blinded. Lieutenant Thayer flies alongside Schecter and guides him by radio to a safe landing on the deck of the carrier. As a Christmas treat, the squadron is shown movies of their family members, including Dodson's and Schecter's. The squadron celebrates his safe return, but also mourns the loss of good men like Dodson. Later Schecter recovers his vision partially.

== Cast ==
- Van Johnson as Lieutenant (jg) Howard Thayer
- Walter Pidgeon as Commander Kent Dowling
- Louis Calhern as James A. Michener
- Dewey Martin as Ensign Kenneth Schechter
- Keenan Wynn as Lieutenant Commander Ted Dodson
- Frank Lovejoy as Lieutenant Commander Paul Grayson
- Robert Horton as Ensign Neil Conovan
- Bert Freed as Lieutenant (jg) Andrew Szymanski
- Lewis Martin as Commander Michael Coughlin
- George Cooper as Cyril Roberts
- Dick Simmons as Lieutenant Wayne Kimbrell
- Ann Baker as Mary, Schechter's fiancée

== Production ==
The use of color footage from actual combat operations gave Men of the Fighting Lady an air of authenticity.

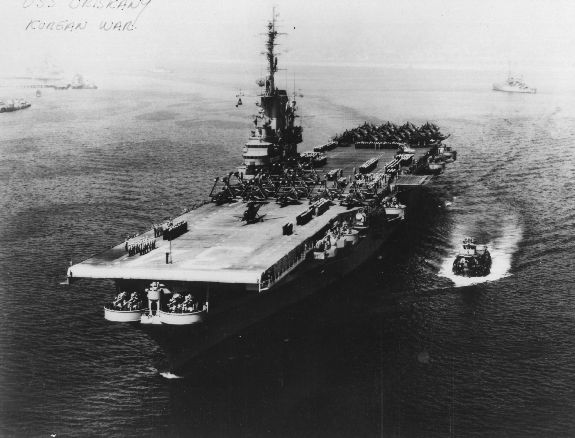
USS Oriskany during the Korean War

Men of the Fighting Lady was filmed aboard the aircraft carrier USS Oriskany with principal photography taking place from October 16 to November 10, 1953 at, and near San Diego, California. Stock footage of Korean War combat was also integrated into the live action sequences. The scene where Keenan Wynn's character is killed in a fiery crash landing on the carrier is actual footage of a F9F Panther accident during one of its early test flights. On June 23, 1951, United States Navy test pilot George Duncan hit an air pocket just before landing on USS Midway. The air pocket dropped most of the plane below the landing deck level, but he managed to keep the nose up above the deck at the time of impact, severing both wings and aft fuselage, and expelling the plane's cockpit and nose onto the carrier deck as a fireball erupted behind him. Except for burning his ears, Duncan survived the crash unharmed.

The climactic "Christmas Story" rescue was based on a real life event that occurred during the Korean War. On March 22, 1952, Douglas A-1 Skyraider pilot Lieutenant John Howard Thayer, from VF-194 based on USS Valley Forge, came to the aid of fellow squadron pilot Ensign Kenneth Schechter, who had been blinded by anti-aircraft fire. Thayer guided his friend to a safe landing at K-18, a U.S. Marine airfield.

== Reception ==
Due to its release shortly after the end of the Korean War, the Men of the Fighting Lady was well received by the general public as well as by critics as a mainly factual account of aerial combat. Bosley Crowther of The New York Times gave the film a very favorable review: "Men of the Fighting Lady, which came yesterday to the Globe, bearing a title that echoes a dandy factual film of World War II, turns out to be an apt successor to that saga of the aircraft carriers, translating now a stirring story of carrier planes and men in the Korean war."

According to MGM records, Men of the Fighting Lady made $1,502,000 in the U.S. and Canada and $1,136,000 in other countries, resulting in a profit of $729,000.

== See also ==
- The Bridges at Toko-Ri, released the same year
- List of Korean War films, for a comprehensive list of feature films and documentaries

== Sources ==
- Evans, Alun. Brassey's Guide to War Films. Dulles, Virginia: Potomac Books, 2000. ISBN 1-57488-263-5.
