= Sergey Govorukhin =

Russian film director, screenwriter, producer and writer

- Born: September 1, 1961; Kharkov, USSR
- Died: October 27, 2011 (aged 50); Moscow, Russia
- Occupations: Film director, writer, screenwriter
- Years active: 1988–2011

Sergey Stanislavovich Govorukhin (Russian: Серге́й Станисла́вович Говору́хин; September 1, 1961, in Kharkiv – October 27, 2011, in Moscow) was a Russian film director, screenwriter, producer and writer.

== Biography ==
Govorukhin was born on September 1, 1961, in Kharkov in the family of well-known director Stanislav Govorukhin and actress Yunona Kareva. He spent his childhood and adolescence in the city of Kazan. In 1988 he graduated from the scriptwriting faculty of VGIK. He worked as a welder, fitter, builder of the Far North and a superintendent.

From 1994 to 2005, as a war correspondent, he took part in the fighting on the territories of Tajikistan, Chechnya, Afghanistan and Yugoslavia. He participated in 20 combat and three special operations. He was awarded several military decorations.

In 1994 he started shooting a film about modern warfare in Russia. In February 1995 in Grozny, while returning from the shooting, he was shot by Chechen fighters, which led to the amputation of his leg. His first artistic and journalistic film Damned and Forgotten in collaboration with Inna Vaneeva.

In 1996 he created the Regional public organization of disabled veterans of inter-regional conflicts in Tajikistan and Chechnya. He held the post of chairman of the veterans and the disabled fund armed conflict Rokada.

He was a member of the Writers' Union and the Union of Cinematographers of Russia. Leader of the Film Company Epilogue. He was also a member of the Presidential Council for Civil Society Institutions and Human Rights.

Author collections of prose Footy Мainland, No Оone Вut Us..., With me or Without Мe, Transparent Forest Under Luxembourg, a number of publications in the national press and magazines.

== Death ==
He died on October 27, 2011, at the age of 50. The cause of death was a stroke, which after a few days left Govorukhin comatose. He was buried on October 29 Troyekurovskoye Cemetery in Moscow.

== Awards ==
- Order of Courage (1995)
- Medal "In Commemoration of the 850th Anniversary of Moscow" (1997)
- Medal "For Courage" (1998)
- Nika Award (1999) – for the best non-fiction film
- Prize of the Guild of Russian filmmakers (2008)
