= Father Xmas =

- Directed by: Marie Rose
- Written by: Marie Rose
- Starring: Dakota Fanning; Stephen Fanning
- Distributed by: American Film Institute
- Release date: 2001
- Running time: 20 minutes
- Country: United States
- Language: English

Father Xmas is a 2001 short film from director Marie Rose and the American Film Institute's Directing Workshop for Women starring Dakota Fanning in her debut as six-year-old Clairee who learns from her older brother (Stephen Fanning) that Santa Claus is not real and that their father is fighting in the Vietnam War.
