= Heroic Sons and Daughters =

Chinese film

- Directed by: Wu Zhaodi
- Written by: Wu Zhaodi; Mao Feng
- Based on: Reunion by Ba Jin
- Produced by: Sun Mingzhu
- Starring: Tian Fang; Zhou Wenbin; Liu Shangxian; Liu Shilong; Chu Dazhang
- Cinematography: Shu Xiaoyan
- Music by: Liu Chi
- Release date: 1964
- Running time: 110 minutes
- Country: China
- Language: Chinese

Heroic Sons and Daughters (simplified Chinese: 英雄儿女; traditional Chinese: 英雄兒女; pinyin: Yīngxióng Érnǚ) is a 1964 Chinese film about the Korean War, produced by Changchun Film Studio. It is based on a short story by Ba Jin.

== Plot ==
During the Korean War (known in China as the "War to Resist U.S. Aggression and Aid Korea"), Wang Cheng—a Volunteer Army soldier who had just returned to his unit from the hospital—requested permission to join the combat operations. To support his request, he presented a letter from his father, Wang Fubiao, for the Regimental Commander and Political Commissar Wang Wenqing to read. Eighteen years earlier, while engaged in underground revolutionary work in Shanghai, Wang Wenqing had entrusted his daughter, Wang Fang, to the care of an elderly worker named Wang Fubiao; he had subsequently lost contact with them. On his way to the front lines, Wang Cheng also encountered his younger sister—the cultural troupe member Wang Fang—before proceeding to take up his post on the unnamed hill. During an offensive by UN forces, Wang Cheng fought until he was the last man standing; shouting "Fire at my position!" into his radio handset, he then charged into the American ranks armed with a demolition charge, sacrificing his life to take the enemy down with him.

Following Wang Cheng's death, the Chinese People's Volunteer Army launched a campaign to "Learn from Wang Cheng." Wang Wenqing recognized Wang Fang as his own biological daughter but did not immediately reveal his identity to her; instead, he assisted her in completing her creative assignment—a work eulogizing Wang Cheng—and encouraged her to emulate Wang Cheng through her own actions. Later, while performing at the front lines, Wang Fang was wounded while shielding a field cook; she, too, became a hero. A local Korean family, braving U.S. Air Force bombing raids, crossed a frozen river to bring Wang Fang to safety. A month later, Wang Fubiao traveled to Korea on a慰问 mission; there, he revealed to Wang Fang that Wang Wenqing was her biological father, leading to a reunion between father and daughter.

== Cast ==
- Liu Shangxian as Wang Fang. At the time, she had just graduated from the Beijing Film Academy and was performing in the stage play Peking Man.
- Liu Shilong as Wang Cheng. He had previously played the role of a soldier in the film Dong Cunrui.
- Zhou Wenbin as Wang Fubiao, a worker from Shanghai. The most famous role he played was that of Fang Boqian in the film The Naval Battle of the Sino-Japanese War (Jiawu Fengyun).
- Tian Fang as Wang Wenqing (Wang Dong). At the time, Tian Fang served as the Deputy Director of the Film Bureau. His wife was the actress Yu Lan, and their son, Tian Zhuangzhuang, later became a renowned Chinese film director.
- Pu Ke as the elderly ethnic Korean man who helped rescue Wang Fang.
- Guo Zhenqing as the Regimental Commander.

== Production ==
The film is adapted from the short story Reunion by Ba Jin. In early 1952, during the Korean War, the renowned Chinese writer Ba Jin—at the behest of Cao Yu and Ding Ling—joined a creative delegation organized by the China Federation of Literary and Art Circles to visit the Korean front. The short story was published in 1961; it depicts a father and daughter who are reunited on the battlefield. Xia Yan, the then-Vice Minister of Culture, subsequently tasked the Changchun Film Studio with adapting the story into a feature film.

The film's storyline regarding the sacrifice of the character Wang Cheng is based on the deeds of Yang Gensi, a soldier who charged into enemy positions with a satchel charge in hand to launch a frontal assault. The historical prototype for the character who—finding the enemy lines too close—issued the command "Fire at my position!" is attributed to several individuals, including Jiang Qingquan, Yu Shuchang, and Zhao Xianyou, among others.

=== Historical Prototypes ===
There are three historical figures who served as the prototypes for the film's male protagonist, Wang Cheng. The first is Jiang Qingquan—a radio operator in the 201st Regiment, 67th Division, 23rd Army of the Chinese People's Volunteer Army—along with his comrades. In April 1953, during the Battle of Shixiandong North Hill in Korea, Jiang and his comrades were besieged by a formidable enemy force; he shouted into his radio handset, "Fire upon the roof of my bunker!" The second prototype is Yu Shuchang—a radio operator in the 217th Regiment, 73rd Division, 23rd Army of the Volunteer Army—and his comrades. On the evening of June 29, 1953, while positioned on an unnamed hillock on the front lines near Hill 281.2 in the Korean theater, Yu shouted: "The enemy is on top of my bunker! Open fire! Fire upon me! For the sake of victory, fire upon me!" He was killed in action shortly thereafter, having detonated a hand grenade. The third prototype is Yang Gensi, a "National Combat Hero" of the Chinese People's Liberation Army and a "Special-Class Hero" of the Chinese People's Volunteer Army.

The historical prototype for the female protagonist, Wang Fang, is Xie Xiumei, a member of the Cultural Work Troupe attached to the Political Department of the 202nd Division, 68th Army of the Volunteer Army. She remains the only female recipient of a "First-Class Merit Citation" within the Chinese People's Volunteer Army.

== Impact ==
During the Cultural Revolution, many films were subjected to criticism and banned from public screening. Ba Jin himself, along with his novella Reunion (Tuanyuan), came under fire for allegedly "sensationalizing the horrors of war, deliberately killing off the hero, and advocating pacifism"; however, the film managed to escape this fate—though the on-screen credit stating that it was "adapted from Ba Jin's novella" was removed. Consequently, Heroic Sons and Daughters—along with its theme song, "Ode to the Heroes"—became a household-name "Red Classic." It remains one of China's most renowned films depicting the Korean War.

During their downtime between training sessions, the "Yang Gensi Company" frequently organizes screenings of Heroic Sons and Daughters for its officers and soldiers. This tradition has endured for decades, and whenever the troops watch the film, they invariably identify the protagonist on screen with their own unit's namesake hero, Yang Gensi.
