= Aleksandr Aravin =

Russian actor, film director, and screenwriter (1958–2021)

- Born: 29 June 1958; Moscow, Russian SFSR, Soviet Union
- Died: 4 August 2021 (aged 63); Moscow, Russia
- Occupations: Actor; Film director Screenwriter

Aleksandr Aravin (Russian: Александр Львович Аравин; 29 June 1958 – 4 August 2021) was a Russian actor, film director, and screenwriter. He mainly directed police films.

== Biography ==
Aravin graduated from Bauman Moscow State Technical University in 1980 and retrained following the dissolution of the Soviet Union with the High Courses for Scriptwriters and Film Directors, studying under Alexander Kaidanovsky. He was a member of the Union of Cinematographers of the Russian Federation. His daughter, Aravina Anastasia, became a famous actress.

== Filmography ==
=== Director ===
- Tayga (TV series) (2002)
- Krasnaya kapella (2004)
- Kamenskaya (2005)
- Reshenie o likvidatsii (2018)

=== Screenwriter ===
- Po tu storonu volkov (2002)
