= Zhou Kexi =

Chinese translator

Zhou Kexi (Chinese: 周克希), born 1942, is a Chinese translator of French literature.

== Biography ==
=== Education ===
Zhou gained a degree in mathematics from Fudan University in Shanghai.

=== Translator of French literature ===
He acquired the French language and became interested in French literature while studying at École Normale Supérieure in Paris. He became a full-time literary editor in the 1980s, and has since then translated several French novels, including Alexandre Dumas' The Three Musketeers (1844), Gustave Flaubert's Madame Bovary (1857), and André Malraux's The Royal Way (1930).

He is currently making a new translation of Marcel Proust's In Search of Lost Time. The first volume, Du côté de chez Swann, was published in 2004.

He has also rendered Aventuras matemáticas (1987) by Spanish mathematician Miguel de Guzmán into Chinese.
