= Jean Duvignaud =

French novelist, sociologist and anthropologist (1921–2007)

Jean Duvignaud (22 February 1921 – 17 February 2007) was a French novelist, sociologist and anthropologist. He was born in La Rochelle, Charente-Maritime, on February 22, 1921.

Duvignaud was a secondary school teacher first at Abbeville, then at Étampes (1947–1956), where he taught Georges Perec. After submitting his doctoral thesis, he taught at the university of Tours. In 1972, he founded the magazine Cause commune with Perec and Paul Virilio. For a time he was in a relationship with Clara Malraux, the ex-wife of novelist André Malraux.

He died (aged 85) in La Rochelle on February 17, 2007.

== Bibliography ==
- L'Acteur, esquisse d'une sociologie du comédien, Paris, Gallimard, 1965. Rééd. L'Archipel, 1995
- Durkheim, sa vie, son œuvre, Paris, PUF, 1965
- Visites d'Atelier Marta Pan, Cimaise, N.87, Juin Spetembre 1968
- Sociologie du théâtre, Paris, PUF, 1965. Rééd. Quadrige, 1999
- Georges Gurvitch, symbolisme social et sociologie dynamique, Paris, Seghers, 1969
- Anthologie des sociologues français contemporains, Paris, PUF, 1970
- Spectacle et société, Paris, Denoël, 1970
- Introduction à la sociologie, Paris, Gallimard, 1971
- Sociologie de l'art, Paris, PUF, 1972
- L'Anomie, hérésie et subversion, Paris, Anthropos, 1973
- Le Langage perdu, essai sur la différence anthropologique, Paris, PUF, 1973
- Fêtes et civilisations, Paris, Weber, 1974
- Le Théâtre contemporain, culture et contre-culture, Paris, Larousse, 1974
- Le Ça perché, Paris, Stock, 1976
- Le Don du rien, essai d'anthropologie de la fête, Paris, Plon, 1977
- Le Jeu du jeu, Paris, Balland, 1980
- L' Or de la République, Paris, Gallimard, 1984
- Le Propre de l'homme, histoires du comique et de la dérision, Paris, Hachette, 1985
- La Solidarité, liens de sang et liens de raison, Paris, Fayard, 1986
- Chebika, étude sociologique, Paris, Gallimard, 1978. Rééd. Paris, Plon, 1990
- La Genèse des passions dans la vie sociale, Paris, PUF, 1990
- Dis l'Empereur, qu'as-tu fait de l'oiseau ?, Arles, Actes Sud, 1991
- Fêtes et civilisations; suivi de La fête aujourd'hui, Arles, Actes Sud, 1991
- Perec ou La cicatrice, Arles, Actes Sud, 1993
- Le singe patriote. Talma, un portrait imaginaire (novel), Arles, Actes Sud, 1993
- L'oubli ou La chute des corps, Arles, Actes Sud, 1995
- Le pandémonium du présent, idées sages, idées folles, Paris, Plon, 1998
- Le prix des choses sans prix, Arles, Actes Sud, 2001
- Les octos, béant aux choses futures, Arles, Actes Sud, 2003
- Le sous-texte, Arles, Actes Sud, 2005
- La ruse de vivre, état des lieux, Arles, Actes Sud, 2006
