= Man's Hope =

1937 novel by Amdré Malraux

Man's Hope (French: L'Espoir) is a 1937 novel by André Malraux based upon his experiences in the Spanish Civil War. It was translated into English and published during 1938 as Man's Hope. It deals with the Battle of Teruel, as well as the Battle of Madrid.

== Adaptation ==
The story was later adapted as a film, Espoir: Sierra de Teruel, produced by Edouard Corniglion-Molinier and released in 1945, though completed in 1939. It is considered a masterpiece by many European critics, such as Alexandre Astruc. However, the fascist (Francoist) government of Spain, and its allies, prohibited the film and attempted, unsuccessfully, to destroy all copies. In English the title has been translated as Days of Hope as well as by Man's Hope.
