= Espoir: Sierra de Teruel =

- Directed by: André Malraux; Boris Peskine
- Written by: Max Aub; André Malraux (novel: L'Espoir); Antonio del Amo
- Produced by: Roland Tual; Edouard Corniglion-Molinier
- Starring: Andrés Mejuto; Nicolás Rodríguez
- Cinematography: Louis Page
- Edited by: Georges Grace; André Malraux
- Music by: Darius Milhaud
- Distributed by: Lopert Pictures Corporation
- Release dates: 14 June 1945 (France); 26 June 1978 (Spain)
- Running time: 87 minutes
- Countries: Spain; France
- Language: Spanish
- Budget: ESP 9,144,820 (US $77,380)

Espoir: Sierra de Teruel (English title: Days of Hope or Man's Hope) is a 1938–45 Spanish-French black and white war film, directed by Boris Peskine and André Malraux. It was not commercially released until 1945. Malraux wrote the novel L'Espoir, or Man's Hope, published in 1937, which was basis for the film. The director won the 1945 Prix Louis Delluc award.

The crash of a Spanish Republican Air Force Potez 540 plane near Valdelinares inspired André Malraux to write the novel.

Different years are given for the film's completion. The novel was published in French in 1937 and in English in 1938. The film uses war footage from 1938 and was edited, and other scenes shot, during 1938–1939. It was finished in July 1939 and shown twice in Paris, but Francoist Spain applied pressure to censor it. All known copies were destroyed during World War II. A copy was found and the film was released again in 1945. In Spain, it was banned and was not screened until 1977, after the death of Franco.

== Plot ==
Spanish Republican forces fight against the better-equipped Nationalist armies in the desolate Sistema Ibérico mountains of the Province of Teruel in 1937.

== Cast ==
- Andrés Mejuto ... Captain Muñoz
- Nicolás Rodríguez ... García
- José Santpere/ Josep Santpere ... Commander Peña
- Julio Peña ... Attignies
- Pedro Codina ... Captain Schneider
- José María Lado ... Peasant
- José María Ovies ... Partisan
- José Telmo ... González
- Casimiro Hurtado ... Pilot
- Manolo González ... Mayor
- Juan de Dios Muñiz ... Pío
- José Ramón Giner ... Partisan who brings the arms
- Serafín Ferro ... Socialist pilot
- José Calle ... Mayor

== See also ==
- List of Spanish Civil War films
- List of war films
- List of Spanish films
