= Madeleine Malraux =

French pianist

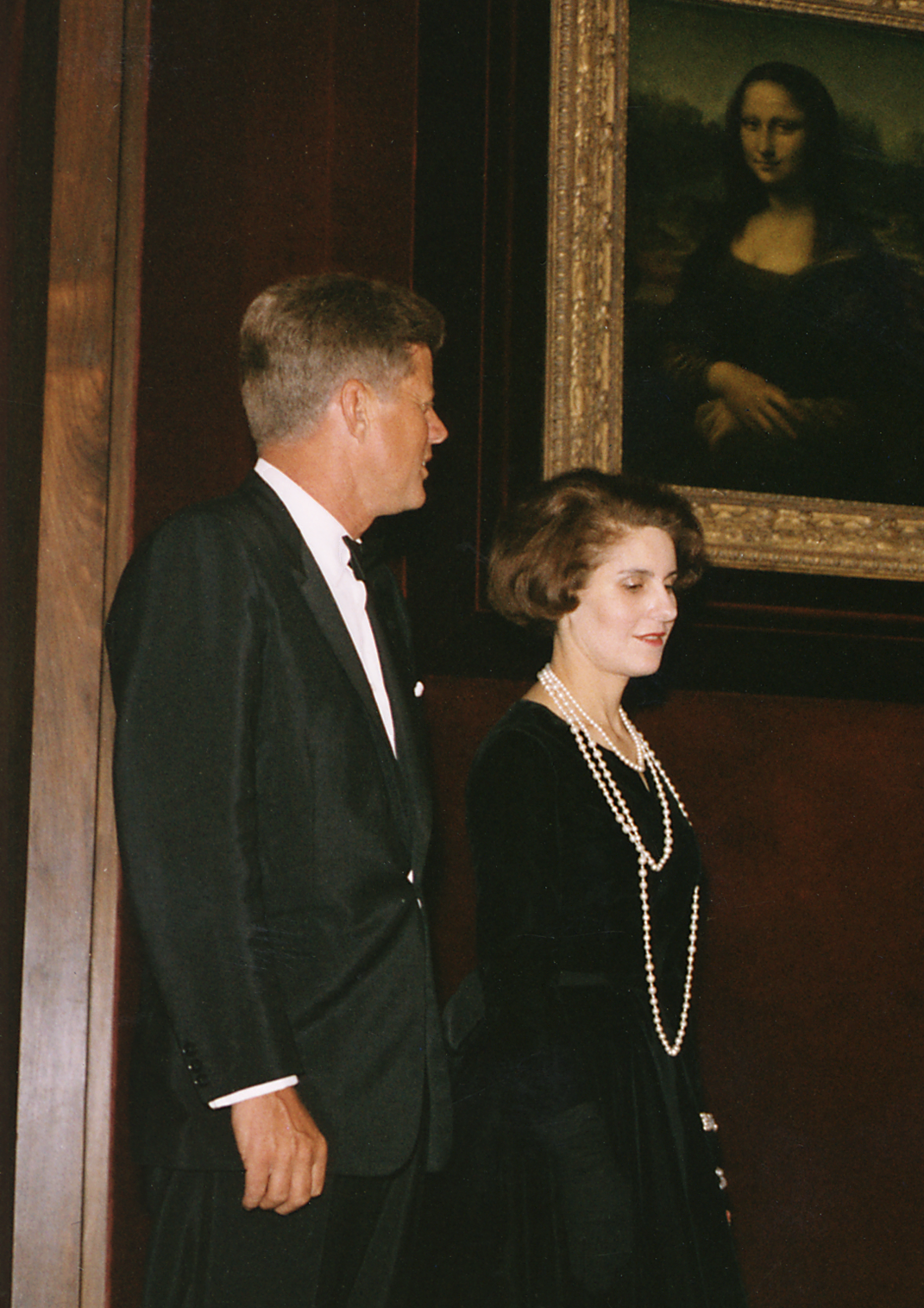
- Madeleine Malraux with John F. Kennedy in 1963.
- Born: 7 April 1914; Toulouse, France
- Died: 10 January 2014 (aged 99)
- Education: Conservatoire de Paris
- Occupations: Pianist; Piano teacher
- Awards: Officier of the Légion d'honneur

Madeleine Malraux, née Marie-Madeleine Lioux (7 April 1914 – 10 January 2014) was a French concert classical pianist.

== Biography ==
Marie-Madeleine Lioux was born in Toulouse, in a bourgeois family of industrialists, whose father was a music lover. She entered the class of Marguerite Long at the Conservatoire de Paris in 1928. She won a first prize, began a career as a piano teacher at the Toulouse Conservatory and gave concerts as a soloist.

On 8 January 1943, she married Roland Malraux, a journalist and half-brother of André Malraux. From their union was born on 11 June 1944, a son, Alain Malraux, who never knew his father. On 21 March 1944, Roland Malraux was arrested by the Gestapo in Brive-la-Gaillarde and deported to Neuengamme in Germany. He died during the bombardment of the ocean liner Cap Arcona by the RAF off Lübeck Bay on 3 May 1945.

It is during this same year 1943 that Madeleine Lioux met for the first time André Malraux at her parents' home and her then companion Josette Clotis. The future minister of General de Gaulle will not know the same fate as his half-brothers. Indeed, shortly before his arrest, Roland had introduced André Malraux to the head of the Footmann network, another network of the SOE: George Hiller. After he joined the Resistance under the name of Colonel Berger, André Malraux was in turn arrested by the Germans at Gramat on 22 July 1944. Transferred to the Saint-Michel jail of Toulouse, he was liberated by a coup de force from the Maquis on 19 August.

On 12 November of the same year, Josette Clotis, companion of André Malraux and mother of his two sons, Gauthier and Vincent, died in a railway accident. In 1945, Madeleine Lioux having returned to Paris and learned of the death of Roland Malraux. She then settled, with her son Alain, André Malraux and his sons, at 18bis avenue Robert-Schuman in Boulogne-Billancourt in a villa designed by Louis Faure-Dujarric. As pertains Clara Malraux who was still André's wife, she settled down, with their daughter Florence, at 17 rue Berthollet in the fifth arrondissement of Paris. Shortly afterwards, Malraux became General de Gaulle's Minister of Information. In 1946, Madeleine Lioux gave concerts at the La Pléiade art gallery directed by André Malraux. She played Erik Satie, then forgotten, and Benjamin Britten, who was not yet famous. On 13 March 1948, she married in Alsace in the strictest privacy André Malraux who had just divorced in 1947 from Clara Malraux. The couple was very close to the Fautrier with whom they often dined in the residence of the Vallée-aux-Loups in Châtenay-Malabry. Madeleine Malraux plays for the painter the composers he prefers: Chopin, Brahms and of course Satie. However, she is forced to put her career on hold because of her husband's responsibilities in government that require him to travel a lot. Madeleine will take care of the education of the three boys.

Remaining faithful to General de Gaulle during his desert crossing, Malraux abandoned his activities within the RPF and travelled in 1952 with his wife to Greece, Egypt, Iran and Iraq. In 1954, the couple was invited to New York for the inauguration of the new galleries of the Metropolitan Museum of Art. They spent their holidays in Italy, visiting Tuscany and Umbria. In 1956, they travelled with Alain to Rome and Sicily. In 1958, trips to Guadeloupe, Martinique, Guyana and, from 21 November to 15 December, Iran, India, Japan. In January 1959, Malraux became the Prime Minister of Culture of the nascent Fifth Republic. He travelled in August and September to South America, Argentina, Brazil, Chile, Peru, Uruguay, stayed at the Gritti Palace in Venice.

On 23 May 1961, André Malraux's two sons, Gauthier and Vincent, were killed in a car accident.

On 7 February 1962, an attack on their home in Boulogne-Billancourt forced the couple to settle down at La Lanterne in Versailles. During a period of great activity when, within the framework of her husband's ministerial activity, they met the personalities of the time, politicians, artists, scientists including Kennedy, Nehru, Mohammad Reza Pahlavi, Hirohito, Sartre, Mauriac, Picasso, Chagall, Stravinsky, etc.

In 1966, as their relationship deteriorated, the couple separated, and Madeleine Malraux moved to New York for part of the year where she resumed her concert career. She had known how to bring peace and serenity to the "great man" for twenty five years. The death of his sons, his political responsibilities transformed Malraux: he became irascible, carried away, brittle. To show his disapproval of this separation for which he held his minister responsible, General de Gaulle offered a gala dinner at the Élysée in honour of Madeleine Malraux.

In New York, where she now spends part of the year, she was part of a group of artists and personalities, among others cellist Isaac Stern, composer Igor Stravinsky, choreographer Balanchine and Jackie Kennedy.

Back in France, she gave a series of concerts, performing in public until the end of 2011 and playing Satie and Shostakovich again and still dating Florence Malraux, whom she loved very much.

== Selected discography ==
- CD (K 617019): her piano interpretations of works by Alexander Scriabin, Sergueï Rachmaninov, George Balanchine, Nicolas Nabokov, Arthur Lourié, Dmitri Shostakovitch, Sergueï Prokofiev, Igor Stravinsky.

== Publications ==
- L'univers farfelu d'André Malraux, 200 croquis d'André Malraux, Paris, Éditions du Chêne, 2009, 240 p., preface by Madeleine and Alain Malraux, introduction by Marie-Josèphe Guers.
- J'ai épousé mon beau-frère, in Paris Match, (9 February 2010), [interview by Karine Grunebaum].
- with Céline Malraux, Avec une légère intimité. Le concert d’une vie au cœur du siècle, Paris, Baker Street and Larousse, 2012 ISBN 978-2-03-586149-8.

== Distinctions and decorations ==
- First Prize of the Conservatoire de Paris
- chevalier de la Légion d'honneur in 1986
- officier de la Légion d'honneur (19 April 2010), decoration awarded rue de Valois by Minister of Culture Frédéric Mitterrand
- médaille grand argent de la ville de Paris (29 June 2011).
