= Man's Fate =

1933 novel by André Malraux

- Early Eng. trans. edition cover
- Author: André Malraux
- Original title: La Condition humaine
- Translator: Haakon Chevalier
- Language: French
- Genre: Novel
- Publisher: H. Smith and R. Haas
- Publication date: 1933 (Eng. trans. 1934)
- Publication place: France
- Pages: 360 pp (Eng. trans first edition, hardback)

Man's Fate (French: La Condition humaine, "The Human Condition") is a 1933 novel written by André Malraux about the failed communist insurrection and resultant massacre in Shanghai in 1927, and the existential quandaries facing a diverse group of people associated with the revolution. Along with Les Conquérants (1928 – "The Conquerors") and La Voie Royale (1930 – "The Royal Way"), it forms a trilogy on revolution in Asia.

The novel was translated into English twice, both translations appearing in 1934, one by Haakon Chevalier under the title Man's Fate, published by Harrison Smith & Robert Haas in New York and republished by Random House as part of their Modern Library from 1936 on, and the other by Alastair MacDonald under the title Storm in Shanghai, published by Methuen in London and republished, still by Methuen, in 1948 as Man's Estate, to become a Penguin pocket in 1961. Currently the Chevalier translation is the only one still in regular print.

In 1958 Hannah Arendt published The Human Condition, one of her central theoretical works, whose English name is identical to the French title of Malraux's book; to avoid confusion, Arendt's book was translated in French first as Condition de l’homme moderne (The Condition of the Modern Man), then as L'Humaine Condition.

== Plot summary ==
The action takes place during a 22-day period mostly in Shanghai, China, and concerns mainly the communist insurrectionists and others involved in the conflict. The novel's plot roughly follows the real-life communist takeover of (non-concession) Shanghai and the swift, murderous response to the uprising by Chiang Kai-shek's right Kuomintang. The four primary protagonists are Ch'en Ta Erh (whose name is spelled Tchen in the French original of the book), Kyoshi ("Kyo") Gisors, Katov, and Baron de Clappique. Their individual plights are intertwined throughout the book.

Ch'en Ta Erh, a young cadre, is sent to assassinate a Chinese businessman in order to gain access to a ship full of weapons for communist use. After some hesitation, he succeeds. Despite orders to the contrary from the Comintern, he becomes convinced that Chiang Kai-shek must be assassinated. Ch'en blames the failure of his first plot to materialize on lacking commitment, and attaches mystical significance to individualist fatality and murder. He resolves to kill Chiang in a suicide bombing. He succeeds in bombing Chiang's car on the eve of the crackdown, and commits suicide when the bomb fails to kill him, but it is later revealed that the attempt failed, as Chiang was not in the car.

Kyo Gisors, the half-French, half-Japanese son of a prominent professor, is the commander of the initial revolt, owing to his intellectuality and contact with Europeans in the concessions. As a communist, he believes that every person should choose his own meaning, rather than being governed by any external forces. He spends most of the story trying to keep power in the hands of the local workers rather than the Kuomintang, and resolving conflict with his unfaithful wife, May, who is anguished by Kyo's dangerous work. He is eventually captured, and refuses to inform on his comrades. In a final act of self-determination, he chooses to take his own life with cyanide.

Katov, a seasoned revolutionary, is a key ally of Kyo and a leader in the communist insurrection. He faced execution once before, during the Russian Civil War, but was saved at the last moment, which gives him a feeling of psychological immunity. After being captured and witnessing Kyo's death, he watches as communist prisoners are thrown into the chamber of a steam engine. He intends to use his own cyanide capsule and thus avoid the locomotive, but, upon seeing two young Chinese revolutionaries petrified by the prospect of a fiery death, he gives them the cyanide to split. He resigns himself with satisfaction to being burned alive by Kuomintang troops.

Baron de Clappique is a French merchant, smuggler, and obsessive gambler who describes himself as a mythomaniac. Through his myriad connections with the Shanghai business community and underworld, he ensures that the gun shipment which Ch'en killed for comes into the hands of the communists. Through his artifacts dealing, he is befriended with Kyo's aesthete father. He is later told by a contact that he, Kyo, and others implicated in the revolt will be killed unless they leaves the city in 48 hours. On the way to warn Kyo, Clappique begins gambling and cannot stop, leaving Kyo to be captured. He later escapes the city dressed as a sailor.

The stories of several other characters closely intertwine with the story. Old Gisors, Kyo's father, is a Marxist intellectual who is involved in Shanghai's French milieu and is a habitual opium-smoker. He disapproves of his son's work, and is shattered by his death. Ferral, a power-hungry and eminent businessman of the French Concession, is acquainted with Gisors and numbs his feelings of intellectual and sexual inferiority (particularly with regards to his sometime mistress, Valérie) through acts of hedonism and sadism. Hemmelrich, an impoverished Belgian phonograph-dealer, provides a safe haven to communist meetings; when his wife and child are killed by Kuomintang troops, he joins the fighting, and is one of few communists to escape death.

=== Characters ===
- Ch’en Ta Erh – the assassin, an individualist revolutionary, protagonist
- Kyoshi "Kyo" Gisors – the leader of the revolt, protagonist
- Baron de Clappique – a French merchant and smuggler, protagonist
- Old Gisors – Kyo's father, a one-time professor of sociology at the University of Peking (where he taught Ch’en), and an opium addict
- May Gisors – a Shanghai-born doctor and Kyo's wife, she is forthright regarding her marital infidelity and is anguished by Kyo's dangerous commitment to the cause.
- Katov – a Russian, one of the organizers of the insurrection, he is burned alive for treason.
- Hemmelrich – a luckless Belgian phonograph-dealer and socialist cadre
- Lu Yu Hsüan – his partner
- Kama – a Japanese painter, Old Gisors' brother-in-law
- Ferral – president of the French chamber of commerce and head of the Franco-Asiatic Consortium, an archetypal capitalist particularly troubled by his sexual relationships
- Valérie – Ferral's mistress
- König – the German-born chief of Chiang Kai-shek's police, who developed a burning hatred of communists from his service in the Russian White Army.
- Suan – a young Chinese terrorist who helped Ch’en, later arrested in the same attack in which Ch'en was killed
- Pei – another Chinese terrorist, an accomplice of Ch'en

== Awards and nominations ==
This book won the Prix Goncourt French literature award in 1933, and in 1999 was named number five in Le Monde's 100 Books of the Century. Since its publication, the novel has an estimated total sale (in French) of 5 million copies, all editions considered, placing the book as a bestseller in the history of the Prix Goncourt.

== Critical reception ==
The journalist Christopher Hitchens, while noting that Malraux had spent almost no time in China, claimed that the novel "pointed up the increasing weight of Asia in world affairs; it described epic moments of suffering and upheaval, in Shanghai especially (it was nearly filmed by Sergei Eisenstein); and it demonstrated a huge respect for Communism and for Communists while simultaneously evoking the tragedy of a revolution betrayed by Moscow." Malraux's biographer Olivier Todd quotes the novel as saying "It was neither true nor false but what was experienced," and remarks that Malraux's China itself was "neither true in its detail nor false overall, but it is nonetheless imaginary," and that it "cannot quite break clear of a conventional idea of China with coolies, bamboo shoots, opium smokers, destitutes, and prostitutes." A 1961 Penguin edition of the MacDonald translation claims on its back cover that Malraux had been "a member of the revolutionary committee" in Shanghai. This claim is false. According to Clara Malraux, André Malraux's wife, she and André did not visit China until 1931, around 4 years after the events depicted.

== Film adaptations ==
Four attempts have been made to adapt Man's Fate as a motion picture, but none came to fruition. The first involved Fred Zinnemann, who spent three years preparing his film version of Man's Fate before the producing studio, Metro-Goldwyn-Mayer, cancelled the production one week before filming was to begin in November 1969. Independent producer Sidney Beckerman hired Costa-Gavras to adapt the novel and direct in 1979, but the project was abandoned when the Ministry of Culture of the People's Republic of China denied permission to film in the country. The Italian director Bernardo Bertolucci proposed adapting the novel in the 1980s to the Chinese government; they preferred his alternative proposal, The Last Emperor, a 1987 biopic based on the life of the Chinese Emperor Puyi. In 2001, the American filmmaker Michael Cimino announced he would create a film version of Man's Fate but the project remained unrealized.

== Selected translations ==
The WorldCat listing for Man's Fate lists translations into at least seventeen languages.

- (Chinese) Li Yimin, Chen Jisheng, tr. 人的命运 Ren De Mingyun (Beijing: Zuojia Chubanshe, 1988) ISBN 9787506300674
- (Dutch) E. du Perron, tr. 'Het menselijk tekort' (De Wereldbibliotheek, 1934) - Dedicated to the translator
- (English) Haakon Chevalier. Man's Fate. (New York: Modern Library, 1934)
- (English) Alistair Macdonald, tr. Storm in Shanghai Methuen 1934 reissued as Man's Estate, 1948
- (Finnish) Juha Mannerkorpi, tr. Sielujen kapina [the rebellion of souls] (Helsinki: Tammi, 1947) ISBN 9513006530
- (Hebrew) Yitzhak Shenhar, tr. חיי אנוש Haye-Enosh : Roman. (Tel Aviv: Avraham Yosef Shtibel, 1935
- (Korean) 인간의조건 Ingan Chokon (Seoul: Hongsin Munhwasa, 2012) ISBN 9788970552156
- (Polish) Adam Wazyk, tr.. Dola Czlowiecza. (Wroclaw [u.a]: Zaklad Narodowy Im. Ossolinskich, 2001) ISBN 8304045729
- (Spanish) César A. Comet and Mario Vargas Llosa, tr. La Condición Humana. (Barcelona: Círculo de Lectores, 2001) ISBN 8422686821
- (Swedish) Axel Claëson, tr. Människans lott (Stockholm: Tiden, 1934)
- (Turkish) Ali Berktay, tr. Insanlik Durumu (Istanbul: Iletisim Yayinlari, 2003) ISBN 9750500296
- (Yiddish) Solomon Levadi, tr. דער גורל פון מענטשDer Goyrl Fun Mentsh. (Varshe: Yidishe universal-bibliotek, 2000)

== See also ==
- Shanghai massacre of 1927
- Chinese Civil War
- Le Monde's 100 Books of the Century
