= La Psychologie de l'Art =

Work of art history by André Malraux

La Psychologie de l'Art (The Psychology of Art) is a work of art history by André Malraux. The book offers an explication of Malraux's philosophy of art via the history of Western painting.

It was originally published in three volumes: The Imaginary Museum (1947); The Artistic Creation (1948); and Aftermath of the Absolute (1949). In 1953 a revised, single-volume edition was published as The Voices of Silence. Stuart Gilbert translated all four books into English.

In France, Malraux's works of art history were touchstones of their time and exerted a major influence on (for example) Jean-Luc Godard in his own work of critical art history, Histoire(s) du cinéma.
