= Clara Malraux =

French writer and translator

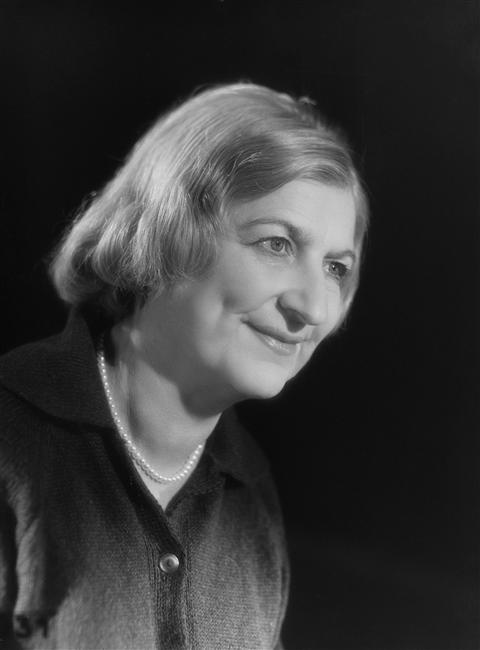
Clara Malraux

Clara Malraux (née Goldschmidt; 22 October 1897 – 15 December 1982) was a French writer and translator, and a member of the French Resistance during the Second World War. She was the first wife of the writer André Malraux.

== Early life ==
She was born Clara Goldschmidt, in Paris, and grew up in Auteuil. Her family were German Jews. Her parents were Otto Jakob Goldschmidt and his wife, the former Grete Heynemann; Clara had two brothers, André and Georges. Her father Otto died in 1910 and her mother committed suicide in 1938.

Clara Goldschmidt began translating work from the German language, some of which was published in a journal called L'Action. It was through this work that she met contemporary French writers such as Blaise Cendrars, Jean Cocteau, Louis Aragon and André Malraux, whom she married on 21 October 1921. They travelled widely in the early years of their marriage. In late 1923, arriving at Phnom Penh in Cambodia, they went hunting for antiquities, and were arrested, with André (who was several years younger than his wife) being given a prison sentence, which Clara managed to have overturned even though he lost his appeal on the grounds that the temple was "abandoned property".

In 1933, the couple had a daughter, whom they named Florence, but they were soon estranged and separated permanently in the late 1930s, though they did not divorce until 1947. André failed to support Clara's desire for a literary career, and in 1936 she followed him to Spain to take part in humanitarian activities linked to the Spanish Civil War. However, at around this time, Malraux also had an affair with another writer, Louise Lévêque de Vilmorin, and Clara had a relationship with a younger man. When André was awarded the 1933 Prix Goncourt for his novel La Condition Humaine, she did not attend the ceremony. Clara herself later claimed that she felt she barely knew her husband.

== Wartime and Resistance activities ==
After the fall of France in 1940, Clara and her daughter headed for the zone libre, where she joined the Resistance and took part in activities such as forging documents and trying to persuade German soldiers to desert. During this time she had an affair with another Resistance member, a German anti-Fascist named Gérard Krazat, who died at the hands of the Gestapo.

== Post-war career ==
After the war she returned to Paris, where she began her literary career in earnest, producing novels such as Portrait de Grisélidis (1945) and La Lutte inégale (1958). Her autobiography, Le Bruit de nos pas ("The Sound of Our Footsteps"), was published in six volumes between 1963 and 1979. She had a lengthy relationship with the writer Jean Duvignaud, who was nearly thirty years her junior, but they never lived together. They collaborated on a magazine called Contemporains.
