= Édouard Corniglion-Molinier =

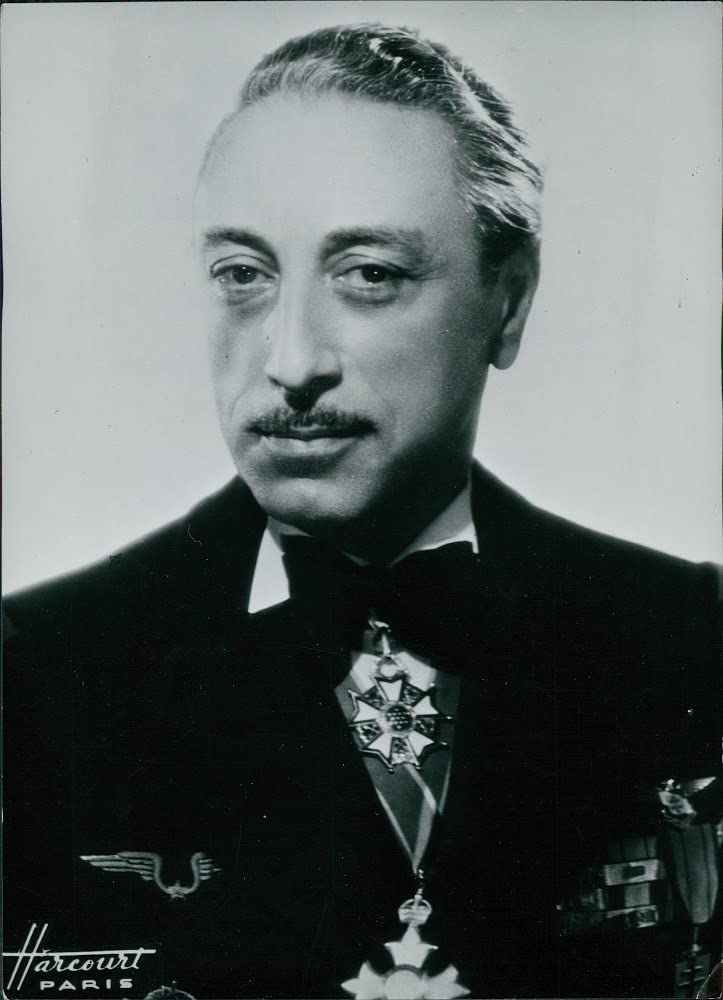
Édouard Corniglion Portrait

General Édouard Corniglion-Molinier (23 January 1898, in Nice, Alpes-Maritimes – 9 May 1963) was an aviator and member of the French Resistance, a member of the French government during the French Fourth Republic, and, in the 1930-1940s, a movie producer (André Malraux's L'Espoir also known as Man's Hope). He was a friend of Marcel Dassault and André Malraux.

== Biography ==
Corniglion-Molinier joined the French Army in 1915 at the age of 17, falsifying his age. He was trained at the Ambérieu flying school where he obtained his fighter pilot's license on 27 April 1916. He fought as a fighter pilot on the Italian Front, where he contracted malaria. In June 1918, he was transferred to the Western Front where he flew missions until the end of the war. He received seven citations, the Legion of Honor and numerous foreign decorations.

After the war, he studied at the university and became a Doctor of Law. In 1924, he married Raymonde Heudebert, a painter. In 1927, he bought the Victorine Studios in Nice and he became a film producer and a journalist for Paris-soir.

He also continued to fly in the interwar period. In spring 1934, together with his friend André Malraux , he embarked on a much publicized and dangerous expedition to find the lost capital of the Queen of Sheba, flying several weeks over the deserts in Saudi Arabia and Yemen, who were at war with each other.
In November 1936, he was the co-pilot of Jim Mollison in his last major record attempt to fly non-stop from Croydon to Cape Town, South Africa. The attempt ended with a forced landing some 160 km short of Cape Town.

At the beginning of the Spanish Civil War, he went to Spain with his friend André Malraux to help to organize the small Spanish Republican Air Force.

=== World War II ===
In September 1939, after the outbreak of World War II, he joined the French Airforce again. On 13 May 1940, he helped, at the head of his patrol, to shoot down a Henschel Hs 126 and on 16 May 1940, he shot down a Heinkel He 111.

He has two officially approved victories and he was one of only three pilots from the First World War, who added victories in 39–40 to their record from the previous war. The others were Lionel de Marmier and Marcel Haegelen who obtained, respectively, three and one aerial combat victories in 1940.

After the French defeat in June, he was demobilized on 16 August 1940. He joined the Resistance Movement Libération-sud led by Emmanuel d'Astier de La Vigerie and was taken prisoner in December 1940. Released on 7 January 1941, he managed to cross into Morocco. From there, he reached Martinique, from where he managed, by deceiving the surveillance of the Vichy navy, to reach New York.

On 1 March 1941, he joined the Free French Air Force (FAFL) in London. He led them into combat in the Middle East, where he was appointed Chief of staff and then Commander of the French air force in the Middle East. In 1941, he created the Lorraine and Alsace groups and participated with them in the Campaigns of Libya and Cyrenaica.

Designated to take command of the French air forces then in Great Britain in 1943, he took part in numerous missions over Germany and the occupied countries. He was appointed head of the Atlantic Air Forces in November 1944 and promoted to Air brigadier general in December of the same year. He was demobilized on 1 August 1946, after being appointed Air division general.

=== Political career ===
After the War, he entered politics and became a Minister of State in the Joseph Laniel government (1954), Minister of Public works in the second Edgar Faure government (1955–56), Minister of Justice in the Maurice Bourgès-Maunoury government (1957) and finally Minister for the Sahara in the Pierre Pflimlin government (1958). He was also French representative in the Council of Europe.

He died from heart failure in Paris on 9 May 1963 and he was buried in the Cimetière du Château in his native Nice.

== Producer ==
- 1936 : The Brighton Twins (Les Jumeaux de Brighton) directed by Claude Heymann
- 1937 : Southern Mail (Courrier sud) by Pierre Billon
- 1937 : Bizarre, Bizarre (Drôle de drame) by Marcel Carné
- 1938 : Mollenard by Robert Siodmak
- 1945 : Espoir: Sierra de Teruel by André Malraux
