= The Royal Way =

1930 novel by André Malraux

The Royal Way ("La Voie Royale", 1930; retranslated by Howard Curtis as The Way of the Kings, Hesperus Press, 2005) is an existentialist novel by André Malraux. It is about two nonconformist adventurers who travel on the "Royal Way" to Angkor in the Cambodian jungle. Their intention is to steal precious bas-relief sculptures from the temples. Along with Les Conquérants (1928), and Man's Fate (1933) it forms a trilogy on revolution in Asia.

== Plot summary ==
The locations are, at the beginning of the book, the ship from Marseille to Indochina and a brothel; later it is set in Cambodia, Laos, and Siam. The most important characters are young adventuresome Claude Vannec and an old experienced adventurer named Perken, a Dane with German associations. They relate to each other because of their nonconformism, which lets them collaborate to obtain their personal goals: the quest for the reliefs (for which they are motivated both archeologically and financially), as well as the search for a lost adventurer called Grabot.

They succeed in stealing the reliefs. But they are abandoned by their guide and in a dangerous jungle. Because they fear the government, they chose a way through the uncontrolled territory of the Moïs. This region is dangerous, too – but on the other hand Grabot is supposed to be there.

The adventurers have to defeat hostile vegetation and traps (e.g. swamps, giant insects, punji sticks). A deal is made with the Stiengs, but disintegrates as the adventurers find Grabot enslaved horribly. Now the adventurers are under siege. Perken, in a moment of lucidity and courage, manages to rescue the beleaguered ones.

The price he pays is an injury to his knee, which progresses to ulcerating inflammation of the joint (in a time before the invention of antibiotics, at a place without any opportunity to do a sterile amputation), and he dies slowly in pain.
