= Political Film Society Award for Human Rights =

American film award

The Political Film Society Award for Human Rights is presented annually by the Political Film Society to a film that explores the struggle for human rights in both fictional and non-fictional narratives. This award has been handed out by the Society since 1987. Depending on the number of films that qualify, as few as one film has been nominated for this award before, but as many as fourteen have been nominated in years past.

The film that first won this award was Matewan in 1987. The award, as with any other Political Film Society Award, can go to a mainstream film, an independent film, or even an international film.

In the following list of nominees and recipients of the Political Film Society Award for Human Rights, the winners are indicated in bold.

== 1980s ==
- **1987** **Matewan**
  - Project X
- **1988** **Cry Freedom**
  - The Accused
  - A World Apart
- **1989** **Mississippi Burning**
  - A Dry White Season
  - Listen to Me
  - Talk Radio

== 1990s ==
- **1990** **Driving Miss Daisy**
  - Glory
  - Longtime Companion
  - Quigley Down Under
  - Romero
- **1991** **Boyz n the Hood**
  - Come See the Paradise
  - Guilty by Suspicion
  - Jungle Fever
  - The Long Walk Home
- **1992** **The Power of One**
  - Europa, Europa
  - Sarafina!
  - School Ties
  - Thunderheart
- **1993** **Schindler's List**
  - Dragon: The Bruce Lee Story
  - Geronimo: An American Legend
  - In the Name of the Father
  - Indochine
  - Orlando
  - Philadelphia
- **1994** **Go Fish**
  - On Deadly Ground
- **1995** **Murder in the First**
  - Beyond Rangoon
  - Picture Bride
  - The Scarlet Letter
- **1996** **Ghosts of Mississippi**
  - The Crucible
  - Dead Man Walking
  - Get on the Bus
  - The People Vs. Larry Flynt
- **1997** **Rosewood**
  - L.A. Confidential
  - Midnight in the Garden of Good and Evil
  - Seven Years in Tibet
- **1998** **A Civil Action**
  - Enemy of the State
  - The Siege
  - Wilde
- **1999** **The Green Mile**
  - Boys Don't Cry
  - The General's Daughter
  - Hard
  - Naturally Native
  - One Man's Hero
  - Three Kings
  - Xiu Xiu

== 2000s ==
- **2000** **Remember the Titans**
  - Before Night Falls
  - But I'm a Cheerleader
  - The Contender
  - Erin Brockovich
  - The Hurricane
  - It All Starts Today
  - Sunshine
  - X-Men
- **2001** **Focus**
  - Atlantis: The Lost Empire
  - Born Under Libra
  - Bread and Roses
  - The Closet
  - Greenfingers
  - The Hidden Half
  - The Iron Ladies
  - Journey to the Sun
  - Lumumba
- **2002** **Ararat**
  - Das Experiment
  - Evelyn
  - The Grey Zone
  - John Q
  - Rabbit-Proof Fence
  - To End All Wars
  - Tricky Life
- **2003** **The Magdalene Sisters**
  - Amen.
  - Beyond Borders
  - The Dancer Upstairs
  - Dirty Pretty Things
  - The Life of David Gale
  - Lilja 4-Ever
  - The Sand Storm (aka Bawandar)
  - The Statement
  - X2: X-Men United
- **2004** **Hotel Rwanda**
  - Carandiru
  - The Gatekeeper
  - Imagining Argentina
  - Moolaadé
  - The Motorcycle Diaries
  - Osama
  - The Sea Inside
  - Two Brothers (2004 film)
  - Vera Drake
  - The Yes Men
- **2005** **North Country**
  - Caché
  - The Constant Gardener
  - God's Sandbox
  - The Great Raid
  - The Great Water
  - In My Country
  - Innocent Voices
  - Machuca
  - The Ninth Day
  - The War Within
- **2006** **The Last King of Scotland**
  - Babel
  - Blood Diamond
  - Cautiva
  - Glory Road
  - The Road to Guantanamo
  - Sophie Scholl – The Final Days
- **2007** **Amazing Grace**
  - Bamako
  - Beyond the Gates
  - Charlie Wilson's War
  - Holly
  - The Hunting Party
  - In the Valley of Elah
  - Persepolis
  - Rendition
  - September Dawn
  - Southland Tales
  - Offside
- **2008** **Milk**
  - Battle in Seattle
  - The Boy in the Striped Pyjamas
  - Changeling
  - Hunger
  - Miracle at St. Anna
- **2009** **District 9**
  - American Violet
  - Avatar
  - The Cove
  - Fifty Dead Men Walking
  - Invictus
  - Punctured Hope
  - Skin
  - The Stoning of Soraya M.
  - Storm
  - The Yes Men Fix the World

== 2010s ==
- **2010** **My Name Is Khan**
  - Blood Done Sign My Name
  - Eichmann
  - Formosa Betrayed
  - The Ghost Writer
  - Green Zone
  - John Rabe
  - Made in Dagenham
  - Princess Ka'iulani
  - Shake Hands with the Devil
- **2011** **The Help**
  - 5 Days of War
  - Amigo
  - City of Life and Death
  - The Conspirator
  - The Devil's Double
  - Elite Squad: The Enemy Within
  - The Flowers of War
  - In Darkness
  - Kinyarwanda
  - The Lady
  - Machine Gun Preacher
  - Oka!
  - Oranges and Sunshine
  - The Whistleblower
- **2012** **West of Thunder**
  - For Greater Glory
  - Mulberry Child
  - Red Tails
  - A Royal Affair
- **2013** **Zaytoun**
  - 12 Years a Slave
  - 42
  - The Butler
  - A Dark Truth
  - Out in the Dark
  - A River Changes Course
  - Wadjda
- **2014** **César Chávez**
  - Bhopal: A Prayer for Rain
  - Camp X-Ray
  - Coldwater
  - Devil's Knot
  - Difret
  - Free the Nipple
  - Giovanni's Island
  - The Imitation Game
  - The Monuments Men
  - Omar
  - Pride
  - The Railway Man
  - Rosewater
  - Siddhart
  - Unbroken
  - Walking with the Enemy
- **2015** **Suffragette**
  - Dukhtar
  - Freeheld
  - Labyrinth of Lies
  - Mustang
  - Noble
  - Son of Saul
  - Spotlight
  - The Danish Girl
  - The Stanford Prison Experiment
  - Stonewall
  - Straight Outta Compton
  - The 33
  - Timbuktu
  - Trumbo
  - Woman in Gold
- **2016** **Loving**
  - The Birth of a Nation
  - The Innocents
  - Race
  - Silence
- **2017** **Marshall**
  - 13 Minutes
  - Alone in Berlin
  - Battle of the Sexes
  - Bitter Harvest
  - Brimstone
  - Detroit
  - The Divine House
  - In Dubious Battle
  - LBJ
  - The Post
  - The Promise
  - Trafficked
  - A United Kingdom
  - The Zookeeper's Wife
- **2018** **BlacKkKlansman**
  - Boy Erased
  - 55 Steps
  - Freak Show
  - On the Basis of Sex
  - Sweet Country
- **2019**
  - Ashes in the Snow
  - At War
  - Brian Banks
  - Capernaum
  - Clemency
  - Dark Waters
  - Go for Broke
  - Harriet
  - I Do Not Care If We Go Down in History as Barbarians
  - The Invisibles
  - Just Mercy
  - The Report
  - Richard Jewell
  - Seberg
  - Skin
  - Saint Judy

== 2020s ==
- **2020**
  - The Banker
  - Burden
  - Sorry We Missed You
- **2021** Held for Ransom
  - American Traitor
  - Betrayed
  - Blue Bayou
  - Flee
  - Hive
  - The Last Forest
  - The Trial of the Chicago 7
  - Wife of a Spy
- **2022** Till
  - Argentina, 1985
  - Donbass
  - Emancipation
  - Holy Spider
  - Lingui, the Sacred Bond
  - Pursuit of Freedom
  - She Said
  - Unsilenced
- **2023** Killers of the Flower Moon
  - Aurora's Sunrise
  - Chevalier
  - La Cyndicaliste
  - Miranda's Victim
  - On Sacred Ground
  - Rustin
  - Sweetwater
  - The Wind and the Reckoning
  - Women Talking
- **2024**
  - I Am Gitmo
  - The Old Oak
  - One Life
- **2025** Nuremberg
  - Bau: An Artist at War
  - In the Fire of War
  - Lilly
  - Meeting with Pol Pot
  - No Other Land
  - An Officer and a Spy
  - Palestine 30
  - Shoshana
  - Words of War
  - The World Will Tremble

== See also ==
- Political Film Society Award for Democracy
- Political Film Society Award for Exposé
- Political Film Society Award for Peace
