= Political Film Society Award for Exposé =

The Political Film Society Award for Exposé is given out each year by the Political Film Society to a film that has an investigative depth into a subject matter and often exposes surprising information on the subject. This award has been handed out by the Society since 1988. Depending on the number of films that qualify, as few as one films has been nominated for this award before but as many as fourteen have been nominated in years past.

The film that first won this award was A Cry in the Dark in 1988. The award, as with any other Political Film Society Award, can go to a mainstream film, independent film, or even an international film.

In the following list of nominees and recipients of the Political Film Society Award for Exposé, the winners are indicated in bold.

== 1980s ==
- **1988** **A Cry in the Dark**
  - The Milagro Beanfield War
  - Patty Hearst
- **1989** **Scandal**
  - Blaze

== 1990s ==
- **1990** **Roger & Me**
  - Air America
  - Reversal of Fortune
  - Romero
- **1991** **Guilty by Suspicion**
  - Boyz n the Hood
  - JFK
  - Paris Is Burning
- **1992** **Hoffa**
  - Malcolm X
  - Thunderheart
- **1993** **In the Name of the Father**
  - Rising Sun
  - Schindler's List
  - Short Cuts
- **1994** **Quiz Show**
- **1995** **Nixon**
  - Beyond Rangoon
  - Panther
- **1996** **Dead Man Walking**
  - The People vs. Larry Flynt
- **1997** **Rosewood**
  - Amistad
  - The Peacemaker
  - Seven Years in Tibet
- **1998**
  - Bulworth
  - A Civil Action
  - Four Days in September
  - Regeneration
- **1999** **Boys Don't Cry**
  - Bastards
  - Cabaret Balkan
  - East of Hope Street
  - The Insider
  - Naturally Native
  - One Man's Hero
  - Three Kings
  - Three Seasons

== 2000s ==
- **2000** **Before Night Falls**
  - But I'm a Cheerleader
  - Catfish in Black Bean Sauce
  - Erin Brockovich
  - From the Edge of the City
  - The Hurricane
  - It All Starts Today
  - Luminarias
  - Remember the Titans
  - Steal This Movie!
  - Thirteen Days
  - Tigerland
  - Titanic Town
  - Traffic
  - X-Men
- **2001** **Uprising**
  - Ali
  - Baby Boy
  - Behind Enemy Lines
  - Born under Libra
  - Bread and Roses
  - Greenfingers
  - The Hidden Half
  - The Iron Ladies
  - Journey to the Sun
  - Lumumba
  - Our Lady of the Assassins
- **2002** **Antwone Fisher**
  - Ararat
  - Circuit
  - Enigma
  - Evelyn
  - Green Dragon
  - The Grey Zone
  - John Q.
  - K-19: The Widowmaker
  - Kandahar
  - Max
  - Rabbit-Proof Fence
  - To End All Wars
  - Tricky Life
  - Y tu mamá también
- **2003** **Veronica Guerin**
  - All My Loved Ones
  - Amen.
  - Beyond Borders
  - La Casa de Los Babys
  - Dark Blue
  - The Dancer Upstairs
  - Dirty Pretty Things
  - Emerald Cowboy
  - Green Card Fever
  - Herod's Law
  - Lilja 4-ever
  - The Magdalene Sisters
  - Marooned in Iraq
  - Runaway Jury
  - Sandstorm
  - Shattered Glass
  - The Statement
  - Taking Sides
  - Tycoon: A New Russian
- **2004** **Kinsey**
  - Carandiru
  - The Day After Tomorrow
  - The Gatekeeper
  - Hotel Rwanda
  - Imagining Argentina
  - The Motorcycle Diaries
  - Osama
  - Rosenstrasse
  - Taegukgi
  - The Yes Men
- **2005** **Good Night, and Good Luck**
  - Before the Fall
  - Crash
  - Downfall
  - The Great Water
  - Voces inocentes
  - Lord of War
  - Machuca
  - Munich
  - The Ninth Day
  - North Country
  - Paradise Now
  - Turtles Can Fly
- **2006** **Kekexili: Mountain Patrol**
  - Cautiva
  - Fast Food Nation
  - Glory Road
  - The Good Shepherd
  - The Listening
  - The Queen
  - The Road to Guantánamo
  - Sophie Scholl – The Final Days
- **2007** **American Gangster**
  - Amu
  - Bamako
  - Beyond the Gates
  - Black Book
  - Black Friday
  - Charlie Wilson's War
  - The Great Debaters
  - Holly
  - The Hunting Party
  - A Mighty Heart
  - Persepolis
  - Redacted
  - September Dawn
  - The Situation
  - There Will Be Blood
  - Trade
  - The Wind That Shakes the Barley
- **2008**
  - The Bank Job
  - Battle in Seattle
  - Changeling
  - Che
  - The Counterfeiters
  - Defiance
  - Frost/Nixon
  - Milk
  - Miracle at St. Anna
  - Still Life
  - W.
  - Walkyrie
- **2009** **Fifty Dead Men Walking**
  - 12
  - The Baader Meinhof Complex
  - The Cove
  - Flame & Citron
  - The Hurt Locker
  - Invictus
  - The Last Station
  - Punctured Hope
  - Sin Nombre
  - Skin
  - State of Play
  - Storm
  - The Stoning of Soraya M.
  - The Sun
  - The Yes Men Fix the World
  - The Young Victoria

== 2010s ==
- **2010** **Shake Hands with the Devil**
  - Agora
  - Casino Jack
  - Extraordinary Measures
  - Fair Game
  - Formosa Betrayed
  - John Rabe
  - Mao's Last Dancer
  - Princess Ka`iulani
  - Vincere
- **2011** **Silenced (aka The Crucible)**
  - 5 Days of War
  - Amigo
  - The Bang Bang Club
  - City of Life and Death
  - The Conquest
  - The Conspirator
  - The Devil's Double
  - Elite Squad 2: The Enemy Within
  - J. Edgar
  - Kinyarwanda
  - Machine Gun Preacher
  - Oranges and Sunshine
  - The Whistleblower
- **2012** **Argo**
  - Compliance
  - For Greater Glory
  - Lula, Son of Brazil
  - Mulberry Child
- **2013** **Emperor**
  - Aftermath
  - Dallas Buyers Club
  - A Dark Truth
  - The Fifth Estate
  - The Reluctant Fundamentalist
  - Saving Lincoln
- **2014** **Difret**
  - Bethlehem
  - Bhopal: A Prayer for Rain
  - Cesar Chavez
  - Coldwater
  - Giovanni's Island
  - The Imitation Game
  - Kill the Messenger
  - The Last Sentence
  - The Monuments Men
  - Omar
  - Pride
  - The Railway Man
  - Rosewater
  - Siddhart
  - Walking with the Enemy
- **2015** **Experimenter**
  - Bridge of Spies
  - Heneral Luna
  - Jimmy's Hall
  - Labyrinth of Lies
  - Midterranea
  - Noble
  - Spotlight
  - Straight Outta Compton
  - The Danish Girl
  - The Girl King
  - Trumbo
  - Truth
  - Woman in Gold
- **2016** **War Dogs**
  - Denial
  - Free State of Jones
  - I, Daniel Blake
  - The Innocents
  - Land of Mine
  - The People v Fritz Bauer
  - Race
  - The Siege of Jadoville
  - Silence
  - Snowden
  - Tanna
- **2017** **War Machine**
  - 15 Minutes
  - All the Money in the World
  - Alone in Berlin
  - Bitter Harvest
  - Darkest House
  - Detroit
  - The Divine Hour
  - The King's Choice
  - Mark Felt: The Man Who Brought Down the White House
  - Marshall
  - The Pirates of Somalia
  - The Post
  - Tickling Giants
  - Tom of Finland
  - A United Kingdom
  - Victoria & Abdul
  - The Zookeeper's Wife
- **2018** **Boy Erased**
  - BlacKkKlansman
  - Chappaquiddick
  - 55 Steps
  - The Front Runner
  - Green Book
  - On the Basis of Sex
  - Outlaw King
  - 22 July
  - Vice
  - The Young Karl Marx
- **2019** **15 Minutes of War** and **The Invisibles**
  - Ashes in the Snow
  - Brian Banks
  - Capernaum
  - Dark Waters
  - Go for Broke
  - Harriet
  - I Do Not Care If We Go Down in History as Barbarians
  - The Innocent
  - Just Mercy
  - Mob Town
  - Official Secrets
  - Red Joan
  - The Report
  - Richard Jewell
  - Seberg
  - Skin
  - Saint Judy
  - The Two Popes

== 2020s ==
- **2020**
  - The Banker
  - Burden
  - Sorry We Missed You
- **2021** Wife of a Spy
  - American Traitor
  - Betrayed
  - Blue Bayou
  - The Courier
  - De Gaulle
  - Held for Ransom
  - Hive
  - The Last Duel
  - The Last Forest
  - Margrete: Queen of the North
  - Operation Curveball
  - Peepal Tree
  - The Last Duel
  - The Rescue
- **2022** She Said
  - Donbass
  - Emancipation
  - Holy Spider
  - Operation Mincemeat
  - Unsilenced
- **2023** Chevalier
  - Aurora's Sunrise
  - The Burial
  - Golda
  - Killers of the Flower Moon
  - La Cyndicaliste
  - On Sacred Ground
  - Oppenheimer
  - Rustin
  - Sweetwater
  - The Wind and the Reckoning
  - Women Talking
- **2024** The Apprentice
  - Bonhoeffer
  - I Am Gitmo
  - Kidnapped
  - One Life
- **2025** In the Fire of War
  - Bau: An Artist at War
  - Lilly
  - Meeting with Pol Pot
  - No Other Land
  - Nuremberg
  - Palestine 30
  - Shoshana
  - Words of War
  - The World Will Tremble

== See also ==
- Political Film Society Award for Democracy
- Political Film Society Award for Human Rights
- Political Film Society Award for Peace
