= Political Film Society Award for Peace =

American film award

The Political Film Society Award for Peace is awarded annually by the Political Film Society Award to a film that deals with the struggle for peace in both fictional and non-fictional stories. The award has been made by the Society since 1987. The number of films nominated depends on the number of movies that qualify, and has been as low as one and as high as fourteen.

The first recipient was Platoon in 1987. The award, as with any other Political Film Society Award, can go to a mainstream, independent or international film. The Political Film Society looks at a broad selection of movies before it nominates them.

In the following list of nominees and winners of the Political Film Society Award for Peace, the winners are indicated in bold.

== 1980s ==
- **1987 Platoon**
  - Gardens of Stone
- **1988 Good Morning, Vietnam**
  - 1969
- **1989 Casualties of War**
  - Do the Right Thing
  - Fat Man and Little Boy

== 1990s ==
- **1990 Dances with Wolves**
  - Dreams Come True
- **1991 Boyz n the Hood**
  - JFK
- **1992 Grand Canyon**
  - The Last of the Mohicans
  - Mr. Saturday Night
- **1993 Heaven and Earth**
  - In the Name of the Father
- **1994 The War**
- **1995 Beyond Rangoon**
  - Murder in the First
  - Picture Bride
  - The Scarlet Letter
- **1996 Michael Collins**
- **1997 Seven Years in Tibet**
- **1998 Savior**
  - American History X
  - The Boxer
  - Men with Guns
  - Regeneration
  - Saving Private Ryan
  - The Thin Red Line
- **1999 Three Kings**
  - Cabaret Balkan
  - Earth
  - Light It Up
  - One Man's Hero
  - West Beirut

== 2000s ==
- **2000 Thirteen Days**
  - The Cell
  - Crime and Punishment in Suburbia
  - It All Starts Today
  - It's the Rage
  - Kippur
  - The Terrorist
  - Titanic Town
  - X-Men
- **2001 Lumumba**
  - Atlantis: The Lost Empire
  - Divided We Fall
  - Journey to the Sun
- **2002 The Quiet American**
  - Antwone Fisher
  - Das Experiment
  - K-19: The Widowmaker
  - The Sum of All Fears
  - Time of Favor
  - To End All Wars
  - We Were Soldiers
- **2003 Bawandar**
  - Beyond Borders
  - Cold Mountain
  - The Dancer Upstairs
  - X2: X-Men United
- **2004 Tae Guk Gi**
  - Carandiru
  - Hotel Rwanda
  - A Very Long Engagement
- **2005 Munich**
  - Before the Fall
  - Downfall
  - In My Country
  - Jarhead
  - Private
- **2006 Joyeux Noël**
  - End of the Spear
  - Letters from Iwo Jima
- **2007 O Jerusalem**
  - Black Friday
  - In the Valley of Elah
  - Pierrepoint
  - Redacted
  - September Dawn
  - The Situation
- **2008 Stop-Loss**
  - Gran Torino
- **2009 The Hurt Locker**
  - Avatar
  - Brothers
  - Fifty Dead Men Walking
  - Flame & Citron
  - Inglourious Basterds
  - A Woman in Berlin

== 2010s ==
- **2010 The Ghost Writer**
  - Formosa Betrayed
  - Green Zone
  - John Rabe
- **2011 5 Days of War**
  - Amigo
  - City of Life and Death
  - Elite Squad: The Enemy Within
  - The Flowers of War
  - Kinyarwanda
  - The Lady
  - Machine Gun Preacher
  - Of Gods and Men
- **2012 West of Thunder**
  - War of the Buttons
- **2013**
  - Zaytoun
- **2014 Diplomacy**
  - Cesar Chavez
  - Giovanni's Island
  - The Railway Man
- **2015 Timbuktu**
  - Beasts of No Nation
  - Tangerines
- **2016**
  - Eye in the Sky
  - Land of Mine
  - Tanna
- **2019 Ashes in the Snow**
  - 15 Minutes of War
  - Jirga
  - Official Secrets

== 2020s ==
- **2021 Margrete: Queen of the North**
  - The Courier
  - Gift of Fire
  - Hive
  - The Trial of the Chicago 7
- **2022 All Quiet on the Western Front**
  - Donbass
- **2023 Aurora's Sunrise**
  - Golda
- **2025** Shoshana
  - No Other Land
  - Palestine 30

== See also ==
- Political Film Society Award for Democracy
- Political Film Society Award for Exposé
- Political Film Society Award for Human Rights
