= Political Film Society Award for Democracy =

American film award

The Political Film Society Award for Democracy is given out each year by the Political Film Society to a film that promotes, educates, and raises the awareness level of the public in the specific areas of democracy and freedom. This award has been handed out by the Society since 1988. Depending on the number of movies that qualify, sometimes only one film is nominated for this award, but as many as seven have been nominated in years past.

The film that first won this award was The Milagro Beanfield War in 1988. The only other award nominated in 1988 against The Milagro Beanfield War was Stand and Deliver.

In the following list of nominees and winners of the Political Film Society Award for Democracy, the winners are indicated in bold.

== 1980s ==
- **1988** **The Milagro Beanfield War**
  - Stand and Deliver
- **1989** **Dead Poets Society**

== 1990s ==
- **1990** **Born on the Fourth of July**
- **1991** **City of Hope**
  - JFK
- **1992** **Bob Roberts**
  - City of Joy
  - Howards End
  - The Power of One
- **1993** **Indochine**
  - Dave
  - The Secret Garden
  - The Piano
- **1994** **Rapa Nui**
- **1995** **Beyond Rangoon**
- **1996** **No films won**
  - Basquiat
  - Dead Man Walking
  - The People Vs. Larry Flynt
- **1997** **Red Corner**
  - Rainmaker
- **1998** **Four Days in September**
  - Enemy of the State
  - Primary Colors
  - The Siege
  - The Truman Show
  - Wag the Dog
- **1999** **The Insider**
  - East of Hope Street
  - Fight Club
  - Naturally Native
  - Three Kings

== 2000s ==
- **2000** **Sunshine**
  - The Contender
  - Human Resources
  - The Hurricane
  - It All Starts Today
  - Steal This Movie!
- **2001** **The Majestic**
  - Antitrust
  - Bread and Roses
  - Lumumba
- **2002** **Y Tu Mamá También**
  - 24 Hour Party People
  - Das Experiment
  - Max
  - Secret Ballot
  - The Town Is Quiet
  - Atlantis: The Lost Empire
  - Bread and Roses
  - Lumumba
- **2003** **Shattered Glass**
  - Herod's Law
  - Runaway Jury
  - Sandstorm
  - Veronica Guerin
- **2004** **Silver City**
  - The Assassination of Richard Nixon
  - Moolaadé
  - The Motorcycle Diaries
- **2005** **Machuca**
  - Downfall
- **2006** **Sophie Scholl: The Final Days**
  - Cautiva
  - Death of a President
  - The Listening
- **2007** **Amazing Grace**
  - September Dawn
  - Shooter
- **2008** **Milk**
  - Changeling
  - Flash of Genius
  - Nothing But the Truth
- **2009** **Invictus**

== 2010s ==
- **2010** **Blood Done Sign My Name**
  - Formosa Betrayed
  - Princess Ka`iulani
- **2011** **The Lady**
  - Amigo
  - Elite Squad 2: The Enemy Within
  - Of Gods and Men
  - Man of the Year
- **2012** **Lincoln**
  - Promised Land
- **2013** **Mandela: Long Walk to Freedom**
  - Capital
- **2014** **Cesar Chavez**
  - Free the Nipple
  - Kill the Messenger
- **2015** **Jimmy's Hall**
  - Straight Outta Compton
  - The 33
  - Timbuktu
- **2017** **A United Kingdom**
  - Bitter Harvest
  - The Post
  - Tickling Giants
- **2019** **The Report**
  - Official Secrets

== 2020s ==
- **2020**
  - Irresistible
- **2021**
  - Hive
- **2022** **Argentina, 1985**
- **2023** **Aurora's Sunrise**
- **2024**
  - Kidnapped
- **2025** An Officer and a Spy
  - Lilly
  - No Other Land

== See also ==
- Political Film Society Award for Exposé
- Political Film Society Award for Human Rights
- Political Film Society Award for Peace
