= Dan Davies (actor) =

American actor (born 1965)

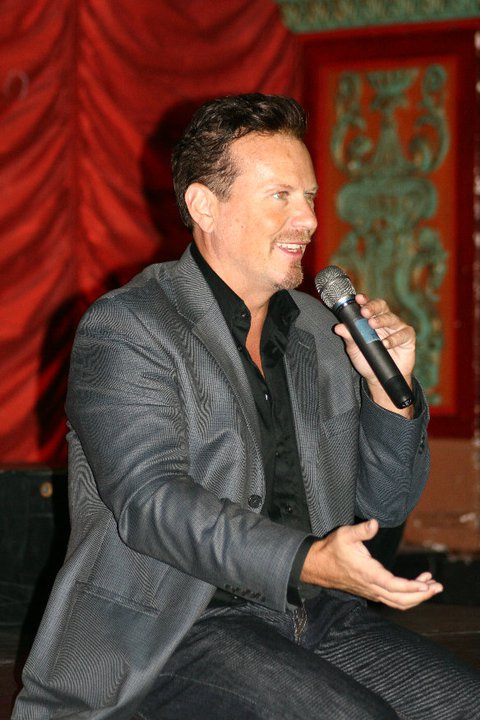
- Dan Davies at the Music Box Theatre, Chicago in 2010
- Born: Daniel Joseph Davies; December 25, 1965 (age 60); Milwaukee, Wisconsin, U.S.
- Occupations: Actor; writer; producer
- Years active: 1994–Present

Daniel Joseph "Dan" Davies (born December 25, 1965) is an American actor, screenplay writer, and producer. Davies wrote, co-produced and starred in the comedy film Ed Gein, the Musical (2010), about the cannibalistic murderer and graverobber, Ed Gein.

== Early life ==
Davies was born in Milwaukee, Wisconsin. He attended Waupaca High School in Waupaca, Wisconsin and he graduated from the University of Wisconsin–La Crosse with a B.A. in Political Science and English. Davies claims Irish, Welsh and American Indian heritage.

== Career ==
In 1997, he wrote and hosted the instructional video, The Games We Used to Play.

In 2010 he wrote, co-produced and played the title character in Ed Gein, The Musical, a micro-budget horror/musical/comedy film.

Davies co-wrote the screenplay for, and acted in the film, West of Thunder. He co-starred with Sadie Kaye in Miss Adventure meets Motörhead, which was a highly rated video on Will Ferrell/HBO's Funny or Die. He was part of an ensemble cast in the British Independent Film Award (BIFA) nominated mockumentary feature film "Flim, the Movie". He played the role of Scorpion alongside the Nollywood actor Ramsey Nouah in the Hollywood/Nollywood collaboration, Tempting Fate (2015 film). It premiered at the Pan African Film Festival in 2015 and is a Dove Foundation Award-winning film.

Davies also co-starred with Ayo Makun, Funke Akindele, Nse Ikpe-Etim and Eric Roberts in the Nollywood/Hollywood comedy A Trip to Jamaica that was released in September, 2016. This film also premiered in London in Dec 2016 and held the highest per-screen average in the UK during its box office run. The film has been nominated in 5 categories for the Africa Magic Viewers Choice Awards 2017. It also has been nominated for a 2017 African Academy Award (Best Comedy) It was the No. 1 Nollywood box office film of 2016, and, as of December 2016, became the No. 1 Nollywood box office film of all time. He was nominated for Best Supporting Actor (Comedy) along with Majid Michel and John Dumelo in the 2017 Golden Movie Awards for his work in A Trip to Jamaica. He won the award July 22. The award ceremonies were televised on the African Movie Channel throughout Africa as well as the UK, Germany, France and The Netherlands.

In 2017 he appeared in the revenge thriller Wronged and the psychological thriller/horror Mr. Thursday.

In 2019 he founded the National Independent Film Association also known as the NIFA Awards. That same year, he awarded Sean Connery and country legend Neal McCoy NIFA Lifetime Achievement Awards This film awards show takes place yearly in October.

He had a supporting role in The Runners (2020) featuring Tom Sizemore and Neal McCoy.

In addition to his screen work, Davies plays a recurring character on the Mental Ideas radio show on Radio Television Hong Kong (RTHK). The program was nominated for an Association of International Broadcasters (AIB) Award in 2020. The AIB Award Show was televised by Al Jazeera TV.

In March of 2021 Davies wrote and published a comedic semi-autobiographical book about his career entitled, The Rantings of a Madman on Facebook: The Inspiration, Perspiration & Inebriation of a Lovable Loser. Also in 2021, Davies appeared in I Dream of a Psychopomp. It premiered at the Music Box Theatre (Chicago) and later secured international distribution

Davies created and launched his own book publishing company called Renegade Press in the Spring of 2022. This boutique publisher specializes in publishing 3-5 books a year.

In 2023 his film (Screenwriter/Producer/Actor) "Ed Gein, the Musical" received national distribution via SRS Cinema and the film went on a limited screening 13th Anniversary Cinema Tour. Davies then adapted the film into a theatrical play. It had its world premiere April 3-5, 2025.

In 2025 Davies co-produced a reimagined reboot of the 1975 cult classic film The Giant Spider Invasion. He also plays a starring role in it. Theatrical release is scheduled for 2026.
