= CSJ =

CSJ or C.S.J. may refer to:

- Campaign for Social Justice, a group which began campaigning for civil rights in Northern Ireland in 1964
- Centre for Social Justice
  - CSJ Alliance
  - CSJ Awards
- Chemical Society of Japan
- Congregation of the Sisters of Saint Joseph
- Cultic Studies Journal predecessor to the Cultic Studies Review
- ICAO airline designator for Castle Aviation
- Jung Chan-Sung, a South Korean mixed martial artist
- Superior Council of Judicature of Colombia
- Supreme Court of Justice of Moldova, or Curtea Supremă de Justiție a Republicii Moldova in Romanian
