= Bunny Gibbons =

American funfair owner

Bunny Gibbons was an American funfair owner in the 1950s, based in and around Rockford, Illinois.

== Ed Gein's Car ==
Gibbons' fair's attractions included the car of the murderer Ed Gein. The car was a 1949 Ford sedan and had been used to transport the bodies which Gein had exhumed from local graveyards. He bought the car in an auction for Gein's estate, held in 1958. Fourteen different bids were placed for the car, yet Gibbons held out and won. Gibbons ended up paying the then-considerable amount of $760 (equivalent to $8,000 in 2023) . Gibbons called his attraction the "Ed Gein Ghoul Car".

=== Controversy ===
The car was first displayed in Seymour, Wisconsin in July 1958. In its first two days, the attraction pulled in more than 2,000 visitors. The exhibit was immediately embroiled in controversy, and officials from Mental Health America of Wisconsin fought to close the exhibit. Despite Gibbons's initial delight with the publicity, interest began to fade in the car.
