= Naturally Native =

1998 film about Native Americans

- Directed by: Valerie Red-Horse; Jennifer Wynne Farmer
- Screenplay by: Valerie Red-Horse
- Produced by: Pam Auer: line producer Dawn Jackson: executive producer / producer Valerie Red-Horse: producer Yvonne Russo: producer
- Starring: Valerie Red-Horse; Yvonne Russo; Irene Bedard
- Cinematography: Bruce L. Finn
- Edited by: Lorraine Salk
- Music by: Murielle Hamilton
- Production company: Red-horse Native Productions
- Release date: January 1998
- Running time: 107 minutes
- Country: US
- Budget: $700,000

Naturally Native is a 1998 American drama film directed by Valerie Red-Horse. It is the first feature film created by and about Native American women, and the first entirely financed by a tribe.

The film follows three Native American sisters who were adopted in 1972 after being orphaned and reunite as adults to form their own business.

== Synopsis ==
Naturally Native follows the lives and relationships of three Native American sisters as they attempt to start their own business. The sisters were adopted as young children by white foster parents, resulting in each having her own identity issues. However, the three together decide to launch a Native cosmetic business, and must overcome obstacles both personal and public. The film is imbued with messages regarding the social status and challenges faced by Native Americans in modern times.

== Production ==
Writer and director Valerie Red-Horse wanted to make a film depicting her own obstacles obtaining funding for her films in Hollywood, as well as her frustration about the types of roles designated for Natives in the film industry. She enrolled in a class on low-budget filmmaking at UCLA with her friend Jennifer Farmer (Pumpkin Man). According to Red-Horse, their classmates did not take them seriously, but Red-Horse moved forward with creating the film, and asked Farmer to co-direct with her. Together with co-producers Dawn Jackson and Yvonne Russo, she approached the Mashantucket Pequot Tribe of Connecticut asking for $100,000, with a plan to approach other tribes for a total budget of $700,000. To her surprise, the tribe offered her the total amount.

The film was shot in the Los Angeles area in only 19 days starting in October 1997, with Emmy Award-winner Bruce L. Finn (My Indian Summer (1995), directed by Red-Horse) as cinematographer. Kimberly Norris Guerrero (TNT's Geronimo) and Irene Bedard (Lakota Woman: Siege at Wounded Knee) were cast to play the other sisters, alongside Red-Horse. Crew was recruited voluntarily or at low cost based on the desire to realize Red-Horse's vision.

== Release ==
The film premiered at the Sundance Film Festival in 1998. Red-Horse then took the film to festivals, Indian reservations and to Europe, and also screened the film at Paramount Studios to a Hollywood audience. The film failed to obtain a US distributor, and was released directly to video. In 2017 Red-horse uploaded the full feature on the online streaming service Vimeo. As of 2021 it is still available to watch on that platform for free.

Red-Horse created a line of hair products named after the film.

== Reception ==
Los Angeles Times critic Kevin Thomas wrote that the film "has lots to say but proves so stirring that it sustains its didactic stretches. A celebration of sisterly love and devotion, it focuses on the lives of three beautiful and intelligent siblings, and Valerie Red-Horse, Irene Bedard and Kimberly Norris Guerrero deliver such strong, committed portrayals that the sisters and the issues they confront become very real. ... They have no idea that the search for modest financing for their venture will lead to such a profound confrontation with their need to work out their identities as Native Americans. Along the way their experiences illuminate the social, political and economic realities that members of all minorities deal with—in addition to the challenges that face all human beings trying to live lives that offer meaning and the promise of better opportunities for their children. ... By the time the film is over, the sisters have moved from the particular to the universal. Vickie is much like Helena Rubinstein was nearly a century ago when she started building a cosmetics empire from a face cream formula handed down to her in her native Poland. Vickie, Karen and Tanya are like women everywhere who gathered courage to gamble on their own abilities in defiance of traditional expectations of what women's roles should be."

The review in Deseret News opined that the film's message occasionally got in the way of good storytelling, but that the message was one worth hearing, and that moreover, it is refreshing to see Native Americans in lead roles telling their own stories. C. E. Chambers wrote that the film "is a rough diamond that was formed by resolve and cut to brilliance by hard work and prayer. It’s a movie with a message, a stereotype-smasher that leaves audiences with the unmistakable impression that Valerie Red-Horse, writer, producer, co-director, and lead actress, is someone to take notice of – and someone not to be trifled with".

== Awards ==
Year	Award	Category	Nominee(s)	Result
2000	Political Film Society	Democracy	Naturally Native	Nominated
2000	Political Film Society	Exposé	Naturally Native	Nominated
2000	Political Film Society	Human Rights	Naturally Native	Nominated
2000	First Americans In The Arts (FAITA)	Best-Writing	Valerie Red-Horse	Won
2000	First Americans In The Arts (FAITA)	Best Directing	Valerie Red-Horse Jennifer Farmer	Won
2000	First Americans In The Arts (FAITA)	Best Producing	Dawn Jackson, Yvonne Russo & Valerie Red-Horse Mashantucket Pequot Tribal Nation	Won
2000	First Americans In The Arts (FAITA)	Outstanding New Performer	Lowell Raven	Won
1999	Santa Clarita International Film Festival	Top Applause Award	Valerie Red-Horse Jennifer Farmer	Won
1999	Young Artist Awards	Best Performance in a TV Movie/Pilot/Mini-Series or Series - Young Actor Age Ten or Under	Lowell Raven	Nominated
1999	Young Artist Awards	Best Performance in a TV Movie/Pilot/Mini-Series or Series - Supporting Young Actress	Valerie Red-Horse	Nominated
1999	Dreamspeakers Film Festival	Special Jury Award	Naturally Native	Won
1999	Worldfest (Flagstaff, Arizona)	Independent Feature Film-Low Budget	Naturally Native	Won
1999	Worldfest Houston	Independent Feature Film-Low Budget	Naturally Native	Won
1999	American Indian Film Festival	Producers of the Year	Dawn Jackson, Yvonne Russo & Valerie Red-Horse	Won
