= Lumumba (film) =

- Directed by: Raoul Peck
- Written by: Pascal Bonitzer; Dan Edelstein; Raoul Peck
- Produced by: Jacques Bidou; Raoul Peck
- Starring: Eriq Ebouaney
- Cinematography: Bernard Lutic
- Edited by: Jacques Comets
- Music by: Jean-Claude Petit
- Distributed by: Océan Films Distribution (France); Cinéart (Belgium); EZEF (Germany)
- Release date: 14 May 2000 (Cannes)
- Running time: 115 minutes
- Countries: France; Belgium; Germany; Haiti
- Languages: French; Lingala; English

Lumumba is a 2000 biographical film directed by Raoul Peck. A co-production of France, Germany, Belgium, and Haiti filmed in French, the film depicts the rise and fall of Patrice Lumumba, and is set in the months before and after Congo-Léopoldville achieved independence from Belgium in June 1960. War in the Democratic Republic of the Congo at the time of filming caused the film to be shot in Zimbabwe and Beira, Mozambique. The film received positive reviews from critics, and won awards from the American Black Film Festival, the Political Film Society, and the Panafrican Film and Television Festival of Ouagadougou.

== Plot ==
The film begins with a montage of Lumumba and his compatriots Joseph Okito and Maurice Mpolo being driven to their executions, cutting to their bodies being exhumed, dismembered, and burned on the orders of Joseph Mobutu. The film then jumps back to the late 1950s as Lumumba has a debate with Moïse Tshombe and Godefroid Munongo, rival politicians from the pro-Western CONAKAT party. Lumumba expresses his Pan-Africanist ideals, which infuriate Tshombe and Munongo.

Following the debate, the film cuts back to Lumumba receiving his job as a beer salesman. While using his beer sales to promote his political ideas in Leopoldville, Lumumba meets Joseph Mobutu for the first time. After hearing that King Baudouin of Belgium has become more favorable to independence, the street meeting is broken up by Force Publique soldiers, who arrest and imprison Lumumba where he is beaten by the Belgian guards before being freed and sent to Brussels to negotiate Congolese independence.

While in Brussels, Lumumba first meets Joseph Kasa-Vubu, a fellow independence-minded politician from the rival ABAKO party, who wishes to better compromise with the Belgians. Upset that the Belgians do not recognize the legitimacy of the Mouvement National Congolais despite their success in the elections, Lumumba backs Kasavubu for president, who in turn appoints Lumumba as prime minister. On the night of the coalition's formation, Lumumba is threatened by Tshombe and Munongo, who were not given any leadership positions in the new government. At the formal recognition of independence from King Baudouin, Lumumba's speech strikes a more combative tone than Kasavubu's, highlighting the oppression that the Congolese suffered under Belgian rule.

Shortly afterwards, the Congo Crisis begins. The cabinet then debates the removal of Force Publique commander Émile Janssens, who does not support African officers. Following the assault by soldiers of a Walloon couple, the Belgian ambassador visits Lumumba and makes veiled threats to involve the United Nations and NATO, which infuriates Lumumba, insisting that the Belgians have caused the problem by retaining a segregated military. Lumumba dismisses Janssens and charges the ambassador with removing him from the country.

On a visit to Katanga, Munongo refuses to allow the government's plane to land, signaling the secession of Katanga into the State of Katanga. After a run-in with Belgian troops at Ndjili, Lumumba drives to crush the secessionist Katangans. Evidence surfaces that Mobutu's forces massacred large numbers of civilians while fighting the Katangan rebels, and Lumumba dismisses a recalcitrant Mobutu, upset that he will have to answer for Mobutu's atrocities. He brushes off support from the United States, and meets with an exhausted Kasavubu, where he reveals that he feels that the Soviet Union is the only country that he can rely on for support. At a military camp, the American ambassador pledges his support to Mobutu, provided that he help in eliminating Lumumba. Kasavubu dismisses Lumumba for both his alleged communist sympathies and his perceived role in the South Kasai massacres, creating political deadlock due to Lumumba's widespread popularity. After condemning Kasavubu's criticism and brushing off accusations of being a communist, Lumumba returns home where he learns that his infant daughter must be sent to Switzerland, since she is gravely ill. Mobutu arrives and tells Lumumba that Kasavubu wanted him arrested, but has elected to place him under house arrest instead, leading Lumumba to suspect that Mobutu is working with a foreign power.

Later, Mobutu announces that the army has seized power, and claims to have arrested both Lumumba and Kasavubu. While plotting his escape to Stanleyville, Lumumba learns that his infant daughter has died in Switzerland. While Lumumba and his partisans cross the river towards Stanleyville, soldiers arrive and accost Lumumba's family on the riverbank and he returns to face them, where he is arrested. At Mobutu's military encampment, he and others vote to kill Lumumba, with Kasavubu reluctantly casting his vote. Lumumba, Mpolo, and Okito are taken to Katanga where they are brutally beaten, with Munongo joining in. The ending of the film intersperses Mobutu, now Mobutu Sese Seko, publicly remembering Lumumba, with shots of the men's executions in dark woods.

== Cast ==
- Eriq Ebouaney as Patrice Lumumba
- Alex Descas as Joseph-Desiré Mobutu (Mobutu Sese Seko)
- Théophile Sowié as Maurice Mpolo
- Maka Kotto as Joseph Kasa-Vubu
- Dieudonné Kabongo as Godefroid Munongo
- Pascal N'Zonzi as Moïse Tshombe
- Olivier Bony as King Baudouin of the Belgians
- André Debaar as Walter J. Ganshof Van der Meersch
- Cheik Doukouré as Joseph Okito
- Mata Gabin as Helene Bijou
- Makena Diop as Thomas Kanza
- Mariam Kaba as Pauline Lumumba
- Rudi Delhem as General Émile Janssens
- Den Thatcher as Frank Carlucci

== Release ==
The film premiered at the 2000 Cannes Film Festival on 14 May 2000, and it was shown at various film festivals as well as having commercial releases in Belgium, France, Switzerland, the United States and Canada. The film grossed $684,000 in the US. It also aired on HBO.

=== Disputed scene ===
The film generated some controversy in 2002, when Frank Carlucci, a former American government official and protege of Donald Rumsfeld, persuaded HBO to delete a reference to him during the airing of the film. The scene in question involves a group of Belgian and Congolese officials deciding whether to kill Lumumba. Carlucci is asked for input, and he mumbles that the US government does not involve itself in the internal affairs of other countries. At the time, Carlucci was the second secretary of the US Embassy in Congo. He denies playing any role in the death of Lumumba, saying "The scene is tendentious, false, libelous; it never happened and it is a cheap shot."

According to one source, the scene was deleted from the version of the film that aired on HBO. Another source says that the scene was not deleted, but the word "Carlucci" was bleeped in the dialogue, with the name masked in the credits. The scene remains on the DVD version of the film.

== Reception ==
The film received mostly positive reviews from critics. On the review aggregator website Rotten Tomatoes, 81% of 59 critics' reviews are positive, with an average rating of 7.1/10. The website's consensus reads: "Ebouaney's fiery performance makes Lumumba compelling." Metacritic, which uses a weighted average, assigned the film a score of 78 out of 100, based on 22 critics, indicating "generally favorable" reviews.

Reviewing the film in The Guardian, Alex Tunzelmann noted Peck's "commendable effort to get as close to the truth as possible, incorporating many details from historical investigator Ludo de Witte's The Assassination of Lumumba. Tunzelmann suggested the film might move too quickly through the Congo and Lumumba's history for viewers not already familiar with it to keep up, but said the "last part of the film, from Lumumba's falling out with Mobutu to his death, is gripping to watch, building to a superb last scene intercutting Lumumba's fate with Mobutu's attempt to rewrite history." Writing for The New York Times, Elvis Mitchell read the film's pace as "refus[ing] to lay out Lumumba's life in traditional, corny terms by presenting a lengthy and unwieldy history lesson and then groveling for audience sympathy. Instead Lumumba vaults through his radicalization and the track that led this former civil servant and beer salesman to leave his angry stamp on the world."

== Accolades ==
Award	Category	Recipient	Result	Ref
Acapulco Black Film Festival	Best Feature Film	Raoul Peck	Won	
Black Reel Awards	Theatrical: Best Independent Actor	Eriq Ebouaney	Nominated	
Black Reel Awards	Theatrical: Best Independent Film	Raoul Peck	Nominated	
Cannes Film Festival	C.I.C.A.E. Award	Raoul Peck	Nominated	
Independent Spirit Awards	Best Foreign Film	Raoul Peck	Nominated	
Milan African Film Festival	Best Film	Raoul Peck	Nominated	
Panafrican Film and Television Festival of Ouagadougou	Best Feature Length Film	Raoul Peck	Won	
Political Film Society	Political Film Society Award for Peace	Raoul Peck	Won	
Political Film Society	Political Film Society Award for Democracy	Raoul Peck	Nominated	
Political Film Society	Political Film Society Award for Human Rights	Raoul Peck	Nominated	
Political Film Society	Political Film Society Award for Exposé	Raoul Peck	Nominated	
