= Valerie Red-Horse =

American actress

Valerie Red-Horse Mohl (born 1959) is an American investment banker, business owner and filmmaker. She is a former CEO of two Financial Industry Regulatory Authority (FINRA) broker/dealers, Native Nations Securities and Red-Horse Securities believed to be the first Native American female owned broker-dealers.

== Education and career ==
=== Early years ===
In 1981, Red-Horse graduated cum laude from UCLA's Theater Arts Department and further studied at the Lee Strasberg Theater Institute. Before she finished college, she started work at Drexel Burnham Lambert as office manager from 1978 to 1985 for John Kissick in the Corporate Finance Department. She is married to Curt Mohl, whom she met when she was a cheerleader and he was a UCLA football player. They have three children. She is on the tribal council of the Texas Band of Cherokee.

=== Red-Horse Native Productions ===
Red-Horse became the founder, president, and principal owner of Red-Horse Native Productions, Inc., a company specializing in motion picture and television production and Native American herbal skincare and hair care products. Naturally Native (1998) was filmed by Red-Horse Native Productions, and Red-Horse was writer, producer, co-director and lead actress for the film. The movie was funded by the Mashantucket Pequot Tribal Nation of Connecticut with financing from its Foxwoods Casino and premiered at the 1998 Sundance Film Festival. Naturally Native received festival awards and in 2007 Red-Horse Native Productions nationally distributed the film in Wal-Mart. Red-Horse followed with the World War II PBS/ITVS documentary “True Whispers: The Story of The Navajo Code Talkers”, produced with Gale Anne Hurd of Valhalla Entertainment. Red-Horse also produced/directed the “prequel” follow up program, again with Hurd, Choctaw Code Talkers regarding the Code Talkers’ involvement in World War I.

Red-Horse recently served as a co-curator for a comprehensive 100 year Native American film retrospective and national tour sponsored by the UCLA Film and Archive which toured the nation from 2014 to 2016.

=== Native Nations and Red-Horse Financial Group ===
In 1998 Red-Horse started a FINRA licensed securities Jersey City, New Jersey–based firm, Native Nations Securities, believed to be the first Native American owned investment banks. The firm provided financial services geared specifically to tribal finance, tribal economic development, and youth training programs.

In 2004 Red-Horse moved her office to California and formed her own advisory corporation, Red-Horse Financial Group, Inc. clearing securities through Western International Securities. Since 2004 Red-Horse Financial Group, with Red-Horse at the helm, has closed several financing and advisory transactions for tribal clients establishing Red-Horse as a leading expert in the tribal finance space. In the course of her financial career, Red-Horse has structured, advised for and/or raised over $3 billion in capital for American Indian Tribal Nations.
