= Théophile Sowié =

Burkinabe actor (died 2021)

- Born: Burkina Faso
- Died: 7 April 2021
- Education: University of Sorbonne Nouvelle Paris 3
- Occupation: Actor
- Notable work: Les Visiteurs

Théophile Sowié (died 7 April 2021) was a Burkinabe actor.

== Biography ==
Sowié attended the Institute of Theatre Studies at the University of Sorbonne Nouvelle Paris 3 and the École d'art dramatique Jacques Lecoq in Paris. In the film Lumumba directed by Raoul Peck, he played Minister of Youth and Sports of the Republic of the Congo Maurice Mpolo. He was well known in France for his role as the postman in Les Visiteurs. He was therefore able to appear in the sequel, titled The Visitors II: The Corridors of Time.

Théophile Sowié died on 7 April 2021. He was buried in his home village of Bérégadougou.

== Filmography ==
=== Feature films ===
- The Blue Note (1991)
- Les Visiteurs (1993)
- The Visitors II: The Corridors of Time (1998)
- Louise (Take 2) (1998)
- Les Migrations de Vladimir (1999)
- Lumumba (2000)
- L'Afrance (2001)
- Magonia (2001)
- Moolaadé (2004)
- Le Secret de l'enfant fourmi (2012)
- Le Crocodile du Botswanga (2014)
- Fastlife (2014)

=== Telefilms ===
- Petit (1993)
- Au revoir... et à bientôt ! (2015)

=== Television ===
- Navarro (1990)
- Antoine Rives, juge du terrorisme (1993)
- Navarro (1993)
- SOS 18 (2010)

== Awards ==
- Prix Radio-France
