= Curt Mohl =

American football player (born 1959)

Profile
- Position: Offensive tackle

Personal information
- Born: October 12, 1958 (age 68); Chico, California, U.S.
- Listed height: 6 ft 4 in (1.93 m)
- Listed weight: 260 lb (118 kg)

Career information
- College: UCLA
- NFL draft: 1981: 9th round, 248th overall pick

Career history
- Oakland Raiders (1981)*; Winnipeg Blue Bombers (1982)*; Baltimore Colts (1982)*; Arizona Wranglers (1983)*; Boston Breakers (1983); Philadelphia Stars (1984)*
- * Offseason or practice squad member only

Curtis D. Mohl (born October 12, 1959) is an American former professional football player who was an offensive tackle in the United States Football League (USFL). He played college football for the UCLA Bruins, and was selected by the Oakland Raiders in the ninth round of the 1981 NFL draft. He played for the Boston Breakers of the USFL in 1983.

== Professional career ==
Mohl was drafted by the Oakland Raiders in the ninth round (248th overall) of the 1981 NFL draft. He was waived before the start of the regular season on August 13, 1981.

Mohl signed with the Winnipeg Blue Bombers of the Canadian Football League on February 16, 1982, but ultimately did not play for the team. He signed with the Baltimore Colts during training camp, but was released for being late to a practice on July 30, 1982.

Mohl signed with the Arizona Wranglers of the USFL on October 28, 1982. He was waived by the team on February 27, 1983. He signed with the Boston Breakers in April 1983.

Mohl signed with the Philadelphia Stars on November 7, 1983. He was waived/injured by the team with a knee injury on February 7, 1984.

== Personal life ==
Mohl is married to Valerie Red-Horse.
