= Ed Gein, the Musical =

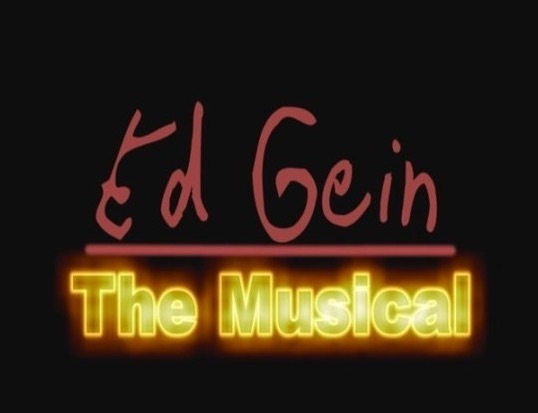
- Poster
- Directed by: Steve Russell
- Screenplay by: Dan Davies
- Produced by: Dan Davies
- Starring: Dan Davies
- Release date: January 2010 (Wisconsin)
- Country: United States
- Language: English

Ed Gein, The Musical is a comedic musical film and theatrical stage musical about the grave robbing serial killer Ed Gein. It premiered in Wisconsin in January 2010 and starred Dan Davies, who also co-produced and wrote the screenplay. It was directed by Steve Russell. The film aired on PBS and the Retro TV Network. The theatrical stage musical had a limited premiere at the Times Community Theater in Oshkosh, Wisconsin on April 4–6, 2025.

== Stage Play Adaptation ==
Davies began the process of adapting the film into a theatrical stage musical of the same name, which culminated in a world premiere at the Time Community Theater in Oshkosh, WI. Davies elected not to reprise his role of Ed Gein, citing in multiple interviews that “45 years of cigars and Wisconsin beers” had taken its toll on his voice. Davies, also citing his age, cast himself in the role of Sheriff Murdock, ceding the role of Gein to local award winning Milwaukee film actor, director, and writer Ezekiel N. Drews.

The theatrical production, helmed by Deborah Ransbottom, had its initial run at the Times Community Theater from April 4–6, 2025 with over 400 ticketed attendees.
