= Indochine (film) =

1992 film by Régis Wargnier

- French theatrical release poster
- Directed by: Régis Wargnier
- Written by: Érik Orsenna; Louis Gardel; Catherine Cohen; Régis Wargnier
- Produced by: Eric Heumann; Jean Labadie
- Starring: Catherine Deneuve; Vincent Pérez; Linh Dan Pham; Jean Yanne
- Cinematography: François Catonné
- Edited by: Agnès Schwab; Geneviève Winding
- Music by: Patrick Doyle
- Production companies: Paradis Films; BAC Films; Orly Films; Ciné Cinq
- Distributed by: BAC Films
- Release date: 15 April 1992
- Running time: 159 minutes
- Country: France
- Languages: French; Vietnamese
- Box office: $29.6 million

Indochine (French pronunciation: [ɛ̃dɔʃin]) is a 1992 French period drama film set in colonial French Indochina from the 1930s to the 1950s. It is the story of Éliane Devries, a French plantation owner, and of her adopted Vietnamese daughter, Camille, set against the backdrop of the rising Vietnamese nationalist movement. The screenplay was written by novelist Érik Orsenna, screenwriters Louis Gardel and Catherine Cohen, and director Régis Wargnier. The film stars Catherine Deneuve, Vincent Pérez, Linh Dan Pham, Jean Yanne and Dominique Blanc. The film won the Academy Award for Best Foreign Language Film at the 65th Academy Awards, and Deneuve was nominated for Best Actress.

== Plot ==
In 1930, Éliane Devries, a woman born to French parents in colonial Indochina, runs her and her widowed father's rubber plantation with indentured laborers. She is the adoptive mother of Camille, a teenaged girl whose birth parents were friends of Éliane's and members of the Nguyễn dynasty.

Éliane meets young French Navy lieutenant Jean-Baptiste Le Guen when they bid on the same painting at an auction. He challenges her publicly and, days later, turns up at her plantation searching for a boy whose sampan he set ablaze on suspicion of opium smuggling. Éliane and Jean-Baptiste begin an affair.

Camille meets Jean-Baptiste by chance when, one day, he rescues her from a prisoner escape attempt. She falls in love with him. After learning of this, Éliane uses her connections with high-ranking Navy officials to get Jean-Baptiste transferred to Haiphong. He confronts Éliane about this during a Christmas party, and in the ensuing argument, slaps her in front of his fellow officers. For this, he is sent to Dragon Islet (Hòn Rồng), a remote French military base in northern Indochina.

Éliane allows Camille to become engaged to Thanh, a pro-Communist Vietnamese boy expelled as a student from France because of his support for the 1930 Yên Bái mutiny. A sympathetic Thanh allows Camille to search for Jean-Baptiste up north. Traveling on foot, Camille reaches Dragon Islet and is imprisoned along with a Vietnamese family she travels with and other laborers. After seeing French officers torture and murder her traveling companions, she attacks an officer and shoots him in the struggle. Jean-Baptiste defies his superiors to protect Camille in the ensuing firefight, and the two flee.

After spending days adrift in the Gulf of Tonkin, Camille and Jean-Baptiste reach land and are taken in by a Communist theater troupe, who offers them refuge in a secluded valley. Months later, Camille is pregnant with Jean-Baptiste's child, but they must vacate the valley out of safety. Thanh, now a high-ranking Communist operative, arranges for the troupe to smuggle the lovers into China.

Camille and Jean-Baptiste's story becomes a legend in tuồng performances by Vietnamese actors. When the couple nears the Chinese border, Jean-Baptiste takes his newborn son, Étienne, to baptize him in a river while Camille sleeps. After christening Étienne, Jean-Baptiste is ambushed by French soldiers. Camille evades capture and escapes with the troupe, while Jean-Baptiste is remanded to a Saigon jail and Étienne is handed over to Éliane.

After days in prison, Jean-Baptiste agrees to talk if he can first see Étienne. The Navy, which has authority over the case, plans to court-martial Jean-Baptiste in Brest, France to avoid the public outcry that would arise from a trial in Indochina. Jean-Baptiste is allowed a 24-hour visitation with Étienne before being taken to France. He goes to see Éliane, who lets him stay with Étienne at her Saigon residence for the night.

The next day, Éliane finds Jean-Baptiste dead in his bed with a gunshot to his temple, a gun in hand, and an unharmed Étienne. Outraged, Éliane suspects that the police murdered him, but learns that the Communists may have done it to silence Jean-Baptiste. The death is eventually ruled a suicide. Camille is captured and sent to Poulo-Condor – a high-security prison where visitors are not permitted. After five years, the Popular Front comes to power and releases all political prisoners, including Camille. Éliane reunites with Camille, who declines to return to her mother and son, choosing instead to fight for Vietnam's independence with the Communists. Taking Étienne with her, Éliane sells her plantation and leaves Indochina.

In 1954, Éliane and a grown Étienne visit Switzerland, where Camille is a Vietnamese Communist Party delegate to the Geneva Conference. Looking for Camille, Étienne goes to the negotiators' hotel, which is so crowded that he is not sure how she can find or recognize him. He tells Éliane that he sees her as his mother. The next day, French Indochina becomes independent from France and Vietnam is partitioned into North and South Vietnam.

== Cast ==
- Catherine Deneuve as Éliane Devries
- Vincent Pérez as Jean-Baptiste
- Linh Dan Pham as Camille
- Jean Yanne as Guy
- Dominique Blanc as Yvette
- Henri Marteau as Émile
- Kieu Chinh as Mme. Minh Tam
- Eric Nguyen as Thanh
- Jean-Baptiste Huynh as Étienne
- Carlo Brandt as Castellani
- Hubert Saint-Macary as Raymond
- Andrzej Seweryn as Hébrard
- Thibault de Montalembert as Charles-Henri
- Như Quỳnh as Sao

== Production ==
The film was shot mainly in Imperial City, Hue, Ha Long (Ha Long Bay) and Ninh Binh (Phát Diệm Cathedral) in Vietnam. Butterworth in Malaysia was used as a substitute for Saigon, and Éliane Devries' "Lang-Sai" plantation house was actually Crag Hotel in Penang, Malaysia. Some parts were filmed in Cheong Fatt Tze Mansion, in George Town, Penang. Principal photography began on 8 April 1991 and concluded on 22 August 1991.

== Release ==
=== Box office ===
The film received a total of 3,198,663 cinema-goers in France, making it the 6th most attended film of the year. The film also grossed $5,603,158 in North America.

=== Critical reception ===
On review aggregator website Rotten Tomatoes, Indochine holds an approval rating of 75%, based on 20 reviews, and an average rating of 6.4/10.

Critics' reviews praised the film's photography and scenery, while citing issues with the plot and character development. Roger Ebert wrote the film "intends to be the French 'Gone with the Wind,' a story of romance and separation, told against the backdrop of a ruinous war". He continued "'Indochine' is an ambitious, gorgeous missed opportunity – too slow, too long, too composed. It is not a successful film, and yet there is so much good in it that perhaps it's worth seeing anyway…The beauty, the photography, the impact of the scenes shot on location in Vietnam, are all striking.“

Rita Kempley of The Washington Post found the transformation of Camille from a naive, pampered innocent to Communist revolutionary to be a compelling plot line, but noted, "The trouble is we never see the fragile teenager undergo this surprising metamorphosis. Director Regis Wargnier seems far more interested in what the white folks are doing back on the plantation". She commented further, "Wargnier, who learned his craft at the elbow of Claude Chabrol, does expose the geographic splendors of Southeast Asia as well as the common sense of its people, whose sly observations lend 'Indochine' both energy and levity".

Of the film's metaphorical mother-daughter relationship between Éliane and her adopted Vietnamese daughter Camille, Nick Davis said “Indochine's allegorical intentions actually play much better than the specific dramas enacted among its characters", adding "While Eliane-as-Establishment, Jean-Baptiste-as-Rebellious-Lower-Class-Youth, and Camille-as-Uneasy Cultural Mixture seem to follow the historical pattern of France's relationship with Indochina, their interactions only make sense to the extent they are interpreted as solely symbolic figures".

=== Accolades ===
Award	Category	Nominee(s)	Result
20/20 Awards	Best Foreign Language Film		Nominated
Academy Awards	Best Foreign Language Film		Won
Academy Awards	Best Actress	Catherine Deneuve	Nominated
Awards Circuit Community Awards	Best Actress in a Leading Role	Catherine Deneuve	Nominated
British Academy Film Awards	Best Film Not in the English Language	Eric Heumann and Régis Wargnier	Nominated
César Awards	Best Film	Régis Wargnier	Nominated
César Awards	Best Director	Régis Wargnier	Nominated
César Awards	Best Actress	Catherine Deneuve	Won
César Awards	Best Supporting Actor	Jean Yanne	Nominated
César Awards	Best Supporting Actress	Dominique Blanc	Won
César Awards	Most Promising Actress	Linh Dan Pham	Nominated
César Awards	Best Cinematography	François Catonné	Won
César Awards	Best Costume Design	Pierre-Yves Gayraud and Gabriella Pescucci	Nominated
César Awards	Best Editing	Geneviève Winding	Nominated
César Awards	Best Original Music	Patrick Doyle	Nominated
César Awards	Best Production Design	Jacques Bufnoir	Won
César Awards	Best Sound	Dominique Hennequin and Guillaume Sciama	Won
Dallas-Fort Worth Film Critics Association Awards	Best Foreign Language Film		Won
Golden Globe Awards	Best Foreign Language Film		Won
Goya Awards	Best European Film		Won
National Board of Review Awards	Top Five Foreign Language Films		Won
National Board of Review Awards	Best Foreign Language Film		Won
New York Film Critics Circle Awards	Best Foreign Language Film		3rd Place
Political Film Society Awards	Democracy		Won
Political Film Society Awards	Human Rights		Nominated

- The film was selected for screening as part of the Cannes Classics section at the 2016 Cannes Film Festival.

== See also ==
- List of submissions to the 65th Academy Awards for Best Foreign Language Film
- List of French submissions for the Academy Award for Best Foreign Language Film
