= Ed Gein =

American murderer and body snatcher (1906–1984)

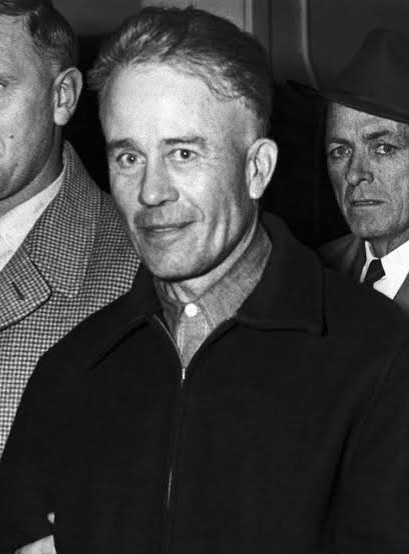
- Gein, c. 1958
- Born: Edward Theodore Gein; August 27, 1906; La Crosse County, Wisconsin, U.S.
- Died: July 26, 1984 (aged 77); Madison, Wisconsin, U.S.
- Resting place: Plainfield Cemetery
- Other names: The Plainfield Ghoul; The Plainfield Butcher; The Butcher of Plainfield
- Occupations: Handyman, farmer
- Status: Deceased
- Conviction: First degree murder (later found legally insane)
- Penalty: Institutionalized in the Mendota Mental Health Institute

Details
- Victims: 2 murders confirmed; 7 others suspected; 9 corpses mutilated (obtained from desecrated graves)
- Span of crimes: 1947–1957
- Country: United States
- State: Wisconsin
- Date apprehended: November 16, 1957

Edward Theodore Gein (/ɡiːn/ GEEN; August 27, 1906 – July 26, 1984), also known as the Butcher of Plainfield and the Plainfield Ghoul, was an American murderer and body snatcher. His crimes, committed around his hometown of Plainfield, Wisconsin, gathered widespread notoriety in 1957 after authorities discovered that he stole corpses from local graveyards and fashioned keepsakes from their bones and skin. He also confessed to killing two women: tavern owner Mary Hogan in 1954 and hardware store owner Bernice Worden in 1957.

Gein was initially found unfit to stand trial and confined to a mental health facility. By 1968, he was judged competent to stand trial. He was found guilty of the murder of Worden, but was found legally insane and thus was remanded to a psychiatric institution.

== Early life ==
=== Childhood ===
Edward Theodore Gein was born in La Crosse County, Wisconsin, on August 27, 1906, the second of two sons to George Philip Gein (1873–1940) and Augusta Wilhelmine Gein (née Lehrke; 1878–1945), both of German descent. Gein's only sibling was an older brother named Henry. Augusta, who was fervently religious and nominally Lutheran, frequently preached to her sons about the innate immorality of the world, the evils of drinking and her belief that all women were naturally promiscuous and instruments of the Devil. She reserved time every afternoon to read to them from the Bible, usually selecting verses from the Old Testament and the Book of Revelation concerning death, murder, and divine retribution. Gein idolized and eventually became obsessed with his mother.

In La Crosse, Gein's father worked as a carpenter, tanner, and firefighter. He also owned a local grocery store but soon sold the business and left the city with his family to live on a 155-acre (63-hectare) farm in the town of Plainfield, Wisconsin, which became their permanent residence. Gein's father was known to be a violent alcoholic who regularly beat both of his sons. This caused Ed's ears to ring when his father beat him on the head. Augusta took advantage of the farm's isolation by turning away outsiders who could have influenced her sons.

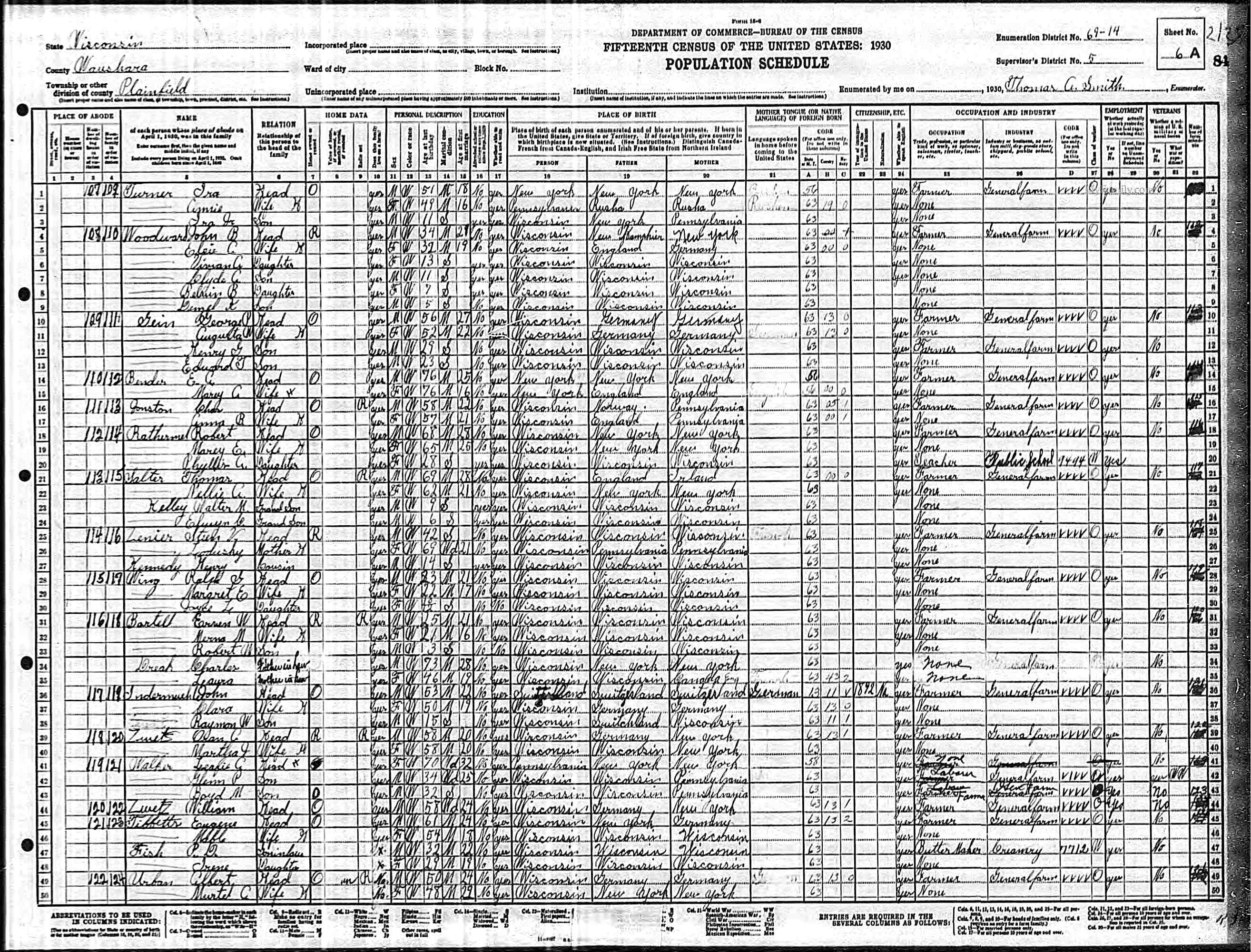
The 1930 US census with Gein, 13th name from the top, in Plainfield, Wisconsin

Gein left the farm only to attend school. Outside of school, he spent most of his time doing chores on the farm. Gein was shy. Classmates and teachers remembered him as having strange mannerisms, such as seemingly random laughter, as if he were laughing at his own personal jokes. Augusta punished Gein whenever he tried to make friends, according to family acquaintances. Despite his poor social development, Gein did fairly well in school, particularly in reading.

=== Deaths in immediate family ===
On April 1, 1940, George Gein died of heart failure at the age of 66. Ed and Henry began doing odd jobs around town to help cover living expenses. The brothers were generally considered reliable and honest by the rest of the community. While both worked as handymen, Ed frequently babysat for neighbors, seeming to relate more easily to children than to adults. Henry began dating a divorced mother of two and planned to move in with her. He worried about his brother's attachment to their mother and often spoke ill of her around Ed, who responded with shock and hurt.

On May 16, 1944, Henry was burning vegetation on the property. The fire got out of control, requiring intervention by the local fire department. By the end of the day—the fire having been extinguished and the firefighters gone—Ed reported Henry missing. With lanterns and flashlights, a search party searched for 43-year-old Henry, whose dead body was found lying face down. Apparently, Henry had been dead for some time, and it appeared that the cause of death was heart failure, since he had not been burned or injured otherwise.

It was later reported by biographer Harold Schechter that Henry had bruises on his head. Police dismissed the possibility of foul play, and the county coroner later listed asphyxiation as the cause of death. The authorities accepted the accident theory, but no official investigation was conducted, and an autopsy was not performed. Questioning Ed about the death of Bernice Worden in 1957, state investigator Joe Wilimovsky brought up questions about Henry's death. George Arndt, who studied the case, wrote that, in retrospect, it was "possible and likely" that Henry's death was "the 'Cain and Abel' aspect of this case."

With Henry deceased, Ed and his mother were now alone. Augusta suffered a paralyzing stroke shortly after Henry's death, and Ed devoted himself to her care. In 1945, he later recounted, he and his mother visited a man named Smith, who lived nearby, to purchase straw. According to Gein, Augusta witnessed Smith beating a dog. A woman inside the Smith residence came outside and yelled for him to stop, but Smith beat the dog to death. Augusta was extremely upset by this scene; what bothered her did not appear to be the brutality toward the dog but, rather, the presence of the woman. Augusta told Gein that the woman was not married to Smith and so had no business being there, angrily calling her "Smith's harlot." She suffered a second stroke soon after, and her health deteriorated rapidly.

Augusta died on December 29, 1945, at the age of 67. Gein was devastated by his mother's death. In the words of Schechter, he had "lost his only friend and one true love. And he was absolutely alone in the world".

== Work ==
Gein held onto the farm and earned money from odd jobs. He boarded up rooms used by his mother, including the upstairs, the downstairs parlor, and the living room, leaving them untouched. While the rest of the house became increasingly squalid, these rooms remained pristine. Gein lived in a small room next to the kitchen. Around this time, he became interested in reading pulp magazines and adventure stories, particularly those involving cannibals or Nazi atrocities, specifically concerning Ilse Koch, who had been accused of selecting tattooed prisoners for death to fashion lampshades and other items from their skins.

In 1951, Gein started receiving a farm subsidy from the federal government. He occasionally worked for the local municipal road crew and crop-threshing crews in the Plainfield area. Sometime between 1946 and 1956, he sold an 80-acre (32 ha) parcel of land that Henry had owned.

== Crimes ==
=== Confirmed ===
On the morning of November 16, 1957, 58-year-old Plainfield hardware store owner Bernice Worden disappeared. The hardware store's truck was seen driving out from the rear of the building at around 9:30 a.m. The store saw few customers the entire day; some area residents believed that this was because of deer hunting season. Worden's son, Deputy Sheriff Frank Worden, entered the store around 5:00 p.m. to find the cash register open and blood stains on the floor.

Frank Worden told investigators that on the evening before his mother's disappearance, Gein had been in the store and was expected to return the next morning for a gallon of antifreeze. A sales slip for the antifreeze was the last receipt written by Bernice Worden on the morning that she disappeared. That evening, Gein was arrested at a West Plainfield (Note: West Plainfield was an unincorporated community three miles (4.8 km) west of the center of Plainfield at 44.213931°N 89.552818°W, which has since diminished and disappeared.) grocery store, and the Waushara County Sheriff's Department searched the Gein farm.

A sheriff's deputy discovered Worden's decapitated body in a shed on Gein's property, hung upside down by her legs with a crossbar at her ankles and ropes at her wrists. The torso had been "dressed out like a deer". Worden had been shot with a .22-caliber rifle, and mutilations were made after her death. Searching Gein's house, authorities found:

- Whole human bones and fragments
- A wastebasket made of human skin
- Human skin covering several chairs
- Human skulls mounted on bedposts
- Female skulls, some with the tops sawn off
- Bowls made from human skulls
- A corset made from a female torso skinned from shoulders to waist
- Leggings made from human leg skin
- Masks made from the skin of female heads
- Mary Hogan's face mask in a paper bag
- Mary Hogan's skull in a box
- Bernice Worden's entire head in a burlap sack
- Bernice Worden's heart "in a plastic bag in front of Gein's potbelly stove"
- Nine vulvas in a shoebox
- A young girl's dress and "the vulvas of two females judged to have been about fifteen years old"
- A belt made from female human nipples
- Four noses
- A pair of lips on a window shade drawstring
- A lampshade made from the skin of a human face

These artifacts were photographed at the state crime laboratory and then "decently disposed of". When questioned, Gein told investigators that between 1947 and 1952, he had made as many as forty nocturnal visits to three local graveyards to exhume recently buried bodies while he was in a "daze-like" state. On about thirty of those visits, he said that he came out of the daze while in the cemetery, left the grave in good order, and returned home empty-handed. On the other occasions, he dug up the graves of recently buried middle-aged women he thought resembled his mother and took the bodies home, where he tanned their skins to make his paraphernalia.

Gein admitted to stealing from nine graves and led investigators to them. Allan Wilimovsky of the state crime laboratory participated in opening three test graves identified by Gein. The caskets were inside wooden boxes. The top boards ran crossways, not lengthwise. The tops of the boxes were about two feet (61 centimeters) below the surface in sandy soil. Gein had robbed the graves soon after the funerals, while the graves were incomplete. The test graves were exhumed because authorities were uncertain as to whether the slight Gein was capable of single-handedly digging up a grave during an evening. They were found as Gein described: one casket was empty; another casket was empty but contained a few bones and Gein's crowbar, and the final casket had most of the body missing yet Gein had returned rings and some body parts. Thus, Gein's confession was largely corroborated.

Soon after his mother's death, Gein began to create a "woman suit" so that "he could become his mother—to literally crawl into her skin." He denied having sex with the bodies he exhumed, explaining: "They smelled too bad." During the state crime laboratory interrogation, Gein admitted to shooting 51-year-old Mary Hogan, a tavern owner who had been missing since December 8, 1954. Her head was later found in his house, though he denied any memory of the details surrounding her death.

A 16-year-old youth, whose parents were friends of Gein and who attended baseball games and movies with him, reported that Gein kept shrunken heads in his house, which he had described as relics sent by a cousin who had served in the Philippines during World War II. Upon investigation by police, these were determined to be human facial skins, carefully peeled from corpses and used by Gein as masks.

During questioning, Sheriff Art Schley reportedly assaulted Gein by banging his head and face into a brick wall. As a result, Gein's initial confession was ruled inadmissible. Schley died of heart failure in 1968 at the age of 43, before Gein's trial. Many who knew Schley said he was traumatized by the horror of Gein's crimes and this, along with the fear of having to testify, especially about assaulting Gein, caused his death.

=== Suspected ===
Gein was considered a suspect in several other unsolved cases in Wisconsin. In November 1957, authorities confronted Gein with missing persons cases that had occurred between the death of his mother and that of Worden. Their suspicions were further aroused after the discovery of Hogan's remains. Lie detector tests failed to implicate Gein of any other murders, and his psychiatrists concluded that his violence was only directed to women who physically resembled his mother.

- Georgia Jean Weckler (8) disappeared near her home in Fort Atkinson at approximately 3:30 p.m. on May 1, 1947. She was given a lift home from grade school in Jefferson by a neighbor, who dropped Weckler off at the lane that led from U.S. Highway 12 to the Weckler farm. Weckler was last seen pausing to open the family mailbox and removing a stack of mail. Witnesses reported seeing a dark-colored, possibly black, 1936 Ford sedan with a gray plastic spotlight in the vicinity that afternoon. Gein owned a black 1937 Ford.
- Evelyn Grace Hartley (14) went missing while babysitting a 20-month-old girl at the home of La Crosse State College professor Viggo Rasmussen on the evening of October 24, 1953. That evening, her father Richard called the Rasmussen residence several times after she failed to check in as planned at 8:30 p.m.; he received no answer. Concerned, he drove to the Rasmussen house to find the doors were locked, the lights and radio on and items scattered all over the house. The living room furniture had been moved around to different places, as were Evelyn's school books. Richard found her shoes in different rooms, one shoe upstairs and one downstairs. He found his daughter's broken glasses upstairs. Richard did not find Evelyn in the house. After his arrest, Gein was questioned regarding Hartley's disappearance, but he denied involvement and passed two lie detector tests. Police found no trace of Hartley's remains during a search of Gein's property.
- Victor Harold Travis (42), a resident of Adams County, went off to hunt deer in the company of acquaintance Raymond Burgess on November 1, 1952. In the late afternoon, the pair stopped for refreshments at Mac's Bar in Plainfield for several hours. At around 7 p.m., they both left the bar, got into Burgess' car and drove away. The hunters, along with the car Burgess was driving, were never seen again, and no trace of them was ever found. Travis and Burgess had been hunting on the property next to Gein's farm, despite his objections to them hunting on the day of their disappearance.
- Gein has been tentatively linked to the June 1954 disappearance of his neighbor James Walsh (32). Walsh and his wife lived near Gein, who performed chores for Mrs. Walsh after her husband went missing.

== Aftermath ==
=== Trial ===
On November 21, 1957, Gein was arraigned on one count of first-degree murder in Waushara County Court, where he pleaded not guilty by reason of insanity. He was diagnosed with schizophrenia and found mentally incompetent, thus unfit for trial. Gein was sent to the Central State Hospital for the Criminally Insane, now Dodge Correctional Institution, a maximum-security facility in Waupun, and was later transferred to the Mendota Mental Health Institute in Madison.

In 1968, doctors determined Gein was "mentally able to confer with counsel and participate in his defense". The trial began on November 7, 1968, and lasted one week. A psychiatrist testified that Gein had told him that he did not know whether the killing of Worden was intentional or accidental. Gein told him that while he examined a gun in Worden's store, the weapon discharged and killed Worden. He claimed to not have aimed the rifle at Worden, and did not remember anything else that happened that morning.

At the request of the defense, Gein's trial was held without a jury, with Judge Robert H. Gollmar presiding. Gein was found guilty by Gollmar on November 14. A second trial dealt with Gein's sanity. After testimony by doctors for the prosecution and defense, Gollmar ruled Gein "not guilty by reason of insanity" and ordered him committed to Central State Hospital for the Criminally Insane. Gein spent the rest of his life in a mental hospital. Judge Gollmar wrote, "Due to prohibitive costs, Gein was tried for only one murder—that of Mrs. Worden. He also admitted to killing Mary Hogan."

=== Fate of Gein's property ===
Gein's house, the outbuildings, and his 195-acre (79 ha) property were appraised at $4,700, equivalent to $52,000 in 2025. His possessions were scheduled to be auctioned on March 30, 1958, amidst rumors that the house and the land it stood on might become a tourist attraction. Early on the morning of March 20, the house was destroyed by fire. A deputy fire marshal reported that a garbage fire had been set 75 feet (23 m) from the house by a cleaning crew, which was given the task of disposing of refuse; that hot coals were recovered from the spot of the bonfire, but that the fire did not spread along the ground from that location to the house. Arson was suspected, but the cause of the fire was never officially determined.

It is possible that the fire was not considered a matter of urgency to Fire Chief Frank Worden, the son of Gein's victim Bernice Worden. When Gein learned of the incident while in detention, he shrugged and said, "Just as well." Gein's Ford sedan, which he used to haul the bodies of his victims, was sold at public auction for $760 (equivalent to $8,500 in 2025) to carnival sideshow operator Bunny Gibbons, who charged carnival-goers 25¢ admission to see it. The car's current whereabouts are unknown.

=== Death ===
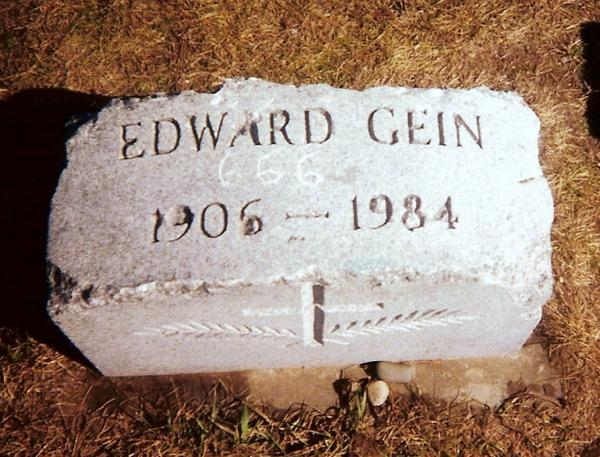
Gein's vandalized grave marker as it appeared in 1999 before thieves stole it

Gein died at the Mendota Mental Health Institute due to respiratory failure, secondary to lung cancer, on July 26, 1984, at the age of 77. Gein is interred between his parents and brother in Plainfield Cemetery. Over the years, souvenir seekers chipped away pieces from his gravestone until the stone itself was stolen in 2000. It was recovered in June 2001, near Seattle, Washington, and was placed in storage at the Waushara County Sheriff's Department. Since then, his gravesite has remained unmarked.

== In popular culture ==
Gein's story has been depicted widely in American popular culture via numerous appearances in film, music, and literature. The tale first came to widespread public attention in the fictionalized version presented by Robert Bloch in his 1959 suspense novel Psycho. In addition to Alfred Hitchcock's 1960 film adaptation of Bloch's novel of the same name, Gein's story was loosely adapted into numerous films, including Deranged (1974), The Texas Chainsaw Massacre (1974), Landscape Suicide (1987), In the Light of the Moon (2000) (released in the United States and Australia as Ed Gein [2001]), Ed Gein: The Butcher of Plainfield (2007), Ed Gein, the Musical (2010) and the Rob Zombie films House of 1000 Corpses (2003) and The Devil's Rejects (2005). Gein served as the inspiration for myriad fictional serial killers, most notably Norman Bates (Psycho), Leatherface (The Texas Chain Saw Massacre), Buffalo Bill (The Silence of the Lambs), Garland Greene (Con Air), and the character of Dr. Oliver Thredson in the TV series American Horror Story: Asylum.

American filmmaker Errol Morris and German filmmaker Werner Herzog tried to collaborate on a film project about Gein from 1975 to 1976. Morris claimed to have interviewed Gein several times and ended up spending almost a year in Plainfield interviewing dozens of locals. The pair planned secretly to exhume Gein's mother from her grave to test a theory, but never followed through on the scheme, and eventually ended their collaboration. The aborted project was described in a 1989 New Yorker profile of Morris. Gein's story inspired American grunge band Tad to write the song "Nipple Belt" for their 1989 album, God's Balls. Gein also inspired American thrash metal band Slayer to write the song "Dead Skin Mask" for their 1990 album, Seasons in the Abyss. Also, Blind Melon singer Shannon Hoon stated in interviews that the song "Skinned" on their 1995 album, Soup, was about Gein, and many of the crimes he committed. Additionally, Gein was the inspiration and namesake for the song "Nothing to Gein", by American heavy metal band Mudvayne; released in 2000 on their album, L.D. 50.

The character Patrick Bateman, in the 1991 novel American Psycho and its 2000 film adaptation, mistakenly attributes a quote by Edmund Kemper to Gein saying, "You know what Ed Gein said about women? ... He said, 'When I see a pretty girl walking down the street, I think two things. One part of me wants to take her out, talk to her, be real nice and sweet and treat her right ... [the other part wonders] what her head would look like on a stick'." In 2012, German director Jörg Buttgereit wrote and directed a stage play about Gein's case titled Kannibale und Liebe, at Theater Dortmund in Germany. The part of Gein was played by actor Uwe Rohbeck. According to George W. Arndt, news reports at the time of Gein's crimes spawned a subgenre of black humor called "Geiners." Gein was portrayed in flashbacks by Michael Wincott in the 2012 biographical film Hitchcock.

Gein was referenced in the Season 8 episode of the television show NCIS titled "One Last Score". In 2022, Gein was portrayed by Shane Kerwin in the first season of Netflix's anthology series Monster, where he was suggested as a possible inspiration for the crimes of serial killer Jeffrey Dahmer. However, any direct connection between the two remains speculative. The third season of the Ryan Murphy series, titled Monster: The Ed Gein Story, focused on Gein's life and crimes, with Charlie Hunnam cast in the lead role. The season was released on Netflix on October 3, 2025.

== See also ==
- Anatoly Moskvin – Russian body snatcher
- Body snatching – Secret removal of corpses from burial sites
- Carl Tanzler – German-born American radiology technologist and erotomaniac
- Grave robbery – Act of uncovering a tomb or crypt to steal artifacts or personal effects
- List of homicides in Wisconsin
- List of serial killers in the United States

== Bibliography ==
- Gollmar, Robert H. (1981). Edward Gein: America's Most Bizarre Murderer. Delavan, Wis: C. Hallberg. pp. 270. ISBN 978-0873190206.
- Schechter, Harold (1989). Deviant: The Shocking True Story of the Original 'Psycho'. New York: Pocket Books. p. 274. ISBN 978-0671644826. OCLC 40002199.
