= Music Box Theatre (Chicago) =

Movie theater in Chicago, Illinois

Coordinates: 41°56′58.7″N 87°39′49.5″W

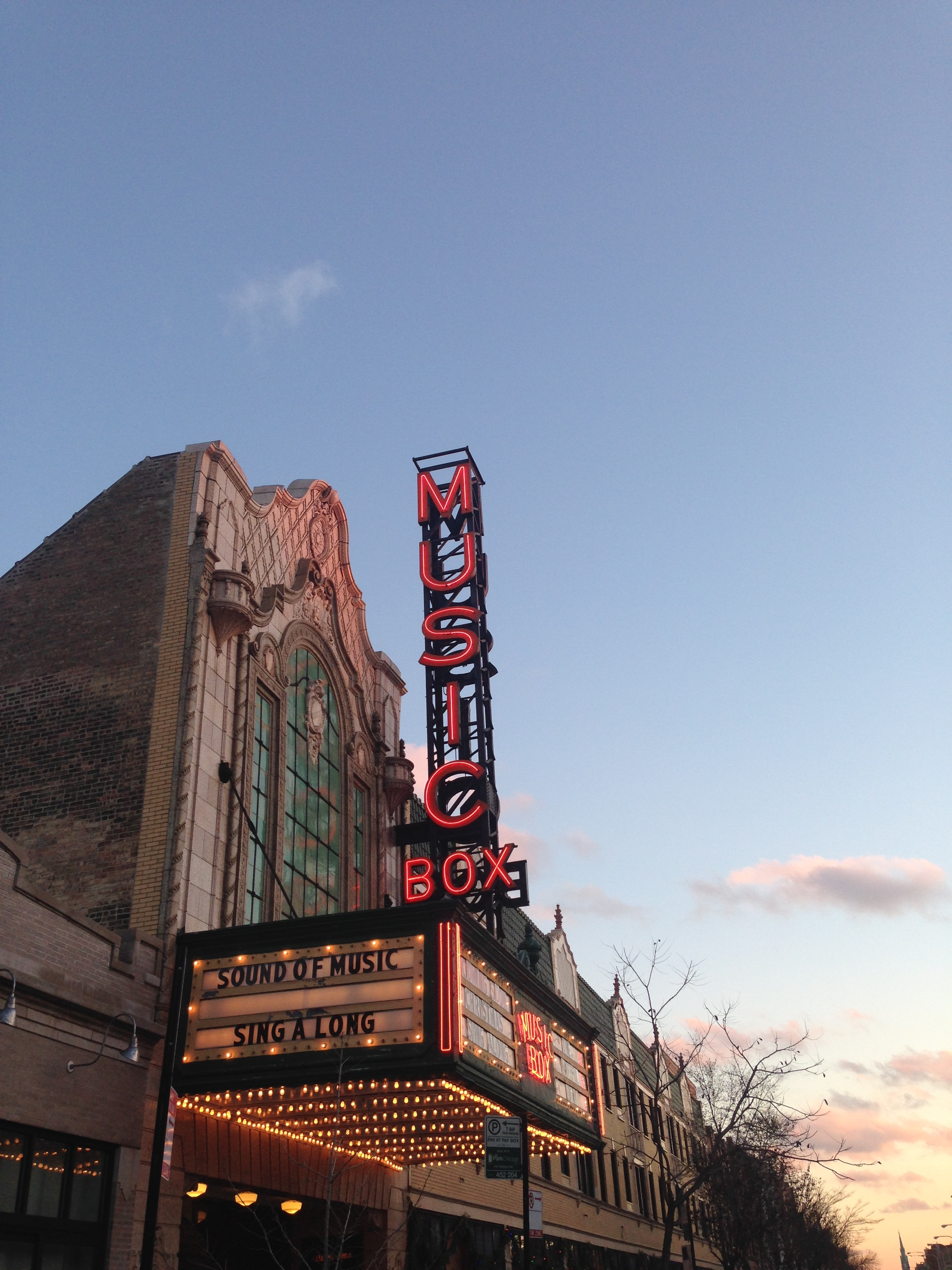
- Music Box Theatre in Chicago, December 2015
- Interactive map of Music Box Theatre
- Address: 3733 N. Southport Ave
- Location: Chicago, Illinois, United States
- Owner: Southport Music Box Corporation
- Capacity: Screen 1: 748 Screen 2: 75
- Type: Movie theater

Construction
- Built: 1920s
- Opened: 1929
- Renovated: 1983, 2013, 2018, 2024
- Expanded: 1991, 2015, 2026

Website
- www.musicboxtheatre.com

The Music Box Theatre is a historic movie theater located in Chicago, Illinois. Built in 1929, it has been operating continuously as an art-house and repertory cinema since the early 1980s.

== History ==
The Music Box opened on August 22, 1929 at 3733 North Southport Avenue as a single screen theater with a seating capacity of 750. The opening night film was Mother’s Boy. In 1931 the Music Box was one of several theaters bombed during an ongoing dispute between the Allied Independent Theaters' Association and the Motion Picture Operators' Union as the theater was employing non-union projectionists. Between 1977 and 1983, the Music Box was used sporadically for Spanish language films, pornographic films and Arabic language films. The theater was shuttered briefly until 1983 when Robert Chaney, Christopher Carlo and Stan Hightower formed the Music Box Theatre Corporation and restored and reopened the theater with a format of double feature revival and repertory films. Eventually, foreign films and independent and cult films were added to the roster and repertory screenings were moved to weekend matinee and midnight time slots.

=== Current operations ===
William Schopf (the building owner since 1986) took over operations of the theater in 2003. It has been independently owned and operated by the Southport Music Box Corporation since then. Southport Music Box Corporation also owns and operates Music Box Films, a distributor of foreign and independent films which began in 2007.

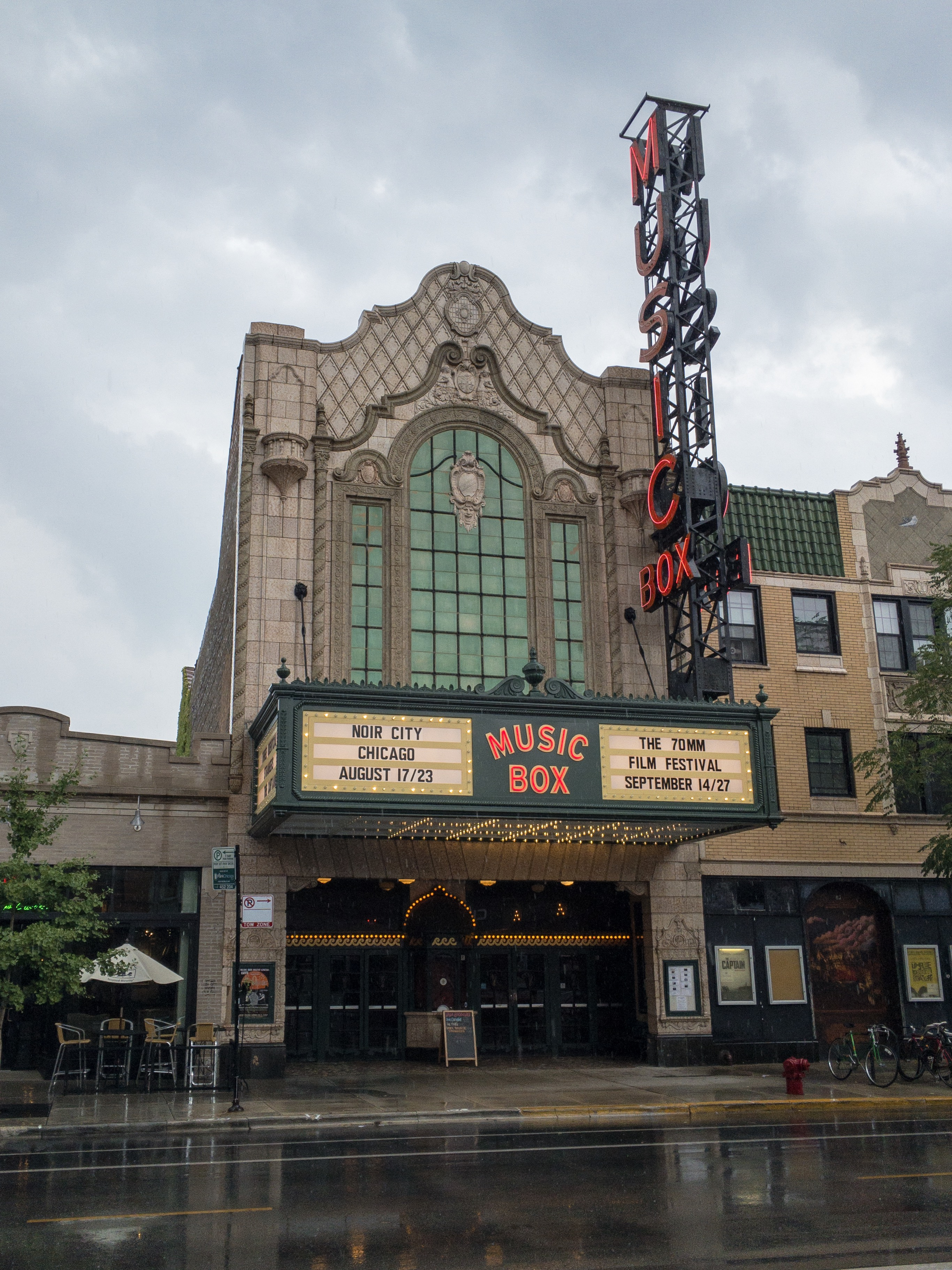
Music Box Theatre, August 2018. Lower marquee replaced.

=== Renovations ===
In 1991 a 100-seat theater was built in an existing storefront adjacent to the lobby, opening to the public on July 3 of that year. "Theatre 2" was remodeled in 2013 to accommodate new digital projection and audio systems, as well as a larger screen. Theatre acoustics were improved, replacement seats were installed, and some rows of seats were removed leaving it with a seating capacity of 75. A bar and lounge was added in 2015 in the storefront directly north of the original building. The lower portion of the marquee was replaced in 2018, it was designed to replicate the original. In 2026 a newly created Theater 3 was built and opened.

== Architecture ==
Theatre Architecture magazine noted in 1929 that the theatre "represents the smaller, though charming and well equipped, sound picture theatre which is rapidly taking the place of the 'deluxe' palace." The entire building, which also included nine storefronts and 32 apartments, cost an estimated $300,000. Edward Steinborn and Louis I. Simon are credited as the original architects. It was erected by The Blaine Building Corporation (the theater was originally going to be called The New Blaine Theater) and operated by Jacob Lasker and son, who operated several smaller neighborhood houses in Chicago, including the Bertha Theater and the Villas Theater.

As Chicago Tribune architectural critic Paul Gapp wrote (Arts and Books, July 31, 1983), "The architectural style is an eclectic mélange of Italian, Spanish and Pardon-My-Fantasy put together with passion." The actual style is called atmospheric. The dark blue, cove-lit ceiling with "twinkling stars" and moving cloud formations suggests a night sky. The plaster ornamentation of the sidewalls, round towers, faux-marble loggia and ogee arched organ chambers are, by Hollywood standards, reminiscent of the walls surrounding an Italian courtyard. The overall effect is to make the patron feel that they are watching a film in an open-air palazzo.

George Schutz, in an article written for Exhibitor's Herald-World in 1929, praised the theater for its small size and lack of frills and "non-cinematic elements" often found in the much larger movie palaces of the day. “It is entirely competent, both in design and equipment, to function as a hall in which to present the highly special kind of mechanized entertainment which is the modern motion-talking picture.” He also mentions the cracked colored tile floor, "a variegated broken faience tile floor of simple, lasting beauty and great durability", which is still maintained to this day, and "a built-in decorative fountain, in the basin of which swim gold fish”, which no longer contains gold fish.

=== Technical capabilities ===
Film presentation capabilities at The Music Box in the main theater are 16mm film, 35mm film (1.19:1, 1.33:1, 1.37:1, 1.66:1, 1.85:1 and Cinemascope aspect ratios), 70mm film, and digital projection. The sound systems are Laser optical, DTS, Dolby, Dolby Digital. Theater two has 35mm film and digital projection capabilities.

In the early 1980s, when Robert Chaney, Christopher Carlo, and Stan Hightower restored the theater, friends Fred Georges & Mike Reinhart came onboard to restore the projection booth with upgrades to the original 35mm projectors. The projectors were disconnected from the long obsolete motor-driven DC dynamo power generators which powered very obsolete carbon arc lamps with newer solid-state power supplies and replaced the ancient arc lamps with a newer high intensity Xenon lamp technology. They also replaced the non-working tube audio amplifiers with sold-state amplifiers.

The new owners then installed a 16mm projector and Reinhart rewired it for sound.

Georges synchronized the two main projector motors for dual left eye-right eye projection to allow for the screening of 3D movies.

For a special scary movie showing called "The Tingler" staring Vincent Price, Reinhart built a control box which was wired to many buzzers that vibrated the audience seats when the "Tingler" got loose in the theater.

== Programming and festivals ==
Since 1993 The Music Box has been screening weekly first-run features along with repertory films, Saturday & Sunday matinees, and midnight cult films on Friday & Saturday nights. Since 1983 the Music Box has been showing White Christmas and It's A Wonderful Life along with pre-show Sing-a-Longs with the Music Box House organist and "Santa". Newer traditions adopted by The Music Box are a 24-hour horror movie film festival in October known as "The Music Box of Horrors," formerly "The Music Box Massacre", a 70mm film festival, and yearly screenings of 2001: A Space Odyssey on 70mm. The Music Box has been screening Rocky Horror Picture Show since the early 1980s accompanied by a shadowcast of actors from the local Chicago theatre troupe Midnight Madness.

=== Silent films ===
When the theatre was built, sound films were a new technology and the theater was built with the intention of screening sound films. However, the plans included both an orchestra pit and organ chambers if sound films failed and silent film accompaniment was needed. Photos of the theater in the year it was built show "Western Electric Sound System" and "Vitaphone" advertised on the marquee. The first known silent film presentation at the Music Box theatre was "Wings" in 1983 using the operators home theatre organ and accompanied by Barbara Sellers, the daughter of Preston and Edna Sellers who were Chicago Silent Film and radio theatre organ personalities of the 1920s – 1940s. The first Theatre organ – an Allen three manual electronic – was installed in the previously empty organ chambers, in 1984. The Music Box has continued to screen silent films with live organ accompaniment monthly since 2012.

== Sources ==
- Theatre Architecture Magazine, 1929, UCLA B’hend-Kaufman archives
- Cinema Treasures, Ross Meinick and Andreas Fuchs, MBI Press 2004 ,
- Chicago: City of Neighborhoods by Dominic Pacyga and Ellen Skerrett, Loyola University Press 1986
- Great American Movie Theaters, David Naylor, Preservation Press 1986
- Entertainment Weekly, June 28, 1991 issue #72-3
- Chicago Tribune, Music Box Theatre by Paul Gapp, August.1983
- Theatre Historical Society of America, http://www.historictheatres.org/
