= Centre for Social Justice Awards =

Annual awards event in Britain

- Awarded for: Excellence in poverty relief
- Venue: Methodist Central Hall, Westminster
- Presented by: Centre for Social Justice
- Website: http://centreforsocialjustice.org.uk/

The CSJ Awards are an annual event organised by the Centre for Social Justice, a centre-right British political thinktank, where grants are awarded to organisations working in the field of poverty relief. In 2009, a Channel 4 documentary series was made by filmmaker and TV presenter Sadie Kaye about the award nominees which also featured interviews with the Rt. Hon. Iain Duncan Smith and awards host Esther Rantzen.

== 2006 Awards ==
The 2006 award ceremony was held on the 28 June 2006 at Central Hall in Westminster, London for awarding grants totalling £25,000 to a number of the 12 short-listed charities nominated that year. The short-listed charities were also invited to join the CSJ Alliance, a grouping of charities who work in similar fields and wish to cooperate with each other.

== 2005 Awards ==
The following organisations won grants at the 2005 awards ceremony:

- ADAS UK (£5000) - providing abstinence-based addiction rehabilitation in Stockport
- Bristol Community Family Trust (£3000) - engaged in relationship education and parenting classes
- Eden Failsworth - a Christian youth project in a deprived area of Manchester
- Emmaus UK (£1000) - supporting ten communities throughout Britain helping former homeless people
- Protest 4 (£3000) - campaign against people-trafficking

A local authority award (no money) was also made to Salford City Council for its highly developed relationship with voluntary groups as part of its efforts to tackle poverty.
