= Centre for Social Justice =

British thinktank

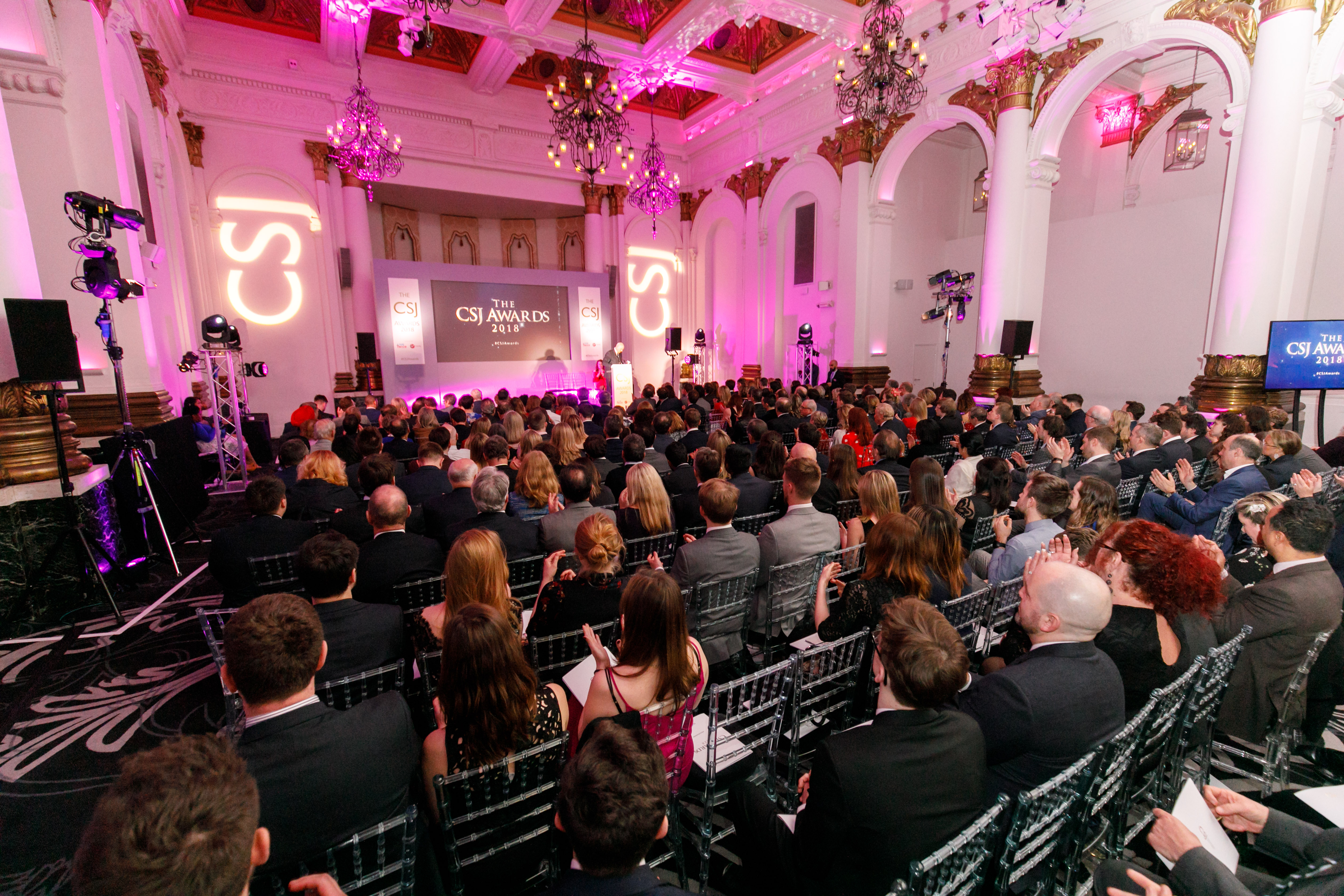
- Formation: 2004; 22 years ago
- Type: Thinktank
- Legal status: Company limited by guarantee (non-profit)
- Location: London, United Kingdom
- Chief executive: Andy Cook
- Budget: Approximately £1.6 million
- Staff: 24
- Website: centreforsocialjustice.org.uk

The Centre for Social Justice (CSJ) is an independent think tank based in the United Kingdom, co-founded in 2004 by politicians Iain Duncan Smith, Tim Montgomerie, and Philippa Stroud.

== Political positions ==
The organisation's stated aim is to "put social justice at the heart of British politics". While the think-tank states it is politically independent, it was labelled one of the most influential on the British Conservative Party under the leadership of David Cameron.

== Policy programmes and impact ==
One of the CSJ's most notable reports was Breakthrough Britain. It has also produced reports on gang culture, modern slavery, addiction, family breakdown, and educational failure. In 2012 the CSJ announced that it would carry out the study Breakthrough Britain II. The CSJ has also played important roles in the design and development of Universal Credit and in championing the introduction of the Modern Slavery Act 2015.

=== 2017 ===
- A report recommended placing homeless people dealing with problems such as alcohol and drug abuse in permanent accommodation and giving them access to care and training. The approach, known as Housing First, had been tried out in the United States and adopted by Finland with positive results. Conservative Communities Secretary Sajid Javid had said that he was keen to examine the scheme. While the CSJ called for a nationwide roll-out of Housing First, the Government announced and allocated £28M funding for a number of Housing First pilot sites in the West Midlands, Liverpool and Manchester. A further report on Housing First was published in 2025.
- A report titled Growing the Local called on the government to give Police and Crime Commissioners additional flexibility to increase the police precept, a set of proposals subsequently adopted and providing additional resources for policing and crime.
- A report titled Lowering the Stake on Fixed Odds Betting Terminals called on the government to reduce the maximum stake from £100 to £2 for fixed odds betting terminals. The government implemented the recommended change in 2018.

=== 2018 ===
- A Woman-Centred Approach called on the government to scrap plans for up to five new women's prisons and to put funds towards community-based alternatives. The Ministry of Justice subsequently announced that plans for new women's prisons were being abandoned and set out proposals to pilot five residential centres for women in the community.

=== 2019 ===
- A statement called on the government to increase the state pension age to 75.

=== 2026 ===
- A statement called on the government to cut welfare spending to fund an increase of defence spending to 3% of GDP.

== Structure and operation ==
Initially, the CSJ operated on a project-based model in which both projects and staff changed frequently. Under chief executive Andy Cook, the organisation has established permanent policy units, each led by a designated head.

The CSJ coordinates an alliance of charities that address poverty and hosts the annual Centre for Social Justice Awards, which recognise voluntary and non-profit organisations throughout the United Kingdom. It also stages events at the main UK political party conferences.

== Notable members ==
Past and present:

- Iain Duncan Smith MP, leader of the Conservative Party 2001-2003
- Tim Montgomerie, founder of the ConservativeHome website and former adviser to Boris Johnson
- David Blunkett MP, co-chairman of the CSJ Advisory Council
- Johan Eliasch, chairman and chief exec, Head N.V; Chairman, Cool Earth; Prime Minister's Special representative on deforestation and clean energy
- Frank Field MP, former Member of Parliament for Birkenhead (Independent)
- William Hague MP, former foreign secretary, former leader of the Conservative Party, former member of parliament for Richmond, Yorkshire (Conservative)
- Syed Kamall MEP, co-founder of Global Business Research institute, MEP for London (Conservative)
- Paul Marshall, hedge fund manager and owner of GB News and The Spectator
- Kevin Tebbit, former director of GCHQ and former permanent under secretary of the Ministry of Defence
- Natalia Grosvenor, Duchess of Westminster
- Claire Coutinho MP, former Secretary of State for Energy Security and Net Zero

== Funding ==
In September 2023, the funding transparency website Who Funds You? gave the CSJ a D grade, the second-lowest transparency rating (rating goes from A to E).

== See also ==
- List of UK Thinktanks
- Modern Slavery Act 2015
- Universal Credit (welfare reform programme)
