= West of Thunder =

2012 film

West of Thunder is a 2012 American independent Western film produced by Sunka Wakan Dragonfly Film Studios.

== Cast ==
The film stars Dan Davies as Henry Seed, co-starring Corbin Conroy, Clifford Henry, Crispian Belfrage, Sadie Kaye, Michael Worth and Raffaello Degruttola.

== Crew ==
Jody Marriott Bar-Lev produced and co-directs the film with Steve Russell. Bar-Lev co-wrote the film with Dan Davies. Michael Blake was the film's Creative Advisor and John Stanier is the film's Director of Photography.

== Production ==
The film was shot in Los Angeles and on location in the Badlands of South Dakota 2011-2012. It premiered in New York July 2012, followed by Los Angeles in September 2012.

== Reception ==
In his review of the film for the Los Angeles Times Mark Olsen wrote: "... "West of Thunder" is a strangely earnest revenge picture, a kindhearted Western with its fair share of killing. ... Directed by Jody Marriott Bar-Lev (also a co-writer) and Steve Russell (also co-cinematographer with John Stanier), the film feels not so much amateurish as homespun, made with a sincerity that smoothes over at least some of its rough edges."

Kristina Bravo of The Village Voice considered: "West of Thunder is 84 minutes of an extended high school drama-class project that includes history lessons, incongruous literature lectures, and much awkward dialogue interspersed with shots of natural landscape and sprinting animals. ...it becomes increasingly hard to take what is unraveling as a serious film."

Shelli Sonstein of New York's Q104.3 FM remarked: "...it's a really unusual movie ...with an interesting twist. There is a spiritual voice in this movie that I had not heard before or seen before in a movie, so it's done in a really creative way. It reminds us of our history and it also reminds us of the reality of today for the Lakota...very educational."

== Awards ==
The film was in the final selection for the 2012 Toronto International Film Festival. In October 2012 it was nominated for "Best Film on Human Rights" and "Best Film on Peace" by the USA Political Film Society. The film headlined the Red Nation Film Festival in Los Angeles and the American Indian Festival in San Francisco November 2012.
