= Mulberry Child =

- Film poster
- Directed by: Susan Morgan Cooper
- Based on: Mulberry Child by Jian Ping
- Produced by: Susan Morgan Cooper (producer); Jian Ping (associate producer)
- Starring: Jian Ping; Lisa Ping
- Narrated by: Jacqueline Bisset
- Cinematography: Quyen Tran
- Edited by: Sean Villa
- Music by: Kyle Eastwood; Matt McGuire
- Distributed by: Women Make Movies; TVF International
- Release date: October 16, 2011 (Heartland Film Festival)
- Running time: 85 minutes
- Country: United States
- Language: English

Mulberry Child is a 2011 documentary film that was written and directed by Susan Morgan Cooper, based on the book by the same name by Jian Ping. It had its world premiere on October 16, 2011 at the Heartland Film Festival and features Jacqueline Bisset as the movie's narrator.

== Synopsis ==
The documentary follows Jian Ping and her daughter Lisa as they travel to the 2008 Beijing Olympics. Jian grew up during the Chinese Cultural Revolution and with her family, underwent severe difficulties. When Jian and her family moved to the United States, they had to adapt to the culture shock they experienced from traveling from a socialist society to a capitalist one. Years later, Jian has experienced a sort of disconnect with her daughter Lisa, who grew up in the United States and does not share in her mother's past experiences. As the two travel together to Beijing for the Olympics, the two hope that this will bring the two of them closer as a family.

== Cast ==
- Jacqueline Bisset as narrator
- Jian Ping as herself
- Lisa Xia as herself

== Reception ==
Critical reception for Mulberry Child has been mixed and the film has a rating of 33% on Rotten Tomatoes (based on 6 reviews) and 54 on Metacritic (based on 4 reviews). The Los Angeles Times panned the movie, writing that "an awkward mix of real events and reenactments undermines the story of a family's struggle to survive". In contrast, Roger Ebert praised Mulberry Child and gave it 3 1/2 out of 4 stars, stating "There's a universal story here about immigrant parents and children, and how American culture can swamp family traditions, and make parents and children culturally unrecognizable to one another."

=== Awards ===
- Best Editing at the Madrid International Documentary Film Festival (2012, won)
- Best of the Fest at the Palm Springs International Film Festival
- Best Documentary at the Bahamas International Film Festival
- Jury Prize for Writing at the Nashville Film Festival
- Cultural Discovery Award at the Santa Rosa International Film Festival
- Special Jury Award at the Port Townsend Film Festival
