= The Listening (film) =

2006 film

The Listening (Italian: In ascolto) is a 2006 Italian crime drama film directed by Giacomo Martelli in his debut. The film is based on the mass surveillance operations conducted by the National Security Agency (NSA) with the aid of private corporations, and explores the dire consequences that can arise due to excessive corporate influence on a government agency set up for mass surveillance.

== Plot ==
In the late 1990s, the National Security Agency (NSA) and a computer software firm, Wendell Crenshaw work together to implement a surveillance technology, the Echelon, which enables NSA to monitor almost anybody in the world. When classified information about the Echelon system accidentally finds its way into a young woman's hands, a terrible clash occurs in the opinions of a top-executive at Wendell Crenshaw and an NSA operative, the former determined to find out what the lady knows even if it means using violence and the latter, equally determined to save an innocent woman's life.

== ECHELON ==
Making a film specifically on ECHELON offered the possibility of exploring the issues of interception, violation of privacy, and the interference of corporate interests in matters of national as well as international security simultaneously.

== Cast and crew ==
- Michael Parks : James Wagley
- Maya Sansa : Francesca Savelli
- Andrea Tidona : Gianni Longardo
- James Parks : Anthony Ashe
- Matt Patresi : Guglia Graef
- Bruce McGuire : Phil Kovacs
- Vincent Riotta : Frank Vaughan
- Terence Beesley : John Strobel
- Carla Cassola : Tina Longardo
- Giulia Bernardini : Katherine Palmer
- Marc Fiorini : Lehmann
- Adam O'Neill : Louis Perry

== Awards ==
Taormina International Film Festival 2006

- Best Story - Giacomo Martelli

Viareggio EuropaCinema

- Best Actress - Maya Sansa

== See also ==
- List of films featuring surveillance
