= Sadie Kaye =

Hong Kong TV presenter

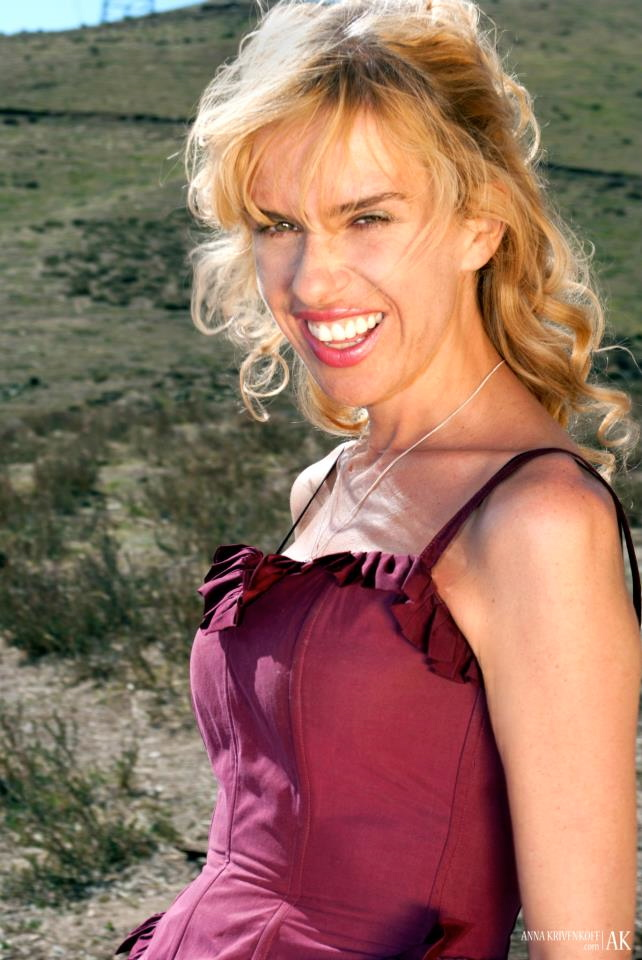
Sadie Kaye (2012)

Sadie Kaye is a Hong Kong television and radio presenter, filmmaker, writer and actress. She is best known as a writer, presenter and podcaster on RTHK Radio 3.

== Career ==
Kaye was raised in Sai Kung, Hong Kong. After attending Murray Edwards College, Cambridge, Kaye started in television presenting children's series Beezwacks on TVB and children's quiz Eat Your Words on ITV.

She created and hosted ETV comedy series Dinner Party and appeared as an actress in sketch shows, including Sack the Writer. She helped judge Channel 4 competition Comedy Circuit and appeared on Channel 4 series The New Entrepreneurs. In 2006 she was a partner in production company Blue Reef.

She produced and presented a series of 3 Minute Wonders for Channel 4 about the 2009 Centre for Social Justice Awards and documentary films Sailing Miss Sadie (2010) and Tucker's Luck (2011) for Sky. In both films she mentors young offenders from The Prince's Trust.

She appeared as an actress in American western film West of Thunder (2012) and British comedy FLIM the Movie (2014). The former won Best Film on Human Rights from the Political Film Society in 2013 and the latter was nominated for a BIFA (Raindance Award) in 2014.

In 2020 she co-produced Transference with the director and producers of Flim. The film received a Special Jury Mention at the 2020 New York Socially Relevant Film Festival. It was released by 1091 Pictures 10 November 2020.

Kaye returned to Hong Kong in 2014. Having piloted the character in a sketch on Funny or Die, she began presenting a variety of comic slots as 'Miss Adventure' on RTHK Radio 3's Afternoon Drive. Since Sept 2020 she has written and performed a humor column 'Sharp Pains' on RTHK's 123 Show.

She has produced and presented two documentaries about mental health for RTHK, Bipolar Express and As Bad As It Gets. Bipolar Express was Highly Commended in the Radio Creative Feature category by the Association for International Broadcasting in 2015. As Bad As It Gets, about OCD, aired in 2019.

Since 2020, she has presented 'Mental Ideas' as a weekly strand of RTHK Radio 3's 123 Show. In the series she interviews a variety of guests about mental health, including cartoonist Larry Feign and actor Philippe Joly. She had previously appeared on the show as a guest. The Mental Ideas Podcast was nominated by the Association for International Broadcasting for a 2020 AIB Award in the Factual Podcast category.

== Publications ==
Her children's book The Wishing Machine was published 31 October 2014. In November 2020 Kaye was awarded a place in the Proverse Poetry Prize's 2021 anthology, Mingled Voices 5. Since November 2020 her RTHK humor column Sharp Pains has been published as a column in the South China Morning Post.

== Charity ==
She set up and runs mental health nonprofit groups Bipolar Hong Kong and Mental Ideas. In 2020 she initiated a project to assist food waste charities feed the homeless during the pandemic.
