= Journey to the Sun =

1999 film

- Film poster
- Directed by: Yeşim Ustaoğlu
- Written by: Yeşim Ustaoğlu
- Produced by: Behrooz Hashemian
- Starring: Nazmi Kırık
- Cinematography: Jacek Petrycki
- Music by: Vlatko Stefanovski
- Release date: 16 February 1999
- Running time: 104 minutes
- Country: Turkey
- Languages: Kurdish; Turkish

Journey to the Sun (Turkish: Güneşe Yolculuk) is a 1999 Turkish drama film written and directed by Yeşim Ustaoğlu. It was entered into the 49th Berlin International Film Festival where it won the Blue Angel Award.

== Cast ==
- Nazmi Kırık as Berzan (as Nazmi Qirix)
- Newroz Baz as Mehmet
- Mizgin Kapazan as Arzu
- Ara Güler as Süleyman Bey
- Lucia Marano as Sexy girl
