= It All Starts Today =

1999 film

- Directed by: Bertrand Tavernier
- Written by: Dominique Sampiero; Bertrand Tavernier; Tiffany Tavernier
- Produced by: Frédéric Bourboulon; Alain Sarde
- Starring: Philippe Torreton
- Cinematography: Alain Choquart
- Edited by: Sophie Brunet
- Music by: Louis Sclavis
- Distributed by: BAC Films
- Release dates: 16 February 1999 (Berlin); 12 March 1999 (France)
- Running time: 117 minutes
- Country: France
- Language: French
- Budget: $6.1 million
- Box office: $6.6 million

It All Starts Today (French: Ça commence aujourd'hui) is a 1999 French drama film directed by Bertrand Tavernier. It was entered into the 49th Berlin International Film Festival where it won an Honourable Mention.

== Plot ==
In a mining town which has been blighted by economic downturns, an elementary school headmaster struggles to obtain social services on behalf of his students.

== Cast ==
- Philippe Torreton as Daniel Lefebvre
- Maria Pitarresi as Valeria
- Nadia Kaci as Samia Damouni
- Véronique Ataly as Mrs. Lienard
- Nathalie Bécue as Cathy
- Emmanuelle Bercot as Mrs. Tievaux
- Françoise Bette as Mrs. Delacourt
- Christine Citti as Mrs. Baudoin
- Christina Crevillén as Sophie
- Sylviane Goudal as Gloria
- Didier Bezace as Inspector
- Betty Teboulle as Mrs. Henry
- Gérard Giroudon as Mayor
