= September Dawn =

2007 film

- Theatrical release poster
- Directed by: Christopher Cain
- Written by: Christopher Cain; Carole Whang Schutter
- Produced by: Christopher Cain; Scott Duthie; Kevin Matossian
- Starring: Jon Voight; Trent Ford; Tamara Hope
- Cinematography: Juan Ruiz Anchía
- Edited by: Jack Hofstra
- Music by: William Ross
- Production company: Voice Pictures
- Distributed by: Slow Hand Releasing; Black Diamond Pictures
- Release date: August 24, 2007
- Running time: 111 minutes
- Countries: Canada; United States
- Language: English
- Budget: $11 million
- Box office: $1 million

September Dawn is a 2007 Canadian-American Western film directed by Christopher Cain, telling a fictional love story against a historical interpretation of the 1857 Mountain Meadows massacre. Written by Cain and Carole Whang Schutter, the film was a critical failure and box office disappointment.

== Plot ==
The fictional love story between Emily Hudson, the daughter of the wagon train's pastor, and Jonathan Samuelson, the son of the local Mormon bishop, plays out against the build-up to the tragedy itself. The film begins with the deposition of Mormon leader Brigham Young. The Baker–Fancher party is then depicted crossing Utah on its way to California. The party encounters a group of Mormon militiamen, who advise them to move on. Bishop Jacob Samuelson defuses the situation but is disturbed to learn that the Fanchers have a woman wearing men's clothing and are delivering racehorses to California to be used in gambling. He is also upset to learn that some are from Missouri, whose inhabitants he blames for the death of Joseph Smith and for persecuting Mormons. He instructs his sons Jonathan and Micah to keep an eye on them.

A scene follows in which the pastor for the Fancher party praises God for their deliverance, while Bishop Samuelson thanks God for delivering the gentiles (non-Mormons) into their hands for divine punishment. As the Mormon leadership prepares to defend Utah from an attack by the federal government, Samuelson's son, Jonathan, develops a relationship with the daughter of the pastor, Emily. At the direction of Brigham Young, local Mormons are directed to massacre the gentiles using their allies, the Paiute Indians. By pointing to a rival Indian tribe as their mutual enemy, John D. Lee, the adopted son of Brigham Young, convinces the Paiutes that it is God's will to kill the migrants. Jonathan objects to the plan, which his father has just conveyed to the local Mormons, and is imprisoned by his father. Jonathan has become disillusioned by the Mormon faith not only because of the planned massacre, but because of what he allowed to happen to his mother. In a flashback earlier in the film, Jonathan remembers that his mother was ordered away by a senior religious leader who took her as his wife; she returned to get her children, for which she was executed in full view of Jonathan and his father.

The Fancher party repels the Indian attack, and the local Mormons are forced to complete the mission themselves. The Mormon militia under the command of John D. Lee is ordered to kill anyone who is old enough to talk. John D. Lee offers to lead the Fancher party to safety; however, they lead them instead to an ambush in which they are all killed. Escaping his imprisonment, Jonathan arrives too late to save them and his lover, Emily, who is killed by his father. John Lee is executed for his role in the massacre in 1877 and Brigham Young denies any knowledge or involvement.

== Cast ==
- Jon Voight as Jacob Samuelson
- Trent Ford as Jonathan Samuelson
- Tamara Hope as Emily Hudson
- Terence Stamp as Brigham Young
- Dean Cain as Joseph Smith
- Jon Gries as John D. Lee
- Taylor Handley as Micah Samuelson
- Lolita Davidovich as Nancy Dunlap
- Shaun Johnston as Captain Fancher
- Huntley Ritter as Robert Humphries

== Production ==
Christopher Cain was prompted to make September Dawn because of his opinion that religious extremism is particularly relevant today. Cain drew on historical records of the massacre, excerpts from speeches by Brigham Young, and the signed confession of John D. Lee, who led the attack. The depiction of the massacre in the film was based on the confession of Lee and staged as he had described it. The film is controversial, representing the view that Brigham Young had a direct role in the massacre, while the LDS Church maintains that "[t]he weight of historical evidence shows that Brigham Young did not authorize the massacre". Officially, the LDS Church "is not commenting about this particular depiction" of the massacre but has published an article marking 150 years since the tragedy occurred.

Screenplay writer Carole Whang Schutter said: "Creating likeable characters that take part in unimaginably atrocious acts is a chilling reminder that terrorists can be anyone who chooses to blindly follow fanatical, charismatic leaders. [...] Our fight is not against certain religions [...but] 'powers of darkness' which are prejudice, hate, ignorance, and fear perpetuated by leaders who history will surely judge by their deeds." Schutter claims that she was inspired by God to write the story. "I got this crazy idea to write a story about a pioneer woman going in a wagon train to the California gold rush, and the train gets attacked by Mormons dressed as Indians [...] The idea wouldn't leave me. I believe it was from God." She also states that she finds the coincidental date of the massacre – September 11 – to be "very odd" and "strange," but that "people can draw their own conclusions" about the date.

== Reception ==
The film has received generally negative reviews and is considered to be controversial. Based on 57 reviews, the film holds a 17% approval rating on review aggregator website Rotten Tomatoes with an average score of 3.48/10; the consensus states: "With its jarring editing, dull love story, and silly dialogue, September Dawn turns a horrific historical event into a banal movie." September Dawn received a rare "zero stars" review from film critic Roger Ebert, who described it as "a strange, confused, unpleasant movie" unworthy of Voight's talents. The New York Post gave the film an unusual 0/4. Justin Chang's review for Variety described it as, "not torture porn; it's massacre porn." Though he realized that the film was meant to draw parallels to the September 11 attacks, Chang remarked that the film does not "convey any insights into the psychology of extremism, aside from some choice moments in Voight's persuasively complex performance" and that it was "ultimately less interested in understanding its Mormon characters than in demonizing them"; the only praise he offered for the film went to the photography and location scouting done for the film.

However, the film did receive some positive notices. Ken Fox of TV Guide gave the film 2.5/4 stars saying the film "sheds some much-needed light on a 150-year-old crime." William Arnold of the Seattle Post-Intelligencer praised Jon Voight's portrayal of Bishop Samuelson stating the character had "a soft brutality that is all the more terrifying for its compassionate veneer." Ted Fry of The Seattle Times stated, "Religious and thematic issues aside, September Dawn is well-crafted as a revisionist Western with a message. If the message is muddled, there's plenty of literature to clear the facts — or to make the matter even more bewildering for those seeking truth."

=== Box office ===
September Dawn opened in wide release on August 24, 2007 and made $601,857 in its opening weekend, ranking number 24 at the domestic box office. By the end of its run two weeks later, it had grossed $1,066,555. Based on an $11 million budget, the film is a box office bomb.

=== Accolades ===
Voight was nominated for a Golden Raspberry Award for Worst Supporting Actor.

== See also ==
- Anti-Mormonism
- Criticism of the Church of Jesus Christ of Latter-day Saints
- Latter Day Saints in popular culture
- Mormonism and violence
- Revisionist Western
