= Beyond Rangoon =

- Theatrical release poster
- Directed by: John Boorman
- Written by: Alex Lasker; Bill Rubenstein
- Produced by: John Boorman; Sean Ryerson; Eric Pleskow; Barry Spikings
- Starring: Patricia Arquette; Frances McDormand; Spalding Gray
- Cinematography: John Seale
- Edited by: Ron Davis
- Music by: Hans Zimmer
- Production company: Castle Rock Entertainment
- Distributed by: Columbia Pictures
- Release dates: June 30, 1995 (United Kingdom); August 25, 1995 (United States)
- Running time: 99 minutes
- Country: United States
- Languages: English; Burmese
- Budget: $23 million
- Box office: $14.7 million

Beyond Rangoon is a 1995 American biographical drama thriller film directed by John Boorman about Laura Bowman (played by Patricia Arquette), an American tourist who vacations in the country of Burma (now known as Myanmar) in 1988, the year in which the 8888 Uprising takes place. Though a work of fiction, it was inspired by real people and real events. The film was mostly filmed in Malaysia.

Bowman joins, albeit initially unintentionally, political rallies with university students protesting for democracy, and travels with the student leader U Aung Ko throughout Burma. There, they see the brutality of the military dictatorship of the Ne Win Regime and attempt to escape to Thailand.

The film was an official selection at the 1995 Cannes Film Festival.

The film may have had an impact beyond movie screens, however. Only weeks into its European run, the Burmese military junta freed Nobel Peace Prize winner Aung San Suu Kyi (depicted in the film) after several years under strict house arrest. The celebrated democracy leader thanked the filmmakers in her first interview with the BBC. Suu Kyi was re-arrested a few years later, but Beyond Rangoon had already helped raise world attention on a previously "invisible" tragedy: the massacres of 1988 and the cruelty of her country's military rulers.

== Plot ==
Andy Bowman persuades her sister Laura, who is a doctor, to go on a trip with her to Burma. Laura, whose husband and son were murdered, is deeply depressed. One night, unable to sleep due to nightmares, Laura leaves her Rangoon hotel and is caught up in an anti-government protest. She is impressed by the bravery of Aung San Suu Kyi.

When her tour group leaves the country, Laura, whose passport was stolen, is unable to leave. While staying behind waiting for her new passport, she meets U Aung Ko, who acts as an unofficial tour guide and drives an ancient Chevy. He takes Laura to a Buddhist monastery. The car develops problems, but fortunately they are able to coast to where Ko's friends and former students are staying. Laura learns that Ko was a college professor banned from teaching because he supported anti-government activities led by his former student Min Han. Laura has a breakdown and tells Ko what happened to her family.

The next morning, they learn that the 8888 Uprising began the previous day. Ko takes Laura to a station to get a train back to Rangoon. She sneaks on board, but the soldiers start beating Ko, and when Min Han intervenes, Han is shot and killed. Laura gets Ko into the car and they leave, pursued by the soldiers, but Ko is shot and wounded. They end up crashing into the Irrawaddy River, but manage to get away from the soldiers. They get on a raft taking bamboo to Rangoon. Laura, who is a doctor, operates on Ko to remove the bullet.

The next day, the raft stops at a village. Laura goes to find drugs to treat Ko. She reluctantly accepts a pistol from one of the crew. At a clinic, Laura finds the drugs she needs, but has to shoot a soldier to keep from being raped. When they arrive in Rangoon, the city is in the throes of a full-scale revolt. When Laura attempts to get into the US embassy, the military tries to arrest her for helping Ko, but the student demonstrators rescue them. After they witness soldiers killing civilians, they are put on a truck heading for the border. Near the border, the group has to abandon their truck and make a run through the jungle. There they meet up with a group of Karen rebels. Laura has a dream where her son Danny tells her she has to let him go. Ko urges Laura to do so, telling her, "All things pass, Laura. They are shadows as we are shadows. Briefly walking the earth, and soon gone."

The next day, Laura and her group of refugees make a harrowing river crossing into Thailand under mortar fire and reach a refugee camp. Having found a new purpose in life, Laura begins helping at the camp's hospital.

== Cast ==
- Patricia Arquette as Laura Bowman
- Frances McDormand as Andy Bowman
- U Aung Ko as U Aung Ko
- Johnny Cheah as Min Han
- Adelle Lutz as Aung San Suu Kyi
- Spalding Gray as Jeremy Watt
- Tiara Jacquelina as San San and Hotel Desk Clerk
- Kuswadinata as Colonel at Hotel
- Victor Slezak as Mr. Scott
- Jit Murad as Sein Htoo
- Ye Myint as Zaw Win
- Cho Cho Myint as Zabai
- M. Rajoli as Karen Father
- Azmi Hassan as Older Karen Boy
- Ahmad Fithi as Younger Karen Boy
- Ismail Din as Myanmar Official
- Hani Mohsin as Young Monk / Soldier
- Zaidi Omar as Checkpoint Official #1
- Roslee Mansor as Checkpoint Soldier #2
- Nyak Osman as Village Headman
- Mr. Os as River Trader
- Ridzuan Hashim as Officer Min
- Ali Fiji as Fuel Vendor

== Reception ==
Critical reaction was mixed. Richard Corliss of Time, Peter Travers of Rolling Stone, and Owen Gleiberman of Entertainment Weekly wrote negative reviews, while the critic for The New Yorker called the film a "fearless masterpiece" and Andrew Sarris declared himself "awestruck" by the film. Roger Ebert awarded the film three stars out of four, praising Arquette's performance and acknowledging the political repression in Burma. Distributed by Columbia Pictures, the film was not a theatrical success in America, which John Boorman partially attributed to interference by the Burmese government as well as Malaysia which was where the film was shot on location. The film was a financial success only in France (where it opened number one and gained 442,793 visitors), though it was screened in many European countries. Film critic Tullio Kezich compared the film to Rossellini's classic, Paisà, regretting that it was marred by certain directorial touches.

Beyond Rangoon holds a 37% rating on Rotten Tomatoes based on 35 reviews, with an average rating of 5.0/10. Audiences polled by CinemaScore gave the film an average grade of "B" on an A+ to F scale.

== Soundtrack ==
Beyond Rangoon

Soundtrack album by Hans Zimmer
- Released: August 15, 1995
- Genres: New-age, ancient
- Length: 38:44
- Labels: Milan Records, RCA Records
- Producers: Hans Zimmer, Jay Rifkin

Beyond Rangoon is an original soundtrack music album that was mostly composed by Hans Zimmer. The album was released in 1999 to mixed reviews. Hans Zimmer highlights on South-East Asia tradition where he employs pipes, wood flutes, and native rhythms with vivid effects to demonstrate the character of the students' strike in 1988, Burma and their fleeing Rangoon after martial law imposed.

Title	Duration
"Waters of Irrawaddy"	3:48
"Memories of the Dead"	1:45
"I Dreamt I Woke up"	8:41
"Freedom from Fear"	1:06
"Brother Morphine"	1:49
"Our Ways Will Part"	7:11
"Village Under Siege"	4:10
"Beyond Rangoon"	10:09

== See also ==
- A Dangerous Life, a 1988 Australian television film about a fictional American in the Philippines who gets involved in the People Power Revolution of 1986
