= Amigo (film) =

2010 American-Philippine film

- Theatrical release poster
- Directed by: John Sayles
- Screenplay by: John Sayles
- Based on: A Moment in the Sun by John Sayles
- Produced by: Maggie Renzi; Mario Ontal; Joel Torre
- Starring: Chris Cooper; Garret Dillahunt; DJ Qualls; Joel Torre; Yul Vazquez; Bembol Roco; Rio Locsin; Ronnie Lazaro; Dane DeHaan
- Cinematography: Lee Briones-Meily
- Edited by: John Sayles
- Music by: Mason Daring
- Production company: Anarchist's Convention Inc.
- Distributed by: Variance Films (North America); Star Cinema and Origin8Media (Philippines)
- Release date: July 14, 2010
- Running time: 128 minutes
- Countries: United States; Philippines
- Languages: English; Tagalog; Spanish; Cantonese; Latin
- Box office: $184,705

Amigo (lit. 'Friend') is a Filipino-American 2010 drama film written and directed by John Sayles. The film takes place in the Philippines in 1900 during the Philippine–American War.

== Plot ==
Amigo centers on Rafael Dacanay, kapitan of the fictional barrio of San Isidro in a rice-growing area of Luzon. His brother Simón, head of the local guerrilla band, has forced the surrender of the Spanish guardia civil outpost and charged Rafael with the task of imprisoning the guardia captain and the barrio's Spanish friar, Padre Hidalgo, in the name of the First Philippine Republic. But when the American troops chasing General Emilio Aguinaldo arrive, the Spanish officer and Padre Hidalgo are freed, and a garrison under the command of Lieutenant Ike Compton is left to "protect" the barrio. The American occupation policy now changes from "hearts and minds" to "concentration" (what was called "hamletting" during the Vietnam War) and Rafael has to answer to both the Americans and the Filipino nationalists, with deadly consequences.

== Cast ==
- Joel Torre as Rafael Dacanay
- Chris Cooper as Col. Hardacre
- Garret Dillahunt as Lt. Compton
- Yul Vazquez as Padre Hidalgo
- James Parks as Sgt. Runnels
- Brian Lee Franklin as Cpl. Lynch
- Dane DeHaan as Pvt. Gil
- DJ Qualls as Pvt. Zeke
- Lucas Neff as Pvt. Shanker
- Bill Tangradi as Pvt. Dutch
- Stephen Monroe Taylor as Pvt. Bates
- Rio Locsin as Corazon Dacanay
- Jemi Paretas as Zuniga
- Bembol Roco as Policarpio
- Ronnie Lazaro as Simon
- Irma Adlawan as Josefa
- Joe Gruta as Hilario
- John Arcilla as Nenong

== Development ==
Cinematical reports that the film was once titled Baryo, and that the idea for it came from a yet-to-be-published novel Some Time in the Sun, detailing American imperialism in the Philippines. The book will actually be called A Moment in the Sun, though the unrealized screenplay which inspired it was called Some Time in the Sun.

The screenplay was written in two weeks and it was filmed over eight months on the island province of Bohol.

Sayles said the "amigo" of the title was the mayor:

The American soldiers were always asked, "Is he a good amigo or a bad amigo?" There was some irony to him being called an amigo. However, the complication in that movie that the usual war movie, you follow the guys on one side and the other side is the enemy. You root for the guys on your side and the other side is shooting at them. This is a movie where it's almost evenly divided. Forty-eight percent is in English, 48 percent is in Tagalog, and there's a little Cantonese and Spanish thrown in. So the audience is asked to do something they're not normally asked in a chronological war movie, which is to spend time with all the combatants and the noncombatants. They, therefore, know more than any one character does. That affects the structure as well, but there is just a structure of events. But how you feel about those events is different because you get to be on both sides and actually care about people on both sides. In a way, what I hope is that by the end of the movie, you're hoping that they won't have a confrontation, but that confrontation is inevitable.

== Release ==
It was screened on September 14 at the 2010 Toronto International Film Festival. Then later at the San Sebastián International Film Festival and the Rio de Janeiro International Film Festival.

Amigo had its New York premiere at the 2011 Asian American International Film Festival on August 10.

In the Philippines, the film was released on July 6, 2011 by Star Cinema and Origin8Media.

The film was released in North America on August 19, 2011 by Variance Films.

== Reception ==
The film was met with generally positive reviews. The film received a score of 60% on Rotten Tomatoes based on 47 reviews. Metacritic, which uses a weighted average, assigned the film a score of 63 out of 100, based on 22 critics, indicating "generally favorable" reviews.

James Rocchi of MSN Movies said the film "feels more passionate and provocative than 99% of everything else out there".

Connie Ogle from the Miami Herald in her review said "A reflection on power and betrayal, on the thin line between acting as your conscience demands and protecting obligations close to your heart."

Peter Travers of Rolling Stone awarded the film three out of four and wrote "John Sayles, a filmmaker by trade, a provocateur by nature, means to stir things up with Amigo. That he does, and more power to him."

Stephen Whitty of the Newark Star-Ledger wrote "By choosing Rafael as its hero, "Amigo" looks not only at a little-known part of American history, but at a rarely examined type of movie character."

David Fear of Time Out New York wrote "Few filmmakers are ambitious enough these days to try addressing our present world-policing endeavors through the prism of past ones, so it almost seems churlish to take Sayles to task for relying on overly dogmatic storytelling."

Mark Neumaier of the New York Daily News wrote "An engrossing, perceptive, supremely humane drama about imperialism and loyalty."

== See also ==
- Heneral Luna
