= List of Vietnam War films =

List of notable films related to the Vietnam War

This article lists notable films related to the Vietnam War.

== Themes and genres ==
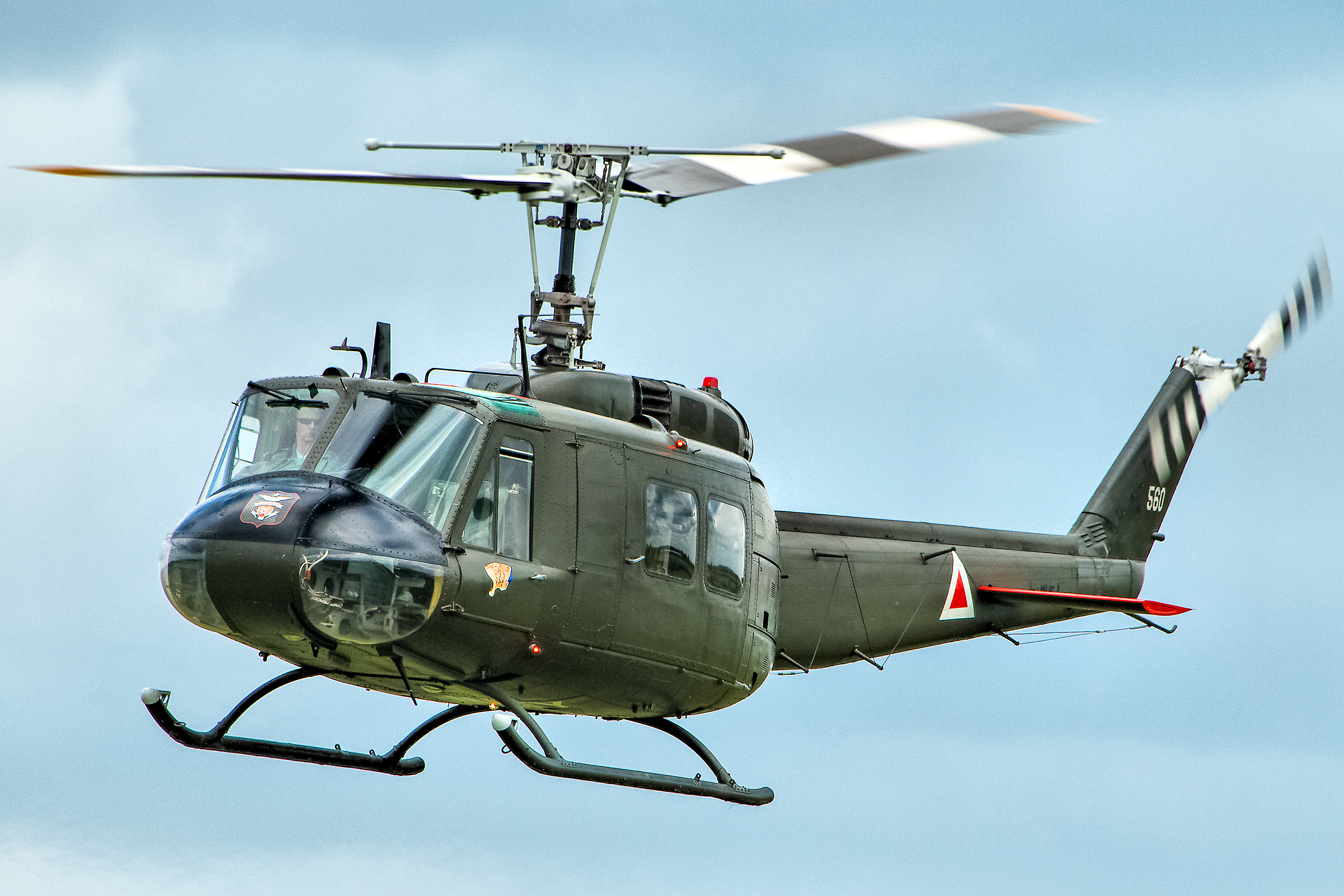
Huey Helicopter often featured in films that are set in the Vietnam War

After the Vietnam War ended in 1975, there was an increase in American films that were more "raw,” containing actual battle footage. A FilmReference.com article noted that American filmmakers "appeared more confident to put Vietnam combat on screen for the first time" during that era. These American post-war film representations have generally been more realistic and gritty, such as The Deer Hunter (1978) and Apocalypse Now (1979).

There were several broad stereotypes about American Vietnam veterans. One stereotype was thinly disguised versions of the real Lieutenant William Calley, notorious as the officer responsible for the My Lai massacre of 1968, the so-called "psycho vets” who were portrayed as bloodthirsty psychopaths who wreak havoc upon their return to the United States. Such portrayals of the "psycho vet,” while acknowledging atrocities in Vietnam, most notably blamed the atrocities upon one deranged individual, suggesting that the atrocities, at least by Americans, were aberrations in the war. Films that portrayed the "psycho vet" archetype mostly took place in the United States and the victims of the "psycho vet" were usually his fellow Americans rather than the Vietnamese. (B-movies that feature Vietnam veterans with an emphasis on action, violence, and revenge, belong into the exploitation subgenre called "vetsploitation.") A more popular stereotype was the "wounded veteran”, a veteran who was always psychologically and sometimes physically traumatized by the war. The character of Nick Chevotarevich in The Deer Hunter, a once promising young man who as a result of his war experiences is reduced to obsessively and hopelessly playing Russian roulette for the amusement of sadistic Vietnamese gamblers in Saigon, despite the manifest dangers to himself, is one of the best known examples of the "wounded vet" stereotype. Chevotarevich was drafted into the Army in 1968 and throughout the film is portrayed as a victim, a man who was just incapable of overcoming the damage done to his soul by the war. Another example of the "wounded vet" archetype was the embittered and paralyzed veteran Luke Martin in the 1978 film Coming Home, whose suffering is redeemed by his winning the love of a good woman, Sally Hyde, the wife of a Marine. The British scholar Eben Muse noted in contrast to Luke, Sally's husband, Bob Hyde, is portrayed as a killer who enjoys the war and commits suicide after the war ends, suggesting veterans "...may either be an innocent or a killer, but not both.”

Another stereotype was that of "the innocent,” which portrayed the war as a sort of ghastly coming-of-age ritual for young American men who, provided that they survived, became real men. An example of the "innocent" stereotype is the character of Chris in the 1986 film Platoon. Chris is a naïve and innocent young man who joins the Army in 1967 out of a sense of patrotism. At the beginning of the film, Chris can barely take care of himself; by the end of the film, Chris is no longer an innocent, and has become a man. Although Chris has lost his innocence, the film suggests that this is a necessary part of growing up to become a man. Another example of the "innocent" stereotype was in the 1987 film Full Metal Jacket, where a young man, J.T. Davis, aka "Joker," joins the Marine Corps in 1966. The first half of the film concerns training at Parris island, where an inept and overweight trainee, Leonard Lawrence, is brutally bullied, humiliated and hazed until he snaps, murders the drill sergeant, and then commits suicide. The second half of the film is set in the Battle of Hue in 1968, where the Marines fight to retake Hue, and the film climaxes with an extended scene where an unseen Viet Cong sniper kills a number of men in the Marine squad Joker is attached to. The film ends with Joker coldly executing the sniper, a badly wounded woman who begs for mercy. Joker in his closing narration notes that he has finally become a Marine and hence a man. Muse noted that both stories in Full Metal Jacket that made up Joker's quest were full of repulsive elements and imagery, but argued the film justifies the brutality of these stories. Lawrence, bearing a "disgusting fatboy” label, "clearly needed some sense beaten into him,” even if the methods employed against him were excessive, while the female Viet Cong sniper had just killed a number of men in Joker's squad and her execution might be seen as a mercy killing as she was unlikely to survive her wounds.

Another stereotype was that of the "warrior" who finds his purpose in the Vietnam war despite all of its dangers and horrors. The films featuring the "warrior" tended to be set in what Muse called the "land of Nam,” a "romance wasteland" portrayed in the films that was different from the real country of Vietnam. Muse wrote: "These movies portray the Land of Nam as a cruel, brutal landscape, littered with mutilated bodies and booby-traps, a place where even the women are rigged with explosives. It is a land in which no limits are placed upon aggression or violence unless by the individual soldier... In the Land of Nam, the soldier can learn to control his base nature, gain the "innocence that changes"; but, he can fail to do so and become another Lieutenant Calley. The Land of Nam is a proving ground for the masculine self." Muse wrote that the films set in the "land of Nam" were not really about the Vietnam war per se, but rather were about struggles to define American masculinity with the Vietnam war just providing an exotic settling for these tests of masculinity." Because the Vietnam war was a lost war for the United States, the war is remembered in America as an especially awful conflict where the sufferings and losses were not redeemed by victory in the end as was the case with World War Two.

In the 1980s, a popular genre of Vietnam-related films was revenge fantasies that featured a Vietnam veteran or veterans returning to Vietnam to vanquish the Vietnamese, of which the most popular was the 1985 film Rambo: First Blood Part II. The American historian John Hellman noted that such revenge fantasies were an American version of the stab-in-the-back myth (that Germany actually won World War I, but was "stabbed in the back" in 1918), minus the anti-Semitism of the original myth. In Rambo, brave soldiers such as the fictional character John Rambo were portrayed as more than capable of winning the war as Rambo is portrayed as killing hundreds of Vietnamese single-handedly and also takes out an entire Soviet Spetsnaz squad, but were "stabbed in the back" by spineless politicians who were incapable of standing up to an alleged leftist-dominated and "anti-American" media. Although Rambo is set in 1985, the film's message is that the Vietnam war was a war that the United States could, should and would have won had it not been for the "stab-in-the-back" by American leftists. Reinforcing the film's pro-war message is the portrayal of the relationship between the Soviet characters and the Vietnamese characters as the latter are portrayed as clearly subordinate to the former, suggesting that Communist Vietnam is a sort of Soviet colony, and the claim made during the war that the North Vietnamese were just Soviet puppets was indeed correct. At one point in the film, a character says that Vietnam is "hell", but that this "hell" is "home" to Rambo. Muse noted that the connection made in the film between masculinity and militarism as Rambo's efficiency as a soldier marks him out as an especially noble example of American masculinity who flourishes in the "hell" that is Vietnam.

The American scholar Gina Marchetti noted a tendency for American films and television when dealing with the Bụi đời children to "annihilate the mothers". Marchetti wrote in nearly all American productions, the Vietnamese mothers of these children are either dead or ended up dying while the exclusive responsibility of raising these children falls upon their American fathers, who were almost always white men. Marchetti wrote that "... these narratives allow their American heroes another opportunity to fight the Vietnam war and win this time, by staking a patriarchal blood claim to Vietnam's children. The absorption of the Amerasian children of war into America argues against any residual charge of American racism, cruelty or heartlessness". Marchetti wrote that the domestic dramas dealing with the war's aftermath often used the story of the "boat people", the mainly ethnic Chinese refugees who fled Vietnam following the 1979 Sino-Vietnamese war, which led to a violent anti-Chinese mood in Vietnam, as a way of proving the justice of the Vietnam war. In Vietnam, like all of the other nations of Southeast Asia, the huaren (ethnic Chinese) made up a disproportionate number of the middle-class people, and were widely disliked for their success in business and the professions. When Vietnam's ancient archenemy China invaded in February 1979, anti-Chinese feelings in Vietnam boiled over, leading to the mass exodus of Vietnam's huaren who fled across the South China Sea in makeshift boats, hence the term "boat people."

The picture presented of the "boat people" in American films was of grateful refugees coming to live the American Dream. Marchetti wrote: "However, these dramas do not deal with the real problems of the Indochinese diaspora...Ironically, these stories do not use the Vietnamese refugee as a central protagonist. Rather, the American "white knight" war veteran, victimized by some unspeakable angst, linked to his involvement in the war, becomes the central hero of the tale." Marchetti wrote that these narratives, by focusing on doomed interracial romances between the American "white knight" and Vietnamese women, served to both justify the war and to present the problems of the war's legacy as being more solvable as these stories almost end with the Bụi đời children coming to America to live a better life.

In the 1985 film The Lady from Yesterday, the protagonist is not the Vietnamese refugee of the film's title, but rather her former American lover, Craig Weston, a Vietnam veteran turned wealthy executive. Craig is married to the daughter of his overbearing boss, Jim, who bullies him and is portrayed as having borderline incestuous feelings for his daughter. In contrast to Craig's controlling wife, Janet, Craig's Vietnamese lover Lien who has arrived in Texas as a boat person refugee together with her son by Craig, is portrayed as the "Lotus Blossom" archetype, namely the submissive, frail, docile and highly eroticized Asian beauty. With Lien's encouragement, Craig becomes the warrior he was once was in Vietnam and he learns to stand up to both wife and his father-in-law. Although the film strongly suggests that Craig might actually be happier with Lien rather than with Janet, in the end, Lien conveniently dies, allowing Craig to go back to his white wife who adopts Craig's son by Lien. Marchetti described The Lady From Yesterday as a modern reworking of Madame Butterfly, where a white man has a passionate romance with a Lotus Blossom character, who dies in order to allow him to marry or stay married to a white woman.

== Theatrical films about the Vietnam War ==
Year	Country	Title	Director	Events depicted
1964	US	A Yank in Viet-Nam	Marshall Thompson	A USMC pilot is shot down, but meets a female guerrilla; filmed in South Vietnam.
1966	US	To the Shores of Hell	Will Zens	A USMC officer leads a rescue attempt of his brother who is held prisoner by the Viet Cong.
1968	US	The Green Berets	John Wayne, Ray Kellogg	A tribute to U.S. Special Forces, starring John Wayne, filmed mostly in Georgia.
1970	US	The Losers	Jack Starrett	An American motorcycle gang is recruited for a mission into Cambodia.
1970	West Germany	o.k.	Michael Verhoeven	Based on the Incident on Hill 192. An American patrol torture and kill a Vietnamese girl.
1971	South Vietnam	Người tình không chân dung	Hoàng Vĩnh Lộc	
1971	South Vietnam	Chân trời tím (phim)	Lê Hoàng Hoa	
1972	South Vietnam	Người cô đơn	Hoàng Thi Thơ	
1972	US	The Visitors	Elia Kazan	A story of a Vietnam War veteran who is confronted by two other members of his platoon.
1972	North Vietnam	Vĩ tuyến 17 ngày và đêm	Hải Ninh	Life of Vietnamese living on both sides of the 17th parallel that splits Vietnam into North and South.
1973	South Vietnam	Chiếc bóng bên đường	Nguyễn Văn Tường	
1974	South Vietnam	Đất khổ	Ha Thuc Can	The Battle of Hue during the Tet Offensive in 1968.
1974	US	There Is No 13	William Sachs	Surrealist cinema based film involving a young Vietnam War soldier reminiscing about twelve love affairs with the cinematography ending before the subject of the thirteenth romance.
1975	North Vietnam	Girl from Hanoi	Hải Ninh	Operation Linebacker II.
1978	Hong Kong, US	The Boys in Company C	Sidney J. Furie	A group of Marines go through basic training and a tour of service in Vietnam in 1968.
1978	US	Go Tell the Spartans	Ted Post	US military advisers during the early part of the war (1964).
1978	US, UK	The Deer Hunter	Michael Cimino	Three friends from Pennsylvania go off to fight, and come back changed men.
1978	USA	Coming Home	Hal Ashby	Jane Fonda who is married to a Marine officer fighting in Vietnam falls in love with a former high school classmate who suffered a paralyzing combat injury in Vietnam. Played by Jon Voight. See IMDb.
1979	Australia	The Odd Angry Shot	Tom Jeffrey	Follows a group of Australian soldiers in Vietnam.
1979	Vietnam	The Abandoned Field: Free Fire Zone (Cánh đồng hoang)	Nguyễn Hồng Sến	An "unnerving and compelling... subjective-camera-eye-view" of life under helicopter fire in the Mekong Delta. The film cuts to an (American) "helicopter-eye view", contrasting painfully with the human tenderness seen earlier.
1979	US	Apocalypse Now	Francis Ford Coppola	A special forces officer is called in to locate and kill a rogue colonel in a retelling of Joseph Conrad's Heart of Darkness.
1980	Italy	The Last Hunter	Antonio Margheriti	Set in 1973, a US officer goes on a dangerous mission behind enemy lines to blow up an enemy propaganda radio station.
1981	UK	How Sleep the Brave	Lyndon James Swift	A group of new soldiers go on a mission in the jungle.
1982	US	Don't Cry, It's Only Thunder	Peter Werner	An Army medic in Saigon takes care of a group of Vietnamese orphans.
1982	Vietnam	Ván bài lật ngửa	Lê Hoàng Hoa	Biopic of the North Vietnamese spy Pham Ngoc Thao.
1982	Vietnam	Con thú tật nguyền	Hồ Quang Minh	
1983	US	Streamers	Robert Altman	Four soldiers awaiting deployment to Vietnam.
1984	US	Birdy	Alan Parker	The friendship between two teenage boys, Birdy (Matthew Modine) and Al (Nicolas Cage), and their traumatic experiences upon serving in the war.
1984	US	Purple Hearts	Sidney J. Furie	Love story between a surgeon (Ken Wahl) and a nurse (Cheryl Ladd) who are serving in the U.S. Navy during the war.
1985	Vietnam, USSR	Coordinates of Death (a.k.a. Target for Death)	Samvel Gasparov, Suan Tian Nguyen	Stranded Soviet sailors witness American war brutality.
1985	US	Missing in Action 2: The Beginning	Lance Hool	U.S. POW breaks out of Vietnamese prison camp.
1986	US	Platoon	Oliver Stone	A new recruit's service in a platoon of soldiers patrolling the Cambodian border.
1987	US, Philippines	Eye of the Eagle	Cirio H. Santiago	U.S. officer hunts down rogue G.I.s.
1987	US	Gardens of Stone	Francis Ford Coppola	Set in 1968–1969, James Caan plays the frustrated sergeant in charge of the Arlington National Cemetery ceremonial guard.
1987	UK, US	Full Metal Jacket	Stanley Kubrick	Battle of Hue; Tet Offensive
1987	US	Hamburger Hill	John Irvin	Battle of Hamburger Hill in the Ashau Valley.
1987	US	Good Morning, Vietnam	Barry Levinson	Loosely based on the experiences of AFRS radio DJ Adrian Cronauer.
1988	US	Off Limits	Christopher Crowe	Two US Criminal Investigation Command agents investigate murders of Vietnamese prostitutes by high-ranking US officers.
1988	US	Platoon Leader	Aaron Norris	An inexperienced officer learns the ropes of fighting in Vietnam.
1988	US	Bat*21	Peter Markle	Lt. Col. Iceal Hambleton's experience of survival while MIA.
1988	US	1969	Ernest Thompson	The film deals with the Vietnam War and the resulting social tensions between those who support and oppose the war in small-town America.
1989	US	The Iron Triangle	Eric Weston	Viet Cong soldier protects captured GI who spared his life.
1989	US, Philippines	The Siege of Firebase Gloria	Brian Trenchard-Smith	Marines defend a firebase during the Tet offensive.
1989	US	84C MoPic	Patrick Sheane Duncan	Found footage-style mockumentary follows a US Long-range reconnaissance patrol.
1989	Philippines, US	Eye of the Eagle 2: Inside the Enemy	Carl Franklin	US soldier goes to rescue Vietnamese girlfriend who has been kidnapped by superior officer.
1989	US	The Expendables	Cirio H. Santiago	Commando trains a group of misfit soldiers for dangerous mission.
1989	US	Casualties of War	Brian De Palma	The incident on Hill 192.
1989	Hong Kong	A Better Tomorrow III: Love & Death in Saigon	Tsui Hark	A crime story involving the struggle of Chinese mobsters and their family trying to get back to Hong Kong during the fall of Saigon.
1989	US	Born on the Fourth of July	Oliver Stone	Based on the experiences of Ron Kovic, who joined the Marines and was wounded and paralyzed in Vietnam. Upon his return to the US, he evolves into a significant activist against the war.
1990	US	Air America	Roger Spottiswoode	Air America pilots uncover U.S. plot to smuggle narcotics.
1990	Hong Kong	Bullet in the Head	John Woo	Hong Kong mobsters travel to Vietnam during the war to smuggle illegal goods. They get entangled with both sides in the war.
1991	US	Flight of the Intruder	John Milius	A-6 Intruder pilots go on an unauthorized mission to bomb targets in North Vietnam.
1991	US	Dogfight	Nancy Savoca	Dogfight shows the last night of several marines in San Francisco, before they are sent to the Vietnam war. Only a short scene of the war itself is shown, where several of the Marines die. Later one marine gets back to San Francisco, where he realises that everything has changed, even the behaviour of the society towards the Marines.
1991	US	For the Boys	Mark Rydell	Bette Midler and James Caan portray two USO artists who entertain the troops and experience turmoil.
1992	South Korea	White Badge	Chung Ji-young	Story of two South Koreans who served in Vietnam.
1993	US, France	Heaven & Earth	Oliver Stone	Based on the experiences of Vietnamese civilian Le Ly Hayslip of the Vietnam war and its aftermath.
1994	US	Forrest Gump	Robert Zemeckis	Title character serves in Vietnam.
1995	US	The Walking Dead	Preston A. Whitmore II	In the waning days of the war, a group of Marines are sent to rescue US POWs.
1995	US	Operation Dumbo Drop	Simon Wincer	Green Berets bribe Vietnamese villagers with an elephant.
1995	US	Dead Presidents	Albert Hughes	Loosely based experiences about the black veterans of Vietnam. Their experiences fighting an immoral war that wasn't their own and coming home to a country still teeming with economic inequality.
1998	Puerto Rico	Héroes de otra patria ("Heroes from Another Country")	Iván Dariel Ortíz	Two Puerto Rican soldiers in action and their family back home.
2000	US, Germany	Tigerland	Joel Schumacher	US recruits go through basic training before going to Vietnam.
2002	US, Germany	We Were Soldiers	Randall Wallace	Battle of Ia Drang.
2003	Vietnam	Hà Nội 12 ngày đêm	Bùi Đình Hạc	Operation Linebacker II.
2003	South Korea	The Classic	Kwak Jae-yong	A romantic movie set in 1968. Joon-ha joins the South Korean Army and goes to Vietnam.
2004	South Korea	R-Point	Kong Su-chang	South Korean unit is sent out to find missing platoon in this horror film.
2005	Vietnam	Liberate Saigon	Long Vân	North Vietnam and Viet Cong's offensive during the fall of Saigon.
2008	South Korea	Sunny	Lee Joon-ik	Wife of South Korean serving in Vietnam takes job as singer to be near her husband.
2008	Canada, US, Germany	Tunnel Rats	Uwe Boll	U.S. "Tunnel rats" who go into Viet Cong tunnel complexes.
2009	Canada, US, Germany	21 and a Wake-Up	Chris McIntyre	The film focuses on real people McIntyre knew in the Marines, as well as experiences of Dr. Marvin Wayne, renowned and decorated physician at the 24th Evac in its final year.
2012	Australia	The Sapphires	Wayne Blair	The Sapphires is about four indigenous Australian women, Gail (role played by Deborah Mailman), Julie (Jessica Mauboy), Kay (Shari Sebbens) and Cynthia (Miranda Tapsell), who are discovered by a talent scout (Chris O'Dowd), and form a music group named The Sapphires, travelling to South Vietnam in 1968 to sing for troops during the war.
2013	Japan	Number Ten Blues	Norio Osada	Saigon in February 1975, during the final stage of the Vietnam War, there is another story of love and violence. Japanese businessman Sugimoto (role played by Yūsuke Kawazu) accidentally kills a Vietnamese man.
2014	South Korea	Ode to My Father	Yoon Je-kyoon	The main character and his best friend serve in the Vietnam War.
2015	US	Ride the Thunder	Fred Koster	The movie takes place during the Easter Offensive in 1972 and the aftermath of the Fall of Saigon in 1975 with the Vietnamese Communist camps. The protagonists are US Captain John Ripley and ARVN Lieutenant Colonel Le Ba Binh.
2019	Australia	Danger Close: The Battle of Long Tan	Kriv Stenders	Battle of Long Tan in August 1966.
2019	US	The Last Full Measure (2019 film)	Todd Robinson	The story follows the efforts of Pentagon staffer Scott Huffman and many veterans to see the Medal of Honor awarded to William H. Pitsenbarger, a United States Air Force Pararescueman, who flew in helicopter rescue missions during the Vietnam War, to aid downed soldiers and pilots.
2020	US	Da 5 Bloods	Spike Lee	Follows four aging Vietnam War veterans who return to the country in search of the remains of their fallen squad leader.
2022	US	The Greatest Beer Run Ever	Peter Farrelly	Marine Corps veteran goes to Vietnam to give his childhood friends a beer.
2025	Australia	Primitive War	Luke Sparke	Set in 1968, follows a recon unit sent into a jungle valley to carry out a rescue mission for a Green Beret platoon, who are soon attacked by dinosaurs.
2025	Vietnam	Tunnel: Sun in the Dark	Bùi Thạc Chuyên	Plot follows Viet Cong units defending Củ Chi tunnels during Operation Cedar Falls (1967).
2025	Vietnam	Red Rain	Đặng Thái Huyền	Second Battle of Quảng Trị, June – September 1972.

== Theatrical films about the Vietnam War POWs ==
Year	Country	Title	Director	Events depicted
1987	US	The Hanoi Hilton	Lionel Chetwynd	Mistreatment of U.S. POWs in the Hỏa Lò Prison.
1987	US	In Love and War	Lionel Chetwynd	Mistreatment of U.S. POWs in the Hỏa Lò Prison.
2006	US	Rescue Dawn	Werner Herzog	Dieter Dengler's experience as a POW.

== Theatrical films about the anti-Vietnam War movement ==
Year	Country	Title	Director	Events depicted
1969	US	Hail, Hero!	David Miller	A young man (Michael Douglas in his screen debut) is torn between joining the army or becoming a hippie.
1979	US	Hair	Miloš Forman	Film adaptation of the 1968 Broadway musical of the same name about a Vietnam war draftee who meets and befriends a tribe of long-haired hippies on his way to the army induction center.
1980	US	Return of the Secaucus 7	John Sayles	Reunion of anti-war protesters.
2007	US	Across the Universe	Julie Taymor	The main character's best friend is drafted to fight in the war.
2020	US	The Trial of the Chicago 7	Aaron Sorkin	Follows the Chicago Seven, a group of anti–Vietnam War protesters charged with the intention of inciting riots at the 1968 Democratic National Convention.

== Theatrical films about Vietnam War veterans ==
Year	Country	Title	Director	Events depicted
1965	US	Motorpsycho	Russ Meyer	A US motorcycle gang is led by a disturbed veteran.
1967	US	The Born Losers	Tom Laughlin	A Vietnam veteran protects a woman who has been assaulted by an outlaw biker gang.
1968	US	Targets	Peter Bogdanovich	A disturbed Vietnam veteran goes on a sniper shooting spree after killing his wife and mother.
1971	US	Billy Jack	Tom Laughlin	A Vietnam veteran defends the hippie-themed Freedom School against corrupt local officials. Sequel to The Born Losers.
1972	US	The Visitors	Elia Kazan	Vietnam veterans confront each other over war crime.
1972	US	Welcome Home Soldier Boys	Richard Compton	Four Vietnam veterans embark on a road trip to California and are killed in a Vietnam War-recreated battle with National Guardsmen.
1973	US	Forced Entry	Shaun Costello	An unnamed and psychotic Vietnam War veteran who returns from the Vietnam War sexually assaults and kills random women who stop at the filling station where he works as a gas station attendant.
1974	Canada	Deathdream	Bob Clark	War veteran returns home as a living corpse.
1974	US	The Trial of Billy Jack	Tom Laughlin	Follows the story of Billy Jack and the Freedom School during and after his prison stint, culminating in a scene reminiscent of the Kent State shootings. Sequel to The Born Losers and Billy Jack.
1976	US	Taxi Driver	Martin Scorsese	A mentally disturbed Vietnam veteran comes to New York City after the war, and gets a job driving taxicabs due to insomnia. He is unable to fit into society, displays obsessive behavior, and is driven to violence.
1976	US	The Zebra Force	Joe Tornatore	The film is about a group of Vietnam War veterans who declare war on Los Angeles drug dealers and the Mafia.
1977	US	Heroes	Jeremy Kagan	Amnesiac Vietnam veteran seeks out former comrades.
1977	US	Rolling Thunder	John Flynn	A returning Vietnam veteran loses his family to a violent home invasion, and decides to seek and retaliate against those responsible.
1977	US	Billy Jack Goes to Washington	Tom Laughlin	In the fourth film of the Billy Jack series, the title character is appointed to the U.S. Senate, where he wages war on corruption.
1978	US	Coming Home	Hal Ashby	Homecoming of a Vietnam veteran.
1978	US	Big Wednesday	John Milius	3 surfer friends face the draft in 1965, one serves in Vietnam and they reunite in the early 1970s.
1980	US	The Exterminator	James Glickenhaus	Vietnam veteran turns vigilante.
1980	US	The Stunt Man	Richard Rush	Vietnam veteran stumbles on a movie set and takes a job as a stunt man to hide out from police.
1982	US	First Blood	Ted Kotcheff	John Rambo, a highly decorated special forces veteran traumatized by his experiences as a prisoner of war, goes on a rampage in a northwestern U.S. town against law enforcement officers who push him too far.
1983	US	Americana	David Carradine	A down on his luck, former Green Beret captain, freshly discharged from the Vietnam War, drifts into Drury, Kansas.
1985	US	Alamo Bay	David Carradine	Alamo Bay is a 1985 drama film about a Vietnam veteran who clashes with Vietnamese immigrants who move to his fictitious Texas bay hometown.
1986	US	Combat Shock	Buddy Giovinazzo	Vietnam veteran goes insane.
1987	Hong Kong	Eastern Condors	Sammo Hung	Lieutenant Colonel Lam is an American army officer given a top-secret mission by the US military. The mission entails entering Vietnam to destroy an old American bunker filled with missiles before the Viet Cong can get to them.
1988	US	Braddock: Missing in Action III	Aaron Norris	Vietnam vet goes back to Vietnam to rescue left behind wife and child.
1988	US	Above the Law	Andrew Davis	The main character was recruited into the CIA by Special Agent Nelson Fox and was involved in covert operations on the Vietnamese-Cambodian border during the Vietnam War.
1989	US	Jacknife	David Jones	Vietnam veterans have trouble adjusting to civilian life.
1989	US	In Country	Norman Jewison	Daughter of deceased Vietnam vet explores her father's past through her uncle, also a vet.
1990	US	Jacob's Ladder	Adrian Lyne	Vietnam vet is haunted by his past.
1991	US	McBain	James Glickenhaus	Vietnam veterans reunite to depose a Colombian dictator.
1992	US	Universal Soldier	Roland Emmerich	The film tells the story of Luc Deveraux, a former U.S. Army soldier who was killed in the Vietnam War in 1969, and returned to life following a secret military project called the "Universal Soldier" program.
1994	US	The War	Jon Avnet	A returned Vietnam Veteran struggles to find work and re-establish himself back home.
1998	US	The Big Lebowski	Joel and Ethan Coen	Supporting character Walter Sobchak is a Vietnam War veteran with PTSD who compares many situations to his experiences in the War
2001	US	Spy Game	Tony Scott	
2007	US	American Gangster	Ridley Scott	The film is fictionally based on the criminal career of Frank Lucas, a gangster from La Grange, North Carolina who smuggled heroin into the United States on American service planes returning from the Vietnam War, before being detained by a task force led by detective Richie Roberts.
2009	US	Watchmen	Zack Snyder	Some characters are Vietnam War veterans.
2009	US	X-Men Origins: Wolverine	Gavin Hood	The main character is a Vietnam War veteran.
2014	South Korea	Obsessed	Kim Dae-woo	Erotic romance film written and directed by Kim Dae-woo, about a couple having a passionate affair in a military camp under tight surveillance in 1969.
2017	US	Last Flag Flying	Richard Linklater	Spiritual sequel to The Last Detail following a group of Vietnam veterans attending the funeral of one of their sons who died in Iraq.
2017	US	Kong: Skull Island	Jordan Vogt-Roberts	An expedition to Skull Island was made by a US recon team, to explore the odd island.
2017	US	The Foreigner	Martin Campbell	Ngoc Minh Quan, a former Chinese Vietnam War US special forces operator turned London restaurateur, who looks for revenge after his daughter is killed in a bombing.

== Theatrical films about Vietnam War MIAs ==
Year	Country	Title	Director	Events depicted
1978	US	Good Guys Wear Black	Ted Post	Former CIA assassin battles duplicitous US government official.
1983	US	Uncommon Valor	Ted Kotcheff	Father organizes a group of Vietnam veterans to go back and rescue his son who is secretly held prisoner in Laos.
1984	US	Missing in Action	Joseph Zito	Vietnam veteran goes back to Vietnam to free secretly held POWs.
1985	US	Rambo: First Blood Part II	George P. Cosmatos	Vietnam veteran goes back to Vietnam to free secretly held POWs.

== Theatrical films about the Indochina refugee crisis ==
Year	Country	Title	Director	Events depicted
1981	Hong Kong	The Story of Woo Viet	Ann Hui	The story centers on the character Woo Viet, who wants to leave his country Vietnam behind and start over in the United States.
1982	Hong Kong	Boat People	Ann Hui	The Fall of Saigon and its aftermath.
1984	UK	The Killing Fields	Roland Joffé	A biographical drama film about the Khmer Rouge regime in Cambodia, which is based on the experiences of two journalists: Cambodian Dith Pran and American Sydney Schanberg.
1985	US	Alamo Bay	Louis Malle	A drama film about a Vietnam veteran who clashes with Vietnamese immigrants who move to his fictitious Texas bay hometown. A despondent Vietnam veteran in danger of losing his livelihood is pushed to the edge when he sees Vietnamese immigrants moving into the fishing industry in a Texas bay town. He teams up with other fishermen and the KKK to terrorize the Vietnamese fishermen in a campaign of violence and intimidation based on true historical events that took place in Texas in the late 1970s and early 1980s.
1992	Australia	Turtle Beach	Stephen Wallace	Judith, an Australian photojournalist (role played by Greta Scacchi), leaves her family to cover the story of Vietnamese boat people in a Malaysian refugee camp. There she befriends Minou, a Vietnamese streetwalker (Joan Chen), who has married a diplomat and together they try to bring awareness to the terrible conditions suffered by the people there.
2001	US	Green Dragon	Timothy Linh Bui	The experiences of Vietnamese refugees in the United States, immediately following the end of the war.
2004	US	The Beautiful Country	Hans Petter Moland	A Vietnamese boy (Damien Nguyen) goes to the US to search for his father, an American ex-soldier.
2005	Vietnam	Sống trong sợ hãi (Living in Fear)	Bùi Thạc Chuyên	A Vietnamese farmer is supporting two families after the end of the war – one in the north, which he abandoned after fleeing during the war, and his new family in the south. To get enough money he sets on to re-cultivate a field full of mines. His life and psyche is changing while he removes each mine by himself.
2007	US	Journey from the Fall	Ham Tran	Vietnamese experience of post-war re-education camps and life as refugees.
2009	Australia	Mother Fish	Khoa Do	Mother Fish, also known as Missing Water, is a feature film written, produced and directed by Khoa Do. The film draws largely from Khoa Do's own experiences as a Vietnamese refugee, and reflects on the perceived fear in the general population generated by 'boat people' which is prevalent in Australian politics and discourse. Mother Fish follows the story of a middle-aged Vietnamese woman (role played by Hyen Nguyen) working in a suburban sweatshop. In the evening when the workers have left, she is transported back to the night she and her sister (Sheena Pham) fled her homeland, led by an uncle promising to reunite them with their father. Through the setting of the sweatshop, the woman remembers the journey. The boat is unprepared for the ocean crossing, as are they. Food and water supplies are low, their engine breaks, and the threat of rape and death at the hands of South-sea pirates is real. Through the woman's memory the audience relives the experience of crossing the ocean in search of a better life.
2014	France, Belgium, Cambodia	The Gate	Régis Wargnier	Based on the books by François Bizot.
2012	Israel, US	Foreign Letters	Ela Thier	The movie involves Ellie, a 12-year-old immigrant girl from Israel, and her family after moving into the United States in 1982. At first, she experiences all kinds of difficulties, but then she meets Thuy, a Vietnamese refugee her age, bringing a changing point as the movie progresses. Its themes include the immigrant experience, learning English, dealing with prejudice, sharing secrets, opening to other cultures, and creatively handling conflict in friendships.
2017	Cambodia, US	First They Killed My Father	Angelina Jolie	A Khmer biographical historical thriller film written by Angelina Jolie and Loung Ung, based on Ung's memoir of the same name. Set in 1975, the film depicts 7-year-old Ung, who is forced to be trained as a child soldier while her siblings are sent to labor camps, during the Communist Khmer Rouge regime.

== Television films about the Vietnam War ==
Year	Country	Title	Director	Events depicted
1967	US	Wings of Fire	David Lowell Rich	Doug Sanborn (role played by Ralph Bellamy) runs a small charter company based at a regional airport. His daughter, Kitty (Suzanne Pleshette), a young pilot who wants to be in the Unlimited class at the air races but her male friends stymie her ambitions. Her former boyfriend Taff Malloy (James Farentino) has recently come back from the US Navy and a stint as a pilot in Vietnam.
1979	US	When Hell Was in Session	Paul Krasny	In 1965, Navy Commander Jeremiah Denton's jet is shot down over North Vietnam and he is captured by the enemy who holds him in various brutal POW camps for more than seven years.
1980	US	A Rumor of War	Richard T. Heffron	Dramatization of Philip Caputo's autobiographical book on his service in Vietnam and his growing disillusionment with the war.
1998	US	A Bright Shining Lie	Terry George	Experiences of U.S. Lt. Col. John Paul Vann, military adviser to the South Vietnamese. Based on the book by the same name by Neil Sheehan.
2002	US	Path to War	John Frankenheimer	The Vietnam War as seen through the eyes of U.S. President Lyndon B. Johnson and his cabinet members.
2005	US	Faith of My Fathers	Peter Markle	Experiences of US Navy Lieutenant Commander John McCain (later senator) as a POW. Based on the memoir of the same name.
2016	US	All the Way	Jay Roach	Biographical drama film based on events of the presidency of Lyndon B. Johnson.

== Television films about Vietnam War veterans ==
Year	Country	Title	Director	Events depicted
1969	US	The Ballad of Andy Crocker	George McCowan	Begins with a Vietnam firefight and then deals with a veteran's readjustment problems.
1979	US	Friendly Fire	David Greene	Based on actual events explores the questionable death of a Vietnam PFC and families quest seeking the truth about shrapnel affliction.
1985	Canada, US	The Park Is Mine	Steven Hilliard Stern	A Vietnam vet takes forceful control of Central Park to remember those who served and died in the Vietnam War.
2001	Canada, US	Under Heavy Fire	Sidney J. Furie	Reunited veterans visit Vietnam 25 years after the war, flashbacks to their battles.
2003	US	Word of Honor	Robert Markowitz	A former army officer is charged with war crimes allegedly committed by his unit in Vietnam.
2006	US, Canada	The Veteran	Sidney J. Furie	Vietnam veteran and state senator returns to Vietnam 30 years after the war, and is secretly probed for information on missing soldier.

== Documentary films ==
Year	Country	Title	Director	Events depicted
1965	Canada	The Mills of the Gods: Viet Nam	Beryl Fox	Various scenes from the war, appearance by Bernard B. Fall.
1967	France	The Anderson Platoon	Pierre Schoendoerffer	Follows a deployed US infantry platoon in Vietnam.
1967	France	Far from Vietnam	Joris Ivens, William Klein, Claude Lelouch, Agnès Varda, Jean-Luc Godard, Chris Marker and Alain Resnais	
1968	US	A Face of War	Eugene S. Jones	Day-to-day activities of active duty Marines.
1969	US	In the Year of the Pig	Emile de Antonio	History of the war.
1970	US	Street Scenes 1970	Martin Scorsese	Follows two demonstrations against the war, interviews with participants and bystanders.
1970	US	The World of Charlie Company	John Laurence	Follows US troops of Charlie Company, 2nd Battalion, 7th Cavalry Regiment, of the 1st Cavalry Division.
1971	US	Vietnam! Vietnam!	Sherman Beck	A United States Information Agency film, narrated by Charlton Heston, was shot on location in Vietnam in October–December 1968, but not released until 1971.
1972	East Germany	Remington Cal. 12	Walter Heynowski, Gerhard Scheumann	Mixing Remington Arms publicity and appropriated scenes of The Green Berets, it explains how American troop modified Remington caliber 12 ammunition into "tiny, flesh-tearing aluminum missiles that cannot be detected by X-rays".
1972	US	Winter Soldier		Follows the Winter Soldier Investigation.
1974	US	Hearts and Minds	Peter Davis	Interviews with Americans and Vietnamese.
1976	East Germany	Der Teufelsinsel	Walter Heynowski, Gerhard Scheumann	Interviews with former prisoner Le Quang Vinh about the South Vietnamese Co Son prison.
1976	East Germany	Eintritt kostenlos	Walter Heynowski, Gerhard Scheumann	A tour of the Vietnam War Museum in Hanoi.
1977	East Germany	Der erste Reis danach	Walter Heynowski, Gerhard Scheumann	Links between former German Nazis and anti-Nazis and the Vietnam war.
1977	East Germany	Die eiserne Festung	Walter Heynowski, Gerhard Scheumann	
1977	East Germany	Ich bereue aufrichtig	Walter Heynowski, Gerhard Scheumann	Through the South Vietnamese commander Lam Van Phat and his North Vietnamese sister, captain Lam Thi Phan, the film reflects on the possibility of re-educating enemies.
1979	East Germany	Am Wassergraben	Walter Heynowski, Gerhard Scheumann	
1979	US	The War at Home	Glenn Silber, Barry Alexander Brown	About the anti-Vietnam war movement in the Madison, Wisconsin area.
1979	UK	Year Zero: The Silent Death of Cambodia	David Munro	The war in Cambodia and its aftermath under the rule of the Khmer Rouge.
1980	Canada	Vietnam: The Ten Thousand Day War (TV miniseries)	Michael Maclear (producer)	History of the conflict from the First Indochina War to the Fall of Saigon.
1982	US	The Uncounted Enemy	George Crile III (producer)	The film alleges that general William Westmoreland presented false numbers of enemy combatants to the US public.
1983	US	Vietnam: A Television History (TV miniseries)		Based on Karnow's book Vietnam: A History.
1987	US	Dear America: Letters Home from Vietnam	Bill Couturié	Based on letters from US soldiers serving in Vietnam.
1989	UK	Four Hours in My Lai (Yorkshire Television documentary)		My Lai Massacre.
1990	US	Berkeley in the Sixties	Mark Kitchell	Anti-war protesters at Berkeley University.
1995	UK	Vietnam: The Last Battle	David Munro	Review of the history of Vietnam of the two decades since the end of the war.
1997	Germany, UK, France	Little Dieter Needs to Fly	Werner Herzog	Documents Dieter Dengler's experience as a POW in North Vietnam, and his escape.
1998	US	Regret to Inform	Barbara Sonneborn	The director, a US war widow, goes to Vietnam to explore the loss of her husband.
1999	Vietnam	The Sound of the Violin in My Lai (Tiếng vỹ cầm ở Mỹ Lai)	Tran Van Thuy	My Lai Massacre
2001	The Netherlands	First Kill	Coco Schrijber	The psychology of war is explored through interviews with Vietnam veterans.
2001	US	Unfinished Symphony: Democracy and Dissent	Bestor Cram, Mike Majoros	Follows a three-day protest against the war in Lexington, Massachusetts over Memorial Day weekend in 1971, staged by newly returned war veterans.
2001	US	Investigation of a Flame	Lynne Sachs	Story of the Catonsville Nine, Catholic activists who burned draft files in 1968 to protest against the war.
2002	US	Daughter from Danang	Gail Dolgin, Vicente Franco	US woman, daughter of US soldier and Vietnamese woman goes to Vietnam to meet her biological relatives.
2003	US	The Fog of War	Errol Morris	Interview with Robert S. McNamara, US Secretary of Defense during the war.
2004	US	In the Shadow of the Blade	Patrick Fries, Cheryl Fries	Huey helicopter on cross-US tour reunites veterans and veterans' relatives.
2004	US	Stolen Honor	Carlton Sherwood	The film connects the testimony of John Kerry with increased mistreatment of US POWs.
2004	US	Going Upriver	George Butler	U.S. Senator John Kerry's military service and his subsequent participation in the anti-war movement.
2005	France	Enemy Image	Mark Daniels	Examines the impact of televised war reporting, starting with the relatively unrestricted reporting during the Vietnam War.
2005	US	Sir! No Sir!	David Zeiger	Anti-war sentiments within the US armed forces.
2006	Australia	The Battle of Long Tan	Damien Lay	During the Battle of Long Tan, 108 young and mostly inexperienced Australian and New Zealand soldiers fight for survival against an overwhelming enemy force of 2,500.
2007	US	The Camden 28	Anthony Giacchino	Follows twenty-eight members of the Catholic Left who were arrested in 1971, for attempting to break into and vandalize a draft board.
2007	US	Bomb Harvest	Kim Mordaunt	Aftermath of the bombing of Laos during the war, the problem of large amounts of Unexploded Ordnance in the country.
2008	US	Between the Lines	Scott Bass, Ty Ponder	The impact of the war on US surfing culture.
2009	UK	Indochine: A People's War in Colour	Stewart Binns	Documentary which tells through their letters, diaries and original color archive footage, the remarkable stories of the people of Indochina who fought three wars over three decades.
2009	US	The Most Dangerous Man in America: Daniel Ellsberg and the Pentagon Papers	Judith Ehrlich, Rick Goldsmith	About Daniel Ellsberg and his leaking of the Pentagon Papers, a secret US government history of the war.
2011	US	Vietnam in HD (TV miniseries)	Sammy Jackson	Better known as the "Vietnam Lost Films" is a six part documentary of thirteen Americans confronting their experience of war in Vietnam.
2012	US	Into Harm's Way	Jordan Kronick	West Point Class of 1967 and their experiences during college and in the Vietnam War.
2014	US	Last Days in Vietnam	Rory Kennedy	About the evacuation of American and South Vietnamese citizens.
2017	US	The Vietnam War	Ken Burns and Lynn Novick	History of the war from the anti-colonial struggle against the French to the exit of the Americans in 1973.
2023	US	The Movement and the "Madman"	Stephen Talbot	Anti-war protests in 1969 cause Nixon to cancel his "madman" strategy for a massive escalation of the war.

== Documentary TV series ==
Year	Country	Title	Director	Events depicted
1968	East Germany	Pilots in Pajamas	Walter Heynowski; Gerhard Scheumann	Interviews with American pilots in the "Hanoi Hilton" North Vietnam prisoner camp.

== See also ==
- Category:Vietnam War films
- List of Vietnam War games
