= Unfinished Symphony (disambiguation) =

Unfinished Symphony may refer to:

- Unfinished symphony, various unfinished musical compositions
- Symphony No. 8 (Schubert), commonly known as Unfinished Symphony
- Unfinished Symphony (film), a film based on the Schubert composition
- Unfinished Symphony: Democracy and Dissent, a 2001 documentary film
- "Unfinished Symphony" (Holby City), a 2007 television episode

== See also ==
- "Unfinished Sympathy", a song by Massive Attack
- "Finished Symphony", a song by Hybrid
