= Thuy Thu Le =

American actress (born 1966/1967)

- Born: August 23, 1966 (age 59); Saigon, South Vietnam
- Occupations: Actress, teacher

Thuy Thu Le (born 23 August 1966) is a Vietnamese-American retired actress known for her appearance in the 1989 movie Casualties of War by Brian De Palma.

== Early life and education ==
Le was born on 23 August 1966 in Saigon, South Vietnam. She fled to the United States with her father and two older brothers during the Fall of Saigon in 1975. Her mother arrived in the US in 1979; however, they weren't reunited until 1985. Le speaks Vietnamese, English, and French. She majored in English at the University of Paris.

== Career ==
Le gave her only acting performance in Brian De Palma's 1989 war drama film Casualties of War. In the film, she played two roles: a Vietnamese peasant girl who was kidnapped, raped, and murdered by a group of American soldiers (her character was based on real-life victim Phan Thi Mao) and an Asian student whom Private First Class Max Eriksson (Michael J. Fox) meets years after the incident aboard a transit line in San Francisco. Le has stated that she auditioned for the part because De Palma's The Untouchables (1987) is one of her favorite films.

== Personal life ==
In 1989, Le had married a Vietnamese-French medical student and was living in Paris with her family. In a Los Angeles Times article she was quoted that acting was a "one-shot deal" for her, as she had no aspirations to become a full-time actress, despite support from De Palma.
