= The Visitors (1972 film) =

1972 film

- Film poster
- Directed by: Elia Kazan
- Written by: Chris Kazan
- Produced by: Chris Kazan; Nicholas T. Proferes
- Starring: Patrick McVey; James Woods
- Cinematography: Nicholas T. Proferes
- Edited by: Nicholas T. Proferes
- Distributed by: United Artists
- Release date: February 2, 1972
- Running time: 88 minutes
- Country: United States
- Language: English
- Budget: $160,000

The Visitors is a 1972 American drama film directed by Elia Kazan and starring James Woods in his film debut. It was entered into the 1972 Cannes Film Festival. Kazan used an article written by Daniel Lang for The New Yorker in 1969, and Lang's subsequent book Casualties of War, as a jumping-off point for this film.

== Plot ==
Bill Schmidt and his long-term girlfriend Martha Wayne and their young son Hal live in a small Connecticut farmhouse owned by Martha's overbearing father. One snowy winter Saturday, two of Bill's ex-army buddies, Mike and Tony, arrive. A few years before, they had all served together in Vietnam in the same platoon but later ended up on opposite sides of a court-martial. Bill has never told his girlfriend what happened in Vietnam or at the court-martial. The story slowly unfolds. Under orders in Vietnam not to take any prisoners, and faced with potentially hostile civilians who might attack them if left behind, Mike kills a civilian after raping her. Bill testifies against him and Mike is sent to the stockade (military prison) for two years. He is angry. There is sexual tension between Mike and Martha. The tension builds and culminates in a fight and a rape.

== Cast ==
- Patrick McVey as Harry Wayne
- Patricia Joyce as Martha Wayne
- James Woods as Bill Schmidt
- Steve Railsback as Mike Nickerson
- Chico Martínez as Tony Rodrigues

== See also ==
- o.k., a 1970 film also depicting the Incident on Hill 192
- Casualties of War, a 1989 film also depicting the Incident on Hill 192
