= Nơi chúng tôi đã sống =

1970 film by Tran Van Thuy

- Directed by: Trần Văn Thủy
- Written by: Trần Văn Thủy
- Produced by: Gerasimov Institute of Cinematography
- Cinematography: Peter Bartol
- Release date: 1975
- Running time: 50 minutes
- Country: Vietnam
- Language: Vietnamese

Nơi chúng tôi đã sống (Russian: Там где мы жили; translate Vietnamese: Ở đó, nơi mà chúng tôi đã sống) is a Vietnamese documentary film. The film premiered in 1970 and won major domestic and international film awards.

== Awards ==
Year	Ceremony	Category	Recipient	Result	Ref
1975	Film Festival Soviet University of Cinema	Documentary film	Nơi chúng tôi đã sống	Hoa cẩm chướng đỏ	
