= The Dance of Death (1967 film) =

1967 film

- DVD Cover
- Directed by: Michael Verhoeven
- Written by: August Strindberg (play); Michael Verhoeven
- Produced by: Senta Berger; Michael Verhoeven
- Starring: Lilli Palmer; Paul Verhoeven; Karl Michael Vogler
- Cinematography: Henning Kristiansen
- Edited by: Monika Pfefferle
- Music by: Joseph Berger; Hermann Thieme
- Production company: Sentana Filmproduktion
- Distributed by: Eckelkamp Verleih
- Release date: 9 November 1967
- Running time: 83 minutes
- Country: West Germany
- Language: German

The Dance of Death (German: Paarungen) is a 1967 West German drama film directed by Michael Verhoeven and starring Lilli Palmer, Paul Verhoeven and Karl Michael Vogler. It is an adaptation of August Strindberg's play of the same title. It was shot in Eastmancolor.

== Plot ==
An egocentric artillery Captain and his venomous wife engage in savage unremitting battles in their isolated island fortress off the coast of Sweden at the turn of the century. Alice, a former actress, sacrificed her career for secluded military life with Edgar. On the occasion of their 25th wedding anniversary, she reveals the veritable hell their marriage has been. Edgar, an aging schizophrenic who refuses to acknowledge his severe illness, struggles to sustain his ferocity and arrogance with an animal disregard for other people. Sensing that Alice, together with her cousin and would-be lover, Kurt, may ally against him, retaliates with vicious force. Alice lures Kurt into the illusion of sharing a passionate assignation and recruits him in a plot to destroy Edgar.

== Cast ==
- Lilli Palmer as Alice
- Paul Verhoeven as Edgar
- Karl Michael Vogler as Kurt
- Ilona Grübel as Judith
- Michael von Harbach as Allan
- Melanie Horeschowsky as Maja
- Dietrich Kerky as Prisoner
- Dieter Klein as Ekmark
- Inken Sommer as Jenny

== Bibliography ==
- Reimer, Robert C. & Reimer, Carol J. The A to Z of German Cinema. Scarecrow Press, 2010.
