= Dr. Stefan Frank – Der Arzt, dem die Frauen vertrauen =

German medical television series

- Genre: Medical drama
- Based on: Dr. Stefan Frank – Der Arzt, dem die Frauen vertrauen by Gerhard B. Wenzel
- Starring: Sigmar Solbach: Hans Caninenberg; Erna Waßmer; Alfons Biber; Daniela Strietzel; Christiane Brammer; Hartmut Becker; Dorothée Reize; Claudia Wenzel
- Theme music composer: Roland Kaiser
- Opening theme: "Alles, was du willst"
- Composers: Chris Walden; Carsten Rocker
- Country of origin: Germany
- Original language: German
- No. of seasons: 7
- No. of episodes: 103

Production
- Running time: 45 minutes
- Production company: Phoenix Film

Original release
- Network: RTL
- Release: 1995 – 2001

Dr. Stefan Frank – Der Arzt, dem die Frauen vertrauen is a German medical television series produced by Phoenix Film for RTL from 1995 to 2001. The show was adapted from a series of pulp magazines, written by Gerhard B. Wenzel.

== Synopsis ==
The series centers on Stefan Frank, a gynecologist, who moves to Munich to care for his ailing father, Eberhard, who has a large house he calls Villa Frank. Other residents of the villa include Stefan's half-sister Laura, his housekeeper Martha, her brother Louis, and Stefan's receptionist, Marie-Luise. The series revolves around Stefan's medical practice as well as various aspects of his personal life.

== Broadcast ==
The initial broadcast of the series was the pilot film Ein Ende kann ein neuer Anfang sein, which aired on 2 March 1995 on RTL. The first season ran until July 1995, and the show was renewed for six more seasons.

== Cast and characters ==
- Sigmar Solbach as Stefan Frank
- Hans Caninenberg as Eberhard Frank
- Erna Waßmer as Martha Brunnacker
- Alfons Biber as Louis Brunnacker
- Daniela Strietzel as Susanne Berger
- Christiane Brammer as Marie-Luise Flanitzer
- Hartmut Becker as Ulrich Waldner
- Dorothée Reize as Ruth Waldner
- Claudia Wenzel as Irene Kadenbach

== See also ==
- List of German television series
