= Hartmut Becker =

German actor (1938–2022)

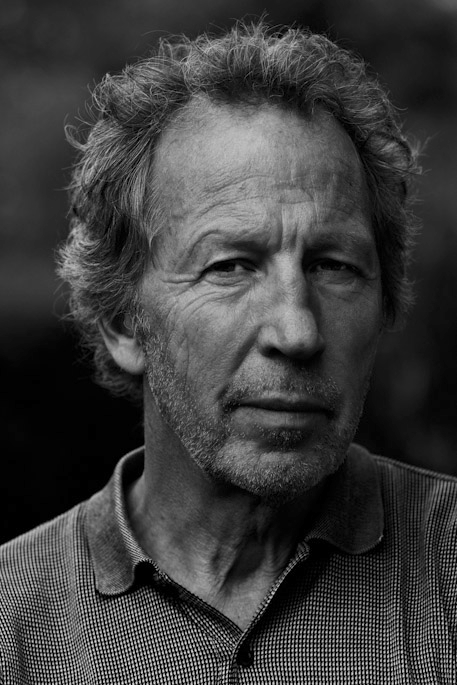
- Born: 6 May 1938; Berlin, Brandenburg, Prussia, Germany
- Died: 22 January 2022 (aged 83); Berlin, Germany
- Years active: 1962–2022

Hartmut Becker (6 May 1938 – 22 January 2022) was a German actor. He played Sgt. Gustav Wagner in Escape From Sobibor in 1987. He also starred in the 1970 film o.k., which was also entered into the 20th Berlin International Film Festival. However, the competition was cancelled and no prizes were awarded, over controversy surrounding the film. After O.K. Hartmut Becker was one of Germany’s busiest actors in film and theatre (at the State Theatres of Munich and Berlin he performed leading characters in plays from Shakespeare to Tennessee Williams). More important main parts in films followed like in Verhoeven's He Who Loves in a Glass House (International Film Festival Berlin 1971), When Mother Went on Strike, John Ralling (TV), MitGift, Audienz (TV), Sunday Children.

== Career ==
Becker was born in Berlin on 6 May 1938. His first leading part in an English-language production, Becker performed in the BBC film Forgive Our Foolish Ways, where he played the role of a German prisoner of war next to Kate Nelligan. The television film became a very big success all over the world. Hartmut's following international film was the American-English production Jenny's War (Columbia Pictures), where he portrayed the main part of Karl Koenig, a character in the crucial test between love and war. His partners in this film were Dyan Cannon, Elke Sommer and Trevor Howard. In his next "Festival-Film" The Tenth One in Hiding (Festival International du Film Cannes 1989) Becker worked together with director Lina Wertmüller. His female partner in this feature film was Dominique Sanda.

Several dream parts followed after the success of The Tenth One in Hiding, for example the characters Niels Jost in A Quiet Conspiracy (Channel 4; director: John Gorrie; also starring Joss Ackland), Rauscher in the American film Triumph of the Spirit (director: Robert M. Young; with Willem Dafoe, Robert Loggia), Lutz in the English-French Television film Free Frenchmen (also starring Derek de Lint, Agnes Soral, directed by Jim Goddard), Moritz in the English-Austrian feature film Gavre Princip by Peter Patzak, King Christian in Young Catherine (American TV; with a.o. Vanessa Redgrave, Julia Ormond, Marthe Keller, Maximilian Schell; director: Michael Anderson), Rusty in the Italian TV-film Requiem per Voce e Pianoforte (RAI DUE), and last but not least Dieter Krause in the English TV-thriller The Waiting Time (ITV 1999; director: Stuart Orme). His last leading roles in German feature films of the last years were The Unforgotten, Montag kommen die Fenster/Windows will drive on Monday (International Filmfestival Berlin), The Gift and Amatores Meae Matris.

Between 2007 and 2012 Becker was a member in the committee of the German Academy of Film (Deutsche Filmakademie). As a songwriter and singer his first single was produced in 2013.

Becker died of cancer in Berlin on 22 January 2022, at the age of 83.

== Selected filmography ==
- Student of the Bedroom (1970), as Schläger auf Fest
- o.k. (1970, International Filmfestival Berlin), as Ralph Clarke
- He Who Loves in a Glass House (1971, International Filmfestival Berlin), as Igor
- When Mother Went on Strike (1974), as Gabriel Gillhoff
- John Ralling (1974, TV Series)
- Derrick (1975, Season 2, Episode 1: "Mitternachtsbus"), as Erich Holler
- MitGift (1976), as Dr. Sand
- 21 Hours at Munich (1976, TV Movie)
- A Bridge Too Far (1977), as German sentry
- Bier und Spiele (1977, TV Series), as Jupp Krüger
- Derrick (1978, Season 5, Episode 5: "Steins Tochter"), as Alexander Bork
- Sunday Children (1980), as Konradi
- Forgive Our Foolish Ways (1980, TV Movie)
- The Living Corpse (1981, TV Movie)
- Jenny's War (1984, TV Movie)
- Mary Ward (1985), as Pater Roger Lee
- Escape from Sobibor (1987, TV Movie), as Hauptscharführer Gustav Wagner
- The Tenth One in Hiding (Portraits with Women / Nine plus One) (1988, Festival International du Film Cannes)
- A Quiet Conspiracy (1988, TV Movie)
- Triumph of the Spirit (1989), as Sturmbannführer Rauscher
- Young Catherine (1990, TV Mini-Series)
- Requiem per Voce e Pianoforte (1991, TV Movie)
- Death of a Schoolboy (1990), as Cpl. Moritz
- Saint Peter's Snow (1991), as Prince Praxatin
- Dr. Stefan Frank – Der Arzt, dem die Frauen vertrauen (1995, TV Series) as Dr. Ulrich Waldner
- SOKO 5113 (1995, Episode: "Der Keltendolch")
- Rosa Roth (1997, Episode: "The Voice")
- The Waiting Time (1999, TV Movie)
- Medicopter 117 (2000, Episode: "Gehertzt")
- A Touch of Love (2003, TV Movie)
- Leipzig Homicide (2004, TV Series)
- The Unforgotten (short film, 2005, Short)
- Montag kommen die Fenster (Windows will come on Monday) - (2005, International Film festival Berlin 2006), as Herr Buchner
- Crazy Partners (TV film, 2006)
- Love and Passion (TV film, 2007)
- The Gift (2008)
- Interim (2009)
- Nightshift - One Murder too much (TV film, 2010)
- The German Friend (2012), as Herr Werner Kunheim
- Amatores Mea (short film, 2012)
- Couples (TV film, 2013)
- Verfehlung (2015), as Kardinal Schoeller
- Die Spezialisten - Miss Mai 1988 (TV film, 2016), as Big Toni
- Liebesfilm (2017), as Lenz Senior
