= Bavarian Film Awards (Honorary Award) =

This is a list of the winners of the Bavarian Film Awards Prize Honorary award.

- 1985 Douglas Sirk
- 1986 Heinz Rühmann
- 1987 Luggi Waldleitner
- 1988 Bernhard Wicki
- 1989 Franz Seitz Jr.
- 1990 Fritz Preßmar
- 1991 Ruth Leuwerik
- 1992 Martin Benrath
- 1993 Vicco von Bülow
- 1994 Erich Kästner
- 1995 Kurt Hoffmann
- 1996 Marianne Hoppe
- 1997 Klaus Doldinger
- 1998 Günter Rohrbach
- 1999 Liselotte Pulver
- 2000 Mario Adorf
- 2001 Hardy Krüger
- 2002 Roman Polanski
- 2003 Sir Peter Ustinov
- 2004 Volker Schlöndorff
- 2005 Maximilian Schell
- 2006 Michael Verhoeven
- 2007 Michael Ballhaus
- 2008 Peter Schamoni
- 2009 Joseph Vilsmaier
- 2010 Hannelore Elsner
- 2011 Wim Wenders
- 2012 Margarethe von Trotta
- 2013 Armin Mueller-Stahl
- 2014 Gernot Roll
- 2015 Molly von Fürstenberg
- 2016 Bruno Ganz
- 2017 Werner Herzog
- 2018 Roland Emmerich
- 2019 Heiner Lauterbach
