= He Who Loves in a Glass House =

1971 film

- DVD cover
- Directed by: Michael Verhoeven
- Written by: Michael Verhoeven
- Produced by: Michael Verhoeven
- Starring: Senta Berger
- Cinematography: Igor Luther
- Edited by: Michael Verhoeven
- Release date: 2 July 1971
- Running time: 85 minutes
- Country: West Germany
- Language: German

He Who Loves in a Glass House (German: Wer im Glashaus liebt... der Graben) is a 1971 West German film directed by Michael Verhoeven. It was entered into the 21st Berlin International Film Festival.

== Cast ==
- Senta Berger
- Marianne Blomquist
- Hartmut Becker
