= Trần Văn Thủy =

Vietnamese film director

People's Artist Trần Văn Thủy
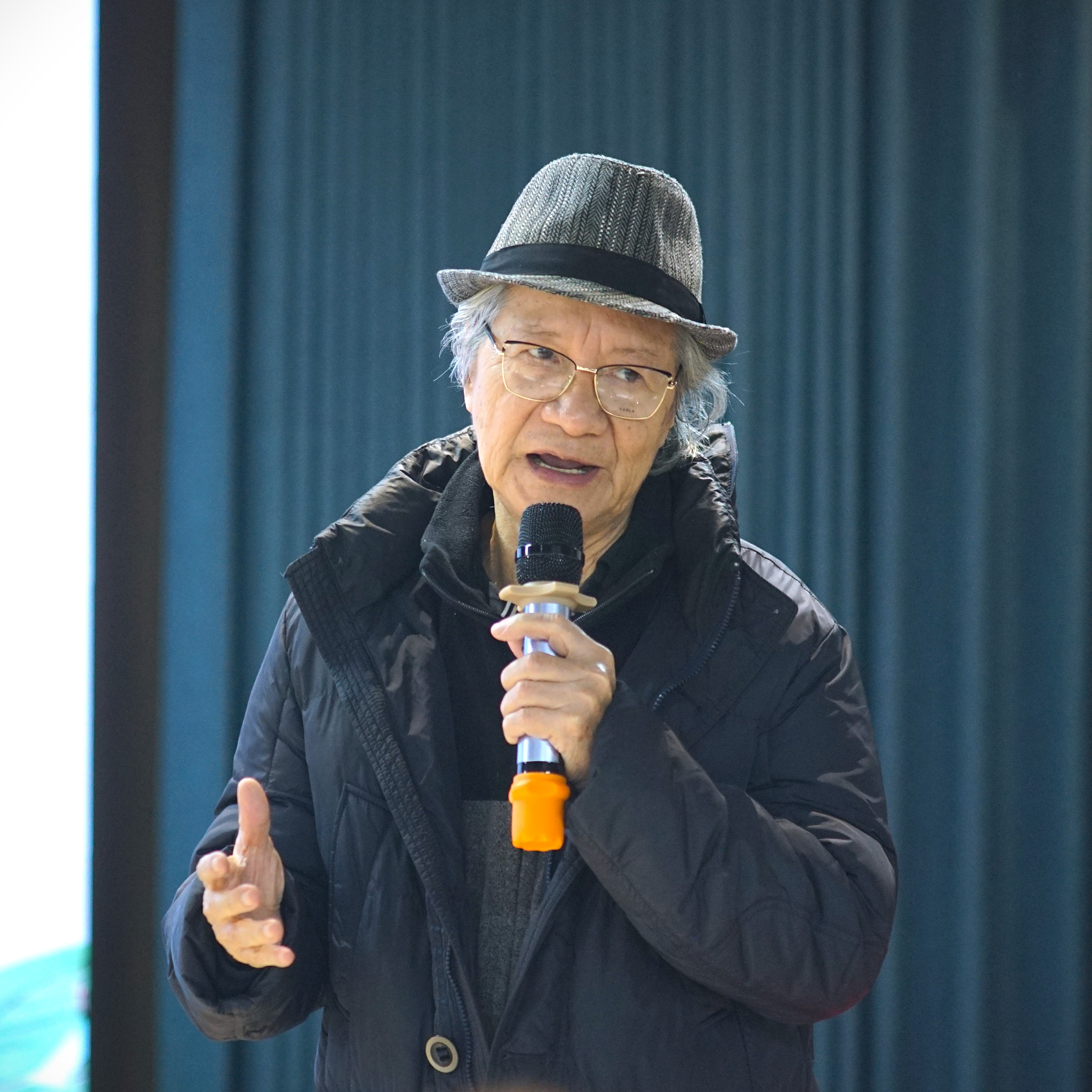
- Trần Văn Thủy in 2024
- Born: Trần Văn Thủy; November 26, 1940 (age 85); Nam Định, French Indochina
- Education: Vietnam Film School (1965–1966); Soviet University of Cinema (1972–1977)
- Occupations: Documentary film director; Reporter; Writer
- Known for: Documentary film
- Notable work: Những người dân quê tôi; Phản bội; Hà Nội trong mắt ai; Chuyện tử tế; Chuyện từ góc công viên; Tiếng vĩ cầm ở Mỹ Lai
- Spouse: Nguyễn Thị Hằng
- Children: Trần Nhật Thăng; Trần Thu Hương
- Parent(s): Trần Văn Vỵ; Đỗ Thị Hiếu
- Awards: Vietnam Film Festival: Outstanding director; 1980; 1988; 1999

Trần Văn Thủy is a Vietnamese documentary film director, reporter, and writer. He has directed more than twenty documentary films on a wide variety of themes. His work has often been a center of controversy in Vietnam; his 1982 film Hanoi In Whose Eyes, and his 1985 film The Story of Kindness, were both banned for a number of years by the Vietnamese government because each had content that was implicitly critical of the regime. Nonetheless, due in large measure to the success of his work at international film festivals, Thủy was able to continue working for the Government Cinema department as a creator of significant films, including A Story From the Corner of the Park (1996), and The Sound of a Violin at Mỹ Lai (1999).

== Early life and education ==
Trần Văn Thủy was born in 1940 in Nam Định, Vietnam. His father was Trần Văn Vỵ (1902–1975), an automotive mechanic and functionary in the French protectorate government who was personally supportive of the revolutionary Việt Minh. According to Тhủy, his father Tràn Văn Vỵ was an extremely humane man who made many efforts to help people in trouble, and Thủy attributes his own strong sense of social responsibility, and his activities as a philanthropist, to the influence of his father. After 1954, his family had a difficult time because Thủy's father had worked for the French. None of Thủy's brothers and sisters were allowed to enter colleges, in spite of achieving high scores in entrance examinations. Тhủy's mother was Đỗ Thị Hiếu (1917–2015). He was the second of seven children. In 1949, his elder brother Vĩnh was killed by French fire in the course of a sweep operation in Hải Hậu, a rural district in Nam Định province where the family had taken refuge.

During his childhood he became an avid swimmer, a skill that later saved his life during his years as a combat photographer. He was educated in French schools until 1954, when he turned fourteen. After high school, Thủy enrolled in a museum course in anthropology organized by the Ministry of Culture, and in 1960 went out to the mountains in the extreme northwest of Vietnam to do ethnographic studies of small groups of minority peoples such as the Tổng lượng and Khu Sung. In 1965, he returned, partly on foot, to Hanoi to study at the Cinema Academy, a subsidiary of the government Cinema Department. His training was supposed to consist of a two-year curriculum concluding in 1967 but, after only one year, he and number of fellow students were recruited to go south as combat journalists and photographers.

== Career ==
Thủy then worked as a war journalist in Military District V (a region around Quảng Đà) from 1966 to 1969, filming scenes of combat while suffering from extreme privation and danger. In 1969, gravely ill and exhausted, he made his way back north, carrying on his back the canisters of film that he had shot in the south. These rolls of film later became his first finished work, "My Land and My People."

In 1972, Thủy went to the USSR to study directing at the Moscow Film College under Roman Karmen (1906–1978), a renowned Soviet documentary filmmaker. After returning to Vietnam from the Soviet Union in 1977, Thủy worked for the Vietnam Central Documentary Film Unit under the Ministry of Culture, and during several sojourns abroad, also worked with Britain's Channel 4 and Japan's NHK.

Since 1992, Thủy has put much effort into charitable work in Hải Hậu, where the local people are for the most part subsistence-level rice farmers. Raising funds through organizations such as "Friends of Trần Văn Thủy," Thủy has provided the wherewithal for the villagers to build roads, bridges, and schools.

Thủy's films have received acclaim, earning him the Golden Dove Prize and the Silver Dove Prize at the Dok Leipzig film festival, and the Silver Lotus Prize and Best Director Prize at the Vietnam Film Festival. He was awarded the Best Documentary Prize at the Asia Pacific Film Festival in 2000 for The Sound of the Violin in Mỹ Lai.

In 2019 Thủy was interviewed by British film director Esther Johnson about his career and philosophy of life. Extracts from the resultant oral histories were included in Johnson's 2022 film Dust & Metal (Cát Bụi & Kim Loại), a documentary feature film funded by the British Council, that looks at Vietnam's love affair with motorcycles. Dust & Metal includes archive material from the Vietnam Film Institute including excerpts from a few of Thuy's films.

== Filmography ==
- Có Hai Tục Ngữ (Làm ở Liên Xô) 1986
- Phiên chợ tình (Love Market) 1992
- Chuyện Từ Một Góc Công Viên (A Story From a Corner of the Park) 1996
- Hải Hậu—Một Vùng Quê Văn Hoá (The Rural Culture of Hải Hậu) 1998
- Huế—Những di tích xưa (Remnants of Former Days in Huế) 1999
- Huế—Lịch sử (History in Huế) 1999
- Huế—Văn Hóa (The Culture of Huế) 1999
- Vọng Khúc Ngàn Năm (Songs Resounding for a Thousand Years; in three parts) 2013

Year manufacture	Movie	Role			Manufacturer	Note	Reference
Year manufacture	Movie	Director	Writer	Film	Manufacturer	Note	Reference
1970	Những người dân quê tôi (My Land and My People)	Yes	Yes	Yes	Giải Phóng film studio area V	first film, shot in the battlefield Quảng Đà; with the contribution of martyr Trần Mậu Tý (pen name Triều Phương), later brought on by Trần Văn Thủy as co-writer of the film	
1975	Nơi chúng tôi đã sống (The Place Where We Lived; Russian: Там Где Мы Жили); 1977	Yes	Yes	No	Soviet University of Cinema	film shot in Siberia, is Tran Van Thuy's second-year assignment. The cameraman was a Czechoslovak named Peter Bartol.	
1980	Phản bội (Betrayal);	Yes	Yes	No	National Documentary and Scientific Film Studio	The film is about the Sino-Vietnamese War; Currently, the movie versions cannot be viewed	
1983	Hà Nội trong mắt ai (Hanoi in Whose Eyes)	Yes	Yes	No	National Documentary and Scientific Film Studio	The film was first released in 1983 but was censored and was re-released in 1987 along with A Kind Story	
1985	Chuyện tử tế (On Being Kind; often referred to as “The Story of Kindness”)	Yes	Yes	No	National Documentary and Scientific Film Studio	Considered volume 2 of Hà Nội trong mắt ai (Hanoi in Whose Eyes)	
1986	Có hai câu tục ngữ	Yes	Yes	No	National Documentary and Scientific Film Studio	The film was made in the Soviet Union, talking about the lives of Vietnamese people living and working here. The film was ordered to be produced by the Ministry of Labor, War Invalids and Social Affairs, but after completion, it encountered controversy among many different ministries and departments regarding content issues, in the end, it was not allowed to be shown	
1990	Thầy mù xem voi (Blind Soothsayers Examining an Elephant; in two parts)	Yes	Yes	No	—N/a (Note: Phim do một số tổ chức Hội người Việt tại các nước Tây Âu cùng bạn bè Trần Văn Thủy tổ chức và tài trợ.)	films made in several Western European countries; Includes 2 volumes, volume 1 is called "Chuyện vặt xứ ngườ" and volume 2 is called "Chuyện đồng bào"	
1992	Chợ tình Khâu Vai	Yes	Yes	No	National Documentary and Scientific Film Studio	Movies that were shown at Yamagata International Documentary Film Festival	
1992	Một cõi tâm linh (A Spiritual Realm)	Yes	Yes	No	Channel 4 Thanh Niên Film Studio	Movies made to order	
1993	The Vietnam Peace	Yes	No	No	ABC Canberra	The movie consists of 3 episodes. Join as a contributor to ABC (Australia)	
1994	Có một làng quê (There Was a Village)	Yes	Yes	No	NHK; Thanh Niên Film Studio	Movies made to order	
1996	Chuyện từ góc công viên	Yes	Yes	No	National Documentary and Scientific Film Studio		
1998	Tiếng vĩ cầm ở Mỹ Lai (The Sound of a Violin at Mỹ Lai)	Yes	Yes	No	National Documentary and Scientific Film Studio	Film produced and broadcast commemorating the 30th anniversary of the My Lai Massacre	
1999	Nam Retour sur image	Yes	No	No	Do Quak Production	participate in the filmmaking process	
2000	Tưởng nhớ Giáo sư Hoàng Minh Giám (Professor Hoàng Minh Giám)	Yes	Yes	No	National Documentary and Scientific Film Studio	biographical film about Hoàng Minh Giám	
2001	Nhà thờ Phát Diệm (The Phát Diệm Cathedral)	Yes	Yes	No	Roman Catholic Diocese of Phát Diệm	Produced to celebrate the 100th anniversary of the founding of the Roman Catholic Diocese of Phát Diệm	
2001	Lời của đá (The Stones Speak)	Yes	Yes	No	Roman Catholic Diocese of Phát Diệm	Produced to celebrate the 100th anniversary of the founding of the Roman Catholic Diocese of Phát Diệm	
2006	Vượt lên chính mình	Yes	Yes	No	Center for Research in Community Health and Development (COHED)		
2007	Mạn đàm về người man di hiện đại (Conversations Concerning a Barbarian of Modern Times; in 4 parts)	Yes	Yes	No	—N/a (Note: Phim tư liệu do gia đình Nguyễn Văn Vĩnh đầu tư sản xuất.)	Movie about journalist Nguyễn Văn Vĩnh, 4 episodes long with a total duration of 215 minutes	
2011	Vọng khúc ngàn năm	Yes	Yes	No	Music Publishing House	film made to order on Millennial Anniversary of Hanoi; co-directed by Nguyễn Sỹ Chung, 4 episodes long, each episode 70–80 minutes	
2015	Alexander Yersin	No	Yes	No	National Documentary and Scientific Film Studio	Director Đào Thanh Tùng and Nguyễn Sỹ Bằng	
2023	Mẹ ngóng con về	No	No	No	Vietnam Television	shown in the program VTV Special. The film was created by him with ideas and themes	

== Filmscripts ==
- Nhà Giáo Nguyễn Lân, 2001
- Alexander Yersin, 2015

== Films with contributions by Trần Văn Thủy ==
- Hoà Bình Cho Việt Nam (participating director; made for ABC Australia) 1991
- Nam, Retour sur image (participating director; made for Quak Productions, France) 1999

== Books ==
- Nếu Đi Hết Biển (If You Go to the Ends of All the Seas); 2003
- Chuyện Nghề Của Thủy (Thủy's Craft; written with Lê Thanh Dũng); 2013. This is a set of professional memoirs.
- In Whose Eyes: The Memoir of a Vietnamese Filmmaker in War and Peace (a considerably rearranged English version of Chuyện Nghề Của Thủy, above); University of Massachusetts Press, 2016; ISBN 978-1-62534-252-2
- Trong Đống Tro Tàn (Amid the Heap of Dusty Ashes); 2016
- Wayne Karlin, War Movies: Journeys to Vietnam, Curbstone Press, 2005; ISBN 1-931896-16-X
