= The Tenth One in Hiding =

1989 film

- Directed by: Lina Wertmüller
- Written by: Giovannino Guareschi; Lina Wertmüller
- Produced by: Carlo Vanzina; Enrico Vanzina
- Starring: Piera Degli Esposti; Dominique Sanda; Hartmut Becker; Susanna Marcomeni; Giorgio Trestini
- Cinematography: Carlo Tafani
- Edited by: Pierluigi Leonardi
- Release date: 12 May 1989
- Running time: 86 minutes
- Country: Italy
- Language: Italian

The Tenth One in Hiding (Italian: Il decimo clandestino) is a 1989 Italian drama film directed by Lina Wertmüller. It is based on the short story with the same name by Giovannino Guareschi. It was screened in the Un Certain Regard section at the 1989 Cannes Film Festival.

== Cast ==
- Piera Degli Esposti - Marcella
- Dominique Sanda - Landlady
- Hartmut Becker - Landlord
- Susanna Marcomeni - Cesira
- Giorgio Trestini - Tognone
