= Những người dân quê tôi =

1970 film by Tran Van Thuy

- Directed by: Tran Van Thuy
- Written by: Trần Văn Thủy
- Produced by: Giải Phóng Film Studio, Region V
- Release date: 1970
- Running time: 50 minutes
- Country: Vietnam
- Language: Vietnamese

My Land and My People (Vietnamese: Những người dân quê tôi) is a Vietnamese documentary film. The film premiered in 1970 and won major domestic and international film awards.

== Awards ==
Year	Ceremony	Category	Recipient	Result	Ref
1970	Nguyễn Đình Chiểu Prize	Documentary	Những người dân quê tôi	Won	
1970	DOK Leipzig	Documentary	Những người dân quê tôi	Silver Dove	
1973	Vietnam Film Festival 2nd time	Documentary film (celebrating 20 years of Vietnamese revolutionary cinema)	Những người dân quê tôi	Silver lotus	
