= The Sound of the Violin in My Lai =

1998 film by Tran Van Thuy

- Directed by: Tran Van Thuy
- Produced by: Mike Boehm, My Lai Peace Park Project
- Release date: 1998
- Running time: 32 minutes
- Country: Vietnam
- Language: Vietnamese

The Sound of the Violin in My Lai (Vietnamese: Tiếng vĩ cầm ở Mỹ Lai) is a short film that examines the history and legacy of the My Lai massacre, an incident of the Vietnam War in which hundreds of Vietnamese civilians were massacred by U.S. Army soldiers. The film investigates the effects of the massacre, with the story centering on the return of American soldiers Hugh Thompson and Larry Colburn to My Lai on the 30th anniversary of the event.

The film was commissioned by the Vietnamese government. It garnered director Tran Van Thuy the Best Documentary Prize at the Asia Pacific Film Festival in year 2000.

The violin referenced in the title is that of American Vietnam veteran and peace activist Roy Boehm.

== Plot ==
The film is about the massacre that occurred in Sơn Mỹ on the morning of March 16, 1968, when the US army killed 504 civilians within 4 hours. Despite its dark theme, the film conveys a message of hope and redemption - and the message of forgetting the past and looking towards the future. The main violinist is a US Air Force veteran, Mike Boehm.

Boehm returned to Vietnam in an attempt to atone for atrocities committed by the US military against the people of Sơn Mỹ. One of Boehm's pursuits is playing the violin - both for living people and for the souls of the dead.

The film was shown on Vietnamese television on the 30th anniversary of the massacre. On the same day, US Ambassador Pete Peterson and former President Bill Clinton apologized to the Vietnamese people for this massacre.

== Awards ==
Year	Ceremony	Category	Recipient	Result	Ref
1999	Asia-Pacific Film Festival 43rd time	Best short film	Tiếng vĩ cầm ở Mỹ Lai	Golden crane	
1999	12th Vietnam Film Festival	Documentary	Tiếng vĩ cầm ở Mỹ Lai	Silver lotus	
1999	12th Vietnam Film Festival	Best Director Award	Trần Văn Thủy	Won	
1999	Vietnam Cinema Association Awards	Documentary	Tiếng vĩ cầm ở Mỹ Lai	Giải A	

== Sources ==
- Ngô Văn Phương (2005). Vì một nước Việt Nam phát triển [For a developed Vietnam] (in Vietnamese). Hồ Chí Minh City: Nhà xuất bản Tổng hợp Thành phố Hồ Chí Minh. OCLC 61768089. Archived from the original on 2022-02-19.
- Nguyễn Thị Hồng Ngát (2005). Lịch sử điện ảnh Việt Nam, Tập 2 [History of Vietnamese cinema, Volume 2] (in Vietnamese). Hà Nội: Cục Điện ảnh Việt Nam. OCLC 53129383.
- Thế Thái (1999). "Liên hoan phim Việt Nam lần thứ 12" [The 12th Vietnam Film Festival]. Văn hóa Nghệ thuật (Culture and arts) (in Vietnamese) (1–6). ISSN 0866-8655. Archived from the original on 2023-05-18.
