= Casualties of War =

1989 American war drama film

- Theatrical release poster
- Directed by: Brian De Palma
- Screenplay by: David Rabe
- Based on: Casualties of War by Daniel Lang
- Produced by: Art Linson
- Starring: Michael J. Fox; Sean Penn
- Cinematography: Stephen H. Burum
- Edited by: Bill Pankow
- Music by: Ennio Morricone
- Distributed by: Columbia Pictures
- Release date: August 18, 1989
- Running time: 113 minutes
- Country: United States
- Language: English
- Budget: $22.5 million
- Box office: $18.7 million

Casualties of War is a 1989 American war drama film directed by Brian De Palma and written by David Rabe, based primarily on an article written by Daniel Lang for The New Yorker in 1969, which was later published as a book. The film stars Michael J. Fox and Sean Penn and is based on the events of the 1966 incident on Hill 192 during the Vietnam War, in which Pan Thi Mao, a Vietnamese woman, was kidnapped from her village, raped and murdered by a squad of American soldiers. All names and some details of the true story were altered for the film.

Casualties of War was released by Columbia Pictures on August 18, 1989. The film received positive reviews from critics but underperformed at the box office, grossing $18.7 million against a $22.5 million budget.

== Plot ==
The story is presented as a flashback of Max Eriksson, a Vietnam veteran. A platoon of American soldiers led by Lieutenant Reilly is ambushed by Viet Cong (VC) after a panicked soldier exposes their position during a night patrol. Eriksson falls into a VC tunnel entrance, and Eriksson's squad leader, Sergeant Tony Meserve, pulls him from the hole as the platoon breaks contact.

While resting by a river village in the Central Highlands, the platoon is again ambushed by VC. One of Meserve's friends, Specialist 4 "Brownie" Brown, is killed, leaving Meserve deeply affected. The platoon is ordered to return to their base. Frustrated because his squad has been denied leave for an extended period, Meserve orders the squad to kidnap a Vietnamese girl to take with them on their next mission, an extended reconnaissance patrol. Eriksson's objections are ignored, and he voices his concerns to his closest friend, Rowan, before Meserve leads him out of camp, along with Corporal Thomas E. Clark, Private First Class Herbert Hatcher, and Private First Class Antonio Dìaz, a replacement radio operator. The squad enters a village after nightfall and kidnap a Vietnamese girl, Tran Thi Oanh.

The squad treks into the mountains seeking privacy for their planned sexual assault, and Dìaz begins to reconsider his part in kidnapping Tran and begs Eriksson to stand up to Meserve with him. The group enters an abandoned hooch, and when Eriksson is threatened by Meserve, Clark and Hatcher, Dìaz gives in to peer pressure and leaves Eriksson isolated in his opposition. Meserve forces Eriksson to stand guard while the men take turns raping Tran.

At daybreak, Eriksson is ordered to guard Tran while the rest of the squad takes up a position near a railroad bridge overlooking a Viet Cong river supply depot. Eriksson has earned Tran's trust and prepares to desert in order to return Tran to her family, but he is ordered to take Tran to the bridge before he can carry out his plan. Meserve requests close air support for an assault on the depot and orders Dìaz to kill Tran with a knife. To prevent the murder, Eriksson fires his rifle into the air, alerting the nearby Viet Cong. Tran, repeatedly stabbed by Clark, tries to escape during the ensuing firefight. Meserve subdues Eriksson with his rifle butt and the squad shoots Tran numerous times, knocking her off the bridge to her death.

Eriksson wakes up in a field hospital and tells Rowan everything that happened. He suggests reporting to Reilly and company commander Captain Hill, but they prefer to bury the matter. When Eriksson presses the issue, Hill decides to transfer him to a tunnel rat unit and reassign the men in Meserve's squad. After narrowly escaping an attempt by Clark to kill him in the latrine with a grenade, Eriksson assaults him with a shovel. Eriksson tells Meserve that killing him is unnecessary because no one cares about the crime. Shaken, Meserve dismisses Eriksson as crazy.

The incident is finally investigated after Eriksson discusses it with an Army chaplain. The four men who participated in the rape and murder are court-martialed and convicted. Meserve receives ten years' imprisonment at hard labor and a dishonorable discharge, Clark receives life in prison, and Hatcher and Diaz receive fifteen and eight years of hard labor, respectively.

Eriksson awakens from a nightmare to find himself on a transit line in San Francisco, just a few seats from a Vietnamese-American student who resembles Tran. She disembarks at Dolores Park and forgets her scarf, prompting Eriksson to run after her to return it. As she thanks him and turns away, he calls after her in Vietnamese. She surmises that she reminds him of someone and that he has had a bad dream, but assures him that "it's over now."

== Cast ==
The film continued the pseudonyms Lang used in his article, even though the soldiers' real names had since become public.

- Michael J. Fox as Private First Class Max Eriksson (based on Robert M. Storeby)
- Sean Penn as Sergeant Tony Meserve (based on David Edward Gervase)
- Don Patrick Harvey as Corporal Thomas E. Clark
- John C. Reilly as Private First Class Herbert Hatcher
- John Leguizamo as Private First Class Antonio Dìaz
- Thuy Thu Le as Tran Thi Oanh (based on real-life victim Phan Thi Mao) / Asian Student on the Train
- Erik King as Specialist 4 "Brownie" Brown
- Jack Gwaltney as Rowan
- Ving Rhames as Lieutenant Reilly
- Dale Dye as Captain Hill
- Holt McCallany as Lieutenant Kramer
- Dan Martin as Sergeant Hawthorne
- Wendell Pierce as MacIntire
- Sam Robards as Chaplain Captain Kirk
- Steve Larson as Agent #1
- John Linton as Agent #2
- Vyto Ruginis as Prosecutor
- Maris Valainis as Streibig
- Darren E. Burrows as "Cherry"
- Sherman Howard as Court Martial President
- John Marshall Jones as Military Policeman
- Gregg Henry as Attorney (uncredited)
- Stephen Baldwin as Soldier (uncredited)
- Amy Irving as Voice of Girl on the Train (uncredited)

== Production ==
=== Development ===
The film was based on the real-life incident on Hill 192, and on Daniel Lang's lengthy New Yorker article, "Casualties of War," published in October 1969 and released as a book, with the same title, a month later. Film rights were bought by David Susskind who was to produce the film for Warner Bros. Pete Hamill wrote a script and Jack Clayton was to direct. However, the film was not made.

The first film to be made from the story was o.k. (1970), directed by German filmmaker Michael Verhoeven. o.k. was entered to the Berlin Film Festival in 1970, causing so much controversy among the judges that the festival was shut down for that year with no awards given. De Palma was at that festival with his film Dionysus in '69.

The second film to be made from the story was The Visitors (1972), directed by Elia Kazan; it was a fictionalized interpretation of what might happen if Erikkson and his wife were terrorized by his former squad colleagues after they were released. The film showed in competition at the 1972 Cannes Film Festival.

In the late 1970s, Susskind announced he would make Casualties of War for ABC. This did not happen.

In the 1980s, Brian De Palma and David Rabe discussed making Casualties of War into a film together. The project received interest from studio executive Dawn Steel at Paramount Pictures, but then it was canceled when studio head Ned Tanen, repulsed by the subject matter, put it in "turnaround". Shortly after that, Steel was fired from Paramount while going into labor giving birth to her daughter.

After De Palma experienced commercial success with The Untouchables, Steel became head of production at Columbia Pictures, Casualties of War was the first film she green-lit, and the project automatically secured financing once Michael J. Fox was cast.

"Historically Vietnam War movies have been very profitable," said Steel. "All of them. Platoon, Full Metal Jacket, Apocalypse Now, The Deer Hunter. You're looking at movies that have never been not [just] pretty successful, but very successful. The foreign numbers have been extraordinary."

De Palma, Rabe and producer Art Linson had briefly considered filming a climactic nightmare sequence where Eriksson is haunted by Meserve exacting revenge against him. Rabe has commented that he was nervous about writing the scene, concerned that the film was already dark enough, and that he was relieved when the scene ultimately wasn't filmed.

However, Rabe's biggest disagreement with De Palma and Linson arose over the film's final scene, where Eriksson meets a girl on the train who resembles the murdered girl. For the ending, Rabe simply wanted Eriksson to help the girl on the train carry her groceries, but De Palma insisted instead on ending the film with the girl telling Eriksson that his "bad dream" has concluded.

=== Filming ===
The film was shot in April–May 1988, mostly on location in Thailand, with some filming in San Francisco. The bridge location was filmed in Kanchanaburi, Thailand, the same as for Bridge on the River Kwai. This film was Fox's third major dramatic role. He had previously starred in Light of Day and Bright Lights, Big City. John Leguizamo, who appeared in his first major film role, would later star with Penn in 1993's Carlito's Way, another De Palma vehicle.

Stephen Baldwin was originally cast as Herbert Hatcher, but was fired after only a few days of filming. He still appears in some scenes, his role reduced to that of an unnamed character. Baldwin later theorized that his firing was due to him clashing with De Palma after questioning Penn's use of a New York accent. Baldwin was replaced by John C. Reilly, who was already on location as an extra. This film marked Reilly's screen debut; he worked with Penn again in We're No Angels, State of Grace and The Thin Red Line.

"Let's be honest," said Fox at the time. "If this movie makes a buck and a half it's going to be things like Bikini's Away for me. But to fail doing something unexpected is no disgrace. To fail doing the ordinary is a disaster. This movie is about how much you will risk if you have nothing to gain."

== Release and reception ==
=== Box office ===
Casualties of War opened in 1,487 theaters, and ranked number 4 in box office for the first week of its release. It went on to gross $18.7 million.

=== Critical response ===
The film holds an 82% rating on Rotten Tomatoes based on 50 reviews. The site's consensus states: "Casualties of War takes a harrowing plunge into the Vietnam War with a well-acted ensemble piece that ranks among director Brian De Palma's more mature efforts." Metacritic, which uses a weighted average, assigned the film a score of 75 out of 100, based on 24 critics, indicating "generally favorable" reviews. Audiences polled by CinemaScore gave the film an average grade of "B+" on an A+ to F scale.

Roger Ebert gave the film three stars out of four and wrote, "More than most films, it depends on the strength of its performances for its effect—and especially on Penn's performance. If he is not able to convince us of his power, his rage and his contempt for the life of the girl, the movie would not work. He does, in a performance of overwhelming, brutal power." Vincent Canby of The New York Times stated, "Casualties of War moves toward its climax so inevitably and surely that the courts-martial, which are the film's penultimate sequence, are no less riveting for the theatrical way in which they have been compressed." He also called Penn's performance "extremely fine" and wrote of Fox that he "remains firmly in character" in a "difficult" role. Todd McCarthy of Variety wrote, "A powerful metaphor of the national shame that was America's orgy of destruction in Vietnam, Brian DePalma's film is flawed by some punch-pulling but is sure to rouse strong audience interest, even if the Columbia release will be a bitter pill for many." Gene Siskel of the Chicago Tribune gave the film three stars out of four and called it "a major effort in a minor key because of the limitations of the simple story." Michael Wilmington of the Los Angeles Times wrote, "Casualties of War is DePalma's 19th movie and easily his best. His detractors saw his Hitchcock-pastiche thrillers as manipulative and sadistic, but here he's not dealing with stylish slashers or bloody set-pieces. He doesn't have to reach for a shock. He's dredging up a deeper horror: the hell that lies beneath every man's skin, waiting to erupt." Hal Hinson of The Washington Post praised it as "a film of great emotional power" and "one of the most punishing, morally complex movies about men at war ever made."

De Palma invited Steven Spielberg to a private screening of the film, and after the screening ended, Spielberg said to Columbia Pictures executive Dawn Steel, "You'll be thinking about this for a week." The film was criticized by Vietnam veterans' groups. Quentin Tarantino has hailed the film as "the greatest film about the Vietnam War."

At the time of the film's release, David Rabe disassociated himself from it, saying that De Palma had not been faithful to his script. However, in recent years, Rabe has changed his mind on the film, praising the performances of Fox and Penn, while stating his appreciation for "the near-heroism" that it took for De Palma and Dawn Steel to get the film green-lit. Rabe now says that Casualties of War "is a great film. I was rocked to my core seeing it again this time, and am very proud of it. What I hoped would be conveyed is there. It comes through powerfully, and there are many striking sequences of gorgeous direction and filmmaking—almost too many to count."

=== Home media ===
The theatrical cut of the film was released on DVD in 2001. This version has the original 113-minute running time. An extended cut of the film was released on DVD in 2006, that contains two scenes cut from the original release. One has Max Eriksson (Fox) being interrogated by the two investigators (Greg Larson and John Linton), and the other is a defense attorney (played by uncredited Gregg Henry) trying to discredit Eriksson during the trial. This extended version has a running time of 119 minutes.

=== Awards ===
Wins

- Political Film Society Award for Peace; 1990

Nominations

- Golden Globes: Golden Globe Award for Best Original Score – Ennio Morricone; 1990
- Motion Picture Sound Editors: Golden Reel Award for Best Sound Editing – Sound Effects – Maurice Schell; 1990

== See also ==
- o.k., a 1970 film also depicting the Incident on Hill 192
- The Visitors, a 1972 film also depicting the Incident on Hill 192
- Redacted, a 2007 film also directed by Brian De Palma depicting similar war crimes carried out by U.S. soldiers in Iraq
