= The Dance of Death (Strindberg play) =

1900 play by August Strindberg

The Dance of Death (Swedish: Dödsdansen) refers to two plays, The Dance of Death I, and The Dance of Death II, both written by August Strindberg in 1900. Part one was written in September, and then, after receiving a response to the play, part two was written in November. The two plays have much in common, and each is a full evening in the theatre. If they are joined together as one theatre-going experience, a couple of unexplained discrepancies between the two plays present difficulties. For example, in part one the Captain is desperately poor, and in part two he is well-to-do.

== Dance of Death I ==
Dance of Death I is written in a spirit of the "blackest pessimism". In performance it can reveal a surprising streak of black humor, and it can leave the audience with an astonishing and powerful impression. The story is about a man and wife who hate each other, who are brutally and ferociously vicious towards each other, who are trapped in a miserable marriage. And soon they'll be celebrating their 25th wedding anniversary. The husband, Edgar, is an artillery captain and a tyrant of a man. His wife, Alice, is a former actress. They live somewhat isolated on an island, and are not popular or social. Their children do not live with them; each parent has turned the children against the other parent. Edgar is having heart problems and may not have long to live. Alice sometimes plays the piano as her husband dances a kind of bizarre saber dance. As he dances, she hopes it might kill him, and he threatens to cut her out of his will.

The third important character is Kurt, who is Alice's cousin. He visits and learns that in the past the captain worked with Kurt's former wife in a way that caused Kurt to lose custody of his own children in his divorce. Kurt and Alice join forces to plot against her husband, and the cousins' relationship becomes passionate and sexualized, as Alice wants him to kiss her foot, while Kurt talks of bondage, and bites her like a vampire. "Vampire" and "cannibal" are significant images in this play and are used as invectives against the captain.

A type of underlying villain in this play are the state laws that unfairly govern divorce and child custody.

The story makes its rampaging way through dark corridors of the human soul towards the conclusion. In the final moment, what has survived amid the emotional and psychological wreckage is, unexpectedly, the marriage. The play ends right where it started.

== Dance of Death II ==
In Dance of Death II, Alice explains that when the Captain fell down in Part I, it was nearly fatal and has left him paralyzed. He is still able to make some financial speculations that ruthlessly benefit himself and cause Kurt to lose his money. Alice seems tougher and less human than before. Judith, the couple's daughter, wants to marry Kurt's son, Allan, as the children are shown attempting to attain more happiness than their parents are able to find. But Kurt's father has sent him away. Judith is portrayed as a youthful vampire, and there is the sense that this family's cycle of "love-hatred" will go on and on.

== Films ==
- The Dance of Death (France, 1948), with Erich von Stroheim
- The Dance of Death (West Germany, 1967), with Lilli Palmer
- Dance of Death (UK, 1969), with Laurence Olivier
- Dödsdansen (Sweden, 1980), TV film by Ragnar Lyth
- La danse de mort (France, 1982), TV film by Claude Chabrol
