= The Movement and the "Madman" =

Feature documentary film

The Movement and the "Madman" (2023) is a feature documentary directed and produced by Stephen Talbot. The documentary covers the 1969 showdown over the war in Vietnam between the peace movement in the United States and President Richard Nixon and National Security Adviser Henry Kissinger. Based on interviews with antiwar activists, historians, and former Kissinger aides, the film shows how two enormous demonstrations in the fall of 1969 pressured Nixon to cancel what he called his “madman” plans to drastically escalate the war, including threats to use nuclear weapons.

== Synopsis ==
Nixon and Kissinger’s "madman" strategy and the various military options under consideration, including resumption of bombing of North Vietnam, the mining of Haiphong harbor, and the use of tactical nuclear weapons, are outlined in what was called Operation Duck Hook and other formerly classified documents shown in the film. Morton Halperin, Roger Morris and Anthony Lake, all of whom were aides to Kissinger in 1969, discuss the secret planning that took place, as well as the threats of escalation that were made to Anatoly Dobrynin, the Soviet ambassador to the United States and to North Vietnamese officials in Paris.

Unaware of Nixon and Kissinger’s escalation threats, leaders of the antiwar movement organized two of the largest demonstrations the country had ever seen: a nationwide Moratorium on October 15, 1969 involving two to three million people and two enormous marches and rallies on November 15, 1969 in Washington, DC and San Francisco. The film shows how these peaceful protests were planned and how they checkmated Nixon’s war plans.

Concerned that backing down on his escalation threats might make him appear weak to Soviet leaders, Nixon called a secret worldwide nuclear alert as a show of force, which is described in the film by William Burr, a senior analyst of the National Security Archive at George Washington University.

Some in the film, including Nixon’s personal aide Stephen Bull, argue that Nixon’s threats to use nuclear weapons in Vietnam were only a bluff meant to intimidate his adversaries, but former RAND analyst and nuclear war planner Daniel Ellsberg states, “The bottom line is I believe we would have had the first nuclear attacks since Nagasaki in 1969 had it not been for the October 15th demonstrations and the demonstrations in November.”

== Production ==
Directed and produced by Stephen Talbot, The Movement and the “Madman” is a co-production of PBS and Glen Park Films LLC. The 83-min. film is entirely composed of archival footage and photos with a soundtrack of audio-only interviews, an original score by Osei Essed, and songs from the 1960s performed by John Lennon, Bob Dylan, Pete Seeger, Phil Ochs, John Fogarty & Creedence Clearwater Revival, Judy Collins, Crosby, Stills & Nash, the Jefferson Airplane, the Byrds, Richie Havens, Peter, Paul & Mary, Jimi Hendrix, and Country Joe McDonald.

The film was edited by Stephanie Mechura and executive produced by Robert Levering.

== Release ==
The Movement and the "Madman" premiered on PBS as a special presentation of American Experience series during Season 35, Episode 4, on March 28, 2023.

A one-hour international version of the film has been broadcast by PBS America in the UK and in Australia by SBS. The full-length version aired in Vietnam on VTV1.

The film has screened at a number of academic conferences and public forums, including one hosted by the Commonwealth Club of San Francisco.

== Reception ==
The National Catholic Reporter called it “a fascinating look at an important chapter in 20th century U.S. history and a celebration of activism’s power.” The Progressive Magazine declared: “A cast of millions—including Daniel Ellsberg, John and Yoko, Country Joe and the Fish, students, trade unionists, housewives—star in this stand-up-and-cheer documentary about peace crusaders versus a president pleading insanity.”

A review in The Guardian said the film “evokes a peak moment of 1960s activism...[director] Talbot’s sure eye for searing images is matched by a perfect ear for songs,” but noted "what the documentary does not do is provide any convincing evidence that the demonstrations prevented the use of nuclear weapon."

The Minnesota Star Tribune noted, "This "American Experience" documentary dives deep into Richard Nixon's under-reported strategy into winning the Vietnam War, one in which he tried to convince the enemy that he was crazy enough to push the nuclear button. The plan fell apart, thanks largely to antiwar protesters. Director Stephen Talbot gets firsthand accounts from key members on both sides of conflict with a rich soundtrack that includes Bob Dylan classics."
