= Michael Verhoeven =

German film director (1938–2024)

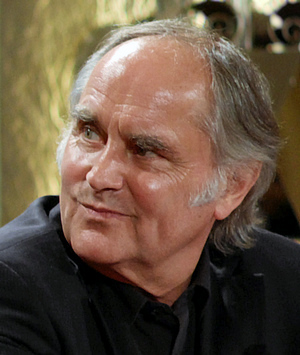
- Verhoeven in 2009
- Born: 13 July 1938; Berlin, Germany
- Died: 22 April 2024 (aged 85); Grünwald, Bavaria, Germany
- Occupations: Film director, screenwriter, producer, actor
- Years active: 1967–2024
- Spouse: Senta Berger (m. 1966)
- Children: Simon Verhoeven; Luca Verhoeven
- Father: Paul Verhoeven
- Relatives: Lis Verhoeven (sister)

Michael Alexander Verhoeven (13 July 1938 – 22 April 2024) was a German film director, screenwriter, film and television producer, and actor. He was also a qualified Doctor of Medicine.

He was considered a political filmmaker. He also achieved international success with films such as The White Rose and The Nasty Girl (1990). He was a filmmaker with a strong stance who dealt intensively with topics such as repression, guilt, and unresolved aspects of German history.

== Biography ==
Michael Verhoeven stemmed from a theatre and film family, the son of the German film director Paul Verhoeven (1901–1975) and actress Doris Kiesow (1902–1973).

Verhoeven met Austrian actress Senta Berger at the Berlinale in 1960, and they played together in front of the camera in the 1963 film Jack and Jenny, where he was supposed to kiss her in one scene. The two fell in love during filming.

Verhoeven and Berger married in 1966 and stayed together until his death in 2024 – in what is considered one of the longest-running scandal-free marriages in show business. Their sons are screenwriter/director/actor Simon Verhoeven (born 1972) and producer/actor Luca Verhoeven (born 1979). Both sons started out as actors and also work in the family business, Sentana Filmproduktion.

Verhoeven died after a short and serious illness in the presence of his family at his home in the Munich suburb of Grünwald, on 22 April 2024. He was 85. He is survived by his wife Senta and the two sons and three grandchildren.

== Career ==
Michael Verhoeven began his career as an artist as a nine-year-old in plays (including a stage adaptation of Pünktchen und Anton based on the novel by Erich Kästner, a friend of the family) and subsequently appeared in films in the 1950s (such as Kästner's The Flying Classroom, The Juvenile Judge and The Crammer with Heinz Rühmann). He directed his first play at the Tübingen Zimmertheater in 1962.

As a young adult, however, Verhoeven decided to study medicine against the wishes of his parents, who encouraged him to continue his acting career. He obtained his doctorate in 1969 with a thesis on psychiatric masking of brain tumors with special consideration of misleading findings and worked as a doctor for several years – including in the USA, where he had followed his wife Senta Berger, who was acting in Hollywood films in the 1960s alongside stars such as Charlton Heston, Dean Martin, Frank Sinatra, Richard Widmark, John Wayne, Kirk Douglas, and Yul Brynner.

Back in Munich in 1965, he founded Sentana Filmproduktion together with his wife and began directing films – starting with The Dance of Death based on August Strindberg's play of the same name. He followed up with two frolicky '60s lifestyle comedies Up the Establishment with Mario Adorf and Gila von Weiterhausen in the leading roles (1968), and Student of the Bedroom (1969), both produced by Rob Houwer.

Verhoeven's political and experimental 1970 anti-Vietnam War film o.k. was entered into the 20th Berlin International Film Festival, but led to a scandal that forced the collapse of the festival without the awarding of any prizes: The then-jury president George Stevens felt offended and threatened to remove the experimental film from the program because of its supposed anti-American invective. The Berlinale regulations were subsequently reformed. Later that year, o.k. went on to win the German Film Award in Gold. For its 50th anniversary, MoMA conducted a special screening in 2021.

In the 1970s, Verhoeven worked increasingly for television, including directing one of the first episodes of Germany's longest-running crime procedural series Tatort (for which he would direct another episode 33 years later in 2005). After becoming a father for the first time in 1972, he wrote and directed the anarchic children's series Krempoli in 1975, in which he played a smaller part and also cast his father Paul Verhoeven and his sister Lis Verhoeven alongside Senta Berger. In 1980, he made the television film Die Ursache with Otto Sander. In the same year, his theatrical release Sunday Children (Sonntagskinder) got screened at the Cannes Film Festival.

In 1982, he wrote, directed, and co-produced the story of the resistance fighters against the Nazi regime, the siblings Hans and Sophie Scholl, in Die weiße Rose (The White Rose). The German Foreign Office banned official screenings abroad when Verhoeven refused to remove a critical commentary from the credits. The film won Silver at the German Film Awards. Based on the true story essay book A Case of Resistance and Persecution, Passau 1933–39, by Anja Romus, he wrote and directed The Nasty Girl ( Das schreckliche Mädchen) in 1990, which won the Silver Bear for Best Director at the 40th Berlinale, the BAFTA for Best Foreign Language Film, Best Foreign Language Film at the 56th New York Film Critics Circle Award, and gained an Oscar nomination for Best Foreign Language Film at the 63rd Academy Awards. These two films cemented his international reputation as an important political voice in European film. Along with his adaptation of George Tabori's memoire My Mother's Courage (with music by his son Simon Verhoeven, who also played a supporting part), and the documentary Der unbekannte Soldat (The Unknown Soldier), Verhoeven was praised for his relentless examination of the Nazi regime in Germany and its aftermath.

Promoting The Nasty Girl in the US in 1990, Verhoeven explained his interest in remembrance culture or rather the lack thereof: “The danger is that we will really forget. But we are very rich right now, and it could happen that we become not quite so rich. Many social problems will show up with the so-called reunification, and with the social problems it could be that Germans again look for enemies. This is what I am scared of. We know so little about Eastern Germany, and the eastern people also don't know too much about our history. What they were told in school is even more wrong than what we were told.”

In 1992, he became a member of the jury at the 42nd Berlin International Film Festival.

Verhoeven became a professor at the Filmakademie Baden-Württemberg in Ludwigsburg in the 1990s, passing on his knowledge to the next generation of filmmakers. For decades, Verhoeven also ran movie theaters in Berlin: the Toni at Antonplatz and the Olympia Filmtheater in Prenzlauer Berg until he sold the properties in the late 2010s.

In 2000, Verhoeven wrote and directed the controversial television film Enthüllung einer Ehe (Uncover of a Marriage), which deals with the then still-taboo subject of transgender identity, for which he won the Robert Geisendörfer Preis, as well as two FIPA Awards at the International Festival of Audiovisual Programmes in Biarritz.

Together with wife Senta Berger, he was awarded the Federal Cross of Merit in 1999 and the Bavarian Order of Merit in 2002. In 2005, Verhoeven received the Marion Samuel Prize, which honors particularly effective ways of combating the forgetting, suppression, and relativization of the crimes committed by Germans during the Nazi era. In 2006, he got an Honorary Lifetime Award from the Bavarian Film Awards.

In 2000, Verhoeven made his first documentary: Der Fall Liebl – Ein Bayer in Togo, about a late repatriate who was unfamiliar with German bureaucracy and was threatened with deportation. In 2006, after seven years of work, his second documentary The Unknown Soldier about reactions to the Wehrmacht exhibition was released. In his 2008 documentary Human Failure (Menschliches Versagen), Verhoeven dealt with the question of the extent to which the German civil population profited from the confiscation of Jewish assets during the Nazi era. The film was screened at the Jerusalem Film Festival. In his 2011 documentary The Second Execution of Romell Broom (Die zweite Hinrichtung – Amerika und die Todesstrafe), made in collaboration with Bayerischer Rundfunk, Verhoeven took on the subject of capital punishment, following the death sentence for Romell Broom, found guilty for rape and murder, and his execution on 15 September 2009 in Lucasville, Ohio, which failed 18 times and was finally aborted.

However, Verhoeven was no stranger to light entertainment, most notably with his 1989 – 2002 television series Die schnelle Gerdi (Fast Gerdi) which starred Senta Berger as a smart and self-reliant Munich cab driver.

Verhoeven was one of the founding members of the Deutsche Filmakademie (German Film Academy, an organisation akin to the Academy of Motion Picture Arts and Sciences) in 2003.

His last directorial and screenwriting work, Let's go!, was adapted in 2014 from the autobiographical novel Von Zuhause wird nichts erzählt by Laura Waco about her Jewish family in postwar Munich.

In 2015, Verhoeven co-produced Welcome to Germany (Willkommen bei den Hartmanns) written, directed, and co-producted by son Simon Verhoeven, in which Senta Berger played the leading role. This sharp-tongued comedy about the 2015 refugee crisis became the most successful German cinema film of the year (3.8 million viewers) and won the German Film Award, the Bavarian Film Award for Best Production, the Audience Award, the Peace Prize of German Film, the Goldene Leinwand, and the Bambi Award, among others.

== Awards ==
- 1970 German Film Award in Gold for o.k.
- 1990 Silver Bear for Best Director, 40th Berlin International Film Festival for The Nasty Girl
- 1995 Bavarian Film Awards, Best Production
- 1999 Order of Merit of the Federal Republic of Germany (with Senta Berger)
- 2000 FIPA Award of International Festival of Audiovisual Programmes in Biarritz for Uncover of a Marriage
- 2001 Robert Geisendörfer Award for Uncover of a Marriage
- 2002 Order of Merit of the Free State of Bavaria (with Senta Berger)
- 2005 Marion Samuel Prize
- 2006 Bavarian Film Awards, Honorary Award

== Selected filmography ==
=== Director ===
Film

- The Dance of Death (1967) – based on The Dance of Death by August Strindberg
- Up the Establishment (1969) – screenplay by Franz Geiger
- Student of the Bedroom (1970) – screenplay by Volker Vogeler, based on a novel by Finn Søeborg
- o.k. (1970)
- He Who Loves in a Glass House (1971)
- MitGift (1976)
- Scrounged Meals (1977) – screenplay by Elke Heidenreich and Bernd Schroeder
- Sunday Children (1980) – based on a play by Gerlind Reinshagen
- Die weiße Rose (1982)
- Killing Cars (1986)
- The Nasty Girl (1990)
- My Mother's Courage (1995) – based on a story by George Tabori
- Let's Go! (2014) – based on an autobiographical novel by Laura Waco

Television

- Der Kommissar: Dr. Meinhardts trauriges Ende (1970, TV series episode)
- Tatort: Kressin und der Mann mit dem gelben Koffer (1972, TV series episode)
- Ein unheimlich starker Abgang (1973) – based on a play by Harald Sommer
- Krempoli – Ein Platz für wilde Kinder (1975, TV series)
- Die Herausforderung (1975) – screenplay by Elke Heidenreich and Bernd Schroeder
- Bier und Spiele (1977, TV series) – screenplay by Bernd Schroeder
- The Singers (1978) – based on a novel by Leonhard Frank
- 1982: Gutenbach (1978) – screenplay by Michael Mansfeld
- Verführungen (1979) – screenplay by Elke Heidenreich
- Freundinnen: Edith und Marlene (1979, TV series episode) – screenplay by Elke Heidenreich and Irene Rodrian
- On Southern Slopes (1980) – screenplay by Manfred Bieler, based on a novella by Eduard von Keyserling
- The Cause of the Crime (1980) – based on a novella and a play by Leonhard Frank
- Die Mutprobe (1982)
- Das Tor zum Glück (1984)
- Stinkwut (1986) – based on a play by Fitzgerald Kusz
- Gunda's Father (1987)
- Gegen die Regel (1987) – screenplay by Daniel Christoff
- Ignaz Semmelweis – Arzt der Frauen (1988) – biographical film about Ignaz Semmelweis
- Die schnelle Gerdi (1989, TV series)
- Schlaraffenland (1990)
- Lilli Lottofee (1992, TV series)
- An Unholy Love (1993)
- Zimmer mit Frühstück (2000) – screenplay by Conny Lens
- Enthüllung einer Ehe (2000) – screenplay with Nicole Walter-Lingen
- Die schnelle Gerdi, second season (2004, TV series)
- Tatort: Die Spieler (2005, TV series episode)
- Bloch: Vergeben, nicht vergessen (2008, TV series episode)
- Bloch: Heißkalte Seele (2012, TV series episode)
- Bloch: Die Lavendelkönigin (2013, TV series episode)
- Glückskind (2014) – based on a novel by Steven Uhly

Documentary and short films

- Tische (1970)
- Bonbons (1971)
- Coiffeur (1973)
- Liebe Melanie (1983) – film about Melanie Horeschowsky
- Das Mädchen und die Stadt oder: Wie es wirklich war (1990)
- The Legend of Mrs. Goldman and the Almighty God (1996) – with George Tabori
- George Tabori – Theater ist Leben (1998) – film about George Tabori
- Der Fall Liebl (2001)
- Die kleine Schwester – Die weiße Rose: Ein Vermächtnis (2002)
- Der unbekannte Soldat (The Unknown Soldier, 2006)
- Menschliches Versagen (Human Failure, 2008)
- The Second Execution of Romell Broom (2012)

=== Producer ===
- Die Spider Murphy Gang (dir. Georg Kostya, 1983)
- Welcome to Germany (dir. Simon Verhoeven, 2016)

=== Actor ===
- The Flying Classroom (1954), as Ferdinand
- Marianne of My Youth (1955), as Alexis
- The Crammer (1958), as Peter Wieland
- That's No Way to Land a Man (1959), as Horst Burkhardt
- The Juvenile Judge (1960), as Fred Kaiser
- Mit 17 weint man nicht (1960), as Richard Denger
- The House in Montevideo (1963), as Herbert
- Tales of a Young Scamp (1964), as Karl Schultheiss
- Onkel Filser – Allerneueste Lausbubengeschichten (1966), as Karl Schultheiss
- Der Kommissar: Dr. Meinhardts trauriges Ende (1970, TV series episode), as Harro Vogt
- Der Kommissar: Kellner Windeck (1971, TV series episode), as Johannes Windeck
