= Michael Maclear =

Michael Maclear, OC (1929 – December 25, 2018) was an Anglo-Canadian journalist, documentary filmmaker, and former correspondent for various CBC programs and for CTV's W5. He is the great-great-grand-nephew of South African astronomer Sir Thomas Maclear.

Born in London, UK in 1929, Maclear moved to Canada in 1954 and joined the Canadian Broadcasting Corporation the next year. As a foreign correspondent for CBC (1961–1971) and the CTV Television Network, he travelled to more than 80 countries.

Maclear made several wartime visits to North Vietnam (1969-1970-1972) for CBC and later for CTV, the first Western TV correspondent granted admission to the North. In 1963, as CBC's Far East correspondent based in Japan, he married Yoko (Mariko) Koide, a news researcher whose contacts with the newsfilm agency Nihon Denpa News and its Hanoi bureau made possible a series of exclusive reports also aired by CBS, NBC and syndicated by The New York Times. Subsequently, Yoko's contacts were key to obtaining Hanoi's military archives for the 13-hour television history "Vietnam: The 10,000 Day War", which Maclear independently produced in 1980.

He received numerous awards, including an ACTRA Award for Best Broadcaster, three Gemini Awards, and the Canadian Film and Television Producers Association's Personal Achievement Award. In 2004, he won the "Outstanding Achievement Award" at Hot Docs, an annual documentary film festival held in Toronto, Ontario, where he was also honoured with a 13-film retrospective.

His daughter, Kyo Maclear, wrote the novel The Letter Opener, published in Canada by HarperCollins in 2007.

== Selected filmography ==
- Vietnam: The Ten Thousand Day War (1980), producer
- The Canadians (1988), writer and executive producer, for CTV
- America at War (2004), director

== Selected publications ==
- The Ten Thousand Day War: Vietnam, 1945-1975 (1981, Methuen; ISBN 0-458-95170-6)
- Vietnam A Complete Chronicle of The WAR (2003. Tess Press; 9781579124076)
- Guerrilla Nation: My Wars in and Out of Vietnam (2013, Dundurn Press ISBN 978-1-45970-940-9)
