= Daniel Lang (writer) =

American journalist and writer

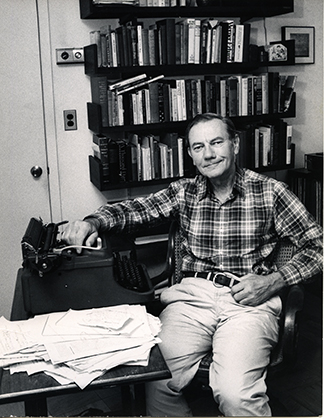
- Photograph © Carl Mydans
- Born: May 30, 1913; New York City
- Died: November 17, 1981 (aged 68)
- Education: B.A. University of Wisconsin
- Occupations: author and journalist
- Known for: staff writer for The New Yorker Magazine
- Spouse: Margaret Altschul
- Parent(s): Fanny and Noosan Lang

Daniel Lang (May 30, 1913 – November 17, 1981) was an American author and journalist. He worked as a staff writer for The New Yorker from 1941 until his death in 1981.

== Life and work ==
Daniel Lang was born on the Lower East Side of New York City to Fanny and Noosan Lang, Hungarian Jewish immigrants. He was raised by his mother and half-sister, Bella Cohen. These early years are described in a semi-autobiographical short story, "The Robbers," by Daniel, and in "Streets, A Memoir of the Lower East Side," written by Bella.

By the time Lang reached high school age, he and his mother had moved to Brooklyn, where he attended Erasmus Hall High School, graduating in 1929. Following high school, he worked for several years, then entered the University of Wisconsin on scholarship, receiving his BA in 1936.

After graduation, Lang worked as a government Works Progress Administration sociologist in the South. His life ambition was to write, however, and he soon found a job at The New York Post. During this time he met Margaret Altschul, a reporter for the New York Journal-American, whom he married in 1942. They were married for 39 years, living and raising their three daughters in New York City.

Recalling Lang's appearance at the New Yorker, former New Yorker editor William Shawn wrote, "He arrived in our offices one day in 1941, shortly before the United States entered the Second World War, with an impressive sheaf of clippings of articles he had written for the New York Post. He was immediately taken onto the staff and soon wrote his first Reporter-at-Large piece on the British American Ambulance Corps.

Lang served as war correspondent for the New Yorker in Italy, France and North Africa. Following the war, he observed and reported on atomic testing. Problems raised by nuclear testing concerning the moral responsibility of scientists remained a keen interest and the topic of many articles over the years. During the Vietnam War era, he became absorbed by the ethical choices raised by this conflict and was one of the first reporters to expose military atrocities against the Vietnamese civilian population. Toward the end of his writing career, he interviewed aging Germans, former Flakhelfer, about their role in the Third Reich, returning to his focus on how individuals can become implicated in evil through denial and the refusal to acknowledge reality.

Many of his New Yorker articles were collected and published in book form and translated into various languages including Spanish, Dutch, German, Polish and Japanese.

William Shawn described Lang's work in this way: "He was one of the most steadfast and talented of our reportorial writers. His writings invariably had moral weight. He was a student of the conscience. Implicit in every piece he wrote was a controlling idea, but he never lapsed into abstraction. He tried very hard to understand the people he wrote about, and far more often than not he succeeded.”

John Hersey stated that Dan focused on significant subjects during his career. In person he was modest, though his goals as an author were extensive. As his work developed, he maintained that his role as a writer was to address the moral aspects of society. The tone of his work was not exaggerated, despite the nature of his themes. The impact of his writing came from its directness. He reached readers through stories about people dealing with the major challenges of the period.

In addition to journalism, Lang wrote poetry, children's literature, short stories and an opera libretto.

His New Yorker article, "The Bank Drama," reported on a hostage situation in Stockholm, Sweden, in 1973, from which psychiatrist Nils Bejerot coined the phrase "Stockholm syndrome."

== Personal life ==
He was married to Margaret Altschul, daughter of banker Frank Altschul and sister of Arthur Altschul. They had three daughters: Frances Lang-Labaree, Helen Lang, and Cecily Lang-Kooyman.

== Books ==
- Early Tales of the Atomic Age. Doubleday and Co. 1948.
- The Man in the Thick Lead Suit. Oxford University Press. 1954.
- From Hiroshima to the Moon. Simon and Schuster. 1959.
- A Summer's Duckling. Harper and Row Publishers. 1963.; illustrated by Dorothy Bayley Morse
- An Inquiry Into Enoughness: of Bombs and Men and Staying Alive. Brandt and Brandt. 1965.
- Lang, Daniel (1969). "Casualties of War". The New Yorker. McGraw-Hill. (also titled Incident on Hill 192) originally published in The New Yorker Magazine
- Patriotism Without Flags. W.W. Norton & Co. 1974.
- A Backward Look: Germans Remember. McGraw-Hill. 1979. ISBN 9780070362390.

== Other works ==
- 1960: "The Robbers" (Story, volume XXXIII, #132 (November–December)
- 1981: "Minutes to Midnight," the libretto for an opera with music composed by Robert Ward, first performed in Miami, 1982.
- 1989: Casualties of War, directed by Brian De Palma, based on the book; starring Sean Penn and Michael J. Fox, with Don Harvey, Ving Rhames, John Leguizamo and John C. Reilly.

== Awards ==
- 1945: Headquarters, Mediterranean Theater of Operations, United States Army awarded Lang the European-African-Middle Eastern Campaign Medal “for performance of duty in support of combat operations in the Mediterranean Theater of Operations.”
- 1946: The U.S. War Department “For outstanding and conspicuous service as an accredited war correspondent serving with our armed forces in an overseas theater of combat.”
- 1969: Society of Magazine Writers for Excellence and the Sidney Hillman Foundation for Casualties of War.
- 1970: The Columbia University of Journalism Graduate School of Journalism presented Lang with The National Magazine Award for Outstanding Achievement in the category of Reporting Excellence. It was cited “for compassion for his material…and his extraordinary portrait of the many faces of a national spirit.”
- 1978: The George Polk Award for Magazine Reporting: A Backward Look: Germans Remember. It was praised “for compassion for his material…and his extraordinary portrait of the many faces of a national spirit.”
- 1990: The PFS Award (Peace) from the Political Film Society for "Casualties of War."
