= Vietnam: The Ten Thousand Day War =

- Written by: Peter Arnett
- Narrated by: Richard Basehart
- Country of origin: Canada
- Original language: English
- No. of episodes: 26

Production
- Executive producer: Michael Maclear
- Producer: Ian McLeod
- Running time: pilot: 52 minutes, regular episodes: 26 minutes

Original release
- Network: CBC
- Release: 22 October 1980 – 1 August 1982

Vietnam: The Ten Thousand Day War, a 26-part half-hour Canadian television documentary about the Vietnam War, was produced in 1980 by Michael Maclear. The series aired in Canada on CBC Television, in the United States on NBC, and in the United Kingdom on Channel 4.

Maclear visited Vietnam during the production of the series and was granted access to film material there. He was the first Western journalist to be allowed to visit Vietnam since the end of the war.

The documentary series was consolidated into 13 hour-long episodes for American television syndication. The series was released on videocassette by Embassy and won a National Education Association award for best world documentary.

Series writer Peter Arnett was an Associated Press reporter in Vietnam from 1962 to 1975.

CBC only aired 18 of the 26 episodes during the 1980–81 season because the production of the series was incomplete. The remaining 8 episodes were broadcast during CBC's 1981–82 season. British audiences saw the series during Channel 4's 1984–85 season.

== Episodes ==
List of episodes:

#	Episode title	CBC airdate	Channel 4 airdate
1	America in Vietnam	16 October 1980	15 October 1984
2	France in Vietnam	16 October 1980	22 October 1984
3	Dien Bien Phu	16 October 1980	29 October 1984
4	Early Hopes	23 October 1980	12 November 1984
5	Assassination	23 October 1980	19 November 1984
6	Days of Decision	30 October 1980	26 November 1984
7	Westy's War	30 October 1980	3 December 1984
8	Uneasy Allies	5 November 1980	7 January 1985
9	Guerilla Society	5 November 1980	14 January 1985
10	The Trail	12 November 1980	21 January 1985
11	Firepower	12 November 1980	28 January 1985
12	The Village War	19 November 1980	4 February 1985
13	Air War	19 November 1980	11 February 1985
14	Siege	26 November 1980	18 February 1985
15	Tet!	10 December 1980	25 February 1985
16	Frontline America	17 December 1980	4 March 1985
17	Soldiering On	31 December 1980	11 March 1985
18	Changing the Guard	7 January 1981	18 March 1985
19	Wanting Out	7 January 1981	25 March 1985
20	Bombing of Hanoi	14 January 1981	1 April 1985
21	Peace and Consequence	14 January 1981	8 April 1985
22	The Prisoners	21 January 1981	15 April 1985
23	The Unsung Soldiers	21 January 1981	22 April 1985
24	Final Offensive	4 February 1981	29 April 1985
25	Surrender	4 February 1981	13 May 1985
26	Vietnam Recalled	11 February 1981	20 May 1985
