= Incident on Hill 192 =

1966 gang-rape and murder during the Vietnam War

The incident on Hill 192 refers to the kidnapping, gang rape, and murder of Phan Thi Mao, a young Vietnamese woman, on November 19, 1966, by an American squad during the Vietnam War. Although news of the incident reached the US shortly after the soldiers' trials, the story gained widespread notoriety through Daniel Lang's 1969 article for The New Yorker and his subsequent book. In 1970, Michael Verhoeven made the film o.k., based on the incident. The Visitors is a 1972 American drama film directed by Elia Kazan also based on the incident. In 1989, Brian De Palma directed the film Casualties of War, which was based on Lang's book.

== Incident ==
On November 17, 1966, Sergeant David Edward Gervase (aged 20) and Private First Class Steven Cabbot Thomas (21)—both members of C Company, 2nd Battalion (Airmobile), 8th Cavalry, 1st Cavalry Division—talked to three other squad members (Privates First Class Robert M. Storeby, 22; cousins Cipriano S. Garcia, 21, and Joseph C. Garcia, 20) about plans to kidnap a "pretty girl" during their reconnaissance mission planned for the next day, and "at the end of five days we would kill her." Storeby also recalled that Gervase claimed it would be "good for the morale of the squad."

At approximately 05:00 on the morning of 18 November, the squad entered the tiny village of Cat Tuong, in the Phu My District, looking for a woman. After finding Phan Thi Mao (21), they bound her wrists with rope, gagged her, and kidnapped her. Later, after setting up camp in an abandoned hooch, four of the soldiers (excluding Storeby) took turns raping Mao. The following day, in the midst of a firefight with the Viet Cong, Thomas and Gervase became worried that the woman would be seen with the squad. Thomas took Mao into a brushy area, and although he stabbed her three times with his hunting knife, he failed to kill her. When she tried to flee, three of the soldiers chased after her. Thomas caught her and shot her in the head with his M16 rifle.

== Aftermath ==
Storeby initially reported the crime. At first, the chain of command, including the company commander, took no action. Despite threats against his life by the soldiers who took part in the rape and murder, Storeby was determined to see the soldiers punished. His persistence in reporting the crime to higher authorities eventually resulted in general courts-martial against his four fellow squad mates. It was during those proceedings that the victim was identified by her sister as Phan Thi Mao.

Thomas, Cipriano Garcia, and Joseph Garcia were each convicted of unpremeditated murder in March and April 1967. Gervase was found guilty on the count of premeditated murder. At the trial of Thomas, who committed the actual stabbing and shooting, the prosecutor asked the jury to impose a death sentence. The court sentenced Thomas to life imprisonment with hard labor. This sentence was first commuted to 20 years, then reduced to eight, which made him eligible for parole after half that time. He was paroled on June 18, 1970.

Gervase's initial sentence of ten years with hard labor was reduced to eight. He was paroled on August 9, 1969. In 1968, Joseph Garcia was acquitted on the appeal of his initial 15-year sentence and his dishonorable discharge was reversed after it was determined that his Fifth Amendment rights were violated, and his confession was ruled as inadmissible. Cipriano Garcia's 4-year sentence was shortened to 22 months. All soldiers (excluding Storeby) were dishonorably discharged from the Army. Gervase died on March 23, 1981. He was 34 years old.

In 1992, former PFC Thomas gained further notoriety when he was charged with being an accessory after the fact in the murder trial of George Loeb, who was charged with the 17 May 1991 shooting death of an African-American USS Saratoga sailor named Harold J. Mansfield. Both Thomas and Loeb were leaders of the Church of the Creator, a white supremacist group. Thomas remained free on bond during the trial, and court records showed that in exchange for his testimony he would only serve one year's probation.

== See also ==
- List of kidnappings (1960–1969)

== Sources ==
- Borch III, Frederic L. (2003). Judge Advocates in Vietnam: Army Lawyers in Southeast Asia 1959-1975. Darby PA: DIANE Publishing. p. 71. ISBN 9781428910645.
- Fitzpatrick, Tom (1989-08-30). "There is yet more to Casualties of War". Phoenix New Times. Archived from the original on 2010-08-08.
- Lang, Daniel (1969-10-18). "Casualties of War". The New Yorker. Vol. XLV, no. 35. New York. p. 61.
- Lang, Daniel (1969). Casualties of War. New York: Pocket Books.
- UPI (March 27, 1967). "GIs Convicted of Rape-Slaying". Tucson Daily Citizen. p. 18.
- Réra, Nathan (2021). Outrages - Casualties of War : de Daniel Lang à Brian de Palma : une enquête. Aix-en-Provence: Rouge Profond.
- Réra, Nathan (2024). Casualties of War: An Investigation. New York: Sticking Place Books.
