= O.k. (film) =

o.k.
- Film poster
- Directed by: Michael Verhoeven
- Written by: Michael Verhoeven
- Produced by: Rob Houwer
- Starring: Gustl Bayrhammer; Eva Mattes; Hartmut Becker; Hanna Burgwitz; Rolf Castell
- Cinematography: Igor Luther; Claus Neumann
- Music by: Axel Linstädt
- Distributed by: Houwer-Film; Film- und Fernsehproduktion Munich
- Release date: June 1970 (Berlin)
- Running time: 79 minutes
- Country: West Germany
- Language: German

o.k., sometimes spelled O.K., is a 1970 West German anti-war film written and directed by Michael Verhoeven. It was chosen as West Germany's official submission to the 43rd Academy Awards for Best Foreign Language Film, but did not receive a nomination. The film was also entered into the 20th Berlin International Film Festival. However, the competition was cancelled and no prizes were awarded, over controversy surrounding the film.

== Plot ==
A four-man US fireteam on patrol seizes a passing young Vietnamese girl and proceeds to torture and kill her. Only one soldier refuses to take part in it and reports this incident to his superior, who dismisses it as a simple wartime incident. As a consequence of his report, the soldier has to fear for his life. Later, the perpetrators are convicted, although subsequent appeals reduce their sentences significantly.

The events take place in a Bavarian forest and depict the 1966 Incident on Hill 192 during the Vietnam War. The soldiers wear US uniforms and have authentic names, but speak with a pronounced Bavarian accent—a conscious directing decision known as the Brechtian distancing effect.

== Cast ==
In alphabetical order

- Gustl Bayrhammer - Captain Vorst
- Hartmut Becker - Ralph Clarke
- Senta Berger - Herself
- Hanna Burgwitz - Josefine
- Rolf Castell - Reilly
- Wolfgang Fischer - Rafe
- Eva Mattes - Phan Ti Mao
- Ewald Precht - Soldier Diaz
- Vera Rheingold
- Peter van Anft
- Michael Verhoeven - Sven
- Friedrich von Thun - Sergeant Tony Meserve
- Rolf Zacher - Rowan

== Controversy ==
During the 1970 Berlin Film Festival, the jury, headed by American film director George Stevens, decided after a 7–2 vote to remove the film from the competition, justifying their decision by citing a FIAPF (International Federation of Film Producers Associations) guideline that said: "All film festivals should contribute to better understanding between nations". The decision came as a result of the film's subject matter (its depiction of the Incident on Hill 192). Stevens, who had served during the Second World War, claimed that the film was anti-American.

One jury member, Dušan Makavejev, protested against this measure, stood up for the film and supported Verhoeven and producer Rob Houwer. Verhoeven defended his film stating: "I have not made an anti-American film. If I were an American, I would even say my film is pro‐American. The biggest part of the American people today is against the war in Vietnam".

Other directors that were taking part in the festival withdrew their films in protest. The jury was accused of censorship and eventually disbanded. No prizes were awarded and the competition was suspended. This scandal had such a big effect that it was unclear if the festival would continue to take place the next year.

== See also ==
- Casualties of War, also depicting the Incident on Hill 192
- List of submissions to the 43rd Academy Awards for Best Foreign Language Film
- List of German submissions for the Academy Award for Best Foreign Language Film
