= Unfinished Symphony: Democracy and Dissent =

2001 film

- Directed by: Bestor Cram; Mike Majoros
- Release date: 2001
- Running time: 59 minutes
- Country: United States
- Language: English

Unfinished Symphony: Democracy and Dissent is a 59-minute documentary film about a protest against the Vietnam War divided into three sections, mirroring the movements of Henryk Górecki's Symphony No. 3, the Symphony of Sorrowful Songs, to which the film is set. Set primarily in Lexington, Massachusetts over Memorial Day weekend in 1971, the film focuses on the three-day protest in the form of a march, staged by newly returned war veterans.

The film premiered in the Documentary Competition at the 2001 Sundance Festival and has screened extensively throughout the United States and in Europe.

== Content ==
The documentary examines a local conflict that reverberated nationally. Following the reverse path of Paul Revere's famous ride of 1775, the protest mounted by war veterans focused on the deeply unpopular war. Nearly 400 veterans, some in wheelchairs, others leaning on crutches, arrived to take part in what they called Operation POW. Over the course of Memorial Day weekend, they marched, sang, distributed flyers, and participated in "guerilla theater," the dramatic reenactment of tactics used against the Vietnamese. All activities were peaceful. The group requested permits from each town along the route.

"Black-and-white filmed footage from the original march is interspersed with shots of the war and recent conversations with historian Howard Zinn. At the protest, veterans voiced their feelings about the horrors they witnessed overseas just months before. "How do you ask a man to be the last man to die in Vietnam?" asks a young, distraught veteran, John Kerry (former United States Secretary of State), at a congressional hearing to stop the war."

"In 1971, over 450 anti-war protesters occupied the historic Lexington Green and refused to leave. The Vietnam Veterans Against the War had organized a three-day march from Concord to Boston — Paul Revere's route in reverse. According to Lexington's by-laws, no one was allowed on the Green after 10 pm, so the selectmen denied the protesters permission to camp there. With many townspeople supporting the veterans, an emergency town meeting was held. When no agreement was reached, the veterans and their Lexington supporters decided to remain on the Green. At 3 am on Sunday morning, they were all arrested - the largest mass arrest in Massachusetts history. After being tried, convicted, and fined $5.00 each, they continued their march to Boston."

What happened on Battle Green prompted an intense debate about civic priorities and the rule of law. All of the selectmen who denied the veterans the permit were turned out of office at the next election.

In the early 1990s, a group of Lexington residents decided to collect oral histories from these events. The resulting interviews became the basis for Unfinished Symphony.

== Director ==
Bestor Cram has over twenty years of experience as a director, producer and cinematographer. He founded Northern Light Productions in 1982, and has built it into a documentary production company producing works ranging from broadcast documentaries to historical, dramatic and educational media to Fortune 500 image pieces. As a cinematographer, Bestor has filmed and videotaped for all the major networks. The company has won awards for its work, and Bestor has won grants and prizes for his independent work. His independent film, Unfinished Symphony, premiered at Sundance in the Documentary Competition in 2001 and has won top honors at film festivals around the world. Bestor holds a BA in economics from Denison University, pursued graduate studies at the West Surrey College of Art and Design in Guildford, England, and has taught film at MIT, and the Maine Film & Television Workshops. He is a Vietnam Veteran.
