= John Pilger =

Australian journalist (1939–2023)

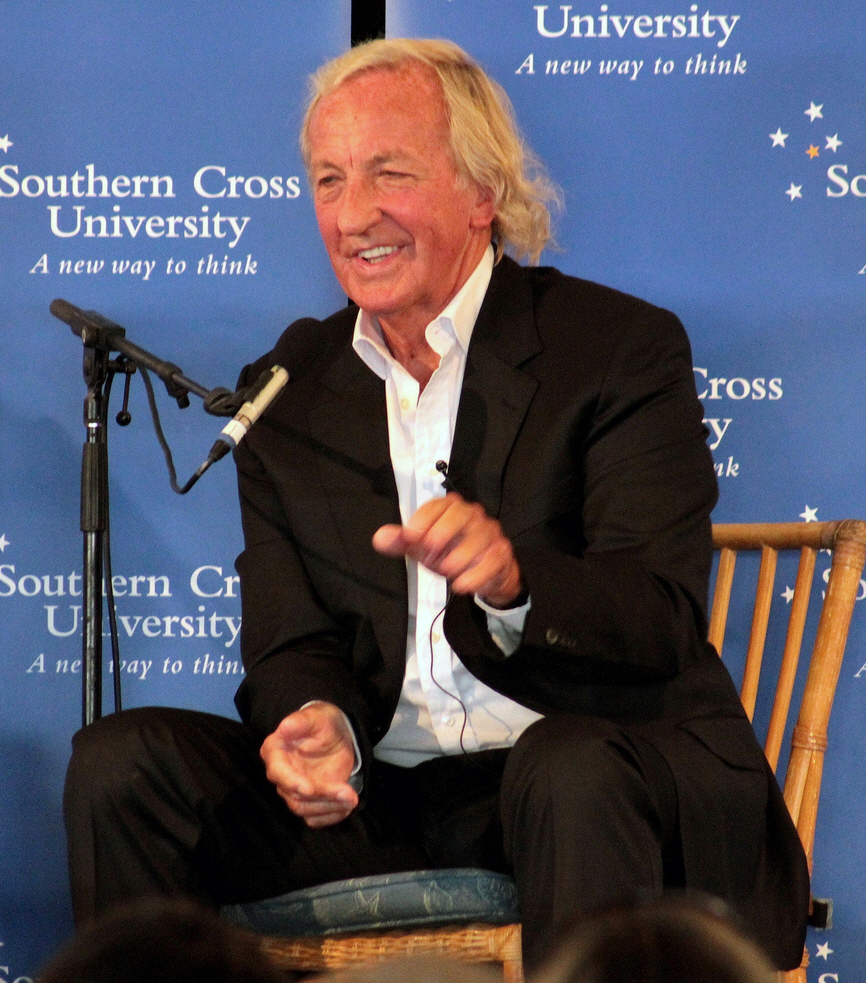
- Pilger in 2011
- Born: 9 October 1939; Bondi, New South Wales, Australia
- Died: 30 December 2023 (aged 84); London, England
- Occupations: Journalist; author; filmmaker
- Spouse: Scarth Flett (divorced)
- Partner: Jane Hill
- Children: 2, including Zoe
- Awards: Full list
- Website: Official website

John Richard Pilger (/ˈpɪldʒər/; 9 October 1939 – 30 December 2023) was an Australian journalist, writer, scholar and documentary filmmaker. From 1962, he was based mainly in Britain. He was also a visiting professor at Cornell University in New York.

Pilger was a critic of American, Australian, and British foreign policy, which he considered to be driven by an imperialist and colonialist agenda. He criticised his native country's treatment of Indigenous Australians. He first drew international attention for his reports on the Cambodian genocide.

Pilger's career as a documentary filmmaker began with The Quiet Mutiny (1970), made during one of his visits to Vietnam, and continued with over 50 documentaries thereafter. Other works in this form include Year Zero (1979), about the aftermath of the Pol Pot regime in Cambodia, and Death of a Nation: The Timor Conspiracy (1993). His many documentary films on indigenous Australians include The Secret Country (1985) and Utopia (2013). In the British print media, Pilger worked at the Daily Mirror from 1963 to 1986, and wrote a regular column for the New Statesman magazine from 1991 to 2014.

Pilger won Britain's Journalist of the Year Award in 1967 and 1979. His documentaries have gained awards in Britain and abroad, including a BAFTA. He came fourth in a poll of 50 heroes of all time by the New Statesman in May 2006.

== Early life and education ==
John Richard Pilger was born on 9 October 1939 in Bondi, New South Wales, the son of Claude and Elsie Pilger. His older brother, Graham (1932–2017), was a disabled rights activist who later advised the government of Gough Whitlam. Pilger was of German descent on his father's side, while his mother had English, German and Irish ancestry; two of his maternal great-great-grandparents were Irish convicts transported to Australia. His mother taught French in school.

Pilger and his brother attended Sydney Boys High School, where he began a student newspaper, The Messenger. He later joined a four-year journalist trainee scheme with the Australian Consolidated Press.

== Newspaper and television career ==
=== Newspaper ===
Beginning his career in 1958 as a copy boy with the Sydney Sun, Pilger later moved to Daily Telegraph in Sydney, where he was a reporter, sportswriter and sub-editor. He also freelanced and worked for the Sydney Sunday Telegraph, the daily paper's sister title. After moving to Europe, he was a freelance correspondent in Italy for a year.

Settling in London in 1962 and working as a sub-editor, Pilger joined British United Press and then Reuters on its Middle-East desk. In 1963, he was recruited by the English Daily Mirror, again as a sub-editor. Later, he advanced to become a reporter, a feature writer, and chief foreign correspondent for the title. While living and working in the United States for the Daily Mirror, on 5 June 1968 he witnessed the assassination of Robert F. Kennedy in Los Angeles during his presidential campaign. He was a war correspondent in Vietnam, Cambodia, Bangladesh and Biafra. Nearly eighteen months after Robert Maxwell bought the Mirror (on 12 July 1984), Pilger was sacked by Richard Stott, the newspaper's editor, on 31 December 1985. Pilger was banned from South Africa in 1967.

Pilger was a founder of the News on Sunday tabloid in 1984 and became its editor-in-chief in 1986. During the period of hiring staff, Pilger was away for several months filming The Secret Country in Australia. Prior to this, he had given editor Keith Sutton a list of people who he thought might be recruited for the paper, but found on his return to Britain that none of them had been hired.

Pilger, however, came into conflict with those around him. He disagreed with the founders' decision to base the paper in Manchester and then clashed with the governing committees; the paper was intended to be a workers' co-operative. Sutton's appointment as editor was Pilger's suggestion, but he fell out with Sutton over his plan to produce a left-wing Sun newspaper. The two men ended up producing their own dummies, but the founders and the various committees backed Sutton. Pilger, appointed with "overall editorial control", resigned at this point before the first issue appeared. The first issue appeared on 27 April 1987 and The News on Sunday soon closed.

Pilger returned to the Mirror in 2001 after the 9/11 attacks, while Piers Morgan was editor. In discussing why he left the paper after only being there for 18 months, he told Ian Burrell of the Independent in 2008: "It was a very rewarding 18 months," he says. "I was happy to keep on writing for the Mirror, but Piers was under pressure from the management and American shareholders who objected to the kind of journalism that he was publishing, often written by me. It was a myth that the readers didn't want a serious approach to journalism in a popular newspaper.""

His most frequent outlet for many years was the New Statesman, where he had a fortnightly column from 1991 when Steve Platt was editor to 2014. In 2018, Pilger said his "written journalism is no longer welcome" in the mainstream and that "probably its last home" was in The Guardian. His last column for The Guardian was in November 2019.

Pilger's work often drew criticism from the political right. The Guardian's obituary noted: "The ferocity of right-wing criticism of his views indicated the effectiveness of his journalism." The right-wing journalist Auberon Waugh criticised Pilger's work (Waugh's own ethics with regard to journalism were noted by the Guardian in his obituary: "Once [Waugh] discovered the delights of the "freebie", he gave breathless accounts of his trips to the Orient, and the wonderful "Thai two-girl massage".) Waugh used the phrase "to Pilger" in reference to John Pilger, intending it to mean "presenting information in a sensationalist manner in support of a particular conclusion".

In its obituary for Pilger, the Daily Telegraph, wrote that "many regarded Pilger as the finest crusading journalist of his generation. He did much to draw world attention to some of the most notorious human rights abuses of the late 20th century". It criticised his 1990 coverage of the Cambodian genocide for not identifying Pol Pot's Khmer Rouge as communists, and criticised his praise for the Vietnam-backed government of Hun Sen for not mentioning that Hun Sen was a former member of the Khmer Rouge. Noam Chomsky said that Pilger made people uncomfortable by exposing the awful reality of US foreign policy. The U.K. journalist William Shawcross described Pilger as "dangerous to the causes which he claims to espouse".

=== Television ===
With the actor David Swift, and the film makers Paul Watson and Charles Denton, Pilger formed Tempest Films in 1969. "We wanted a frontman with a mind of his own, rather like another James Cameron, with whom Richard [Marquand] had worked", Swift once said. "Paul thought John was very charismatic, as well as marketing extremely original, refreshingly radical ideas." The company was unable to gain commissions from either the BBC or ITV, but did manage to package potential projects.

Pilger's career on television began on World in Action (Granada Television) in 1969, directed by Denton, for whom he made two documentaries broadcast in 1970 and 1971, the earliest of more than fifty in his career. The Quiet Mutiny (1970) was filmed at Camp Snuffy, presenting a character study of the common US soldier during the Vietnam War. It revealed the shifting morale and open rebellion of American troops. Pilger later described the film as "something of a scoop" – it was the first documentary to show the problems with morale among the drafted ranks of the US military. In an interview with the New Statesman, Pilger said:

When I flew to New York and showed it to Mike Wallace, the star reporter of CBS' 60 Minutes, he agreed. "Real shame we can't show it here".

He made other documentaries about the United States involvement in Vietnam, including Vietnam: Still America's War (1974), Do You Remember Vietnam? (1978), and Vietnam: The Last Battle (1995).

During his work with BBC's Midweek television series during 1972–73, Pilger completed five documentary reports, but only two were broadcast.

Pilger was successful in gaining a regular television outlet at ATV. The Pilger half-hour documentary series was commissioned by Charles Denton, then a producer with ATV, for screening on the British ITV network. The series ran for five seasons from 1974 until 1977, at first running in the UK on Sunday afternoons after Weekend World. The theme song for the series was composed by Lynsey de Paul. Later the program was scheduled in a weekday peak-time evening slot. The last series included "A Faraway Country" (September 1977) about dissidents in Czechoslovakia, then still part of the Communist Soviet bloc. Pilger and his team interviewed members of Charter 77 and other groups, clandestinely using domestic film equipment. In the documentary Pilger praises the dissidents' courage and commitment to freedom and describes the communist totalitarianism as "fascism disguised as socialism".

Pilger was later given an hour slot at 9 pm, before News at Ten, which gave him a high profile in Britain. After ATV lost its franchise in 1981, he continued to make documentaries for screening on ITV, initially for Central, and later via Carlton Television.

== Documentaries and career: 1978–2000 ==
=== Cambodia ===
In 1979, Pilger and two colleagues with whom he collaborated for many years, documentary filmmaker David Munro and photographer Eric Piper, entered Cambodia in the wake of the overthrow of the Pol Pot regime. They made photographs and reports that were world exclusives. The first was published as a special issue of the Daily Mirror, which sold out. They also produced an ITV documentary, Year Zero: the Silent Death of Cambodia. Whilst filming 'Cambodia: Year One" Pilger was placed on a 'death list' by the Khmer Rouge.

Following the showing of Year Zero, some $45 million was raised, unsolicited, in mostly small donations, including almost £4 million raised by schoolchildren in the UK. This funded the first substantial relief to Cambodia, including the shipment of life-saving drugs such as penicillin, and clothing to replace the black uniforms people had been forced to wear. According to Brian Walker, director of Oxfam, "a solidarity and compassion surged across our nation" from the broadcast of Year Zero.

William Shawcross wrote in his book The Quality of Mercy: Cambodia, Holocaust and Modern Conscience (1984) about Pilger's series of articles about Cambodia in the Daily Mirror during August 1979:

A rather interesting quality of the articles was their concentration on Nazism and the holocaust. Pilger called Pol Pot 'an Asian Hitler' — and said he was even worse than Hitler . . . Again and again Pilger compared the Khmer Rouge to the Nazis. Their Marxist-Leninist ideology was not even mentioned in the Mirror, except to say they were inspired by the Red Guards. Their intellectual origins were described as 'anarchist' rather than Communist".

Ben Kiernan, in his review of Shawcross's book, notes that Pilger did compare Pol Pot's Khmer Rouge to Stalin's terror, as well as to Mao's Red Guards. Kiernan notes instances where other writers' comparisons of Pol Pot to Hitler or the Vietnamese to the Nazis are either accepted by Shawcross in his account, or not mentioned.

Shawcross wrote in The Quality of Mercy that "Pilger's reports underwrote almost everything that refugees along the Thai border had been saying about the cruelty of Khmer Rouge rule since 1975, and that had already appeared in the books by the Reader's Digest and François Ponchaud. In Heroes, Pilger disputes François Ponchaud and Shawcross's account of Vietnamese atrocities during the Vietnamese invasion and near famine as being "unsubstantiated". Ponchaud had interviewed members of anti-communist groups living in the Thai refugee border camps. According to Pilger, "At the very least the effect of Shawcross's 'exposé'" of Cambodians' treatment at the hands of the Vietnamese "was to blur the difference between Cambodia under Pol Pot and Cambodia liberated by the Vietnamese: in truth, a difference of night and day". In his book, Shawcross himself doubted that anyone had died of starvation.

Pilger and Munro made four later films about Cambodia. Pilger's documentary Cambodia – The Betrayal (1990), prompted a libel case against him, which was settled at the High Court with an award against Pilger and Central Television. The Times of 6 July 1991 reported:

Two men who claimed that a television documentary accused them of being SAS members who trained Pol Pot's Khmer Rouge to lay mines, accepted "very substantial" libel damages in the High Court yesterday. Christopher Geidt and Anthony De Normann settled their action against the journalist John Pilger and Central Television on the third day of the hearing. Desmond Browne, QC, for Mr Pilger and Central Television, said his clients had not intended to allege the two men trained the Khmer Rouge to lay mines, but they accepted that was how the program had been understood.

Pilger said the defence case collapsed because the government issued a gagging order, citing national security, which prevented three government ministers and two former heads of the SAS from appearing in court. The film received a British Academy of Film and Television Award nomination in 1991.

=== Thai slavery story ===
In 1982 Pilger authored an article for the Daily Mirror in which he wrote that he had bought an 8-year-old Thai slave girl for £85, and subsequently to have discovered her village of origin in Northern Thailand and returned her to her mother, with Pilger pledging money to support the girl's education. This story was subsequently cast into doubt by the Far Eastern Economic Review (FEER) which wrote that the girl and her mother had been paid to play their respective parts by a taxi-driver hired by Pilger to find a real slave-girl. An article by the right-wing journalist Auberon Waugh in The Spectator commented on the story and Pilger threatened The Spectator with an action for libel.. In responding to The Bulletin's coverage of the issue, Pilger wrote the following on 17 August 1982:

I Do Not Believe I was Hoaxed

"I AM sorry The Bulletin published an article about me (August 3) without seeking my side of the story. The writer, Robert Darroch, quoted me but I never spoke to him: a salutary experience for a journalist such as myself. I appreciate the opportunity to make the following facts clear. I am suing The Spectator and its writer, Auberon Waugh, for one reason and one reason only: that in the June 12 issue Waugh gave approval and credibility to a totally untrue and bogus tale from Bangkok that I, together with the author of a United Nations report on child slavery in Thailand, a photographer and a Thai human rights official, somehow "set up" the buying of a child..."

Pilger went on in his letter to point out that he wasn't in Thailand on the month it was alleged to have occurred.

=== Australia's Indigenous peoples ===
Pilger long criticised aspects of Australian government policy, particularly what he regarded as its inherent racism resulting in the poor treatment of Indigenous Australians. In 1969, Pilger went with Australian activist Charlie Perkins on a tour to Jay Creek in Central Australia. He compared what he witnessed in Jay Creek to South African apartheid. He saw the appalling conditions that the Aboriginal people were living under, with children suffering from malnutrition and grieving mothers and grandmothers having had their lighter-skinned children and grandchildren removed by the police and welfare agencies. Equally, he learned of Aboriginal boys being sent to work on white-run farms, and Aboriginal girls working as servants in middle-class homes as undeclared slave labour.

Pilger made several documentaries about Indigenous Australians, such as The Secret Country: The First Australians Fight Back (1985) and Welcome to Australia (1999). His book on the subject, A Secret Country, was first published in 1989. Pilger wrote in 2000 that the 1998 legislation that removed the common-law rights of Indigenous peoples:

is just one of the disgraces that has given Australia the distinction of being the only developed country whose government has been condemned as racist by the United Nations Committee on the Elimination of Racial Discrimination.

Pilger returned to this subject with the documentary Utopia, released in 2013.

=== East Timor ===
==== Death of a Nation: The Timor Conspiracy ====
In East Timor Pilger clandestinely shot Death of a Nation: The Timor Conspiracy about the brutal Indonesian occupation of East Timor, which began in 1975.

Death of a Nation contributed to an international outcry which ultimately led to Indonesian withdrawal from East Timor and eventual independence in 2000. When Death of a Nation was screened in Britain it was the highest rating documentary in 15 years and 5,000 telephone calls per minute were made to the programme's action line. When Death of a Nation was screened in Australia in June 1994, Foreign Minister Gareth Evans declared that Pilger "had a track record of distorted sensationalism mixed with sanctimony."

== Documentaries and career (2000–2023) ==
=== Palestine Is Still the Issue ===
Pilger's documentary Palestine Is Still the Issue was released in 2002 and had Ilan Pappé as historical adviser. Pilger said the film describes how an "historic injustice has been done to the Palestinian people, and until Israel's illegal and brutal occupation ends, there will be no peace for anyone, Israelis included". He said the responses of his interviewees "put the lie to the standard Zionist cry that any criticism of Israel is anti-semitic, a claim that insults all those Jewish people who reject the likes of Ariel Sharon acting in their name". Its broadcast resulted in complaints by the Israeli embassy, the Board of Deputies of British Jews, and the Conservative Friends of Israel that it was inaccurate and biased. Michael Green, chairman of Carlton Communications, the company that made the film, also objected to it in an interview with The Jewish Chronicle.

The UK television regulator, the Independent Television Commission (ITC), ordered an investigation. The ITC investigation rejected the complaints about the film, stating in its report:

The ITC raised with Carlton all the significant areas of inaccuracy critics of the programme alleged and the broadcaster answered them by reference to a range of historical texts. The ITC is not a tribunal of fact and is particularly aware of the difficulties of verifying 'historical fact' but the comprehensiveness and authority of Carlton's sources were persuasive, not least because many appeared to be of Israeli origin.

The ITC concluded that in Pilger's documentary "adequate opportunity was given to a pro-Israeli government perspective" and that the programme "was not in breach of the ITC Programme Code".

=== Stealing a Nation ===
Pilger's documentary Stealing a Nation (2004) recounts the expulsion of the Chagossians by Britain and the USA between 1967 and 1973 so that the US could construct a military base on their former land. The poor economic situation faced by the Chagossians in Mauritius as a result of the deportation is described in the film. After the expulsion, the United States government leased Diego Garcia, the largest island in the Chagos Islands, from Britain and constructed a major military base there. In the 21st century, the US used the base for planes which were bombing targets in Iraq and Afghanistan.

In a 2000 ruling on the events, the International Court of Justice described the wholesale removal of the Chagossian peoples from the Chagos Islands by Britain as "a crime against humanity". Pilger strongly criticised Tony Blair for failing to respond in a substantive way to the 2000 High Court ruling that the expulsion of the Chagossian people to Mauritius was illegal.

In 2005, Stealing a Nation received the Royal Television Society Award.

=== Latin America: The War on Democracy (2007) ===
The documentary The War on Democracy (2007) was Pilger's first film to be released in the cinema. In "an unremitting assault on American foreign policy since 1945", according to Andrew Billen in The Times, the film explores the role of US interventions, overt and covert, in toppling a series of governments in the region, and placing "a succession of favourably disposed bullies in control of its Latino backyard". It discusses the US role in the overthrow in 1973 of the democratically elected Chilean leader Salvador Allende, who was replaced by the military dictatorship of General Augusto Pinochet. Pilger interviews several ex-CIA agents who purportedly took part in secret campaigns against democratic governments in South America. It also contains what Peter Bradshaw in The Guardian described as "a dewy-eyed interview" with President Hugo Chávez of Venezuela, which has moments of "almost Hello!-magazine deference".

Pilger explores the US Army School of the Americas in the US state of Georgia. Generations of South American military were trained there, with a curriculum including counter-insurgency techniques. Attendees reportedly included members of Pinochet's security services, along with men from Haiti, El Salvador, Argentina and Brazil who have been implicated in human rights abuses.

The film also details the attempted overthrow of Venezuela's President Hugo Chávez in 2002, and the response of the people of Caracas. It looks at the wider rise of populist governments across South America, led by figures calling for loosening ties with the United States and attempting a more equitable redistribution of the continent's natural wealth. Of "Chávez's decision to bypass the National Assembly for 18 months, and rule by decree", Peter Bradshaw writes "Pilger passes over it very lightly".

Pilger said the film is about the struggle of people to free themselves from a modern form of slavery. These people, he says,

describe a world not as American presidents like to see it as useful or expendable, they describe the power of courage and humanity among people with next to nothing. They reclaim noble words like democracy, freedom, liberation, justice, and in doing so they are defending the most basic human rights of all of us in a war being waged against all of us.

The War on Democracy won the Best Documentary category at the One World Media Awards in 2008.

=== The War You Don't See (2010) ===
The subject of The War You Don't See is the role of the media in making war. It concentrates on the wars in Iraq and Afghanistan and Israel's occupation of the Palestinian territories. It begins with the Collateral Murder video leaked by Chelsea Manning and released by WikiLeaks. In an interview, Julian Assange describes WikiLeaks as an organisation that gives power to conscientious objectors within power systems. The documentary contends that the media, far from acting as the fourth estate, instead uncritically reports the official line and spin from governments, and thus delivers propaganda rather than journalism. Pilger states that "propaganda relies on us in the media to aim its deceptions not at a far away country but at you at home".

==== Reception ====
In its review, Time Out magazine said: "This wonderfully researched and outraged film gathers and presents the case for the prosecution. In a world of embedded reporters, sophisticated spin and governmental evasion, what price investigative journalism?"

For Christopher Czechowicz of the Frontline Club: "Perhaps what's most important about this film is its simple message. For John Pilger, the mainstream Fourth Estate is not doing its job properly. Whereas independent journalists are able to articulate the truth in a sophisticated manner, mainstream sources remain disinterested in their work. Time and again, they prefer baseless information, sound bytes and sensational footage of clamouring crowds that rouse emotion to the hard tasks journalists must perform. In Pilger's final remarks in the film, what remains clear is that more than ever, uncompromised, brave journalism is needed in our world, always challenging the official story, in his words, "however patriotic it appears, or however seductive or insidious it is."

When interviewed about the film on Al Jazeera's The Listening Post he was asked that the media could in fact prevent war, Pilger replied that in his own view that the media could in fact stop a war from occurring.

Having been criticised directly in the documentary, with Pilger interviewing Fran Unsworth, the then BBC Head of Newsgathering about its war coverage. The former BBC World News editor, Jon Williams responded to the charge of embedded journalism no longer being objective with the following: "But "embedding" does have real value. There are 9,500 British troops in Afghanistan - and more than 100,000 US service personnel. Theirs is an important perspective, and their operations an important part of the story. The security situation means, sometimes, it is only possible to travel to certain parts of the country as part of a military "embed"."

John Lloyd in the Financial Times said The War You Don't See was a "one-sided" documentary which "had no thought of explaining, even hinting, that the wars fought by the US and the UK had a scrap of just cause, nor of examining the nature of what Pilger simply stated were "lies" – especially those that took the two countries to the invasion of Iraq".

=== Utopia (2013) ===
With Utopia, Pilger returned to the experiences of Indigenous Australians and what he termed "the denigrating of their humanity". A documentary feature film, it takes its title from Utopia, an Aboriginal homeland (also known as an outstation) in the Northern Territory. Pilger says that "in essence, very little" has changed since the first of his seven films about the Aboriginal people, A Secret Country: The First Australians (1985). In an interview with the UK based Australian Times he commented: "the catastrophe imposed on Indigenous Australians is the equivalent of apartheid, and the system has to change".

Reviewing the film, Peter Bradshaw wrote: "The awful truth is that Indigenous communities are on mineral-rich lands that cause mouths to water in mining corporation boardrooms". "When the subject and subjects are allowed to speak for themselves – when Pilger doesn't stand and preach – the injustices glow like throbbing wounds", wrote Nigel Andrews in the Financial Times, but the documentary maker "goes on too long. 110 minutes is a hefty time in screen politics, especially when we know the makers' message from scene one".

Geoffrey Macnab described it as an "angry, impassioned documentary" while for Mark Kermode it is a "searing indictment of the ongoing mistreatment" of the first Australians.

=== The Coming War on China (2016) ===
The Coming War on China was Pilger's 60th film for ITV.

The film premiered in the UK on Thursday 1 December 2016, and was shown on ITV at 10.40 pm on Tuesday 6 December and on the Australian public broadcaster SBS on 16 April 2017. In the documentary, according to Pilger, "the evidence and witnesses warn that nuclear war is no longer a shadow, but a contingency. The greatest build-up of American-led military forces since the Second World War is well under way. They are on the western borders of Russia, and in Asia and the Pacific, confronting China. Like the renewal of post-Soviet Russia, the rise of China as an economic power is declared an 'existential threat' to the divine right of the United States to rule and dominate human affairs".

"The first third told, and told well, the unforgivable, unconscionable tale of what has overtaken the Marshall Islanders since 1946, when the US first nuked the test site on Bikini Atoll" beginning an extended series of tests, wrote Euan Ferguson in The Observer. "Over the next 12 years they would unleash a total of 42.2 megatons. The islanders, as forensically proved by Pilger, were effectively guinea pigs for [the] effects of radiation". Ferguson wrote that the rest of the film "was a sane, sober, necessary, deeply troubling bucketful of worries". Peter Bradshaw in The Guardian wrote that the film "lays bare the historical horrors of the US military in the Pacific, exposing the paranoia and pre-emptive aggression of its semi-secret bases," adding: "This is a gripping film, which though it comes close to excusing China ... does point out China's insecurities and political cruelties". Neil Young of The Hollywood Reporter called the film an "authoritative indictment of American nefariousness in the western Pacific".

Kevin Maher wrote in The Times that he admired the early sequences on the Marshall Islands, but that he believed the film lacked nuance or subtlety. Maher wrote that, for Pilger, China is "a brilliant place with just some 'issues with human rights', but let's not go into that now". Diplomat columnist David Hutt said "Pilger consistently glosses over China's past crimes while dwelling on America's".

=== The Dirty War on the National Health Service (2019) ===
Pilger's The Dirty War on the National Health Service was released in the UK on 29 November 2019 and examined the changes that the NHS had undergone since its founding in 1948. Pilger makes the case that governments beginning with that of Margaret Thatcher have waged a secret war against the NHS with a view to privatising it slowly and surreptitiously. Pilger predicted that moves toward privatisation would create more poverty and homelessness and that the resulting chaos would be used as an argument for further "reform". Prior to the 2019 United Kingdom general election, ITV were embargoed from publicising the documentary (as the election was on the 12th of December 2019). It was later broadcast on 17 December 2019. It was also referenced in a 2020 essay in The Nation magazine, "How to Destroy a National Health Service".

==== Reception ====
Peter Bradshaw described the documentary as a "fierce, necessary film". Emma Simmonds of the Radio Times said: "Pilger is a constant, typically authoritative, slightly doom-laden presence."

== Views (1999–2023) ==
=== Australia ===
Writing for the New Matilda in 2020: "Today, Australia is a vassal state bar none: its politics, intelligence agencies, military and much of its media are integrated into Washington’s “sphere of dominance” and war plans. In Donald Trump's current provocations of China, the US bases in Australia are described as the “tip of the spear”.

=== Bush, Blair, Howard and wars ===
In 2003 and 2004, Pilger criticised United States President George W. Bush, saying that he had used the 9/11 terrorist attacks as an excuse to invade Iraq as part of a strategy to increase US control of the world's oil supplies. In 2004, Pilger criticised British Prime Minister Tony Blair as equally responsible for the invasion and the bungled occupation of Iraq. In 2004, as the Iraq insurgency increased, Pilger wrote that the anti-war movement should support "Iraq's anti-occupation resistance:

We cannot afford to be choosy. While we abhor and condemn the continuing loss of innocent life in Iraq, we have no choice now but to support the resistance, for if the resistance fails, the "Bush gang" will attack another country".

Pilger described Australian Prime Minister John Howard as "the mouse that roars for America, whipping his country into war fever and paranoia about terrorism within". He thought Howard's willingness to "join the Bush/Blair assault on Iraq ... evok[ed] a melancholy history of obsequious service to great power: from the Boxer Rebellion to the Boer war, to the disaster at Gallipoli, and Korea, Vietnam and the Gulf".

On 25 July 2005, Pilger ascribed blame for the 2005 London bombings that month to Blair. He wrote that Blair's decision to follow Bush helped to generate the rage that Pilger said precipitated the bombings.

In his column a year later, Pilger described Blair as a war criminal for supporting Israel's actions during the 2006 Israel–Lebanon conflict. He said that Blair gave permission to Israeli Prime Minister Ariel Sharon in 2001 to initiate what would ultimately become Operation Defensive Shield.

In 2014, Pilger wrote that "The truth about the criminal bloodbath in Iraq cannot be "countered" indefinitely. Neither can the truth about our support for the medievalists in Saudi Arabia, the nuclear-armed predators in Israel, the new military fascists in Egypt and the jihadist "liberators" of Syria, whose propaganda is now BBC news".

=== Barack Obama ===
Pilger criticised Barack Obama during his presidential campaign of 2008, saying that he was "a glossy Uncle Tom who would bomb Pakistan" and his theme "was the renewal of America as a dominant, avaricious bully". After Obama was elected and took office in 2009, Pilger wrote, "In his first 100 days, Obama has excused torture, opposed habeas corpus and demanded more secret government".

Sunny Hundal wrote in The Guardian during November 2008 that the "Uncle Tom" comment used against Obama "highlights a patronising attitude towards ethnic minorities. Pilger expects all black and brown people to be revolutionary brothers and sisters, and if they veer away from that stereotype, it can only be because they are pawns of a wider conspiracy".

=== Capitalism ===
Pilger was opposed to capitalism, believing it to be an unjust system.

=== Support for Julian Assange ===
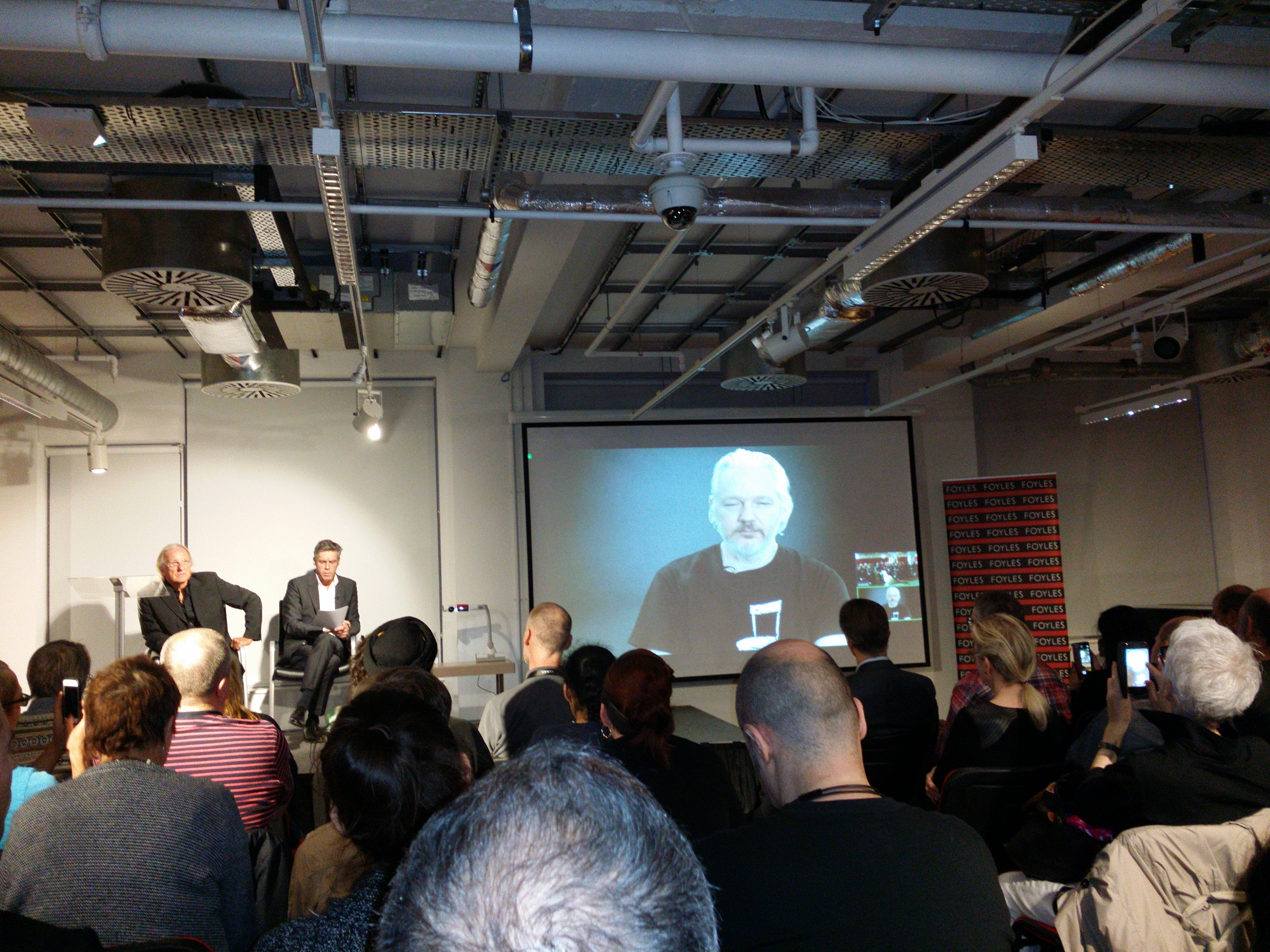
John Pilger, Richard Gizbert, and Julian Assange – 'The WikiLeaks Files' Book Launch – Foyles, London, 29 September 2015

Pilger supported Julian Assange by pledging bail in December 2010. Pilger said at the time: "There's no doubt that he is not going to abscond". Assange sought asylum in the Embassy of Ecuador in London in 2012 and Pilger's bail money was lost when a judge ordered it to be forfeited.

Pilger had been critical of the media's treatment of Assange saying: "The same brave newspapers and broadcasters that have supported Britain's part in epic bloody crimes, from the genocide in Indonesia to the invasions of Iraq and Afghanistan, now attack the "human rights record" of Ecuador, whose real crime is to stand up to the bullies in London and Washington".

He criticised the failure of the Australian government to object when it "repeatedly received confirmation that the US was conducting an 'unprecedented' pursuit of Assange" and noted that one of the reasons Ecuador gave for granting asylum to Assange was his abandonment by Australia.

Pilger visited Assange in the embassy and continued to support him.

=== Comments about Donald Trump and Hillary Clinton ===
In a February 2016 webchat on the website of The Guardian newspaper, Pilger said "Trump is speaking straight to ordinary Americans". Although his opinions about immigration were "gross", Pilger wrote that they are "no more gross in essence than, say, David Cameron's – he is not planning to invade anywhere, he doesn't hate the Russians or the Chinese, he is not beholden to Israel. People like this lack of cant, and when the so-called liberal media deride him, they like him even more". In March 2016, Pilger commented in a speech delivered at the University of Sydney during the 2016 United States presidential election, that Donald Trump was a less dangerous potential President of the United States than Hillary Clinton.

In November 2016, Pilger said that "notorious terrorist jihadist group called ISIL or ISIS is created largely with money from [the government of Saudi and the government of Qatar] who are giving money to the Clinton Foundation".

In August 2017, in an article published on his website, Pilger wrote that a "coup against the man in the White House is under way. This is not because he is an odious human being, but because he has consistently made clear he does not want war with Russia. This glimpse of sanity, or simple pragmatism, is anathema to the 'national security' managers who guard a system based on war, surveillance, armaments, threats and extreme capitalism". According to Pilger, The Guardian had published "drivel" in covering the claims "that the Russians conspired with Trump". Such assertions, he wrote, are "reminiscent of the far-right smearing of John Kennedy as a 'Soviet agent'".

=== Russia ===
With the absence of a Russian "invasion" a bitter disappointment to its most avid promoters in London, this expose of Operation Orbital, the British army's secretive role in Ukraine, is recommended.

— John Pilger, three days before Russian forces invaded Ukraine, on Twitter

Pilger was a member of Committee of Supporters for the RAW in WAR Anna Politkovskaya Award. He had chosen Anna Politkovskaya's work to a book edited by him, Tell Me No Lies: Investigative Journalism And Its Triumphs (2004). Pilger also signed a petition demanding an international commission of inquiry to discover the truth behind Politkovskaya's murder.

In an article in The Guardian, Pilger wrote in May 2014 that Vladimir Putin "is the only leader to condemn the rise of fascism in 21st-century Europe". Historian Timothy Snyder assessed this statement as inaccurate since Russia at the time had organized meetings of European fascists and was subsidizing France's far Right party, the National Rally, until 2018 known as the National Front. Pilger quoted in the article a Jewish doctor who had tried to rescue people from the burning trade union building during the 2014 Odesa clashes, and was stopped by Ukrainian Nazis with the threat that this fate would soon befall him and other Jews and that what happened yesterday would not have happened even during the fascist occupation in World War II. This claim was factually false, as several tens of thousands of Jews were murdered in three days in October 1941. It turned out that the man's quote came from a Facebook page that had been identified as a fake before the article was published.

On the poisoning of Sergei and Yulia Skripal on 4 March 2018, Pilger said in an interview on Russia's RT: "This is a carefully constructed drama as part of the propaganda campaign that has been building now for several years in order to justify the actions of NATO, Britain and the United States, towards Russia. That's a fact". Such events as the Iraq War, "at the very least should make us sceptical of Theresa May's theatrics in Parliament". He hinted that the UK government may have been involved in the attack, saying it had motive and that the nearby Porton Down laboratory has a "long and sinister record with nerve gas and chemical weapons".

In January 2022 Pilger repeatedly denied that Russia was about to invade Ukraine, doing so even three days before the invasion. Following the start of the invasion, Pilger condemned Russia's actions, but stated that they were due to the enlargement of NATO towards Russia.

=== On journalism education ===
Since being invited to open the University of Lincoln's journalism school in 2004, Pilger told the packed room at its launch that "Too often courses are like factories churning out conformist journalists for the industry. They tend to promote a ‘top-down’ kind of journalism which prioritises elite sources. Too rarely do they promote journalism that prioritises the views of ‘ordinary’ people. From my experience these are the people I can trust the most.”

Pilger disagreed with the term mainstream media in 2009 lecture to students at the University of Lincoln: "He disputed the label of “mainstream”, preferring to label it “corporate”, as the most prominent media outlets are often controlled by large corporations. “Those whose journalism is meant for the most people are the mainstream.”"

In conversation with Charles Glass at the Frontline club in 2012, Pilger commented that:

“Journalism students should be taught to be sceptical of their employers, sceptical of their governments. Governments are still portrayed as benign if they’re ours, and if they’re other’s, they’re not.”

“Media is an extension of power but when we recognise that we become aware of official drivel and understand that the truth is subversive. It always is."

Writing for Arena Online in 2022, Pilger said: "When will we allow ourselves to understand? Training journalists factory style is not the answer. Neither is the wondrous digital tool, which is a means, not an end, like the one-finger typewriter and the linotype machine. In recent years, some of the best journalists have been eased out of the mainstream. ‘Defenestrated’ is the word used. The spaces once open to mavericks, to journalists who went against the grain, truth-tellers, have closed."

In an interview with the Independent's Rob Brown in 1998 he noted the difficulty journalism students had in securing work: "You say lots of allegedly wise things to students and at the end they invariably ask the same question: 'How do we get a job?' That's a big pressure on young people. It's made the true maverick in journalism an endangered species. People simply cannot afford to be mavericks any more."

Remarking in an interview with Ian Burrell of the Independent in 2008 that "...many start œwith the same passion I started with" and implores them to "keep your principles as you navigate the system". His watchword remains, 'Never believe anything until it's officially denied,' a favourite expression of reporter Claud Cockburn, father of Independent journalist Patrick Cockburn.

== Criticism of corporate journalism ==
In 2008, in an interview with Ian Burrell of the Independent, Pilger remarked: ""The influence of The Independent and Guardian are much greater than you would think. I don't believe the majority of people in Britain have the so-called values of The Daily Telegraph and the Daily Mail and certainly not The Sun. That doesn’t mean to say they flock to read the Guardian and the Independent, clearly they don’t. But on occasion, these newspapers speak up and gesture towards people, or they pretend to. Without them there would be an entirely closed media.”

He disagreed with the concept of mainstream media, telling an audience at the University of Lincoln in 2009:

"I think the public is beginning to see the corporate media as a system of propaganda, a monoculture whose differences — rather like party politics — are illusory.”"

Pilger criticised many journalists of the corporate media. During the administration of President Bill Clinton in the US, Pilger described the British-American Project as an example of "Atlanticist freemasonry". He wrote in November 1998 that "many members are journalists, the essential foot soldiers in any network devoted to power and propaganda". In 2002, he said that "many journalists now are no more than channellers and echoers of what Orwell called the official truth".

In 2003 he criticised what he called the "liberal lobby" which "promote killing" from "behind a humanitarian mask". He said David Aaronovitch exemplified the "mask-wearers" and noted that Aaronovitch had written that the attack on Iraq will be "the easy bit". Aaronovitch responded to an article by Pilger about the mainstream media in 2003 as one of his "typical pieces about the corruption of most journalists (ie people like me [Aaronovitch]) versus the bravery of a few (ie people like him)".

In an address at Columbia University on 14 April 2006, Pilger said:

During the Cold War, a group of Russian journalists toured the United States. On the final day of their visit, they were asked by their hosts for their impressions. 'I have to tell you,' said their spokesman, 'that we were astonished to find after reading all the newspapers and watching TV, that all the opinions on all the vital issues were by and large, the same. To get that result in our country, we imprison people, we tear out their fingernails. Here, you don't have that. What's the secret? How do you do it?'

On another occasion, while speaking to journalism students at the University of Lincoln, Pilger said that mainstream journalism means corporate journalism. As such, he believes it represents vested corporate interests more than those of the public.

=== BBC ===
Pilger wrote in December 2002, of British broadcasting's requirement for "impartiality," as being "a euphemism for the consensual view of established authority". He wrote that "BBC television news faithfully echoed word for word" government "propaganda designed to soften up the public for Blair's attack on Iraq". In his documentary The War You Don't See (2010), Pilger returned to this theme and accused the BBC of failing to cover the viewpoint of the victims, civilians caught up in the wars in Afghanistan and Iraq. He additionally pointed to the 48 documentaries on Ireland made for the BBC and ITV between 1959 and the late-1980s which were delayed or altered before transmission, or totally suppressed.

== Personal life ==
Pilger was married to journalist Scarth Flett, granddaughter of the physician and geologist John Smith Flett. His children include Zoe Pilger, with journalist Yvonne Roberts.

Outside of news and current affairs, Pilger enjoyed cooking, surfing, TV and sport. He appeared on BBC Radio 4's Desert Island Discs in 1990, where he named Joseph Heller's Catch-22 as his favourite book and "Blue Moon of Kentucky" by Elvis Presley as his favourite song, and chose a typewriter as his luxury item.

== Death and tributes ==
Pilger died of pulmonary fibrosis in London on 30 December 2023, at the age of 84; he is survived by Jane Hill, his partner for thirty years.

=== Tributes ===
The managing director of Media and Entertainment at ITV, Kevin Lygo, said "John was a giant of campaigning journalism. He had a clear, distinctive editorial voice which he used to great effect throughout his distinguished filmmaking career. His documentaries were engaging, challenging and always very watchable [...] He eschewed comfortable consensus and instead offered a radical, alternative approach on current affairs and a platform for dissenting voices over 50 years"

A number of journalists paid tribute to Pilger upon his death, including the BBC's World Affairs Editor John Simpson, former Channel 4 News presenter Jon Snow, Solomon Hughes of Private Eye, and Ros Wynne-Jones of the Daily Mirror.

The academic journal Ethical Space provided a number of tributes to Pilger, in addition to being collated on his website. The 45th News and Documentary Emmy Awards also paid tribute in 2024 (at 1:44). The BFI hosted the panel: The Pilger Effect: A celebration of the life and work of John Pilger.

== Honours and awards ==
The Press Awards, formerly the British Press Awards:

- 1966: Descriptive Writer of the Year
- 1967: Journalist of the Year
- 1970: International Reporter of the Year
- 1974: News Reporter of the Year
- 1978: Campaigning Journalist of the Year
- 1979: Journalist of the Year

Other awards:

- 1991: Television Richard Dimbleby Award, BAFTA
- 1991: At 19th International Emmy Awards Emmy for documentary 'Cambodia, the Betrayal'
- 2009: Sydney Peace Prize
- 2003: Sophie's Prize
- 2011: Grierson Trust Award, UK
- 2017: Order of Timor-Leste

Honours

- 1994: An Honorary Doctor of Letters by the University of Staffordshire
- 1995: An Honorary Doctor of Philosophy by Dublin City University
- 1997: An Honorary Doctor of Arts by Oxford Brookes University
- 1999: An Honorary Doctor of Laws by University of St Andrews
- 2001: A Doctor Of The university by the Open University
- 2003: Frank H.T. Rhodes Class of '56 Professor at Cornell University
- 2008: An Honorary Doctor of Letters by Rhodes University
- 2008: An Honorary Doctor of Arts awarded by the University of Lincoln

== In popular culture ==
A documentary filmmaker named John Pillinger appeared in an Iron Man Extremis comic book story written by Warren Ellis in January 2005. Pillinger interviews war profiteer Tony Stark for his documentary film The Ghosts of the Twentieth Century.

In Rap News 7, Revolution spreads to America by Juice Rap News, Pilger's impersonation employed his characteristics from his intonation, piece to camera and employed Pilgerist language from 'the war you don't see' to 'the two party system'.

== Archive and legacy ==
In 2008, he was awarded the Doctor of Arts by the University of Lincoln and opened its school of journalism in 2004. In an interview with the Linc (the University of Lincoln's student newspaper) asked about how the award would be appreciated alongside his other awards, he replied: "Well, it’s already in pride of place on the wall of my office!"

The John Pilger Archive is now housed at the British Library. The papers can be accessed through the British Library catalogue. It was launched and based at the University of Lincoln from 2009 to 2017. The archive features his news reports, films and radio broadcasts and was digitised by former PhD student, now Senior Lecturer in Journalism, Dr Florian Zollmann.

In an article for the New Matilda, ABC Brisbane presenter, David Iliffe spoke to Chris Graham, the new Matilda editor and associate producer of Utopia about John's legacy.

The UK's Information Research Department (IRD), a department of the Foreign Office, opened a file on Pilger in 1975. The file was passed to the Foreign Office's Special Production Unit when the IRD was shut down in 1977. Declassified UK published an article on the declassified files, which showed he was under covert monitoring; commenting prior to his death Pilger remarked "My reporting, which was really exclusive, it was telling people something that they didn't know, it was exposing a great deal, it was exposing the tyrants, but it was also exposing who was backing the tyrants secretly – it’s rather embarrassing."

== Bibliography ==
Books

- The Last Day (1975)
- Aftermath: The Struggles of Cambodia and Vietnam (1981)
- The Outsiders (with Michael Coren, 1984)
- Heroes (1986), ISBN 978-1407086293 (2001)
- A Secret Country (1989)
- Distant Voices (1992 and 1994)
- Hidden Agendas (1998)
- Reporting the World: John Pilger's Great Eyewitness Photographers (2001)
- The New Rulers of the World (2002; 4th ed. 2016)
- Tell Me No Lies: Investigative Journalism and its Triumphs (ed.) Cape (2004)
- Freedom Next Time (2006)

Plays

- The Last Day (1983)

=== Documentaries ===
- World in Action
  - "The Quiet Mutiny" (1970)
- Conversations With a Working Man (1971)
- Palestine Is Still The Issue (Part 1) (1974)
- Vietnam: Still America's War (1974)
- Guilty Until Proven Innocent (John Pilger) (1974)
- Thalidomide: The Ninety-Eight We Forgot (1974)
- The Most Powerful Politician in America (1974)
- One British Family (1974)
- Pilger
  - "An Unfashionable Tragedy" (1975)
  - "Nobody's Children" (1975)
  - "Zap-The Weapon is Food" (1976)
  - "Pyramid Lake is Dying" (1976)
  - "Street of Joy" (1976)
  - "A Faraway Country" (1977)
- Mr Nixon's Secret Legacy (1975)
- Smashing Kids] (1975)
- To Know Us Is To Love Us (1975)
- A Nod & A Wink (1975)
- Pilger in Australia (1976)
- Dismantling A Dream (1977)
- An Unjustifiable Risk (1977)
- The Selling of the Sea (1978)
- Do You Remember Vietnam (1978)
- Year Zero: The Silent Death of Cambodia (1979)
- The Mexicans (1980)
- Cambodia: Year One (1980)
- Heroes (1980)
- Island of Dreams (John Pilger)(1981)
- In Search of Truth in Wartime (1983)
- Nicaragua. A Nations Right to Survive (1983)
- The Outsiders (series, 1983)
- The Truth Game (1983)
- Burp! Pepsi V Coke in the Ice Cold War (1984)
- The Secret Country: The First Australians Fight Back (1985)
- Japan Behind the Mask (1987)
- The Last Dream (1988)
  - "Heroes unsung"
  - "Secrets"
  - "Other People's Wars"
- Cambodia: Year Ten (1989)
- Cambodia, the Betrayal (1990)
- War By Other Means (1992)
- Cambodia: Return to Year Zero (1993)
- Death of a Nation: The Timor Conspiracy (1994)
- Flying the Flag, Arming the World (1994)
- Vietnam: The Last Battle (1995)
- Inside Burma: Land of Fear (1996)
- Breaking the Mirror – The Murdoch Effect (1997)
- Apartheid Did Not Die (1998)
- Welcome to Australia (1999)
- Paying the Price: Killing the Children of Iraq (2000)
- The New Rulers of the World (2001)
- Palestine Is Still the Issue (2002)
- Breaking the Silence: Truth and Lies in the War on Terror (2003)
- Stealing a Nation (2004)
- The War on Democracy (2007)
- The War You Don't See (2010)
- Utopia (2013)
- The Coming War on China (2016)
- The Dirty War on the NHS (2019)
