= Utopia (2013 film) =

2013 Australian documentary film

- Directed by: John Pilger
- Country of origin: Australia
- Original language: English

Production
- Producer: John Pilger
- Running time: 110 minutes

Original release
- Release: 15 November 2013 (UK)
- Release: 17 January 2014 (Australia)

Utopia is a 2013 documentary film written, produced and presented by John Pilger and directed by Pilger and Alan Lowery, that explores the experiences of Aboriginal Australians in modern Australia. The title is derived from the Aboriginal homeland community of Utopia, Northern Territory, one of the poorest and most desolate areas in Australia.

== Synopsis ==
The film begins with Pilger's journey to Utopia to observe the changes that have occurred in Aboriginal Australia between 1985, when he featured the poverty in the documentary The Secret Country and the time of filming, 2013. After almost three decades, Pilger discovers that Aboriginal families are still living in extremely overcrowded and poorly sanitized asbestos shacks, and are plagued by easily curable diseases. The Secretary General of Amnesty International, Salil Shetty, who happens to be in Utopia at the same time as Pilger, ponders why one of the world's richest countries cannot solve the problem of Aboriginal poverty and states that the inequity and injustice could be fixed if the will to do so existed. The film goes on to explore some of the issues currently afflicting Australia such as; failed health policies, Aboriginal deaths in police custody, mining companies failing to share the wealth they have acquired with the first Australians and the disputed allegations made by the media and government that there were pedophile rings, petrol warlords and sex slaves in Aboriginal communities and the resulting 2007 intervention. The film also features a visit to Rottnest Island, Western Australia, where an area that was used as a prison for Aboriginal people until 1931, has now been converted into a luxury hotel where tourists are not even informed of the island's brutal history.

Utopia highlights that Aboriginal Australians in Australia are currently imprisoned at 10 times the rate that South Africa imprisoned black people under apartheid, rates of rheumatic heart disease and trachoma among Aboriginal Australians are some of the highest in the world and suicide rates are increasing, especially among youths. Pilger informs viewers that unlike the US, Canada and New Zealand, no treaty was ever negotiated between the indigenous peoples of Australia and the colonists and that the abandonment of the mining tax in 2010 lost an estimated $60 billion in revenue, which he argues was more than enough to fund land rights and to end all Aboriginal poverty.

== Political impact ==
In Western Australia, the Police Minister was sent to a screening of Utopia by the state government, and the State Premier held discussions with Aboriginal leaders on some of the issues highlighted in the film.

In the Northern Territory, government representatives were advised to defend the existing policies against any concerns raised by the community due to the film.

John Pilger, when discussing the impact and relevance of Utopia stated:

That Australian governments believe they can manipulate and discriminate against Aboriginal communities in a manner that has been described in the UN as 'permissively racist' is astonishing in the 21st century. How ironic that as Nelson Mandela was buried and venerated, another form of the system he fought against was alive and well in Australia.

— John Pilger, The Guardian.

== Reception ==
On review aggregator Rotten Tomatoes, 100% of 13 critic reviews are positive.

=== Australia ===
Peter Galvin in a review for SBS gave the film 3 of 5 stars, commenting "despite its flaws in conception and coverage, this is an angry and sorrowful film about an important subject and it's typical of Pilger." Eden Caceda of Filmink described the documentary as a "bleak but powerful film" in which "Pilger reminds us that resolving the issues of Indigenous people is far from over".

Gerard Henderson, dismissing Pilger as a FIFOE (Fly In, Fly Out Expatriate), wrote in The Australian that the film contains "close to two hours of unremitting propaganda" in which the journalist "states and restates his case." Henderson also wrote that Pilger simply ignored Aboriginal leaders who did not fit into his thesis, those whom he considered "part of the political elite" in Australia.

Kieran Finnane of Alice Springs News criticised the film, writing that "The film cannot rightly be called 'documentary' or 'journalism' if those words are still to have any standards attached to them. It does not ask questions, other than ones Pilger thinks he knows the answers to and to which he can lead his interviewee. It does not seek out or fairly treat a single dissenting point of view. It does not recognise complexity. It has all the irksome smugness – and the sing-song voice to boot – of a man in a pulpit who is quite sure of being right."

AFL player Adam Goodes found the silence about Utopia in mainstream Australia and the assertion that the film doesn't show the good or other side of Aboriginal Australia disturbing and hurtful and wrote in The Sydney Morning Herald that "Utopia has shown me how, over 225 years, the Europeans, and now the governments that run our country, have raped, killed and stolen from my people for their own benefit. The total injustices that have been played out since colonisation are absolutely shameful, and I now find it hard to say I am proud to be Australian."

=== United Kingdom ===
David Parkinson, writing in Britain's Empire magazine, commented that "the filmmaker firebrand is in pungent form as he dismantles the hypocrisy of Australia's treatment of its indigenous peoples." Charlotte O'Sullivan of the London Evening Standard wrote that "what brings the material alive is Pilger's visit to Mutitjulu" where an Australian Broadcasting Corporation television programme in 2006 concocted an entirely fictitious story about a pedophile ring run by community leaders, which led to police moving families off their land. "The final shocker is that the territory vacated turned out to be rich in minerals and is now being vigorously mined."

Reviewing the film, Peter Bradshaw wrote: "The awful truth is that Indigenous communities are on mineral-rich lands that cause mouths to water in mining corporation boardrooms." "When the subject and subjects are allowed to speak for themselves – when Pilger doesn't stand and preach – the injustices glow like throbbing wounds", wrote Nigel Andrews in the Financial Times, but the documentary maker "goes on too long. 110 minutes is a hefty time in screen politics, especially when we know the makers' message from scene one.

According to Geoffrey Macnab, this "angry, impassioned documentary [reveals that] indigenous communities still live in 'unchanging, shocking poverty'." Mark Kermode wrote that the film amounts to a searing indictment of the ongoing mistreatment of the first Australians.

== Intended audience ==
Pilger states that Utopia was filmed for both Australian and international audiences. He believes most Australians are mostly unaware of Indigenous history and culture.

== Cast ==
(As themselves)

- Prof. Jon Altman – anthropologist and economist, Australian National University
- Pat Anderson – co-author, Little Children are Sacred report
- Mal Brough – Minister for Indigenous Affairs 2006–07
- Michael Degnan – doctor
- Robert Eggington – Dumbartung Aboriginal Corporation director
- Selina Eggington – Dumbartung Aboriginal Corporation grief counsellor
- Lorna Fejo – Stolen Generations survivor
- Vincent Forrester – Aboriginal elder, Mutitjulu, Northern Territory
- Gerry Georgatos – suicide prevention researcher University of Western Australia
- Paddy Gibson – senior researcher at Jumbunna Indigenous House of Learning, University of Technology Sydney and social justice campaigner
- Tjanara Goreng Goreng – senior official, Department of Indigenous Affairs, 2005–08
- Chris Graham – journalist New Matilda
- Lang Hancock (archive footage) – mining magnate (deceased)
- Olga Havnen – former Northern Territory Government Co-ordinator General, Remote Services
- John Howard (archive footage) – former Prime Minister of Australia
- Vince Kelly – President of the Police Union Northern Territory
- Rosalie Kunoth-Monks – Alyawarre / Arrernte elder
- Vincent Lingiari (archive footage) – Aboriginal activist, leader of Gurindji Strike (deceased)
- Marianne Mackay – Aboriginal activist from Perth
- Jeff McMullen – journalist and broadcaster formerly with the Australian Broadcasting Corporation and Channel 9 60 Minutes
- Amy McQuire – former editor of Tracker and journalist with New Matilda
- Patricia Morton-Thomas – film producer and actor
- Arthur Murray – Leader of Aboriginal cotton-chipper strike at Wee Waa, New South Wales, and father of Eddie Murray (deceased)
- Leila Murray (archive footage) – mother of Eddie Murray (deceased)
- Noel Nannup – Nyungar elder
- George Newhouse – lawyer for the Mutitjulu community
- Alastair Nicholson – former Chief Justice, Family Court of Australia
- Margaret Quirk – WA Minister for Corrective Services, 2006–08
- Bob Randall – Aboriginal elder, Mutitjulu
- Gina Rinehart – mining tycoon and richest person in Australia
- Kevin Rudd – former Prime Minister of Australia
- Maurie Ryan, Australia's First Nations Political Party – grandson of Gurindji strike leader Vincent Lingiari
- Salil Shetty – Secretary General, Amnesty International
- David Smith – Manager, Ampilatwatja Health Centre
- Warren Snowdon – Minister for Indigenous Health 2009–13
- Dave Sweeney – Australian Conservation Foundation
- Dr. Janelle Trees – general practitioner, Mutitjulu
- Dr. Hilary Tyler – co-author, Central Australian Specialists report
- Paula Ann Williams – visitor

== International broadcasting ==
Country	Network(s)/Station(s)
Australia (origin)	SBS, NITV
New Zealand	Māori TV
United Kingdom	ITV

== See also ==
- The Secret Country (1985)
- Welcome to Australia (1999)
