= Anti-war film =

Genre of film that is opposed to warfare in its theming or messaging

An anti-war film is a sub-genre of war film that is opposed to warfare in its theming or messaging.

== Characteristics ==
Anti-war films typically argue that war is futile, unjust, a loss for all involved, only serves to benefit few in society (usually an elite or ruling class, or the state), makes people do or support things they normally would not (such as homicide or discrimination), is extremely costly both in money and lives, or is otherwise undesirable for those fighting it, the target audience, or everyone in general. To illustrate their point, anti-war films often present the effects of war—such as destruction, suffering, war trauma, casualties, war crimes, war's impact on the environment or on children, or the excesses of war—in a negative manner. Though many anti-war films make this negative depiction explicit and clear for the audience to understand, some are more subtle in delivering their anti-war messaging (such as making the ostensibly good side as brutal as their enemies), or may use parody and black comedy to satirize wars and conflicts.

While most anti-war films use real historical or then-ongoing conflicts—commonly modern wars in recent memory that the intended audience is familiar with or understands, such as World War I, World War II, the Vietnam War, or the war on terror—as their settings to criticize those wars, their casus belli, or their effects, others use hypothetical conflicts (e.g. World War III), fictional wars involving fictional countries, or even a conflict in a fictional universe, an alternate history, or the far future. Some anti-war films may not depict front line or battlefield conflict at all, and instead present anti-war messaging through depictions of the rear, military hierarchy, military operations other than war, military misconduct or corruption, the military–industrial complex, refugees and survivors, or the aftermath of wars, ranging from the immediate post-war recovery to the post-apocalypse.

Within this category of anti-war films that choose to de-emphasize the actual battlefield conflicts of war, some films specifically focus on communicating pacifist ideologies by emphasizing war's devastating effects on innocent civilians and the lands in which war is waged. This niche of anti-war films often utilizes visceral imagery that confronts viewers with the tragic realities of war's presence in beloved main characters' lives, such as by depicting main characters' homes being decimated by war bombs, main characters being forced to contend with the uncomfortable, off-putting presence of soldiers in their city, and characters dealing with the emotional toll of witnessing war's violence in their own life or the lives of their loved ones. According to film researcher Lindsay Smith, by forcing viewers to see war through the lens of its devastation on beloved fictional characters, these anti-war films make it accessible for audiences—regardless of their knowledge or experience with war's effects in the real world—to empathize with war's victims since emphasizing the human costs of war can make its violence feel more real and personal.

Anti-war films have sometimes been accused of anti-Americanism by the American right wing. These accusations can be somewhat attributed to the fact that there are definitive examples of modern anti-war films that are specifically motivated by criticisms of American militarism in particular rather than the violence of war as a whole. One such prominent example is Howl's Moving Castle, a Japanese anti-war film made by pacifist Hayao Miyazaki as a direct criticism of the Iraq War, which was a war waged by US-led forces in Iraq as part of America's ongoing War on Terror in response to 9/11. Miyazaki declared that he expected and intended for Howl's Moving Castle to fail with American audiences due to its direct critique of America's military actions in Iraq, thus framing the film as seemingly un-American in its anti-war commentary.

== Criticism ==
Several filmmakers and critics have been quoted as stating that "there is no such thing as an anti-war film", a statement often attributed to François Truffaut. This school of criticism argues that cinema is inherently "an inadequate medium through which to convey the horrors of conflict" and that portrayals of combat may inadvertently glorify warfare by emphasizing the adventure, thrill and camaraderie of combat. Supposedly failed anti-war films in this regard include Full Metal Jacket and Saving Private Ryan. The former was described by filmmaker Samuel Fuller as "another goddamn recruiting film", with Fuller arguing that teenage viewers could come away impressed by the idea of wartime combat. The latter has also attracted criticism for its portrayal of the United States' role in World War II; film scholar Toby Miller argued that the film legitimized the idea of the United States as "the last great saviour of humanity".

The criticism has also been applied to films that are more commonly regarded as anti-war. Director Francis Ford Coppola has rejected the description of Apocalypse Now as an anti-war film, arguing that its spectacular depictions of combat can produce an appreciation of violence rather than opposition to it. Coppola contrasted his film with what he considered a genuinely anti-war film, The Burmese Harp, which he argued presents an alternative based on "love and peace and tranquillity and happiness" rather than spectacular combat. Critics have similarly argued that the film's visually striking presentation of warfare, including its helicopter assault sequence, can undermine or complicate its anti-war themes.

Other critics have argued that the problem is not necessarily the depiction of violence itself, but the way in which audiences are encouraged to identify with soldiers, heroes and military objectives. In this view, a film can condemn the suffering caused by war while simultaneously presenting military service, sacrifice or combat as meaningful and heroic. Saving Private Ryan, for example, has been described as "anti-pain" and "anti-death" while nevertheless presenting the Allied war effort as justified. This distinction has led some scholars and critics to differentiate between films that are opposed to the suffering and brutality of war and those that question the legitimacy or necessity of war itself.

The apparent contradiction is particularly evident in films that attempt to depict warfare realistically. Elem Klimov's Come and See is frequently cited as an example of a film that successfully avoids romanticizing combat. Roger Ebert described it as one of the most devastating films ever made and noted that, unlike conventional war films, its depiction of war offers little opportunity for excitement or identification with military heroism. Other critics have likewise regarded the film as an unusually effective anti-war work because its violence is presented primarily through terror, physical degradation and psychological trauma rather than through heroic combat. Nevertheless, even Come and See has been analyzed as potentially complicating the anti-war label because its depiction of Nazi atrocities can simultaneously imply that armed resistance was necessary and morally justified.

The debate has continued with more recent war films. Alex Garland and Ray Mendoza's Warfare (2025), which depicts a disastrous Iraq War mission from the perspective of a group of United States Navy SEALs, was variously described as both an anti-war film and a potential military-recruitment film. Critics who regarded it as anti-war emphasized its graphic depiction of catastrophic injuries, confusion and psychological suffering, while others argued that its narrow focus on the soldiers' experience does not directly question the political or strategic purposes of the war. The controversy illustrates the broader difficulty of defining the genre: depicting war as horrific does not necessarily constitute an argument that war itself is illegitimate, and a film can simultaneously condemn the experience of combat while affirming the cause for which the characters fight.

== List of anti-war films ==
The following is a list of anti-war films.

Film	Year	Ref(s)
1917	2019	
All Quiet on the Western Front	1930, 1979, 2022	
Aman	1967	
Amazing Grace and Chuck	1987	
The Americanization of Emily	1964	
American Sniper	2014	
Apocalypse Now	1979	
Barefoot Gen	1983	
The Battle of Algiers	1966	
Beasts of No Nation	2015	
Breaker Morant	1980	
Das Boot	1981	
Born on the Fourth of July	1989	
The Boy with Green Hair	1948	
The Bridge on the River Kwai	1957	
A Bridge Too Far	1977	
Die Brücke	1959	
The Burmese Harp	1956	
Les Carabiniers	1963	
Casualties of War	1989	
Catch-22	1970	
Civilization	1916	
Come and See	1985	
Coming Home	1978	
Les Croix de bois	1932	
Cross of Iron	1977	
The Day the Earth Stood Still	1951	
The Deer Hunter	1978	
Don't Cry, It's Only Thunder	1982	
Dr. Strangelove	1964	
Empire of the Sun	1987	
The Enemy Below	1957	
L'Ennemi Intime	2007	
Escalation	1968	
Fahrenheit 9/11	2004	
Fail Safe	2000	
Fail-Safe	1964	
Fear and Desire	1953	
Field of Honor	1986	
Fires on the Plain	1959	
First Blood	1982	
Flags of Our Fathers	2006	
The Forgotten Battle	2020	
Forrest Gump	1994	
Fort Apache	1948	
The Four Horsemen of the Apocalypse	1921	
Free State of Jones	2016	
F.T.A.	1972	
Friend of the World	2020	
Friendly Fire	1979	
Full Metal Jacket	1987	
Gallipoli	1981	
Gardens of Stone	1987	
Godzilla	1954	
Go Tell the Spartans	1977	
Grace Is Gone	2007	
The Great War	1959	
La Grande Illusion	1937	
Grave of the Fireflies	1988	
The Great Dictator	1940	
The Greatest Beer Run Ever	2022	
Greenery Will Bloom Again	2014	
Greetings	1968	
The Glassworker	2024	
The Ground Truth	2006	
Hacksaw Ridge	2016	
Hair	1979	
Hamburger Hill	1987	
Hearts and Minds	1974	
Hedd Wyn	1992	
Hell Is for Heroes	1962	
Hell on Earth	1928	
Henry V	1989	
A Hidden Life	2019	
Hiroshima mon amour	1959	
Hijacking Catastrophe	2004	
Hotel Rwanda	2004	
How I Won the War	1967	
Howl's Moving Castle	2004	
The Human Bullet	1968	
The Human Condition	1959-1961	
Iluminados por el fuego	1989	
In the Valley of Elah	2007	
Innocent Voices	2004	
J'accuse	1919	
Jarhead	2005	
Jacob's Ladder	1990	
Johnny Got His Gun	1971	
Jojo Rabbit	2019	
Journey's End	1930	
Joyeux Noël	2005	
Kameradschaft	1931	
Kanal	1956	
Kelly's Heroes	1970	
King and Country	1964	
King of Hearts	1966	
Letters from Iwo Jima	2006	
Lions for Lambs	2007	
Little Big Man	1970	
Lord of War	2005	
Love and Honor	2013	
Major Dundee	1965	
Manufacturing Consent: Noam Chomsky and the Media	1992	
Many Wars Ago	1970	
M*A*S*H	1970	
Maudite soit la guerre	1914	
Memphis Belle	1990	
The Memory of Justice	1978	
Men in War	1957	
Merry Christmas, Mr. Lawrence	1983	
Mickey Mouse in Vietnam	1969	
Nausicaä of the Valley of the Wind	1984	
Neighbours	1952	
No Man's Land	2001	
None but the Brave	1965	
Off Limits	1988	
Oh! What a Lovely War	1969	
The Oil Factor	2004	
O.k.	1970	
On the Beach	1959	
Once Upon a Time in the Middle East	2026	
The Outlaw Josey Wales	1976	
Palestine Is Still the Issue	2002	
The Panama Deception	1992	
Paths of Glory	1957	
The Patrol	2014	
Paying the Price: Killing the Children of Iraq	2000	
Peace on Earth	1939	
Peace, Propaganda & the Promised Land	2004	
Pink Floyd – The Wall	1982	
Platoon	1986	
Pretty Village Pretty Flame	1996	
Pride of the Marines	1945	
Purple Sunset	2001	
The Red Baron	2008	
Redacted	2007	
Rendition	2007	
The Road Back	1937	
The Road to Glory	1936	
The Road to Guantanamo	2006	
Romero	1989	
Rosa Luxemburg	1986	
Salvador	1986	
The Sand Pebbles	1966	
Savior	1998	
Shame	1968	
Shenandoah	1965	
Sir! No Sir!	2005	
Slaughterhouse-Five	1972	
Soldier Blue	1970	
Sophie Scholl – Die letzten Tage	2005	
The Sorrow and the Pity	1969	
Stalingrad	1993	
Stop-Loss	2008	
Taegukgi	2004	
Tango Charlie	2005	
Taxi to the Dark Side	2007	
Taxi for Tobruk	1960	
Tell England	1931	
Tell Me Lies	1968	
Testament	1983	
The Thin Red Line	1998	
Things to Come	1936	
Threads	1984	
Three Comrades	1938	
Three Kings	1999	
Tigerland	2000	
Too Late the Hero	1970	
Toys	1992	
Triage	2009	
Triumph Over Violence	1968	
Turtles Can Fly	2004	
Under the Flag of the Rising Sun	1972	
The Unknown Soldier	2017	
Unmanned: America's Drone Wars	2013	
Verdun, visions d'histoire	1929	
Vice	2018	
The Visitors	1972	
Waltz with Bashir	2008	
The War	1994	
The War at Home	1996	
War, Inc.	2008	
The War on Democracy	2007	
War Made Easy: How Presidents & Pundits Keep Spinning Us to Death	2007	
The Water Diviner	2014	
We Are Many	2014	
Welcome to Dongmakgol	2005	
Westfront 1918	1930	
When the Wind Blows	1986	
When Trumpets Fade	1998	
Why We Fight	2005	
Wicked Spring	2002	
The Wind Rises	2013	
Winter Soldier	1972	

== See also ==
- List of anti-war books
- List of anti-war songs
- List of anti-war plays
- List of films about nuclear issues
- List of peace activists
