= Paying the Price =

Paying the Price may refer to:

- Paying the Price (1916 film), 1916 silent film
- Paying the Price (1927 film), 1927 silent film
- Paying the Price (A Touch of Frost), an episode of the T.V. series A Touch of Frost
- Paying the Price (The Bill), an episode of the T.V. series The Bill

== See also ==
- Paying the Price: Killing the Children of Iraq, a 2000 T.V. documentary
