= Vietnam: The Last Battle =

- Screenshot of title card
- Written by: John Pilger
- Directed by: David Munro
- Starring: John Pilger
- Music by: Steven Faux
- Original language: English

Production
- Producer: David Munro
- Cinematography: Jimmy Dibling
- Editor: Joe Frost
- Running time: 51 minutes
- Production company: Carlton Television

Original release
- Release: 1995

Vietnam: The Last Battle is a 1995 Carlton Television documentary, written and presented by John Pilger, and directed by David Munro, which returns to Vietnam nearly twenty years after the Vietnam War had ended to review those two decades.

== Synopsis ==
Pilger introduces the film, on the 20th anniversary of the end of the conflict, from the roof of the U.S. Embassy, Saigon, where the last American troops had departed by helicopter. Veteran Bobby Muller, interviewed on China Beach, calls the war a lie and talks about his own belief of this soon after his landing there in 1965. Pilger states that Ho Chi Minh had quoted from the U.S. Declaration of Independence and sought support from Washington for his nation’s independence. An elderly woman, who lost her husband and five children fighting the French and the Americans, is shown as an exemplar of the struggle for independence. Coal miner Pham Ngo Duc describes the massive American bombing, which, according to Pilger, journalists James Cameron and Harrison Salisbury, were vilified for reporting. Pilger recounts the final evacuation of the U.S. Embassy and what he deems as the "peaceful" arrival of the North Vietnamese, which ended the war.

Under embargo from the U.S., which according to Pilger used its influence to sabotage World Bank loans, the country turned to the Soviet Union. EC Bridging Programme co-ordinator Michael Culligan discusses the return of Vietnamese boat people such as fisherman Mac Van Nhan admits his regrets at having fled the post-war regime. Sociologist Nguyen Thi Oanh states that the liberalising policy of Doi Moi has brought many benefits to the country but threatens its soul, whilst government economic advisor Nguyễn Xuân Oánh espouses market socialism which, according to Pilger, has abolished co-operatives and left the population as a cheap labour pool for international exploitation. Prof. Võ Quý and Dr. Pham Viet Thanh reveal the deforestation and the high rates of birth defects resulting from the Operation Ranch Hand spraying of dioxin.

Following Bill Clinton's lifting of the trade embargo, in return for the payment US$140 million of war debts incurred by South Vietnamese, Hanoi has been gentrified for foreigners by exclusive developments discussed by property developers Peter Purcell and Alfonso L. DeMatties. Prof. Nguyen Van Xang recalls the 1972 Christmas Bombing of the Bạch Mai Hospital and the recent privatisations which he says have undermined the national health service. Nguyễn Xuân Oánh and Nguyen Thi Oanh respond to official British Government documents recommending the "exploitation" of Vietnam's cheap labour in the EPZs. An elderly resident recalls the My Lai Massacre, the site of which Pilger contrasts with the Củ Chi tunnels tourist site. Film producer David Puttnam, video store assistant Andrea Barnes and Vietnamese-American Phan Quan critique Hollywood movies promoting a self-pitying American view of the conflict, which Robert Muller traces back to Ronald Reagan. Nguyen Thi Oanh states that, because of its victory, Vietnam, unlike the U.S., has been able to move on from the war.

== Participants ==
- Robert Muller – Vietnam Veterans of America Foundation
- Pham Ngo Duc – Coal miner
- Michael Culligan – EC Bridging Programme
- Mac Van Nhan – Fisherman
- Nguyen Thi Oanh – Sociologist
- Nguyễn Xuân Oánh – Senior economic advisor, Government of Vietnam
- Prof. Võ Quý – Environmentalist, Hanoi University
- Dr. Pham Viet Thanh – Vice Director, Tu Du Hospital Saigon
- Peter Purcell – Property Developer
- Alfonso L. DeMatties – Property Developer
- Prof. Nguyen Van Xang – Bach Mai Hospital
- Sir David Puttnam – Film Producer
- Phan Quan – Vietnamese American
- Andrea Barnes – Video store assistant
