= Death of a Nation (1994 film) =

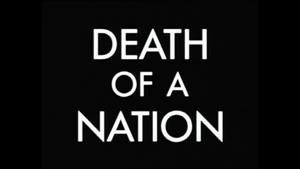
- Film title card
- Also known as: Death of a Nation: The Timor Conspiracy
- Written by: John Pilger
- Directed by: David Munro
- Starring: John Pilger
- Music by: Agio Periera
- Country of origin: United Kingdom
- Original language: English

Production
- Producer: David Munro
- Cinematography: Bob Bolt; Preston Clothier; Simon Fanthorpe; David Munro; Max Stahl
- Editor: Joe Frost
- Running time: 96 minutes
- Production company: Carlton Television

Original release
- Release: 1994

Death of a Nation: The Timor Conspiracy is a 1994 Central Independent Television documentary, written and presented by John Pilger, and directed and produced by David Munro, which documents the involvement of Western governments in the Indonesian invasion and occupation of East Timor. "Accusations of genocide fly in this disturbing and controversial British documentary", writes Sandra Brennan of Allmovie, as well as, "disturbing accusations regarding the complacency of the U.S., British, and Australian governments who purportedly knew about the killing and did nothing". An updated version of the film entitled The Timor Conspiracy was released in 1999, the year in which Indonesia surrendered control of East Timor.

== Participants ==
- Alan Clark - former British Defence Minister
- James Dunn - former Australian consul in East Timor
- Gareth Evans - Australian Foreign Affairs Minister
- Abel Guterres - Timorese exile
- José Ramos Horta - Timorese Foreign Minister, in exile
- C. Philip Liechty - senior CIA officer in Indonesia
- Konis Santana - Commander, Timorese resistance
- Shirley Shackleton - wife of murdered reporter
- Mário Soares - President of Portugal
- Sir Alan Thomas - head, British Defence Sales
- Nugroho Wisnumurti - Indonesian ambassador to UN
- Richard Woolcott - former Australian ambassador to Indonesia

== Awards ==
- 1994 Amsterdam International Documentary Film Festival Zapper Award: David Munro (Won)
