= Inside Burma: Land of Fear =

- Screenshot of title card
- Written by: John Pilger
- Directed by: David Munro
- Starring: John Pilger
- Music by: Steven Faux
- Country of origin: United Kingdom
- Original language: English

Production
- Producers: David Munro; Roger James
- Cinematography: Jimmy Dibling; David Munro
- Editor: Joe Frost
- Running time: 51 minutes
- Production company: Carlton Television

Original release
- Network: Central Independent Television
- Release: 1996

Inside Burma: Land of Fear is a 1996 Central Independent Television documentary, written and presented by John Pilger, which was directed by David Munro. The two men worked undercover in order to investigate the use of slave labour in Burma.
