= The Secret Country =

The Secret Country may refer to:

- The Secret Country: The First Australians Fight Back (1985), a television documentary about the persecution of Aboriginal Australians
- The Secret Country (1985), a book by Pamela Dean
- The Secret Country (2005), a book by Jane Johnson
