= Yvonne Roberts =

British journalist

- Citizenship: British
- Education: University of Warwick
- Occupations: Journalist; Author; Political Writer in Residence
- Notable work: The Trouble With Single Women Every Woman Deserves an Adventure
- Spouse: John Pilger (separated)
- Partner: Stephen Scott
- Children: 1, Zoe
- Website: https://www.theguardian.com/profile/yvonneroberts

Yvonne Roberts is a freelance English writer and journalist. She was born in 1948 in Newport Pagnell, Buckinghamshire and has worked in newspaper and television journalism. She has published sixteen books, including novels and discussions of human relations and parenting.

== Early life and education ==
Roberts' family moved to Madrid when she was a few months old and lived there for three years. She lived in a number of locations through the rest of her childhood. She was educated at Warwick University between 1967 and 1969, where one of her tutors was historian E. P. Thompson.

== Career ==
Roberts began her career in journalism in 1969-1971 as a reporter and feature writer at the Northampton Chronicle & Echo. In 1971 she was winner of the Young Journalist of the Year Award. She was employed on London Weekend Television's Weekend World (1972–77), The London Programme (1977–79) and ITV's This Week from 1988. She worked on the short-lived tabloid the News on Sunday, and contributed to The Times, Evening Standard, New Statesman and The Independent. In 1990 she joined the staff of The Observer, to which she had previously contributed as chief leader writer.

Roberts is a senior fellow at the Young Foundation. She has two daughters: Zoe Pilger (born 1984), from a previous relationship with journalist John Pilger; and Grace Scott, with her husband Stephen Scott, who was a producer on BBC's Panorama.

She was the first Political Writer in Residence at Sussex University in 2016-17

== Political and social views ==
Roberts has compared Jeremy Corbyn to Clement Attlee. She says that both men adhered to principles that people were ready to accept. She wrote, "What many of the so-called expert political analysts and Labour MPs who rate polish and pragmatism over consistency and conviction failed to recognise is precisely what many of the young spotted immediately – Corbyn’s integrity. Whatever his alleged failings as a manager of colleagues, younger voters have been attracted to his unashamedly steadfast leftwing vision. One that promises investment in the NHS, in childcare, in schools, in social care, renationalising utilities, making the state a catalyst for higher skills, improved production, more money raised from tax revenues as the number of real jobs grow and, along with it, the economic security and hope of ordinary families, for so long absent".

Roberts also believes that the system frequently fails psychiatric patients. She wrote about Sarah Reed, a seriously mentally ill woman who died on remand in Holloway Prison following what a coroner's inquest said was neglect and inappropriate treatment. According to Roberts: "The inability of mental health services to cope means [that] thousands of vulnerable women like Sarah are on a conveyor belt to understaffed prisons where, frequently, harsh discipline is imposed".
