= The War You Don't See =

2010 film by John Pilger

- Theatrical poster
- Directed by: Alan Lowery; John Pilger
- Written by: John Pilger
- Produced by: Alan Lowery; John Pilger
- Starring: John Pilger; Rageh Omaar; Dan Rather; Mark Curtis; Carne Ross; Cynthia McKinney; Julian Assange
- Narrated by: John Pilger
- Cinematography: Rupert Binsley
- Edited by: Joe Frost
- Music by: Sacha Puttnam
- Production company: Dartmouth Films
- Release date: 13 December 2010
- Running time: 97 minutes
- Country: United Kingdom
- Language: English

The War You Don't See is a 2010 British documentary film written, produced and directed by John Pilger with Alan Lowery, which challenges the media for the role they played in the Iraq, Afghanistan, and Israel/Palestine conflicts. The film, which went on nationwide general release on 13 December 2010, had its premiere at the Barbican and was aired through Britain's ITV1 on 14 December 2010 and later through Australia's SBS One on 10 April 2011.

== Participants ==
- Professor Stuart Ewen – media historian
- Professor Melvin Goodman – former CIA analyst
- Dan Rather – CBS Evening News anchor and managing editor, 1981–2005
- Bryan Whitman – US Assist. Secretary of Defence
- Rageh Omaar – BBC world affairs reporter, 2000–2006
- Dahr Jamail – journalist & author, Beyond the Green Zone
- David Rose – former Observer journalist
- Steve Rendall – Fairness & Accuracy in Reporting
- Fran Unsworth – BBC Head of Newsgathering
- David Manion – Editor in Chief, ITV News
- Mark Curtis – historian & author, Web of Deceit
- Phil Shiner – Public Interest Lawyers
- Guy Smallman – war reporter & photographer
- Carne Ross – British Foreign Office, 1989–2004
- Professor Greg Philo – Glasgow University Media Group
- Cynthia McKinney – former US Congresswoman
- Julian Assange – Editor in Chief, WikiLeaks

== Reception ==
On review aggregator Rotten Tomatoes, 80% of 5 critic reviews are positive.

The Guardian film reviewer Peter Bradshaw states that, "The force of his film is in its contention that the colossal scale of civilian casualties is, within the grammar of news, downgraded in importance so that it doesn't figure as news at all, but as all-but-invisible deep background to be ignored". "Pilger gives due respect to WikiLeaks," he concludes, "although his praise for al-Jazeera's independence is ironic, given that WikiLeaks has just revealed the possibility that the Qatar government is manipulating the channel."

The Guardian television reviewer John Crace states that, "Pilger has never traded in anything other than black and white," and "Pilger's starting point is that all governments are shysters whose only interest is economic and all journalists are witless dupes," which, "had the feel of slight overkill," but "For all his lack of subtlety, he presents his case with passion and conviction." "What shone through," he concludes, "was that those we rely on to think clearly in times of war are often those most seduced by myopic machismo and that any sense of history gets instantly forgotten."

John Lloyd wrote in the Financial Times that Pilger asserted the British and American media tried to advocate that "wars were noble, should be fought, and that death for one’s country was both sweet, and right". Lloyd thought that individuals disagreeing with Pilger's interpretation were "ruthlessly marshalled into a narrative that gave them no quarter" and that by juxtaposing "two strongly put points of view" those watching "could have made up" their own minds. According to Lloyd, Pilger "showed, in his demolition of propaganda – which is what he calls government statements or politicians’ arguments – the mastery of the propagandist arts".

Total Film reviewer Tom Dawson describes the film as a, "timely, potent doc," with, "an impressive range of interviewees, including 'embedded' war correspondents and whistleblowers," but concludes that, "it's the leaked footage of a US chopper attack on unarmed Baghdad residents that proves the film’s most disturbing scoop."
