= Breaking the Silence: Truth and Lies in the War on Terror =

- Screenshot of title card
- Written by: John Pilger
- Directed by: John Pilger; Steve Connelly
- Starring: John Pilger
- Music by: Nick Russell-Pavier
- Original language: English

Production
- Producers: Christopher Martin; Richard Clemmow
- Cinematography: Preston Clothier
- Editor: Andrew Denny
- Running time: 52 minutes
- Production company: Carlton Television

Original release
- Network: Carlton Television
- Release: 2003

Breaking the Silence: Truth and Lies in the War on Terror is a 2003 Carlton Television documentary written and directed by John Pilger, produced by Christopher Martin and co-directed by Steve Connelly. In the film, Pilger presents a personal view of "the truth and lies in the 'war on terror'."

== Synopsis ==
The documentary attempts to contrast the proclaimed aims of the war on terror with what Pilger sees as the humanitarian failures in countries such as Afghanistan and Iraq. It asserts that the Afghan mujahideen and Afghan Arabs including Osama bin Laden, from which later both the Taliban and Al Qaeda were created, received support from the United States and from Britain's MI6. Pilger alleges that President Jimmy Carter authorised a five-hundred-million dollar programme to help set up the native Afghan mujahideen, starting as early as six months prior to the Soviet invasion into Afghanistan.

== Reviews ==
It is referred to as an "excellent film" in the book Iraq: The Logic of Withdrawal. It won a Commendation or Honorable Mention award at a 2004 film and video festival.

== Awards and festival screenings ==
- Gold Award, WorldMedia Festival, Hamburg
- Nominated for Best Documentary, BAFTA (British Oscar) Awards
- Honorable Mention, Society for Visual Anthropology Film Festival
- Vermont International Film Festival
- Bellingham Human Rights Film Festival
- Freedom Cinema Festival
- Istanbul International Labor Film Festival
