= Year Zero: The Silent Death of Cambodia =

- Written by: John Pilger
- Directed by: David Munro
- Narrated by: John Pilger
- Country of origin: United Kingdom
- Original language: English

Production
- Producer: David Munro
- Cinematography: Eric Piper

Original release
- Network: ITV
- Release: 1979

Year Zero: The Silent Death of Cambodia is a 1979 British television documentary film written and presented by the Australian journalist John Pilger, which was produced and directed by David Munro for the ITV network by Associated Television (ATV). First broadcast on 30 October 1979, the filmmakers had entered Cambodia in the wake of the overthrow of the Pol Pot regime.

The film recounts the bombing of Cambodia by the United States in the 1970s, a chapter of the Vietnam War kept secret from the American population, the subsequent brutality and Cambodian genocide perpetrated by Pol Pot and his Khmer Rouge militia after their take over of the country, the poverty and suffering of the people, and the limited aid since given by the West. Pilger's first report on Cambodia was published in a special issue of the Daily Mirror.

Following the programme, some £45 million (equivalent to £222 million in 2025) was raised, unsolicited, in mostly small donations, including almost £4 million raised by schoolchildren in the UK. This funded the first substantial relief for Cambodia, including the shipment of life-saving medicines such as penicillin, and clothing to replace the black uniforms people had been forced to wear. According to Brian Walker, director of Oxfam, "a solidarity and compassion surged across our nation" from the broadcast of Year Zero.

== Responses by William Shawcross and others ==
William Shawcross wrote in his book The Quality of Mercy: Cambodia, Holocaust and Modern Conscience (1984) about Pilger's series of articles about Cambodia in the Daily Mirror during August 1979:

A rather interesting quality of the articles was their concentration on Nazism and the holocaust. Pilger called Pol Pot 'an Asian Hitler' — and said he was even worse than Hitler ... Again and again Pilger compared the Khmer Rouge to the Nazis...Their Marxist-Leninist ideology was not even mentioned in the Mirror, except to say they were inspired by the Red Guards.

Ben Kiernan, in his review of Shawcross's book, notes that Pilger compared Pol Pot's Khmer Rouge to Stalin's terror, as well as to Mao's Red Guards. Kiernan notes instances where other writers' comparisons of Pol Pot to Hitler or the Vietnamese to the Nazis are either accepted by Shawcross in his account, or not mentioned.

=== Later comments ===
In 2006, Pilger described the British reaction to Year Zero:

The documentary as a television "event" can send ripples far and wide ... Year Zero not only revealed the horror of the Pol Pot years, it showed how Richard Nixon's and Henry Kissinger's 'secret' bombing of that country had provided a critical catalyst for the rise of the Khmer Rouge. It also exposed how the West, led by the United States and Britain, was imposing an embargo, like a medieval siege, on the most stricken country on earth. This was a reaction to the fact that Cambodia's liberator was Vietnam – a country that had come from the wrong side of the Cold War and that had recently defeated the US. Cambodia's suffering was a wilful revenge. Britain and the US even backed Pol Pot's demand that his man continue to occupy Cambodia's seat at the UN, while Margaret Thatcher stopped children's milk going to the survivors of his nightmare regime. Little of this was reported. Had Year Zero simply described the monster that Pol Pot was, it would have been quickly forgotten. By reporting the collusion of "our" governments, it told a wider truth about how the world was run ... Within two days of Year Zero going to air, 40 sacks of post arrived at ATV ... in Birmingham – 26,000 first-class letters in the first post alone. The station quickly amassed £1m, almost all of it in small amounts. "This is for Cambodia," wrote a Bristol bus driver, enclosing his week's wage. Entire pensions were sent, along with entire savings. Petitions arrived at Downing Street, one after the other, for weeks. MPs received hundreds of thousands of letters, demanding that British policy change (which it did, eventually). And none of it was asked for. For me, the public response to Year Zero gave the lie to clichés about "compassion fatigue", an excuse that some broadcasters and television executives use to justify the current descent into the cynicism and passivity of Big Brotherland. Above all, I learned that a documentary could reclaim shared historical and political memories, and present their hidden truths. The reward then was a compassionate and an informed public; and it still is.

In a 2007 speech, "Freedom Next Time: Resisting the Empire", Pilger described his experience with executives of the American Public Broadcasting Service (PBS). They refused to screen Year Zero, which, according to Pilger, has never been broadcast in the United States.

The documentary has been released on DVD as part of Network's ITV 60 compilation box set as well as sets under Pilger's own name.

== See also ==
- Year Zero (political notion)
