= Stealing a Nation =

- Title card
- Written by: John Pilger
- Directed by: John Pilger; Christopher Martin; Sean Crotty
- Starring: John Pilger; James R. Schlesinger; Cassam Uteem; Bill Rammell; Mark Curtis; Louis Olivier Bancoult
- Music by: Nicholas Russell-Pavier
- Country of origin: United Kingdom
- Original languages: English; Chagossian Creole; Mauritian Creole

Production
- Producers: Christopher Martin; Polly Bide
- Cinematography: Preston Clothier
- Editor: Joe Frost
- Running time: 56 minutes
- Production company: Carlton Television

Original release
- Release: 2004

Stealing a Nation is a 2004 Granada Television documentary about the British–American clandestine operation that saw the expulsion of the Chagossian population who have lived on Diego Garcia and neighbouring islands since the late 18th century. More than 2,000 people were forcefully relocated to Mauritius between 1967 and 1973, so that Diego Garcia could become a United States military airbase. The film contains a series of interviews with Chagossians, who have been deprived of their right of return and forced to live in abject poverty. Stealing a Nation was written and directed by Australian journalist John Pilger, and produced and directed by Christopher Martin; reconstruction footage was directed by Sean Crotty.

== Reception, awards and festival screenings ==
Stealing a Nation was awarded the 2004 Royal Television Society Award in the category "Single Documentary - General".

The film was screened at the United Nations Association Film Festival in October 2005.

It was given the Chris Award in the Social Issues category at the Columbus International Film & Video Festival in November 2005.
