= Orlando (TV series) =

British TV thriller series (1965–1968)

- Genre: Thriller (children's adventure)
- Directed by: Ronald Marriott, Hugh Munro, Adrian Cooper
- Starring: Sam Kydd; Gregory Phillips; Margo Andrew; David Munro; Judy Robinson; Arthur White
- Opening theme: "The Hellraisers" by Syd Dale
- Country of origin: United Kingdom
- Original language: English
- No. of seasons: 4
- No. of episodes: 76 (72 missing)

Production
- Producer: Ronald Marriott
- Running time: 30 minutes
- Production company: Associated-Rediffusion

Original release
- Network: ITV
- Release: 13 April 1965 – 14 June 1968

Related
- Crane (TV series)

Orlando is a British television thriller series for young adults which ran for four series between 1965 and 1968. Made by Associated-Rediffusion for the ITV network, it stars Sam Kydd as Orlando O'Connor, the character he had played in the adult television series Crane.

Only four episodes out of the 76 made are known to still exist; the remainder are lost. It introduced an evocative theme tune "The Hellraisers" by Syd Dale, which became a commonplace adventure underscore cue as library music for other productions worldwide.

== Cast ==
Character	Actor	Series
Orlando O'Connor	Sam Kydd	1-4
Long John Turner	Gregory Phillips	1
Triss Fenton	Margo Andrew	1
Steve Morgan	David Munro	2-3
Jenn Morgan	Judy Robinson	2-3
Shish Kebab	Arthur White	4

== Plot ==
Orlando O'Connor is an ex-Foreign Legionnaire who has picked up a magic talisman, the "Gizzmo". His boat building firm fails and he travels to London's Docklands to meet an old Navy comrade Tony, looking for work, only to find Tony has been killed. He links up with David and Jenny who have inherited a detective agency from their Uncle. They set out to solve Tony's murder. After that they run the detective agency together.

== Episodes ==
=== Series 1 (1965) ===
No. overall	No. in series	Title	Original release date	Archive Status
1	1	"The Silver Spoon"	13 April 1965	Missing
2	2	"Orlando Tells a Story"	20 April 1965	Missing
3	3	"A Ring of Dogs"	27 April 1965	Missing
4	4	"Humpty-Dumpty"	4 May 1965	Missing
5	5	"Mask of Fear"	11 May 1965	Missing
6	6	"The Black Snake"	18 May 1965	Missing
7	7	"Ding-Dong Bell"	25 May 1965	Missing
8	8	"Flight to Calais"	1 June 1965	Missing
9	9	"A Load of Bilge Water"	8 June 1965	Missing
10	10	"The New People"	15 June 1965	Missing
11	11	"Skinny"	22 June 1965	Missing
12	12	"A Code for Life"	29 June 1965	Missing
13	13	"The Gold-Plated Football"	6 July 1965	Missing

=== Series 2 (1966-1967) ===
No. overall	No. in series	Title	Original release date	Archive Status
14	1	"A Slight Case of Pilfering: A Packet Full of Trouble"	5 April 1966	Missing
15	2	"A Slight Case of Pilfering: A Man Called Burton"	12 April 1966	Missing
16	3	"A Slight Case of Pilfering: The Achilles Heel"	19 April 1966	Missing
17	4	"A Slight Case of Pilfering: Check"	26 April 1966	Missing
18	5	"A Slight Case of Pilfering: The Cookie Begins to Crumble"	10 May 1966	Missing
19	6	"A Slight Case of Pilfering: Rainbow Day"	17 May 1966	Missing
20	7	"A Slight Case of Pilfering: Follow the Leader"	24 May 1966	Missing
21	8	"Orlando and the Cemetery Walkers: The Cemetery Walkers"	31 May 1966	Missing
22	9	"Orlando and the Cemetery Walkers: A Body in the Basin"	7 June 1966	Missing
23	10	"Orlando and the Cemetery Walkers: The Plot Thickens"	14 June 1966	Missing
24	11	"Orlando and the Cemetery Walkers: Maiden Voyage"	21 June 1966	Missing
25	12	"Orlando and the Cemetery Walkers: Break Out"	28 June 1966	Missing
26	13	"Orlando and the Cemetery Walkers: The Tables Turned"	5 July 1966	Missing
27	14	"Orlando and the Gizzmo's Revenge: High Jinks and Old Junk"	12 July 1966	Missing
28	15	"Orlando and the Gizzmo's Revenge: Royalty Moves In"	19 July 1966	Missing
29	16	"Orlando and the Gizzmo's Revenge: Lady in Waiting"	26 July 1966	Missing
30	17	"Orlando and the Gizzmo's Revenge: Corpse Diplomatic"	2 August 1966	Missing
31	18	"Orlando and the Gizzmo's Revenge: Sink or Swim"	9 August 1966	Missing
32	19	"Now You See It - Now You Don't: That Was No Lady - That Was the Man from M.I.N.C.E."	16 August 1966	Missing
33	20	"Now You See It - Now You Don't: Shuffle the Pack and up Pops the Joker"	23 August 1966	Missing
34	21	"Now You See It - Now You Don't: A Funny Thing Happened to Me on My Way to Prison"	30 August 1966	Missing
35	22	"Now You See It - Now You Don't: And for My Next Trick"	6 September 1966	Missing
36	23	"Now You See It - Now You Don't: The Spies That Went Into the Cold"	13 September 1966	Missing
37	24	"Now You See It - Now You Don't: It's Bursting at the Seams"	20 September 1966	Missing
38	25	"Dangerous Waters: Orlando and the Dangerous Waters"	27 September 1966	Exists
39	26	"Dangerous Waters: Skin Deep"	4 October 1966	Exists
40	27	"Dangerous Waters: Rhyme - But No Reason"	11 October 1966	Exists
41	28	"Dangerous Waters: Victory in Sight"	18 October 1966	Exists
42	29	"Dangerous Waters: Find the Lady"	25 October 1966	Missing
43	30	"Dangerous Waters: All in the Book"	1 November 1966	Missing
44	31	"Orlando and a Man Called Moosh: Has Anyone Seen Fred Kebab?"	8 November 1966	Missing
45	32	"Orlando and a Man Called Moosh: Come with Me to the Casbah"	15 November 1966	Missing
46	33	"Orlando and a Man Called Moosh: A Man Called Moosh"	22 November 1966	Missing
47	34	"Orlando and a Man Called Moosh: Only a Camel Loves a Camel"	29 November 1966	Missing
48	35	"Orlando and a Man Called Moosh: Hubble, Bubble, Double Trouble"	6 December 1966	Missing
49	36	"Stealers Keepers: Storm Warning"	13 December 1966	Missing
50	37	"Stealers Keepers: Wake up Screaming"	20 December 1966	Missing
51	38	"Stealers Keepers: A Peeping Tom and a Shoe"	27 December 1966	Missing
52	39	"Stealers Keepers: Assassin Airborne"	3 January 1967	Missing
53	40	"Stealers Keepers: In at the Death"	10 January 1967	Missing

=== Series 3 (1967) ===
No. overall	No. in series	Title	Original release date	Archive Status
54	1	"Orlando and the Frightened Clown: Beginners Please"	17 January 1967	Missing
55	2	"Orlando and the Frightened Clown: The Show Must Go On"	24 January 1967	Missing
56	3	"Orlando and the Frightened Clown: Clown on a Bike"	31 January 1967	Missing
57	4	"Orlando and the Frightened Clown: An Apple a Day…"	7 February 1967	Missing
58	5	"Orlando and the Frightened Clown: Send for Fred Pinwad"	14 February 1967	Missing
59	6	"Orlando and the Frightened Clown: Curtain Up"	21 February 1967	Missing
60	7	"Orlando and the Irish Stew: A Tune in the Night"	28 February 1967	Missing
61	8	"Orlando and the Irish Stew: The Stew Thickens"	7 March 1967	Missing
62	9	"Orlando and the Irish Stew: Masks Over Masks"	14 March 1967	Missing
63	10	"Orlando and the Irish Stew: A Bit of a Dance"	21 March 1967	Missing
64	11	"Orlando and the Irish Stew: Pincer Movements"	27 March 1967	Missing

=== Series 4 (1968) ===
No. overall	No. in series	Title	Original release date	Archive Status
65	1	"Orlando and the Return of Moosh: Beau Geste and All That"	25 March 1968	Missing
66	2	"Orlando and the Return of Moosh: When Did You Last See Your Father?"	1 April 1968	Missing
67	3	"Orlando and the Return of Moosh: Don't Look Now, There's a Djellebah Behind You"	8 April 1968	Missing
68	4	"Orlando and the Return of Moosh: Where Was Moosh When the Lights Went Out?"	15 April 1968	Missing
69	5	"Orlando and the Up the Jungle Affair: Lady Tapwater Turns It On"	26 April 1968	Missing
70	6	"Orlando and the Up the Jungle Affair: Who's Afraid of Piranha Fish?"	3 May 1968	Missing
71	7	"Orlando and the Up the Jungle Affair: Me Tarzan - Up a Gum Tree"	10 May 1968	Missing
72	8	"Orlando and the Up the Jungle Affair: Let's All Be Hairy Together"	17 May 1968	Missing
73	9	"Orlando and the Fifi Affair: Ou est Fifi Le Bon Bon?"	24 May 1968	Missing
74	10	"Orlando and the Fifi Affair: Aimez-Vous Serge Trowzerzoff?"	30 May 1968	Missing
75	11	"Orlando and the Fifi Affair: Comment Allez Are You Up?"	7 June 1968	Missing
76	12	"Orlando and the Fifi Affair: Au Revoir but Not Goodbye"	14 June 1968	Missing

== Comic Strip ==
TV Comic ran both comic strips and text stories based on the series for several years, beginning from issue 754 (cover-dated “Week Ending 28th May, 1966”.
