= Zoe Pilger =

English author and art critic

- Born: 1984 (age 41–42); London, England
- Relatives: John Pilger (father); Yvonne Roberts (mother)
- Writing career
- Notable work: Eat My Heart Out

Zoe Pilger (/ˈpɪldʒər/; born 1984) is an English author and art critic. Her first novel, Eat My Heart Out, won a Betty Trask Award and a Somerset Maugham Award.

== Early life and career ==
The daughter of journalists John Pilger and Yvonne Roberts, Zoe Pilger studied social and political science at Cambridge University. She also gained an MA in Comparative Literature from Goldsmiths, University of London.

Pilger was art critic of The Independent, a British newspaper, from January 2012 to 2016. Her first novel, Eat My Heart Out, published by Serpent's Tail in 2014, has been described as a post-feminist satire about modern romance. It developed from an intensive writing period when the author was 23 and lived in an unfamiliar seaside town for six-months.

Pilger lives in London.

== Awards and nominations ==
- 2011 - Frieze Writer's Prize
- 2014 - Shortlisted for the Observer/Anthony Burgess Prize for journalism in art.
- 2015 - Somerset Maugham Award for Eat My Heart Out
- 2015 - Betty Trask Award for Eat My Heart Out
- 2016 - Shortlisted for a Lambda Literary Award for Bisexual Literature for Eat My Heart Out
