= Palestine Is Still the Issue =

- Screenshot
- Written by: John Pilger
- Directed by: Tony Stark
- Starring: John Pilger; Mustafa Barghouthi; Ilan Pappe
- Narrated by: John Pilger
- Music by: Mitch Dalton
- Original language: English

Production
- Producers: Christopher Martin; Polly Bide
- Cinematography: Preston Clothier
- Running time: 53 min
- Production company: Carlton Television

Original release
- Network: Carlton Television
- Release: 2002

Related
- Palestine is Still the Issue (1974)

Palestine Is Still the Issue is a 2002 Carlton Television documentary, written and presented by John Pilger and directed by Tony Stark, inspired by the book Drinking The Sea at Gaza by Amira Hass. Pilger visits the Middle East and tries to discover why peace is elusive.

== Synopsis ==
Pilger returns to the Occupied Territories of the West Bank and Gaza, where he filmed a documentary with the same title in 1977. He believes the basic problems are unchanged: a desperate, destitute people whose homeland is illegally occupied by the world's 19th-largest military power. The majority of the film is dedicated to interviewing Israelis, some of them settlers or advisers for the government; others are Israelis who are critical towards the politics of their government. However, the film also takes time to speak with many Palestinians, and goes into depth to explain to Western audiences why the Palestinians feel that they have to keep resisting the occupation of their territories and fight back against the blockade of the Gaza Strip.

== Interviewees ==
- Dr. Mustafa Barghouthi – Union of Palestinian Medical Relief Committees
- Professor Ilan Pappe – Israeli Historian
- Liana Badr – Director, Palestinian Ministry of Culture
- Dori Gold – Senior Adviser to the Israeli Prime Minister
- Moshe Dann – Israeli writer
- Dr. Khaled Dahlan – Gaza Community Health Project
- Dr. Mona Al Farra – Palestinian doctor
- Ishay Rosen-Zvi – former Israeli soldier
- Lama Hourani – Palestinian resident, Gaza
- Amjad Abu Laban – Palestinian resident, Bethlehem
- David Reisch – Israeli settler
- Rami Elhanan -– Israeli peace activist
- Fatima Abed-Rabo
- Khalil Idris

== Reception ==
The film was criticised by Michael Green, chairman of Carlton Communications, the company which made the film, as being inaccurate and biased. The next day, under the headline 'Carlton rebukes own chairman for attacking documentary', The Independent published a statement by Carlton's Director of Factual Programmes, Richard Clemmow, and Executive Producer Polly Bide. "Carlton stands by John Pilger's programme and its accuracy" it read. "The film went through the normal channels of editorial scrutiny prior to completion and senior executives at both Carlton and the ITV Network Centre approved its transmission. Michael Green's opinion is his own. He had no involvement in the programme or its transmission. The film sought to give a voice to people in the Palestinian and Israeli communities who are seldom heard".

== Awards and festival screenings ==
- The Chris Award, Columbus International Film & Video Festival
- Best of Category, Vermont International Film Festival
- Certificate of Merit, Chicago International Television Awards
- Mountaintop Film Festival, Vermont
- Istanbul International Labor Film Festival
