= Paying the Price: Killing the Children of Iraq =

- Screenshot of title card
- Written by: John Pilger
- Directed by: Alan Lowery
- Starring: John Pilger; Dennis Halliday; Robert Gates; Hans von Sponeck; Peter van Walsum; Karol Sikora; James Rubin; Scott Ritter; Said Aburish; Doug Rokke
- Music by: Nick Russell-Pavier
- Country of origin: United Kingdom
- Original language: English

Production
- Producers: John Pilger; Alan Lowery
- Cinematography: Preston Clothier
- Editor: Joe Frost
- Running time: 74 minutes
- Production company: Carlton Television

Original release
- Release: 2000

Paying the Price: Killing the Children of Iraq is a 2000 Carlton Television documentary written and presented by John Pilger which was directed by Alan Lowery. In this documentary Pilger argues that UN sanctions had a devastating effect on the children of Iraq during the 1990s.

== Synopsis ==
John Pilger and Alan Lowery traveled to Iraq with Denis Halliday, a former assistant secretary-general of the United Nations who resigned over what he called the "immoral policy" of economic sanctions. There they expected to find a suffering nation held hostage to the compliance of a dictator, Saddam Hussein. What they found was a country being slowly strangled by a draconian U.S./U.K. blockade.

== Interviewees ==
- Dennis Halliday – Former Asst. Secretary General, United Nations
- Robert Gates – CIA Director 1991-93
- Hans von Sponeck – Chief UN co-ordinator, Iraq
- Ambassador Peter van Walsum – Chairman, UN Sanctions Committee
- Professor Karol Sikora – Former Chief of Cancer Programme, World Health Organization
- James Rubin – US State Department spokesman
- Scott Ritter – UN Weapons Inspector 1991-1998
- Said Aburish – Author, Saddam Hussein: The Politics of Revenge
- Mohammed Amin Ezzet – Conductor, Iraqi National Orchestra
- Anupama Rao Singh – UNICEF Representative, Iraq
- Professor Doug Rokke – Former US Army health physicist
- Dr. Jinan Ghalib Hassen – Paediatrician
- Dr. Jawad Al-Ali – Cancer specialist
- Laith Kubba – Iraqi opposition exile
- Felicity Arbuthnot – Journalist
- Hussain Jarsis – Shepherd

== Awards and festival screenings ==
- Chris Award, Columbus International Film & Video Festival
- Vancouver International Film Festival
