= The War on Democracy =

- Directed by: Christopher Martin; John Pilger
- Written by: John Pilger
- Produced by: Wayne Young
- Production companies: Youngheart Entertainment; Granada Productions
- Distributed by: Lions Gate
- Release date: 15 June 2007 (United Kingdom)
- Running time: 96 min.
- Language: English

The War on Democracy is a 2007 documentary film directed by Christopher Martin and John Pilger, who also wrote the narration. Focusing on the political situations in nations of Latin America, the film criticises both the United States' intervention in foreign countries' domestic politics and its "war on terrorism". The film was first released in the United Kingdom on 15 June 2007.

== Production ==
The film was produced over a two-year period. Carl Deal, chief archivist on the Michael Moore films Fahrenheit 9/11 and Bowling for Columbine, provided the archive footage used in the film. It is mastered in high-definition video.

== Marketing ==
The graphic designer, Andrew Howard had submitted a text-only design for the film's posters which were rejected as Lionsgate did not feel they were right.

== Distribution ==
The War on Democracy was screened at both the 2007 Cannes Film Festival and the Galway Film Festival. The film was sold to distributors Lionsgate for distribution in the UK and Hopscotch distribution in Australia and New Zealand. Pre-release screening took place at two Fopp locations on 12 June 2007, including one that was followed by a question and answer session with co-director John Pilger.

== Reception ==
On review aggregator Rotten Tomatoes, 77% of 13 critic reviews are positive.

Peter Bradshaw wrote in The Guardian that "[Pilger] recounts the shabby tale of how the postwar United States set about... [removing] inconvenient nationalisers in small countries" and criticised his approach to Hugo Chavez saying "Maybe he thinks that questioning Chávez on this point would be playing into the hands of the smearmongers. Maybe. But he's in dereliction of his journalistic duty, just the same... But however posterity depicts [Chavez], the truth of Pilger's overall story is plain enough.

Kat Brown in Empire gave the film four out of five stars writing that it is "a brilliantly-researched and sometimes shocking insight into the democratic position of those countries whose dealings with America are more along the lines of slave than political poodle".

Andrew Billen wrote in The Times: "By any standards his latest outing was an impressive polemic, but by any standards, too, Pilger's patsy questioning of President Chávez was a disgrace".

James Walton in The Daily Telegraph thought that while "Pilger stressed that Venezuela's potential utopia is under threat", he "made exactly the same claims for Chavez that he was making for the Sandinistas in Nicaragua" in the 1980s. In Pilger's account of US involvement in Latin America, Walton wrote, "while this was the most familiar section of the programme, it was also the most powerful and persuasive – because, once he was attacking his baddies, Pilger duly seemed on more solid ground. His recital, pretty polished by now, included chapter and verse on American involvement in torture, massacres and terrorism. He exposed (again) 'the epic lie' that this was done for the sake of democracy".

The War on Democracy won the One World Media TV Documentary Award in 2008.

== Box office ==
The War on Democracy grossed $199,500 at the box office in Australia.

== See also ==
- The Revolution Will Not Be Televised, documentary filmed from within the Chavez camp during the failed coup of 2002.
- South of the Border, documentary by Oliver Stone
