= The Listening Post =

Current affairs TV programme with a focus on media analysis

- Title card
- Created by: Al Jazeera English
- Presented by: Richard Gizbert
- Country of origin: United Kingdom
- No. of episodes: 359

Production
- Executive producer: Meenakshi Ravi
- Production location: London
- Running time: 30 minutes

Original release
- Network: Al Jazeera English, Al Jazeera America
- Release: November 2006 – present

The Listening Post is a current affairs programme with a focus on media analysis and critique. It broadcasts on Al Jazeera English, and is filmed and produced from AJE's hub in London at the Shard.

== History ==
The Listening Post is one of the longest-running programmes on Al Jazeera English, launched in 2006. It is a weekly broadcast that analyses current affairs by examining the ways in which stories, issues and events are reported in the media.

The show's specialism is media analysis and critique and the global breadth of its coverage – with reports ranging from Rupert Murdoch's hold on media in Australia, the war of media narratives between Russia and the West to the rise of anti-Muslim rhetoric in India.

The show's presenter is Richard Gizbert. Gizbert, a veteran of ABC News. Gizbert conceptualised and pitched the show to the network and was recruited in April 2006, in the run-up to the channel's launch. Stand-in hosts in Gizbert's absence have been former Al Jazeera news anchor Barbara Serra and the show's executive producer Meenakshi Ravi.

== Format ==
The aim of the show is to look at the global media industry - spanning journalism to popular culture – with a critical, analytical eye. "The Listening Post aims to monitor virtually all forms of media, from networks to bloggers, and report on what they do or do not cover." The show is broken into four main segments. Each episode presents:

- Two in-depth reports –one in each half of the show: The "Lead" takes a key story of the week and dissects the media angles around it. This could be a significant media moment, analysis of the media landscape and how the ownership or control of media outlets affects the coverage, the impact of social media, etc. The "Feature" focuses on trends in the media, stories not necessarily in the headlines but with interesting media components, etc.
- Radar: This segment used to be called "News Bites" when the show started. It is a short segment separating the two main reports and looks at another media story or event of the week.
- Endnote: This is the closing segment of the show and showcases short videos of satire, commentary or even clips of state run media output that capture the absurdity of how media can be used by power. Sometimes this segment can feature recommendations of places where viewers can find information on certain topics or stories.

The show breaks format a few times a year to present full episodes on specific topics. Previous special episodes have marked a decade since the Arab Spring, and twenty years since 9/11. There have also been special episodes on the challenges facing the BBC, and the expanding Israeli surveillance

== Analytical style ==
The Listening Post's style is fast-paced and context rich.

The show's journalists take the initiative and responsibility for the analysis. Other broadcasters can seem to step back from responsibility by hosting interviews: this provides many assertions, but little analysis.

The Listening Post differs in that it tends to back up its arguments by evidence of actual media output. These examples illustrate how the press can often be conformist and subservient to those in power. In addition, the show has discussed a recurring journalistic tendency to regurgitate convenient "factual" detail, without checking either the source of the material - and a possible agenda in offering it - or the methodologies, which can frequently be unscientific and specious.

== Critique ==
Aaron Barnhart of The Kansas City Star said that The Listening Post "might be the best media-critique program in English anywhere".

"So the next time you watch hungry Somalians on TV you might in a perverse way be pushing Africa into China's arms. That is the power of media. If it wasn't for the Listening Post, we'd never have never known that." – Aastha Manocha, newslaundry

== Awards ==
Award	Year	Category	Episode
The Telly Awards	2023	Bronze Winner - Travel/Tourism - Television	The Listening Post - The Listening Post - Destination Damascus
Foreign Press Association Awards	2022	Travel/Tourism Story of the Year	The Listening Post - Destination Damascus
Foreign Press Association Awards	2021	Arts & Culture Story of the Year	The Listening Post- Battle for the BBC
Promax BDA Awards	2015	Gold Award - Art direction and design: news program promotion package	

== Selected episodes ==
The shows most popular episodes have covered a wide range of geographies, often bringing global focus to underrepresented media stories. Some of the popular episodes and segments are:

- "Why did Pakistan’s Geo TV go dark", 16 April 2018
- "Noam Chomsky's Manufacturing Consent revisited", 22 December 2018
- "The media backstory behind Malaysia's 1MDB corruption case", 18 April 2019
- "China: Covering the Coronavirus Contagion", 1 February 2020
- "How Turkish TV's Ottoman phenomenon Ertuğrul went global", 29 June 2020
- "Why Russian media is turning on its military", 8 October 2022
- "Why Youtube is blowing up in India", 4 July 2023
