= Welcome to Australia =

- Title card
- Written by: John Pilger
- Directed by: Alan Lowery
- Starring: John Pilger
- Music by: Dominic Murcott; James Ambler
- Country of origin: United Kingdom
- Original language: English

Production
- Producers: John Pilger; Alan Lowery
- Cinematography: Preston Clothier
- Editor: Andrew Denny
- Running time: 50 minutes
- Production company: Carlton Television

Original release
- Release: 1999

Welcome to Australia is a 1999 Carlton Television documentary, written and presented by John Pilger and directed and produced by Alan Lowery that demonstrates the injustices endured by Aboriginal Australian sportsmen and women who were, until recently, denied a place on Australia's olympic teams.

== Synopsis ==
In the build-up to the Sydney 2000 Summer Olympics, Pilger finds that the elaborate preparations for the Olympics are overshadowing the reality of many Australia's Aborigines, who he argues continue to remain excluded, impoverished and mistreated in Australia. The film uses sport as a mechanism to draw attention to and tell the story of the injustices endured by Aboriginal Australians while also arguing that Aboriginal Australians could have had a much more significant impact on Australian sport if they had not been deliberately prevented from doing so.

The documentary mentions the official recognition of the stolen generations with the release of the Human Rights Commission report Bringing Them Home. It reports on the ongoing prevalence of the eye disease trachoma within the Aboriginal community and the fact that Aboriginal life expectancy is 25 years less than for whites. Pilger says: "Civilisations are judged by how they treat all their people, especially the most vulnerable, who are often the bravest... Why is it not possible for a nation’s leaders to behave honourably towards less than 2 per cent of the population?"

== Production ==
Much of the information presented in Welcome to Australia comes from a book called 'Obstacle Race: Aborigines in Sport', written in 1995 by Colin Tatz. His view of Australia's treatment of Aboriginal athletes and the impoverished conditions faced by many Aboriginal Australians in 1999 lead Tatz to declare that Australia was not worthy of hosting the 2000 Olympics. Tatz argues that if China had made an issue of Australia's human rights record in the way in which Australia chose to make China's human rights an issue, it is unlikely that Australia would have been selected to host the games.

== Reviews ==
"Whatever one may think of Pilger's style," stated Richard Ackland of ABC's Media Watch, "his film reminded us of a shameful and tragic history".

== Awards ==
| Ceremony | Category | Year | Result |
|---|---|---|---|
| New York Festivals TV Programming & Promotion Competition | National/International Affairs | 1999 | Won |
| WorldFest - Flagstaff | Television Documentary & Information Programme: Political/International Issues | 2000 | Won |
