= Hans-Christof von Sponeck =

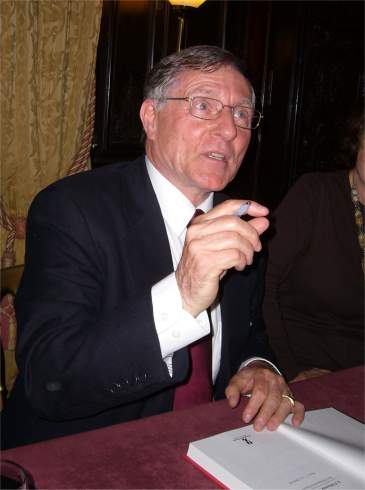
Hans-Christof von Sponeck

Hans-Christof Graf von Sponeck is a German diplomat. He served as a UN Assistant Secretary-General and UN Humanitarian Coordinator for Iraq.

== Life ==
Hans-Christof von Sponeck was born in Bremen, Germany. His father, Hans Graf von Sponeck, was a general of the Wehrmacht in World War II and was executed on 23 July 1944 in the aftermath of the 20 July plot.

In 1957, Sponeck was one of the first conscientious objectors in the Federal Republic of Germany.

Sponeck studied history, demography, and physical anthropology in Germany and the United States and joined the UN Development Programme in 1968, working in Pakistan and elsewhere. In 1988, he was admitted to the Order of Saint John (Bailiwick of Brandenburg), the Protestant chivalric order to which his father, too, had belonged.

After Denis Halliday resigned as UN Humanitarian Coordinator for Iraq in October 1998, Sponeck took over, heading all UN operations in Iraq and managing the Iraqi operations of the Oil-for-Food Programme. In February 2000, Sponeck and Jutta Burghardt, head of the UN World Food Programme in Iraq, both resigned for the same reason as Halliday, to protest against the Iraq sanctions policy of the UN. Sponeck and Halliday wrote an article for The Guardian explaining their position, accusing the sanctions regime of violating the Geneva Conventions and other international laws and causing the death of thousands of Iraqis.

He was equally critical of the "smart sanctions" policy several years later: "What is proposed at this point in fact amounts to a tightening of the rope around the neck of the average Iraqi citizen. The so-called 'new' sanction policy maintains the old bridgeheads of the current sanction regime: the oil escrow account remains with the UN, market-based foreign investment in Iraq will not be allowed and an oil-for-food program stays in the hands of the UN."

In June 2005, he served as an expert on the World Tribunal on Iraq, convened in the spirit of the Russell Tribunal.

His earlier work as a resident representative in Pakistan and elsewhere, led to him becoming, like Halliday, a highly respected figure within the UN. After his resignation, he sought funds for his anti-sanctions work from firms seeking to do business with Iraq. His actions came under some scrutiny from the Paul Volcker Committee, which held that he had not broken any rule, but recommended tightening the rules.

Sponeck was awarded the 2000 Coventry Peace Prize by Coventry Cathedral and the City of Coventry, the 2000 Humanitarian Award from the American-Arab Anti-Discrimination Committee and the 2003 Bremen Peace Award of the Threshold Foundation. He is a member of the World Future Council.

== Works ==
- Human Development - Is There An Alternative?, New Delhi, November 1997
- Hans C. von Sponeck (2006). A Different Kind of War: The UN Sanctions Regime in Iraq. New York, Oxford: Berghahn Books. ISBN 1-84545-222-4. Foreword by Celso Amorim; first published 2005 in Germany as Ein Anderer Krieg: Das Sanktionsregime der UNO im Irak.
- Hans C. von Sponeck; Andreas Zumach (2003). Irak: Chronik Eines Gewollten Krieges: Wie Die Weltoffentlichkeit Manipuliert Und Das Volkerrecht Gebrochen Wird (Kiwi). Kiepenheuer & Witsch GmbH & Co. KG, Verlag. ISBN 3-462-03255-0.
- Rüdiger Göbel, ed. (2003). Bomben auf Bagdad: nicht in unserem Namen. Kai Homilius. ISBN 3-462-03255-0.
