= Richard Gizbert =

Canadian journalist

Richard Gizbert is a Canadian broadcast journalist. He is the creator and presenter of the Listening Post on Al Jazeera English.

Gizbert was formerly employed by ABC News but was terminated for refusing to travel to Iraq to cover the 2003 U.S. invasion. He later won a case for unfair dismissal against the network.

He is one of six children of transport economist Konrad Studnicki-Gizbert and the grandson of Wladyslaw Studnicki, a Polish politician and publicist with roots in the Polish nobility, the szlachta.

His half-brother, Christopher, is an MIT-trained geologist currently living and working in Calgary, Alberta. Another half-brother, Daviken, is an associate professor of history, specializing in Latin America, at McGill University in Montreal.

== Career ==
=== Early career ===
Prior to joining ABC News, Gizbert worked as a correspondent-producer for CJOH-TV in Ottawa, where he produced in-depth features for Sunday Edition, the national current affairs programme. Prior to that, Gizbert was CJOH's parliamentary correspondent for five years, responsible for national political coverage. For his reporting of a hostage situation on Parliament Hill, Gizbert received the National Award for Breaking News Coverage.

From 1983 to 1985, Gizbert was a parliamentary correspondent and political editor for CFTO-TV in Toronto, covering federal politics and co-presenting special events coverage.

Early articles include a review for Ottawa-based radio station CKCU on Elvis Costello's performance at the Heatwave Festival in 1980.

=== ABC News ===
After being fired by ABC News in 2004, Gizbert fought and won a wrongful dismissal case against the network, in which an employment tribunal awarded him $100,000 in compensation. In his legal claim, Gizbert argued that his refusal to accept assignments in Iraq led to his firing. The tribunal agreed, ruling Gizbert's stand on assignments in Iraq was a "primary" reason for his dismissal.

Prior to the case, Gizbert had done extensive work in war zones for ABC. Starting in 1993, he covered the former Yugoslavia, Chechnya, Rwanda and Somalia. In 1999, he says, he told ABC that, as a parent of young children he felt he could no longer accept assignments in war zones. Gizbert told the tribunal that he offered to accept a domestic assignment in the US, if ABC wished him to do so. He said the network decided to keep him in London.

Five years later he was fired by ABC and replaced by a correspondent willing to report from war zones.

According to the UK's Guardian newspaper, Gizbert's legal victory "could have far-reaching effects for war-zone journalism". Jeremy Dear, General Secretary of the National Union of Journalists in Britain, said the victory was "hugely important" for journalists and their families.

Martin Bell, former BBC correspondent and former member of UK parliament, testified on Gizbert's behalf at the tribunal. After the verdict he said "Richard has been very brave, beyond war-zone valour, taking on ABC News. He's taken a stand for young journalists."

=== Al Jazeera English ===
External videos
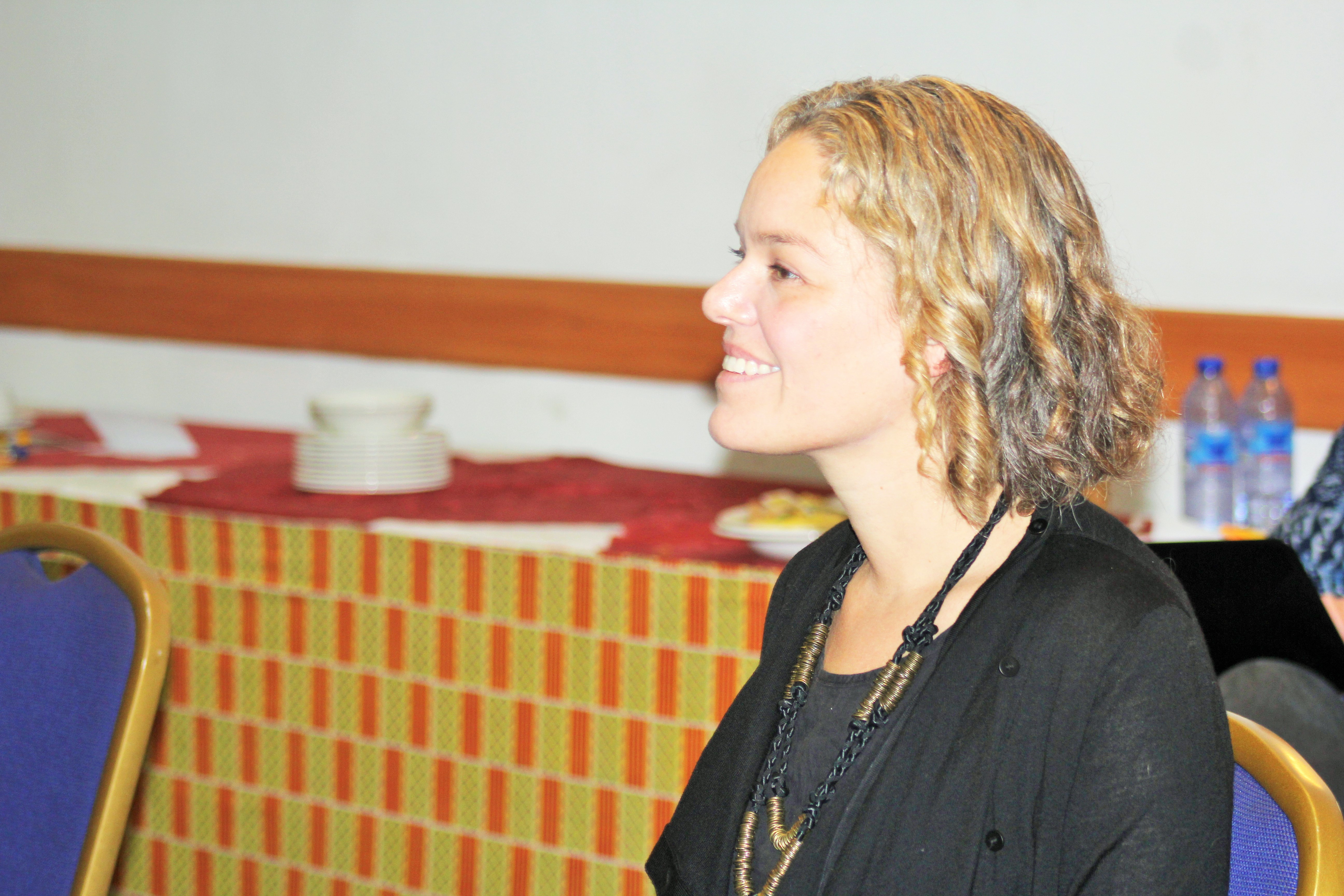
- Wikipedia, open source and the truth, 9:15, The Listening Post, Gizbert interviews Katherine Maher

When his legal case against ABC News (U.S.) concluded, Gizbert joined Al Jazeera English. He pitched a media analysis show to the network The Listening Post and has hosted the weekly programme since the news channel's launch in 2006.

Aaron Barnhart, TV writer for the Kansas City Star, wrote that Listening Post "might be the best media-critique program in English anywhere."

In 2008, Gizbert also created and hosted Playlist, a show dedicated to "musical fusion, music from the global melting pot". He later came up with the idea of 'an interview show without an interviewer, just two guests from different worlds, learning from each other'. Studio B Unscripted debuted on Al Jazeera English in 2019.
