= Nigel Andrews =

British film critic

Nigel Andrews FRSA
- Born: 3 April 1947 (age 79)
- Education: Cambridge University
- Occupation: Film critic
- Employer: Financial Times (1973–2019)
- Awards: British Press Awards Critic of the Year (1985; 2002)

Nigel Andrews FRSA (born 3 April 1947) is a British film critic best known for being the long-time chief film critic of the Financial Times.

Andrews was educated at Lancing College in West Sussex, England. After studying English at Jesus College, Cambridge, Andrews began his career as an editor on the British Film Institute's Cinema One book series and as a critic for its publications Sight & Sound and the Monthly Film Bulletin. He first contributed to the Financial Times on 12 May 1972 and became the regular weekly reviewer from 23 March 1973. He has written books on John Travolta, Arnold Schwarzenegger and the film Jaws (1975). On 20 December 2019, it was announced by the Financial Times that Andrews would step down as their weekly film critic after 46 years in the position.

In 1985 and 2002, Andrews was named Critic of the Year at the British Press Awards. He is a member of the Film Section of The Critics' Circle.

Andrews participated in the 2012 Sight & Sound critics' poll, where he listed his ten favorite films as follows: Aguirre, The Wrath of God, Annie Hall, Citizen Kane, The Godfather: Part II, Hour of the Wolf, Melancholia, Spirited Away, Uncle Boonmee Who Can Recall His Past Lives, Vertigo, and The Wild Bunch.

== Publications ==
- True Myths of Arnold Schwarzenegger: The Life and Times of Arnold Schwarzenegger, from Pumping Iron to Governor of California (1996, rev. 2003)
- Travolta: The Life (1998)
- "Jaws": The Ultimate A–Z (1999)
