= The Secret Country: The First Australians Fight Back =

- Directed by: Alan Lowery
- Written by: John Pilger
- Produced by: Alan Lowery
- Starring: John Pilger
- Release date: 21 May 1985 (UK)
- Running time: 53 minutes
- Country: Australia
- Language: English

The Secret Country: The First Australians Fight Back is a 1985 television documentary made for the British Central Independent Television company by writer/presenter John Pilger and producer/director Alan Lowery. It details the persecution of Aboriginal Australians and Torres Strait Islanders throughout Australia's history.

== Synopsis ==
A summary by the National Library of Australia describes the documentary as:

[Revealing] the often hidden history of Aboriginal Australians from white settlement to the present. The central issue throughout the film is differing perspectives of the land and its uses, providing historical background to the present land rights movement and other areas of Aboriginal activism.

Pilger concludes the documentary by stating that: “It seems to me that, until a committed policy of reconciliation, of real nationhood, is offered to the First Australians, those who came recently can never claim their own.”

== Production ==
The Secret Country was my first film on Indigenous Australia. I look at it these days and what shocks me about it is that virtually nothing has changed. Please keep that in mind as you watch the film. I knew almost nothing about the first people of my own country until I left Australia in my twenties and went to London to work. My London newspaper sent me back to Australia to find out the secret and shocking truth - which is that ‘we’ who are the majority in this country bear the same responsibility as the white minority in apartheid South Africa

— John Pilger

== A Secret Country ==
Pilger's book A Secret Country was published in 1989. It focuses on the same themes presented in this documentary.
