= David Munro (documentary filmmaker) =

English documentary filmmaker

Ivor David Munro (1 July 1944 – 5 August 1999) was an English documentary filmmaker. He collaborated on 20 documentary films for television with the Australian-born journalist, John Pilger, with many of their works receiving awards. Year Zero: The Silent Death of Cambodia, their 1979 documentary about the suffering people of Cambodia, resulted in viewers donating more than £45 million in aid.

== Early life and education ==
His parents were Hugh Munro (an actor and television director) and Pamela Barnard (an actress and later longstanding floor manager in Drama at the BBC). His grandfather was the actor Ivor Barnard. Ivor Munro had a brother Tim Munro, who also became an actor, and a sister Hatty.

Following a series of jobs, beginning as a farm labourer after leaving school, Munro became an actor for a time. He appeared in such series as Object Z (1965), Orlando (1966–67), Z-Cars, Tightrope (1972), and in the play The Bells (Vaudeville Theatre).

== Career in film-making ==
A connection with the actor David Swift via Tempest Films, an independent production company, led to Munro being introduced to the Australian-born journalist John Pilger. The two men first worked together on Do You Remember Vietnam? (1978), first shown by the ITV network.

In 1979 their film, Year Zero: The Silent Death of Cambodia, exposed the extent of the genocide perpetrated by Pol Pot and the Communist Party of Kampuchea against the people of Cambodia. Broadcast on British TV, it resulted in nearly £45 million being donated spontaneously by viewers, to help Cambodians.

In total Munro and Pilger collaborated on 20 films for television, for which Munro gained several awards and commendations. Munro made several films on his own: notably, Knots (with the Actors Company) based on R. D. Laing's poems; Going Back, about the experiences of the first four US soldiers to return to Vietnam after the war; and The Four Horseman, his trilogy of films about war in the Third World.

== Marriages and family ==
He was married three times, the first two relationships were with the actresses Sharon Duce and Susan Penhaligon. His son with Penhaligon, Truan Munro, has worked in the film industry. His third wife was Layhing Siu, to whom he was married at the end of his life. Their daughter Natalia, was born eighteen months before Munro's death from cancer. He also had a step-daughter, Pilar.
