= List of films about revolution =

List of films featuring revolution as a major topic

This article is a selection of films both fictional and non-fictional which focus on revolution, revolutionary movements and/or revolutionary characters as a theme.

== Films ==
Year	Title	Director	Genre	Themes
1914	La Commune	Armand Guerra	Drama	Paris Commune
1919	The New Moon	Chester Withey	Adventure Drama	Russian Revolution
1925	Strike	Sergei Eisenstein	Historical drama	Class struggle
1925	Battleship Potemkin	Sergei Eisenstein	Historical drama	1905 Russian Revolution
1928	Revolution: Ten Days that Shook the World	Sergei Eisenstein	Historical drama	October Revolution
1929	The New Babylon	Grigori Kozintsev and Leonid Trauberg	Historical drama	Paris Commune
1932	¡Que viva Mexico!	Sergei Eisenstein	Historical drama	History of Mexico (Mexican Revolution)
1933	Prisoner 13	Fernando de Fuentes	War Drama	Mexican Revolution
1933	Godfather Mendoza	Fernando de Fuentes	War Drama	Mexican Revolution, Zapatistas
1936	Let's Go with Pancho Villa	Fernando de Fuentes	War Drama	Mexican Revolution, Pancho Villa
1937	Aurora de esperanza	Antonio Sau	Drama	Spanish Revolution of 1936
1952	The Fighter	Herbert Kline	Film noir	Mexican Revolution
1952	Viva Zapata!	Elia Kazan	Historical drama	Emiliano Zapata, Mexican Revolution
1954	Animal Farm	John Halas & Joy Batchelor	Drama	Anti-Stalinism, Russian Revolution
1960	Spartacus	Stanley Kubrick	Historical drama	Third Servile War
1963	Ganga Zumba	Carlos Diegues	Historical drama	Revolution, Brazil
1964	Zulu	Cy Endfield	Historical drama	Battle of Rorke's Drift
1966	Khartoum	Basil Dearden	Historical drama	Siege of Khartoum
1966	Here Is Your Life	Jan Troell	Coming-of-age Drama	Revolutionary Socialism, World War I
1967	The Battle of Algiers	Gillo Pontecorvo	Historical drama	Algerian Revolution
1970	Cromwell	Ken Hughes	Historical drama	Revolution, England
1970	Emiliano Zapata	Felipe Cazals	Historical drama	Emiliano Zapata, Mexican Revolution
1970	Metello	Mauro Bolognini	Drama	Class struggle
1970	Wind from the East	Dziga Vertov Group	Drama	Class struggle
1971	Mexico, The Frozen Revolution	Raymundo Gleyzer	Documentary	Mexican Revolution
1971	A Fistful of Dynamite	Sergio Leone	Epic Western	Mexican Revolution
1972	Sambizanga	Sarah Maldoror	Historical drama	Angolan War of Independence
1972	Pink Flamingos	John Waters	Exploitation comedy	Sexual revolution
1972	A Luta Continua	Robert Van Lierop	Historical drama	Mozambican War of Independence
1972	Tout Va Bien	Jean-Luc Godard and Jean-Pierre Gorin	Political drama	Class struggle, May 68
1973	El principio	Gonzalo Martínez Ortega	Historical drama	Mexican Revolution
1975	Winstanley	Kevin Brownlow and Andrew Mollo	Biographical	Revolution, England
1978	Ora sí ¡tenemos que ganar!	Raúl Kamffer	Drama	Magonism, Mexican Revolution
1979	Zulu Dawn	Douglas Hickox	Historical drama	Battle of Isandlwana
1979	The Battle of Chile	Patricio Guzman	Documentary	Counterrevolution
1979	Siberiade	Andrei Konchalovsky	Historical drama	Russian Revolution
1981	Reds	Warren Beaty	Historical drama	Russian Revolution
1982	Gandhi	Richard Attenborough	Biographical	Indian Independence Movement
1985	Revolution	Hugh Hudson	Historical drama	American Revolutionary War
1986	Salvador	Oliver Stone	Historical drama	Salvadoran Revolution
1989	China: A Century of Revolution	Sue Williams	Documentary	Revolution, China
1989	The French Revolution	Robert Enrico (Part 1) Richard T. Heffron (Part 2)	Documentary	French Revolution
1992	The Crying Game	Neil Jordan	Historical drama	Revolution, Ireland
1995	Braveheart	Mel Gibson	Historical drama	Revolution, Great Britain
1996	Michael Collins	Neil Jordan	Biographical	Revolution, Ireland
1996	Evita	Alan Parker	Socio-Political Musical Film	Peronism
1997	Living Utopia	Juan Gamero	Documentary	Anarcho-syndicalism, Spanish Revolution
1998	A Place Called Chiapas	Nettie Wild	Documentary	Zapatista Army of National Liberation
1998	Jose Rizal	Marilou Diaz-Abaya	Biographical	Philippine Revolution
2000	Lumumba	Raoul Peck	Biographical	Congolese National Movement
2000	The Patriot	Roland Emmerich	Historical drama	American Revolutionary War
2002	Bringing Down a Dictator	Steve York	Documentary	Otpor!
2003	To Kill a King	Mike Barker	Historical drama	Revolution, England
2004	In My Country	John Boorman	Historical drama	Anti-Apartheid Movement
2005	V for Vendetta	James McTeigue	Political action film	Revolution
2006	The Wind That Shakes the Barley	Ken Loach	Historical drama	Irish War of Independence
2006	Alatriste	Agustín Díaz Yanes	Historical fiction	Revolution, Netherlands
2006	Thomas Sankara: The Upright Man	Robin Shuffield	Documentary	Revolution, Burkina Faso
2007	Namibia: The Struggle for Liberation	Charles Burnett	Historical drama	Namibian War of Independence
2008	Baler	Mark Meily	Historical drama	Philippine Revolution
2008	Che	Steven Soderbergh	Biographical	Cuban revolution
2009	Terror! Robespierre and the French Revolution	Carl Hindmarch	Documentary	French Revolution
2009	Bodyguards and Assassins	Teddy Chan	Historical drama	1911 Revolution
2009	Iran and the West	Norma Percy	Documentary	Iranian revolution
2010	Revolución: el cruce de los Andes	Leandro Ipiña	Historical drama	Argentina War of Independence
2010	Hidalgo: The story never told	Antonio Serrano	Biographical	Mexican War of Independence
2010	Outside the Law	Rachid Bouchareb	Historical drama	Revolution, Algeria
2010	Taita Boves	Luis Alberto Lamata	Biographical	Revolution, Venezuela
2010	Amílcar Cabral	Ana Ramos Lisboa	Documentary	Revolution, Guinea Bisseau
2011	How to Start a Revolution	Ruaridh Arrow	Documentary	Revolution
2012	Toussaint Louverture	Philippe Niang	Biographical	Haitian Revolution
2011	Merdeka 17805	Yukio Fuji	Historical drama	Indonesian National Revolution
2013	Mandela: Long Walk to Freedom	Justin Chadwick	Biographical	Anti-Apartheid Movement
2013	Tula: The Revolt	Jeroen Leinders	Historical drama	Slave Revolt of 1795
2013	The Liberator	Alberto Arvelo	Historical drama	Revolution, South America
2013	7 Assassins	Hung Yan-yan	Historical drama	Revolution, China
2015	Michiel de Ruyter	Roel Reiné	Historical drama	Revolution, Netherlands
2016	Kalushi	Mandla Dube	Historical drama	Revolution, South Africa
2016	The Birth of a Nation	Nate Parker	Historical drama	Nat Turner's slave rebellion
2017	Revolution Selfie	Steven de Castro	Documentary	New People's Army
2019	Ginnen Upan Seethala	Anuruddha Jayasinghe	Biographical	Revolution, Sri Lanka

== See also ==
- List of films about the American Revolution
- List of films set during the French Revolution and French Revolutionary Wars
- List of Irish revolutionary period films
- List of Iranian Revolution films
- List of films about revolutionary terrorism in the Russian Empire
- List of historical films
- List of films on imperialism
- List of films featuring colonialism
- List of films featuring slavery
- List of films that depict class struggle
