= List of films on imperialism =

List of films featuring imperialism as a major topic

This article is a selection of films and series both fictional and non-fictional which involve imperialism as a major theme.

== Films ==
Year	Title	Director	Genre	Themes
1936	A Message to Garcia	George Marshall	Historical drama	Spanish-American War
1939	The Four Feathers	Zoltan Korda	Historical drama	Mahdist War
1941	Ohm Krüger	Hans Steinhoff	Historical drama	Boer War
1945	Burma Victory	Roy Boulting	Historical drama	Burma Campaign
1962	Lawrence of Arabia	David Lean	Biographical	World War I
1966	Khartoum	Basil Dearden	Historical drama	Siege of Khartoum
1967	The Battle of Algiers	Gillo Pontecorvo	Historical drama	Algerian Revolution
1970	Shangani Patrol	David Millin	Historical drama	British colonialism
1972	Sambizanga	Sarah Maldoror	Historical drama	Angolan War of Independence
1972	A Luta Continua	Robert Van Lierop	Historical drama	Mozambican War of Independence
1979	Zulu Dawn	Douglas Hickox	Historical drama	Battle of Isandlwana
1980	Lion of the Desert	Moustapha Akkad	Historical drama	Italy in Lybya
1982	Gandhi	Richard Attenborough	Biographical	Indian Independence Movement
1982	Missing	Costa-Gavras	Historical drama	Chilean coup of 1973
1985	Revolution	Hugh Hudson	Historical drama	American Revolutionary War
1986	Salvador	Oliver Stone	Historical drama	Salvadoran Civil War
1992	The Crying Game	Neil Jordan	Historical drama	Revolution, Ireland
1995	Braveheart	Mel Gibson	Historical drama	Revolution, Great Britain
1994	Arende	Dirk de Villiers	Historical drama	Anglo Boer War
1996	Michael Collins	Neil Jordan	Biographical	Revolution, Ireland
1997	Rough Riders	John Milius	Historical drama	Spanish-American War
1998	Jose Rizal	Marilou Diaz-Abaya	Biographical	Philippine Revolution
1999	Adwa	Haile Gerima	Historical drama	Battle of Adwa
2000	Lumumba	Raoul Peck	Biographical	Congolese National Movement
2000	The Patriot	Roland Emmerich	Historical drama	American Revolutionary War
2006	Thomas Sankara: The Upright Man	Robin Shuffield	Documentary	Revolution, Burkina Faso
2007	Namibia: The Struggle for Liberation	Charles Burnett	Historical drama	Namibian War of Independence
2007	The War on Democracy	John Pilger	Historical drama	US Imperialism
2008	Baler	Mark Meily	Historical drama	Philippine Revolution
2010	Hidalgo: The story never told	Antonio Serrano	Biographical	Mexican War of Independence
2010	Revolución: el cruce de los Andes	Leandro Ipiña	Historical drama	Argentina War of Independence
2010	Françafrique	Patrick Benquet	Historical drama	African post colonialism
2010	Outside the Law	Rachid Bouchareb	Historical drama	Revolution, Algeria
2010	Amílcar Cabral	Ana Ramos Lisboa	Documentary	Revolution, Guinea Bisseau
2012	Toussaint Louverture	Philippe Niang	Biographical	Haitian Revolution
2013	Mandela: Long Walk to Freedom	Justin Chadwick	Biographical	Anti-Apartheid Movement
2013	The Liberator	Alberto Arvelo	Historical drama	Revolution, South America
2015	Queen of the Desert	Werner Herzog	Historical drama	British colonialism
2016	Kalushi	Mandla Dube	Historical drama	Revolution, South Africa
2006	Revolution Selfie	Steven de Castro	Documentary	Revolution, Philippines
2019	Ginnen Upan Seethala	Anuruddha Jayasinghe	Biographical	Revolution, Sri Lanka

== See also ==
- List of films about revolution
- List of films featuring colonialism
- List of films featuring slavery
- List of films that depict class struggle
