= List of films featuring colonialism =

Colonialism in the cinema has been the subject of many books and essays. Stereotyping, distortion, imagistic mistreatment, assimilationism and caricatural visions of colonies have been practiced in this type of cinema. Before 1960 most colonialism films were made with narratives constructed from the point of view of the colonizing nationals. During the era of colonialism, many European governments funded film projects which involved their overseas colonies; either for instructional purposes for individuals living in colonies or to support colonialism in general. The United States' settler colonialism resulted in the American westward expansion which led to the establishment of the so-called Western genre, which dealt with many colonialist topics; these have been subverted in Revisionist Westerns, which came about during a re-evaluation of the genre in the 1960s.

In June 2022, the Academy of Motion Picture Arts and Sciences issued a formal written apology to actress and activist Sacheen Littlefeather in relation to the management of her appearance on behalf of Marlon Brando to decline an Academy Award. In 1973, Sacheen declined the best actor award on Brando's behalf "...in recognition of the misrepresentation and mistreatment of Native American people by the film industry..."

== List of colonialism-related films ==
The following is an alphabetical list of films and series that feature or relate to colonialism.

Film	Year	Description
Adwa	1999	In 1896, Ethiopia defeats an Italian army bent on conquest and colonization at the Battle of Adwa.
African's Black Star: The Legacy of Kwame Nkrumah	2011	Film about the rise and fall of Ghana's colonial liberation leader Kwame Nkrumah.
Africa Addio	1966	Documentary about the end of the colonial era in Africa, and the violence and chaos that followed.
Afrique 50	1950	Film about colonization in Ivory Coast during French rule.
Aguirre, the Wrath of God	1972	Film by Werner Herzog, based on the journey of Spanish explorer Lope de Aguirre during his 16th-century attempts to conquer what is now Peru.
An American Genocide	1999	ABC Australia-produced film about the genocide of Mayan nations in Guatemala. Video.
Amistad	1997	About a slave revolt in 1839 by Mende captives, who had been captured and sold to European slave traders, and illegally transported by a Portuguese ship from West Africa to Cuba. Two Spanish plantation owners, bought 53 captives, including four children, in Havana, Cuba, and were transporting them on the ship Amistad to their plantations in Cuba.
Amigo	2010	Events in the Philippines in 1900 during the Philippine–American War.
Another Country	2015	Examines how a traditional way of life has been disrupted by Australia, and the consequences that has had for the Yolngu people.
The Australian Dream	2019	Featuring Australian Football League (AFL) player Adam Goodes, the film examines Australian Aboriginal identity and racism in modern Australia.
Baler	2008	Set in the late 19th century, this historical fiction is based on the siege of Baler, a colonial Spanish military base by Filipino revolutionaries.
Bamako	2006	The film about the relation between historical colonization and African issues including a trial and debt.
Barkskins	2020	Colonial French and English, and Indigenous peoples enter conflict in New France.
The Battle of Algiers	1966	An Italian-Algerian film covering the struggle for decolonization in French Algeria in the context of the Battle of Algiers.
Beans	2020	It explores the 1990 Oka Crisis at Kanesatake a Mohawk settlement in southwestern Quebec, Canada.
Beatriz's War	2013	During the Indonesian occupation, a young East Timorese woman named Beatriz struggles.
Bengal Shadows	2018	This 50-minute featurette is a film on the causes of the Bengal famine of 1943 during the period of British rule in India.
Berlin 1885: The Division of Africa	2010	A drama about the Scramble for Africa.
Between Two Worlds: The Story of Gonzalo Guerrero	2012	Film based on the life of Spanish soldier Gonzalo Guerrero and his transition to fight on the side of colonized Mayas.
The Birth of a Nation	1915	An American drama film that depicts African Americans in a negative light and glorified the Ku Klux Klan. Despite its controversy and protests by activists, the film was a commercial success.
The Birth of a Nation	2016	Based on the life of Nat Turner, a former slave in America, who leads a liberation movement to free African Americans in Virginia that results in a violent retaliation from whites.
Bitter Springs	1950	An Australian pioneer family in the Australian outback in 1900 has problems with local Aboriginal people arise over the possession of a waterhole.
Black and White in Color	1976	French colonists in Africa enter World War 1 with help of locals against Germans in a neighbouring colony.
Black Robe	1991	Based on the fictional novel of the same name. Set in the 17th century, it depicts the adventures of a Jesuit missionary tasked with founding a mission in New France.
Blood of the Condor	1969	Forced sterilization to prevent births amongst Indigenous Bolivians.
The Book of Negroes	2015	A Canadian television series based on the book of the same name. The series deals with the experiences of Black Loyalists during the Revolutionary War.
Bounty	2021	Members of the Penobscot Nation in Maine present the difficult history of around 70 cases of government-endorsed scalping of Indigenous people. Video link
55 Days in Peking	1963	The Boxers oppose the westerners in China in an anti-foreign, anti-colonial, and anti-Christian movement.
Brave New Land	2000	Portuguese colonial lives in 18th century Brazil.
Burn!	1969	An agent provocateur is sent to the fictional island of Queimada, a Portuguese colony in the Caribbean to replace the Portuguese administration by a formally sovereign state controlled by white latifundistes friendly to the British government. To realize this project, the agent persuades the black slaves to fight for their liberation from slavery.
Bury My Heart at Wounded Knee	2007	A film about the history of Indigenous peoples in the American West in the 1860s and 1870s, focusing upon the transition from traditional ways of living to living on reservations.
Cabeza de Vaca	1991	Mexican film about the explorations of Álvar Núñez Cabeza de Vaca in the New World. He was one of four survivors of the 1527 Narváez expedition.
Camp de Thiaroye	1989	Senegalese film about the struggle for decolonization in French Senegal depicting the Thiaroye massacre. The film was banned in France for a decade and censored in Senegal as well.
A Captain's Honor	1982	A courtroom-drama about a dead French Algeria Captain whose memory is publicly accused by a historian.
Catch a Fire	2006	A film about Patrick Chamusso andt activists against apartheid in South Africa.
Ceddo	1977	The film is set in the 17th century, and focuses on the conflict between traditional African customs and encroaching foreign cultures. It analyses the multi-dimensional reactions of African traditionalists to the advent of Islam, Christianity, and colonialism.
Chittagong	2012	Based upon events of the Chittagong armoury raid in British India.
Chocolat	1988	The daughter of a French colonial administrator befriends a servant in French Cameroon.
El Cimarron	2007	Based on the life of Marcos Xiorro who conspired and planned a slave revolt in Puerto Rico in 1821 against the Spanish Empire.
Clive of India	1935	Historical biographical film about the life of Robert Clive.
Cobra Verde	1987	A criminal called Cobra Verde is paid by a plantation owner, but Cobra Verde is sent to Africa and his fortunes change.
Columbus in America	2018	A film about the controversy in America surrounding the life of Christopher Columbus, an Italian official commissioned by the Spanish Crown to find an alternate commercial route to Asia by travelling West. Commentators challenge traditional representations of Christopher Columbus, bringing issues of imperialism, colonialism, racism, greed, religion, and human rights into focus.
Concerning Violence	2014	About the African independence movements in the 1960s and 1970s.
The Convert	2023	A preacher arrives at a British settlement in New Zealand in the 1830s.
Cousins	2021	At a young age, an Indigenous child is sent to a residential school. There, she is renamed and grows up ignorant of her Māori culture, language, and family.
Cry Freedom	1986	The film centres on the real-life events involving black activist Steve Biko and his friend Donald Woods.
Dispute in Valladolid	1992	A French telefilm about the Valladolid debate in which European authorities debated whether Indigenous peoples had a soul.
Doctrine of Recovery	2022	Three generations of First Nations' women speak to the ongoing destructive formula patterned by the Discovery Doctrine.
Dances with Wolves	1990	Fictional story of a Union soldier travelling to the American frontier and his interactions with Indigenous peoples.
Days of Glory	2006	French film about the contribution of colonial French North Africa's soldiers during the Second World War.
Dawn of the Damned	1966	French-shot film footage of their tortures, massacres and executions of Algerians.
The Descendants	2011	A Honolulu-based attorney and the sole trustee of a family trust of 100 km^{2} of pristine land on Kauai.
El Despojo	2004	A film about the Mapuche Indians of Chile and their struggle for self-determination.
Diamond City	1949	In 1870s South Africa, Englishman Stafford Parker tries to persuade Boer leader Jan Bloem to hand over control of a potential diamond field.
The Drum	1938	The film about British rule in India was well received in Britain but caused protests when shown in Bombay and Madras.
Elephant Walk	1954	A colonial tea planter takes a wife to the plantation house built by his father in Ceylon.
Embrace of the Serpent	2015	Two explorers traveled through the Amazon and saw the effects of colonialism on the indigenous cultures they encountered.
The Emigrants	1971	A Swedish film depicting poor Swedes who emigrate in the mid-19th century and claim land in Minnesota, USA.
Emitai	1971	A 1971 Senegalese drama film directed by Ousmane Sembène set with the Vichy government conscripting men from France's colonies.
Epitaph	2015	On the orders of Hernan Cortés, three Spanish soldiers travel to the Popocatepetl volcano with the task of looking for sulfur necessary for the war. The conquerors will face their fears on the journey in an inhospitable territory.
Eureka Stockade	1949	British film of the story surrounding Irish-Australian rebel and politician Peter Lalor and the gold miners' rebellion of 1854 at the Eureka Stockade in Ballarat, Victoria.
Everything is connected	2022	The film tells the story of five Sixties Scoop survivors – 4 women and 1 man – all of whom had someone close to them become either missing or murdered. The film points to the inter-generational trauma of colonialism, residential schools, and the Sixties Scoop as forces that connect all of these tragedies Video.
Eye for Eye	1918	An American drama film set in the colonial Sahara Desert involving a Bedouin woman with a colonial French captain.
Exterminate All the Brutes	2021	The four-part series follows colonization and multiple genocides, and the effect of both, alongside imperialism and white supremacy. Based on the book Exterminate All the Brutes by Sven Lindqvist, An Indigenous Peoples' History of the United States by Roxanne Dunbar-Ortiz, and Silencing the Past by Michel-Rolph Trouillot.
Faces of colonialism	2023	Robert Lohmeyer is a photographer who captured the first color photographs of Togo, Cameroon, German Southwest Africa and German East Africa in a way that promoted colonialism.
Farewell to the King	1989	A 1989 American fiction adventure drama film starring Nick Nolte in which an American deserter becomes the leader of a head-hunting tribe of Dayaks.
Farha	2021	Film about a Palestinian girl's coming-of-age experience during the Nakba, the 1948 displacement of Palestinians from their homeland.
First Charge of the Machete	1969	Cuban peasants rebel against Spanish Cuba in the late 19th century.
Fitzcarraldo	1982	It portrays would-be rubber baron Brian Sweeney Fitzgerald, an Irishman known in Peru as Fitzcarraldo, who is determined to transport a steamship over a steep hill to access a rich rubber territory in the Amazon Basin. The film is derived from the historic events of Peruvian rubber baron Carlos Fitzcarrald and his real-life feat of transporting a disassembled steamboat over the Isthmus of Fitzcarrald.
Five Fingers For Marseilles	2017	A rebellious character returns to a colonial town in South Africa after fleeing police aggression two decades before, and finds the town under a new threat.
The Flood	2020	An Aboriginal woman raised on a Christian mission in Australia seeks revenge.
Follow the River	1995	A film surrounding events after the Draper's Meadow Massacre of 1755.
The Four Feathers	1939	A British film about the story of a young British private during the Sudan campaign of 1898 of the Mahdist War.
Four Men and a Prayer	1938	A British Army Officer, is cashiered in India following accusations of dereliction of duty.
Fort Apache	1948	Film starring John Wayne in which the American army battles with Indigenous nations, inspired by the Battle of the Little Bighorn and the Fetterman Fight.
Fort Saganne	1984	A European soldier of humble beginnings who volunteers for service in the Sahara in 1911.
Fury at Furnace Creek	1948	Troops are massacred at a Furnace Creek fort in 1880 by Apache.
Ganga Zumba	1963	Not released until 1972 because of a military coup in Brazil, this Brazilian film highlights Ganga Zumba, a 17th-century slave revolutionary against the Portuguese Empire.
Gandhi	1982	A biographical film about anti-colonial nationalist and lawyer Mahatma Gandhi's involvement in the Indian liberation movement.
Geronimo: An American Legend	1993	Events leading up to the surrender of Geronimo in 1886.
Ghosts of Amistad	2014	Ghosts of Amistad chronicles a trip to Sierra Leone to visit the home villages of the people who seized the slave schooner La Amistad in 1839, to interview elders about local memory of the case, and to search for the long-lost ruins of Lomboko, the slave trading factory where their cruel transatlantic voyage began. Video
Give Us Our Skeletons	1999	Following the 1852 Kautokeino rebellion against the Norwegian government.
Gold	2017	Spanish historical drama film directed by Agustín Díaz Yanes. The film is based on a short story by Arturo Pérez-Reverte and depicts a 16th-century Spanish expedition during the Colonization of the Americas aiming at locating El Dorado. It is loosely inspired on expeditions by conquistadors Lope de Aguirre and Nuñez de Balboa.
Gold Coast	2015	In 1836 a Danish man travels to Africa to create plantations on the Danish Gold Coast.
GomBurZa	2023	A Philippine film about three secular priests falsely accused of inciting an anti-colonial insurrection put on a show trial and executed by strangulation during the era of Spanish imperial rule.
The Great Indian Wars	1991	A video series about the encroachment of European settlers upon Indigenous lands and their reaction in their struggle to survive.
Gunga Din	1939	This American film is a fictional story about three British Indian Army officers who fight the Thuggee, an Indian cult, in British India.
Haiti: The Way of Freedom	1975	The fight of the Haitian Indigenous and enslaved people for their freedom from European rule.
Headline Today: Guatemala	1983	A documentary about the Civil War in Guatemala from Finnish television presented by two US reporters.
Heart of Darkness	1993	A film based on the book Heart of Darkness by Joseph Conrad about a narrated voyage up the Congo River into the Congo Free State by an Ivory trader.
Heart of Whiteness	2006	South African filmmaker Rehad Desai travels to Orania in the Northern Cape, to investigate what it means to be white in the new South Africa.
Hernan Cortes, A Man between God and the Devil	2016	Biographical film about Hernan Cortes who invaded and destroyed Tenochtitlan with assistance of the rivals of the Aztecs.
Hidalgo: The story never told	2010	A Mexican film about the life of Mexico's liberation from Spanish colonial rule leader Miguel Hidalgo.
Hostiles	2017	An American revisionist Western film about a story between a US army official and a few members of Indigenous peoples within North America.
The Hour of Liberation Has Arrived	1974	A story of colonialism and the struggle for liberation in Oman.
How Tasty Was My Little Frenchman	1971	A fictional story set in 16th century Brazil where rival French and Portuguese settlers are utilizing the Indigenous people as allies in their struggle to establish control.
Human Zoo: The Final Journey of Calafate	2011	At the end of the 19th century, four groups of Indigenous people (a total of 25 people, from infants to the elderly) were taken from Chile by a German businessman and were shown as animals in different fairs and public exhibitions in several Europeans cities.
Independencia	2009	Three generations of a family who flees American colonization and tries to survive in the jungle.
The Indian Wars: Change of Worlds	2007	A six part video series journeys back through history to the battles from the first settlements to the last massacre that created a change of worlds as the United States stretched from the Atlantic to the Pacific.
If Only I Were That Warrior	2015	A look at the Italian occupation of Ethiopia in 1935. Following the construction of a monument dedicated to Fascist general Rodolfo Graziani, the film addresses the unpunished war crimes he and others committed in the name of Mussolini's imperial ambitions.
In My Country	2004	The film is centred around the story of Afrikaner poet Anna Malan and an American journalist sent to South Africa to report about the South African Truth and Reconciliation Commission hearings.
Indian Horse	2017	The film centres on Saul Indian Horse, a young Canadian First Nations boy who survives the Canada's Indian residential school system to become a star ice hockey player.
Ishi, The Last Yahi	1993	In the early 1900s, Ishi, the last of the Yahi Indian nation in California, is discovered nearly 20 years after the Yahi tribe was thought to be wiped out.
Jedda	1955	Jedda is an Aboriginal girl born on a cattle station in the Northern Territory of Australia.
Ka Whawhai Tonu	2024	The siege of Ōrākau in 1864 during the New Zealand Wars from the perspective of the Māori.
Kalushi	2016	A story based on true events about Solomon Kalushi Mahlangu, a nineteen-year-old that goes into self-exile following the 1976 Soweto uprisings to join the liberation movement.
Kartini	2017	About Kartini a prominent Indonesian activist who advocated for women's rights in Dutch Indonesia.
Khartoum	1966	The film is based on historical accounts of Gordon's defence of the Sudanese city of Khartoum from the forces of the Mahdist army, during the 1884–1885 Siege of Khartoum.
Killers of the Flower Moon	2023	A series of Indigenous murders in the Osage Nation during the 1920s, committed after oil was discovered on tribal land. Based on the 2017 non-fiction book of the same name.
Kim	1950	Based on the classic 1901 novel of the same name by Rudyard Kipling.
King of the Khyber Rifles	1953	Adventures of a British military man during the British Raj.
King Leopold's Ghost	2006	A film about the exploitation of the Congo by King Leopold II of Belgium.
King Solomon's mines	1937	Based on the 1885 novel of the same name by Henry Rider Haggard.
The Kitchen Toto	1988	In Kenya in 1950, a British policeman takes a murdered black priest's son to live with him at his home as a houseboy.
Kongo: 50 years of independence of Congo	2010	Documentary series on the history of the Congo from the 15th century to 21st century.
Kroktoa	2017	An aboriginal youth is taken to serve a colonial administrator in Cape Colony.
Lagaan: Once Upon a Time in India	2001	A Hindi-language musical film about a fictional colonial-era cricket competition that pits desperate but untrained villagers against an amateur but seasoned British cricket team. In the midst of a harsh drought, the stakes are a doubling or cancellation of the agricultural tax.
Lakota Woman: Siege at Wounded Knee	1994	The film is based on Mary Crow Dog's autobiography Lakota Woman, wherein she accounts her involvement with the American Indian Movement and relationship with Lakota medicine man and activist Leonard Crow Dog.
The Lion Has Seven Heads	1970	In the late 1960s, a white preacher in Africa fights a Latin American revolutionary.
Lion of the Desert	1981	Historical epic war film about the Second Italo-Senussi War, starring Anthony Quinn as Libyan tribal leader Omar Mukhtar, a Bedouin leader fighting the Regio Esercito (Italian Royal Army) and Oliver Reed as Italian General Rodolfo Graziani.
Little Bird	2023	The series centres on a First Nations woman who was adopted during the Sixties Scoop, as she attempts to reconnect with her origins.
La Llorona	2019	Former Guatemalan dictator and military general Enrique Monteverde (based on Efraín Ríos Montt) is convicted for directing the genocide of native Mayans in 1982–83. He is terrorized by ghosts from the past and present, and becomes ill.
The Last of the Mohicans	1920	An American film adapted from James Fenimore Cooper's 1826 fictional novel of the same name.
Last of the Mohicans	1992	Based on the 1826 novel of the same name by James Fenimore Cooper.
Last Stand in the Philippines	1945	Spanish biographical war film directed by Antonio Román.
The Last Supper	1976	A colonial plantation owner during Spanish colonial times recreates the last supper using slaves, in order to teach them about Christianity.
The Last Tasmanian: Extinction	1980	Tells the story of the European colonization of Tasmania and the ultimate fate of the Tasmanian people.Video
Latin History for Morons	2018	In this one-man Netflix show, John Leguizamo finds humor and heartbreak as he traces 3,000 years of Latin history in an effort to help his son find his identity and deal with abuse.
The Liberator	2013	A Spanish–Venezuelan about the life of Simon Bolivar.
Little Big Man	1970	A white man who was raised by members of the Cheyenne nation during the 19th century and then attempts to reintegrate with American pioneer society.
The Lives of a Bengal Lancer	1935	An American film about a group of British cavalrymen trying to defend their stronghold and headquarters at Bengal against enemy forces during the period of the British colonial rule in India.
Lousy Little Sixpence	1983	Film about the stolen generations in Australia.
Lumumba	2000	Biographical film directed by Raoul Peck. The film depicts the rise and fall of Patrice Lumumba, and is set in the months before and after Congo-Léopoldville achieved freedom from Belgium in June 1960.
Lumumba: Death of a Prophet	1991	Award-winning film about the life of Patrice Lumumba.
A Man Called Horse	1970	An English aristocrat who is captured by the Sioux people.
Man to Man	2005	In 1860, Victorian scientists capture a pygmy couple during an expedition in Central Africa.
The Man Who Would Be King	1975	Two military veterans roam India during the British Raj and one of them is taken for a god by the locals, with the ensuing chaos.
Malintzin: The Story of an Enigma	2019	Film about the story of an Indigenous woman called Malintzin or La Malinche, who was the translator (and diplomat) of Hernán Cortés back in 1519 when his warriors started the project to conquer Tenochtitlan.
Mandela: Long Walk to Freedom	2013	A film based on the autobiographical book Long Walk to Freedom by anti-apartheid revolutionary and former South African President Nelson Mandela.
Manganinnie	1980	An Australian film set in the Black War of 1830 in Van Diemen's Land. Manganinnie, a Tasmanian Aboriginal woman, survives a raid and searches for her tribe with the company of a lost white girl.
Max Havelaar	1976	Based on the 1860 novel Max Havelaar by Multatuli.
Meek's Cutoff	2010	Frontier guide Stephen Meek led a wagon train through the Oregon desert along the Meek Cutoff in the United States.
Michael Collins	1996	Michael Collins is a leading figure in the early-20th-century Irish struggle for independence against Britain.
Miranda Returns	2007	The struggle for Venezuela's independence and Francisco de Miranda in South America.
The Mission	1986	Based on events surrounding the Treaty of Madrid in 1750, in which Spain ceded part of Jesuit Paraguay to Portugal.
Mister Johnson	1990	A Nigerian who works as a clerk for the British colonial civil service and adopts the style of the British colonialists in the belief that he is a true Englishman.
Mother Dao, the Turtlelike	1995	A film about Dutch colonialism in Indonesia during the early 20th century.
The Naked Prey	1966	An adventurer in colonial Africa is hunted by an angry tribe.
Namibia: Genocide and the Second Reich	2005	In 1904–1908, three quarters of the Herero nation and half of the Namaqua nation of the German colony of Namibia were killed in the Herero and Namaqua genocide, many in concentration camps. This BBC film tells this forgotten story and its links to German racial "theories".
Namibia: The Struggle for Liberation	2007	An epic film on the Namibian liberation struggle against South African occupation as seen through the life of Sam Nujoma, the leader of the South West Africa People's Organisation and the first president of the Republic of Namibia.
Neither Wolf Nor Dog	2017	The film was primarily shot on Pine Ridge Indian Reservation, which borders South Dakota and Nebraska. The film is notable for a climatic scene shot at Wounded Knee where the Wounded Knee Massacre happened in 1890. The film stars Chief Dave Bald Eagle in the lead role as a Lakota elder.
Netaji Subhas Chandra Bose: The Forgotten Hero	2004	A biographical film about Subhas Chandra Bose who fought for Indian independence against the British Raj by forming the Indian National Army with the help of Japan.
The New Land	1972	The Swedish film depicts the struggles of the European migrants to establish a settlement in North America.
The New World	2005	Largely fictionalized retelling of the relationship between John Smith and Pocahontas.
The Nightingale	2018	An Australian film set in 1825 in the penal colony of Van Diemen's Land (present-day Tasmania), depicting the story of an Irish woman trying to avenge her husband during the Black War.
NZ Wars: Stories of Tainui	2021	The 1863 invasion of the Waikato in New Zealand. Video
Older than America	2008	A drama film about the atrocities that took place at an American Indian boarding school.
Once Upon a Time... The Americas	1991	A French animated TV series directed by Albert Barillé. An episode on the Spanish Golden Age was censored in Spain.
Once Were Warriors	1997	Award-winning film that explores the effects of the colonisation of New Zealand suffered by Māori.
The Only Good Indian	2009	In the early 1900s, a Kickapoo youth is taken from his family and forced to attend a distant American Indian boarding school, designed to achieve to his assimilation into western society.
The Other Conquest	2000	The film is a drama about the aftermath of the 1520s Spanish Conquest of Mexico told from the perspective of the Indigenous Aztec people. It explores the social, religious, and economic changes brought about by a historical process of colonization that both defined the American continent.
An Outpost of Progress	2016	A film based on An Outpost of Progress by Joseph Conrad based upon his experiences in the Congo.
Outside the Law	2010	A drama about the Algerian struggle for independence from France after World War II.
The Pearl Button	2015	The documentary examines the fate of two persecuted groups in Chile - the indigenous peoples and the victims of Pinochet.
Pedjuang	1961	Film about protagonists of 1947 Indonesian war of liberation.
Plains: Testimony of an Ethnocide	1971	A film on the massacre of Indigenous peoples in the Colombian east plains in 1970.
Planter's Wife	1952	Set in the Malayan Emergency and a campaign of sustained attacks by insurgents.
El Presidente: General Emilio Aguinaldo Story and the First Philippine Republic	2012	Emilio Aguinaldo's efforts to coordinate colonial resistance against the Spanish.
Princess Kaiulani	2009	The life of Princess Kaiulani (1875–1899) of the Kingdom of Hawaiʻi struggling for independence from the United States.
Quilombo	1984	Account of Quilombo dos Palmares, a 17th-century Brazilian community of escaped slaves within the Portuguese Empire. Features its one-time leader, Zumbi.
Rabbit-Proof Fence	2002	Award-winning film that illustrates the official child removal policy that existed in Australia between 1905 and 1967. Its victims now are called the "Stolen Generations".
Radiance	1998	The story of three sisters in the context of Australia's Stolen Generations.
Rebellion	2011	Film about the Ouvéa cave hostage taking by Indigenous rebels.
Reclaiming History	2024	Documentary about the role of German and Belgian colonialism in the 1994 genocide against the Tutsi in Rwanda.
Red Island	2023	Follows a ten-year-old boy and his family stationed in a French military base in Madagascar.
Reel Bad Arabs	2006	A film based on the book of the same name by Jack Shaheen, which also analyzes how Hollywood misrepresents the image of Arabs. The film analyzes 1,000 films that have Arab and Muslim characters, produced between 1896 and 2000.
Remember the Children	2022	This film is about the children who perished at the Rapid City Indian Boarding School, one of more than 400 American Indian boarding schools. The school operated from 1898 to 1933.
The Revenant	2015	A member of an American frontier fur trading expedition in the 1820s fights for survival in North America, while trying to avenge his Indigenous family.
River Queen	2005	The film takes place in New Zealand in 1868 during Titokowaru's War phase of the New Zealand Wars between the Māori and New Zealand colonial forces.
Rhodes of Africa	1936	British biographical film charting the life of Cecil Rhodes.
Robinson Crusoe	1954	Fictional account of a castaway who spends years on a remote tropical desert island encountering cannibals before being rescued.
Romero	1989	A biographical film depicting the story of Salvadoran Archbishop Óscar Romero, who organized peaceful protests against the violent military regime.
RRR	2022	Fictional account of two Indian revolutionaries who befriend each other and fight against the British Raj.
Rhymes for Young Ghouls	2013	Film that takes place in the context of a reservation and a Canadian residential school.
Safari	1956	An American white hunter is on a safari, and Mau Mau rebels attack his farm.
Sambizanga	1972	A film about the colonial liberation movement in Angola against the Portuguese Empire.
Sami Blood	2016	A Sami youth is exposed to racism and phrenological examinations in her boarding school.
Samson and Delilah	2009	The film depicts two Indigenous Australian 14-year-olds living in a remote Aboriginal community.
Sanders of the River	1935	A British film set in Colonial Nigeria depicting the experience of a district officer.
Sarraounia	1986	Battle of Lougou between queen Sarraounia and the advancing French Colonial Forces of the Voulet-Chanoine Mission in 1899.
The Searchers	1956	An American Western film directed by John Ford, based on the 1954 novel by Alan Le May, set during the Texas–Indian wars, and starring John Wayne as a middle-aged Civil War veteran who spends years looking for his niece abducted by Comanches.
Seargants Three	1962	A remake of Gunga Din (1939).
The Secret Country: The First Australians Fight Back	1985	It details the persecution of Aboriginal Australians and Torres Strait Islanders throughout Australia's history. Video
The Secret Nation	1989	An Indigenous man returns to his Aymara community from which he was expelled long ago.
The Seekers	1954	Maoris attack an English settlement in New Zealand.
Shaka Zulu	1986	A historical account on the life of the Zulu King Shaka.
Shangani Patrol	1970	A last stand fought by the British South Africa Police in the First Matabele War (1893–1894).
Shout at the Devil	1976	Based on a novel by Wilbur Smith which is very loosely inspired by real the sinking of the SMS Königsberg.
Simba	1955	A British family living in East Africa, who become embroiled in the Mau Mau Uprising.
Sitting Bull	1954	Depicts the war between Sitting Bull and the American forces, and the Battle of the Little Bighorn.
Six Hours in Yogya	1951	Recapture of the town of Yogyakarta from Dutch forces in March 1949.
Smoke Signals	1998	A coming of age film set on the Coeur d'Alene Indian Reservation in Plummer, Idaho.
The Sleeping Dictionary	2003	During the 1930s, British colonial officer John Truscott (Hugh Dancy) journeys to a remote village in colonial Malaysia to educate and Westernize the local Iban population.
Soldier Blue	1970	Inspired by events of the 1864 Sand Creek massacre in the Colorado Territory, USA.
Something of Value	1957	It shows the colonial and native African conflict caused by colonialism and differing views on how life should be lived. It stars Rock Hudson as the colonial and Sidney Poitier as the native Kenyan. The two men grew up together but have drifted apart at maturity.
The Sons of the Great Bear	1966	A German revisionist Western film that turned the traditional American "Cowboy and Indian" conventions on their head, casting the Indigenous peoples as the heroes and the American Army as the villains.
Squanto: A Warrior's Tale	1994	Based on the life of Squanto upon the arrival of the Mayflower in 1620.
Stealing a Nation	2004	A 2004 film about the British–American clandestine operation that saw the expulsion of the Chagossian population who have lived on Diego Garcia and neighbouring islands.
Stolen	2024	A Sámi girl seeks revenge against a poacher.
Sundown	1941	British colonial authorities fight against fascist forces in Africa.
Sun Never Sets	1939	American drama film about British colonialism in Africa.
Sweet Country	2017	Set in 1929 in the Australian Northern Territory against the backdrop of a divided society.
Tabataba	1988	Film about the Malagasy Uprising, a nationalist rebellion against French colonial rule in Madagascar.
The Territory	2022	It follows a young Indigenous leader of the Uru-eu-wau-wau people fighting back against farmers, colonizers and settlers who encroach on a protected area of the Amazon rainforest.
Thunder Bay	2023	Film series about the murder of Indigenous youths in Thunder Bay, Canada.
Thunderheart	1992	The film is a fictional portrayal of events relating to the Wounded Knee incident in 1973.
Tjoet Nja' Dhien	1988	A film about Acehnese guerrilla leader Cut Nyak Dhien in conflict with the Dutch colonial army.
Toussaint Louverture	2012	French historical film based on the life of Toussaint Louverture, leader of the Haitian emancipation revolution against French colonial rule.
The Tracker	2002	In outback Australia, a colonial policeman gets help from an Indigenous Australian tracker to locate the murderer of a Western woman.
Tula: The Revolt	2013	In 1795 on Curaçao, then a Dutch colony, a slave uprising takes place.
Twice Colonized	2023	Aaju Peter is an Inuk lawyer and activist who has lived in both Greenland and Nunavut working for the enforcement of Inuit rights.
Two Mementos	1985	A man joins the anti-Dutch freedom movement in the 1930s.
Utopia	2013	Written, produced and presented by John Pilger and directed by Pilger and Alan Lowery, that explores the experiences of Aboriginal Australians in modern Australia. The title is derived from the Aboriginal homeland community of Utopia, Northern Territory. Video
Utu	1983	Partly inspired by events from Te Kooti's War, the film tells of a Māori scout setting out to get utu (vengeance) on colonial forces after the destroy his home village. The film is set in 1870.
Unsettled	2021	The series centres on a First Nations woman in Canada who was adopted during the Sixties Scoop.
Veera Puran Appu	1978	Film about Veera Puran Appu and the Matale rebellion in 1848 for the freedom from British.
A Very British Way of Torture	2022	A film about the use of torture by the British colonial administration in Kenya against the Kenya Land and Freedom Army during the Mau Mau rebellion in the 1950s.
Viceroy's House	2017	A film about Lord Mountbatten and his involvement in the partition of India.
Waiting for the Barbarians	2019	A magistrate at an isolated outpost reevaluates his loyalty to his nation when an army colonel uses cruel tactics to interrogate the locals about a possible uprising.
Walkabout	1971	Two siblings are lost in the Australian Outback, where they learn to survive with the help of an Aboriginal boy they meet on his walkabout: a ritual of his culture.
Warriors of the Rainbow: Seediq Bale	2011	An indigenous group the Seediq people living in Taiwan find their way of life threatened.
We of the Never Never	1982	Jeannie, an educated woman from the upper-middle class of society, adapts to life in the outback of Australia.
We Were Children	1992	A 2012 Canadian film about the experiences of First Nations children in the Canadian Indian residential school system.
West of Zanzibar	1954	A British film sequel to Where No Vultures Fly (1951).
When the Mountains Tremble	1983	Documentary about the war between the Guatemalan Military and the Mayan Indigenous population.
Where the Green Ants Dream	1984	Based on a true story about Indigenous land rights in Australia about a land feud between a mining company and the local Aboriginal people.
Where the Spirit Lives	1989	A 1989 television film about Aboriginal children in Canada being taken from their society to attend residential schools for assimilation into alien mainstream culture.
White Material	2009	A white French farmer runs a failing coffee plantation in an unnamed African country.
White Sun of the Desert	1970	A Russian 1970 'Eastern' or Ostern fictional film of the Soviet Union.
White Mischief	1987	Based upon the non-fiction book White Mischief: The Murder of Lord Erroll (1982) by James Fox.
Wildhood	2021	A young man is raised disconnected from his maternal Mi'kmaq heritage by his abusive white father.
The Winds of the Aures	1966	An Algerian widows struggles as the colonial war destroys her family.
The Wind That Shakes the Barley	2006	A film about the Irish War of Independence.
Zabana!	2012	Film about Algerian freedom fighter Ahmed Zabana.
Zama	2017	An Argentinian film set in the late 18th century in a remote South American colony under the Spanish Empire, and portrays the period's "naturalness of slavery".
Zulu	1964	A 1964 British epic war film depicting the Battle of Rorke's Drift between the British Army and the Zulus in January 1879.
Zulu Dawn	1979	A 1979 British epic war film depicting the Battle of Isandlwana between the British Army and the Zulus in January 1879.
500 Años	2017	Film about the trial of Guatemalan dictator Efraín Ríos Montt for the Guatemalan genocide.
499	2020	Exploration of the legacy of colonialism in contemporary Mexico, 500 years after the Spanish conquest.
1491	2017	Series based on best-selling book "1491: New Revelations of the Americas Before Columbus" by Charles C. Mann.
1492: Conquest of Paradise	1992	The travels of Christopher Columbus and the effect this had on Indigenous peoples in the Americas.

== See also ==
- Colonial cinema
- List of films about revolution
- List of films on imperialism
- List of films featuring slavery
- List of films that depict class struggle
- Native Americans in film

== Related documentaries ==
- Imagining Indians (1992): a 1992 film produced and directed by Indigenous filmmaker, Victor Masayesva Jr. (Hopi). The film attempts to reveal the misrepresentation of Indigenous culture and tradition in Classical Hollywood films through interviews with different Indigenous actors from various tribes in North America.
- Inventing the Indian (2012): a 2012 BBC film that explores the stereotypical view of Indigenous peoples in the United States in cinema and literature.
- Reel Injun (2009): a 2009 Canadian film directed by Cree filmmaker Neil Diamond, Catherine Bainbridge, and Jeremiah Hayes that covers the portrayal of Indigenous peoples in film.
