= List of films that depict class struggle =

This is a list of films in which the theme of class struggle is a prominent element.

Title	Year	Citation
1984	1956	
The Admirable Crichton	1957	
Aladdin	1992	
The Angry Silence	1960	
Antz	1998	
At War	2018	
The Battle of Algiers	1966	
Battleship Potemkin	1925	
Bicycle Thieves	1948	
Blue Collar	1978	
Born in Flames	1983	
Boxcar Bertha	1972	
Brazil	1985	
Bread and Roses	2000	
A Bug's Life	1998	
Bulworth	1998	
Burning	2018	
Chicken Run	2000	
Class Warfare	2001	
A Clockwork Orange	1971	
La Commune (Paris, 1871)	2000	
Comrades	1986	
The Dark Knight Rises	2012	
Dawn of the Dead	1978	
District 9	2009	
Enola Holmes 2	2022	
Escape from L.A.	1996	
Escape from New York	1981	
Fantastic Beasts: The Secrets of Dumbledore	2022	
Fight Club	1999	
F.I.S.T.	1978	
The Florida Project	2017	
Gattaca	1997	
Germinal	1913	
Germinal	1963	
Germinal	1993	
The Grapes of Wrath	1940	
The Great Dictator	1940	
Guerrilla Girl	2005	
Harlan County, USA	1976	
Harlan County War	2000	
Harry Potter and the Deathly Hallows – Part 1	2010	
Harry Potter and the Half-Blood Prince	2009	
Harry Potter and the Order of the Phoenix	2007	
Hemet, or the Landlady Don't Drink Tea	2023	
Hoffa	1992	
The Hour of the Furnaces	1968	
The Hunger Games	2012	
The Hunger Games: Catching Fire	2013	
The Hunger Games: Mockingjay — Part 1	2014	
The Hunger Games: Mockingjay — Part 2	2015	
The Hunt	2020	
Hustlers	2019	
Ikiru	1952	
I'm a Cyborg, But That's OK	2006	
I'm All Right Jack	1959	
The Immigrant	1917	
I'm No Longer Here	2019	
An Inspector Calls	1954	
In Time	2011	
Intolerance	1916	
Joker	2019	
Kadaver	2020	
Kalashnikov	2020	
Katips	2021	
The Killing Floor	1984	
Land and Freedom	1995	
Land of the Dead	2005	
Last Exit to Brooklyn	1989	
Lawn Dogs	1997	
Libertad	2021	
Libertarias	1996	
The Loneliness of the Long Distance Runner	1962	
The Machinist	2004	
Made in Dagenham	2010	
Mad Max	1979	
Mad Max 2: The Road Warrior	1981	
Mad Max: Fury Road	2015	
Malcolm X	1972	
Malcolm X	1992	
Man of Iron	1981	
The Man Who Defended Gavrilo Princip	2014	
Matewan	1987	
Metropolis	1927	
Modern Times	1936	
The Molly Maguires	1970	
Newsies	1992	
Nineteen Eighty-Four	1984	
Norma Rae	1979	
The Organizer	1963	
Pan's Labyrinth	2006	
Parasite	2019	
Persepolis	2007	
The Platform	2019	
Pride	2014	
Red Lion	1969	
Revolution Selfie	2017	
Reds	1981	
Salt of the Earth	1954	
The Seduction of Mimi	1972	
Selma	2014	
Scenes from the Class Struggle in Portugal	1977	
Shark Tale	2004	
Snowpiercer	2013	
Society	1989	
Sometimes a Great Notion	1971	
Songbird	2020	
Sorry to Bother You	2018	
Space Jam	1996	
Spirited Away	2001	
Squaring the Circle	1984	
Star Wars The Last Jedi	2017	
Strange Days	1995	
Strike	1925	
Summer in the Golden Valley	2003	
Swept Away	1974	
Taxi Driver	1976	
They Live	1988	
Those Who Make Tomorrow	1946	
Three Faces West	1940	
Tout Va Bien	1972	
The Travelling Players	1975	
Us	2019	
The U.S. vs. John Lennon	2006	
V for Vendetta	2005	
Winstanley	1975	
The Working Class Goes to Heaven	1971	
Wicked	2024	
Xquipi' Guie'dani	2018	
The Young Karl Marx	2017	

== See also ==
- List of films on imperialism
- List of films about revolution
- List of films featuring colonialism
- List of films featuring slavery
