= El Cimarrón =

El Cimarron can be:

- El Cimarrón (Henze), a 1970 musical composition by Hans Werner Henze
- El Cimarrón (film), a 2007 film
