= List of films featuring slavery =

Film has been the most influential medium in the presentation of the history of slavery to the general public. The American film industry has had a complex relationship with slavery, and until recent decades often avoided the topic. Films such as The Birth of a Nation (1915) and Gone with the Wind (1939) became controversial because they gave a favorable depiction and helped shift the Lost Cause Myth into a mainstream idea. In 1940, The Santa Fe Trail gave a strong condemnation of abolitionist John Brown's attacks on slavery. As the American civil rights movement developed in the 1950s, Hollywood made defiant slaves into heroes.

Most Hollywood films used American settings, although Spartacus (1960) dealt with an actual slave revolt in the Roman Empire known as the Third Servile War. It failed, and all the rebels were executed, but their spirit lived on according to the film. The Last Supper (La última cena in Spanish) was a 1976 film directed by Cuban Tomás Gutiérrez Alea about the teaching of Christianity to slaves in Cuba and emphasizes the role of ritual and revolt. The 1969 film Burn! takes place on the imaginary Portuguese island of Queimada (where the locals speak Spanish) and merges historical events that took place in Brazil, Cuba, Santo Domingo, Jamaica, and elsewhere.

== List of films ==
The following dramatic and documentary films featuring slavery are listed alphabetically. (For movies portraying penal labour see the list linked from here.)

Film	Year	Description
12 Years a Slave	2013	The film is based on the true story of Solomon Northup, a free black man who was kidnapped in Washington, D.C. in 1841 and sold into slavery.
13th	2016	Documentary on the Thirteenth Amendment to the United States Constitution that allowed for slavery to continue for convicted prisoners.
500 Years Later	2005	Documentary covering the onset of slavery, colonialism subsequent, and how Africans are still struggling for basic freedom.
Abe Lincoln in Illinois	1940	The early life of Abraham Lincoln and his rise to becoming president.
Abraham Lincoln	1930	A biopic of Abraham Lincoln and his role as president during the American Civil War.
Abraham Lincoln: Vampire Hunter	2012	An action horror film in which Lincoln hunts slave owners that also feed on their slaves.
Aadujeevitham	2023	Survival drama about an Indian Malayali migrant enslaved in a farm in Saudi Arabia.
The Adventures of Huckleberry Finn	1939	Mark Twain's title character befriends and takes a raft down the Mississippi River with Jim, an escaped slave hoping to win his freedom. Later films of the book were also made in 1960, 1973 (Soviet Union film Hopelessly Lost), 1974, 1975, 1976 (Japanese anime series), and 1993.
Aferim!	2015	Tragic adventure comedy telling the story of a bounty hunter in pursuit of a Romani slave in 1835 Wallachia.
Aguirre, the Wrath of God	1972	Set in the year 1560, Gonzalo Pizarro and a band of Spanish conquistadors as well as enslaved indigenous people, venture into the jungle in search of El Dorado.
Alex Haley's Queen	1993	Based on the life of Queen Jackson Haley, Alex Haley's paternal grandmother.
Amazing Grace	2006	Amazing Grace is a biographical movie about the Abolitionist William Wilberforce's campaign against the slave trade in the British Empire, and features the role of John Newton, the writer of the hymn Amazing Grace, in Wilberforce's campaign.
Amistad	1997	In 1839, a slave revolt takes place on the Spanish ship La Amistad which is heading to Cuba. Two white survivors are ordered to navigate the ship back to Africa, but navigate the ship to the United States instead. The slaves then have to fight for their freedom in court, where they are eventually defended by ex-U.S. president John Quincy Adams.
Antebellum	2020	A modern-day African-American woman must escape from a 19th-century Southern US slave plantation.
The Arena	1974	In the ancient Roman city of Brundisium, a group of slave girls are forced to become gladiators.
A Respectable Trade	1998	A four-part TV miniseries based on a historical novel.
Ashanti	1979	Using modern-day slave-trading and set in Africa, a white doctor goes on a journey to find his wife who was mistaken for a native woman and kidnapped by slave traders while swimming. Getting no help from the police or the local authorities, the doctor gets a lead and tracks his missing wife across the country with a couple of allies.
Band of Angels	1957	Love story set around the US Civil War in which a plantation owner with a past raises a black slave as his son and buys a posh mixed-race slave girl.
The Barbarians	1987	A sword-and-sorcery saga following twin siblings who are enslaved at a young age and embark on a perilous journey seeking freedom and revenge.
Battlefield Earth	2000	In this film, humanity has been enslaved by a race known as the Psychlos.
Being Human	1994	Follows a single human soul through multiple lifetimes in human history, including as a slave in Ancient Rome.
Belle	2013	Story of Dido Elizabeth Belle, a mixed-race child of a British Royal Navy Officer, and her involvement in the legal case of the Zong massacre.
Beloved	1998	A former slave experiences flashbacks to her past as a slave.
Ben-Hur	1925, 1959 & 2016	A first century Jewish prince is forced to become a galley slave.
The Birth of a Nation	1915	An American film that depicts African Americans in a negative light and glorified the Ku Klux Klan.
The Birth of a Nation	2016	Nat Turner, a former slave in America, leads a liberation movement in 1831 to free African Americans in Virginia that results in a violent retaliation from whites.
The Book of Negroes	2015	A Canadian television series based on the book of the same name.
Boy Slaves	1939	An exposé of child labor. Children entrapped in peonage strike for better food, try to alert the government, but fail in these attempts.
Brother Future	1991	Brother Future is a science fiction movie. A street kid from Detroit, Michigan, is hit by a car, and when he awakens, he finds himself a slave in South Carolina in 1822. The boy then has to help his fellow slaves so that he can return to his own time.
Burn!	1969	An agent provocateur is sent to the fictional island of Queimada, a Portuguese colony in the Caribbean to replace the Portuguese administration by a formally sovereign state controlled by white latifundists friendly to Great Britain. To realize this project, the agent persuades the black slaves to fight for their liberation from slavery.
Caribbean Gold	1952	
Cloud Atlas	2012	Plotlines involving escapes from historical and futuristic forms of slavery
Cobra Verde	1987	A film about a fictional Brazilian slave overseer and trader in the era prior to Brazil's abolition of slavery. The film depicts both slavery in Brazil and the slave trade in West Africa.
C.S.A.: The Confederate States of America	2004	A faux British documentary of today reviewing American history, operating under the counter-historical premise that the Confederate States of America won the American Civil War, annexed all of the United States in the process, and thereby preserved and expanded slavery throughout the nation.
Descendant	2022	The story behind Africatown in Alabama, and the descendants of the last known enslaved Africans brought to the United States aboard the Clotilda.
Django Unchained	2012	In the American South in 1858, a black slave is purchased by a German dentist turned bounty hunter, and then agrees to help him track down a small group of outlaw plantation overseers in exchange for his freedom and the rescuing of his wife from a cruel plantation owner.
Doutor Gama	2021	The history of the Brazilian Luís Gama: a man who illegally was sold off to be enslaved as a 10 year old by his own father to pay his debts in gambling and, after he takes his freedom as a 17 year old, he grows up to be an autodidact lawyer who defended the slaves who wanted their freedom or who were enslaved despise the law.
Drum	1976	The film, a sequel to Mandingo, features a black slave who falls in love with a plantation owner's daughter. When the owner threatens castration, the slave plans a revolt.
Ebirah, Horror of the Deep	1966	This Godzilla film depicts a terrorist organization that has enslaved the inhabitants of Infant Island to manufacture heavy water.
El Cimarron	2007	Based on the life of Marcos Xiorro who conspired and planned a slave revolt in Puerto Rico in 1821.
Emancipation	2022	A slave, played by Will Smith, escapes a plantation in 1860. Based on the real life story of Gordon.
Emperor	2020	Based on the true story of Shields Green, an African American slave who escaped and participated in abolitionist John Brown's raid on Harpers Ferry.
Enslavement: The True Story of Fanny Kemble	2000	The film depicts the story of British actress and abolitionist Fanny Kemble, who becomes horrified by the treatment of her husband's enslaved people. Fanny later publishes her journals and their first-hand accounts of slavery, helping influence the British government's decision to withhold support of the Confederacy during the American Civil War.
Escrava Isaura	1976	Brazilian television miniseries set in the 1860s.
Exodus: Gods and Kings	2014	This film is inspired by the biblical episode of The Exodus of the Hebrews from Egypt led by Moses and related in the Book of Exodus.
Exterminate All the Brutes	2021	The four-part series follows colonization and multiple genocides, and the effect of both, alongside imperialism, Eurocentrism, and white supremacy.
The Foxes of Harrow	1947	Covering approximately the years 1827–1837, an illegitimate son of an Irish aristocratic family comes to America. He is a gambler and scoundrel who acquires a large plantation with many slaves, and builds an empire in antebellum New Orleans. The movie was the first based upon a book written by an African-American writer.
Free State of Jones	2016	Disenchanted confederate soldiers rally with runaway slaves to establish an abolitionist colony in Mississippi, led by Newton Knight, who fathers a child with a black woman. That story is framed by the one of his great-grandsons, who is prosecuted in 1948 for attempting to marry a white woman while possibly being of mixed descent.
Frederick Douglass and the White Negro	2008	A documentary telling the story of ex-slave, abolitionist, writer and politician Frederick Douglass and his escape to Ireland from America in the 1840s.
Freedom	2014	In the United States in the 1850s, a black man attempts to free his family from a tobacco plantation.
Ganga Zumba	1963	Not released until 1972 because of a military coup in Brazil, the film highlights Ganga Zumba, a 17th-century slave revolutionary.
Gemini Man	2019	Led by a ruthless director played by Clive Owen, GEMINI's goal was to engineer the "ultimate soldiers" by creating clones of a former Marine Scout Sniper turned Defense Clandestine Service Operative played by Will Smith who are bred to be loyal and lack all emotions and ability to feel pain.
Gladiator	2000	A Roman general in the 2nd century A.D. is turned into a slave who must fight for his life, and his country, as a gladiator.
Glory	1989	During the American Civil War, an escaped slave joins an all-black fighting unit of the Union Army.
Godzilla x Kong: The New Empire	2024	The main antagonist is a great ape of Kong's species known as the Skar King who, alongside an army of likewise red painted ape guards, enslaves a colony of apes to mine for earthly materials.
Gold Coast	2015	A Danish botanist was dispatched to Africa in 1836 meets the brutality of the Danish slave trade.
Goodbye Uncle Tom	1971	Addio Zio Tom is a pseudo-documentary in which the filmmakers go back in time and visit antebellum America, using period documents to examine, in graphic detail, the racist ideology (including the Curse of Ham) and degrading conditions by enslaved African Americans.
Gone with the Wind	1939	The film features a slave nursemaid as a prominent supporting character. Actress Hattie McDaniel won Best Supporting Actress, becoming the first African American woman to win an Academy Award.
Harriet	2019	Based on the true story of Harriet Tubman, who escaped from slavery then worked to free hundreds more.
The Horse Soldiers	1959	Follows a fictionalized Union cavalry raid in which a plantation mistress and slave are taken captive to maintain secrecy.
A House Divided: Denmark Vesey's Rebellion	1982	A 1982 television film about Denmark Vesey, a literate skilled carpenter and former slave who planned a slave rebellion in 1822 in Charleston, South Carolina.
I Am Slave	2010	A U.K. television story of one woman's fight for freedom from modern-day slavery, based on the experience of Mende Nazer, a British author, human rights activist, and a former slave in Sudan.
Ill Gotten Gains	1997	Independent film about the Atlantic slave trade
Indiana Jones and the Temple of Doom	1984	In the film, enslaved children are forced to mine for Sankara stones.
Jefferson in Paris	1995	The film shows the relationship between Thomas Jefferson, who was one of the Founding Fathers of the United States and a slave owner, and Sally Hemings, a biracial slave.
Joseph	1995	The biblical story of Joseph and his brothers. Joseph is an Egyptian slave who earns a reputation as an interpreter of dreams.
Joseph and the Amazing Technicolor Dreamcoat	1999	Joseph's biblical story portrayed in a musical by Andrew Lloyd Webber, starred Donny Osmond as Joseph.
Joseph: Beloved Son, Rejected Slave, Exalted Ruler	2015	Joseph's biblical story portrayed in an animated, religious drama.
Joseph: King of Dreams	2000	The Biblical story of Joseph portrayed in an animated musical.
The Journey of August King	1995	A widowed farmer reluctantly provides safe passage to a run-away slave as he returns home from an annual trip to purchase provisions and supplies, starring Jason Patric as August King and Thandie Newton as Annalees.
The Keeping Room	2014	The film takes place during the American Civil War. Three women in the South have to protect their home against soldiers of the Union Army.
K.G.F: Chapter 1	2018	A Kannada movie based on a True story of a gold mine in Kolar and its slaves
Kuruvi	2008	
The Autobiography of Miss Jane Pittman	1974	American television film based on the novel of the same name by Ernest J. Gaines.
The Last Supper	1976	A plantation owner during Spanish colonial times recreates the last supper using slaves, in order to teach them about Christianity.
The Legend of Nigger Charley	1972	The blaxploitation film takes place in America in the Antebellum South. It follows three slaves seeking their freedom.
The Legend of Tarzan	2016	George Washington Williams convinces Tarzan (John Clayton III, the Earl of Greystoke) to travel back to Africa to investigate claims of an ongoing slave trade.
Lincoln	2012	Near the end of the American Civil War, President Abraham Lincoln pushes to abolish slavery in the U.S. by urging Congress to pass the Thirteenth Amendment to the United States Constitution.
The Littlest Rebel	1935	
Logan	2017	Led by the cruel CEO played by Richard E. Grant and the cruel head of security played by Boyd Holbrook, Transigen's goal was to control mutant-kind by impregnanting Mexican woman with the DNA of male Mutants or cloning them to make artificial Mutants and treating them as things instead of people.
Manderlay	2005	Set in the early 1930s, the film tells the story of Grace, an idealist who attempts to oust the owners of a plantation in Alabama and free the slaves living there.
Mandinga	1976	Italian film inspired by Mandingo.
Mandingo	1975	A Black slave owner insists that his son, who is sleeping with the slaves, marry a white woman and father him a son. He marries, and trains a Mandingo slave to be a bare-knuckle fighter.
Motherland	2010	Documentary sequel to 500 Years Later, the film gives an overview of the history of the African continent and its people from Ancient Egypt to the present.
Nat Turner: A Troublesome Property	2003	Documentary film about Nat Turner
Nightjohn	1996	A young slave girl, Sarny, is taught to read by John, a slave who has given up freedom in the Northern United States in order to teach slaves how to read.
North and South	1985–1994	A three-part TV miniseries outlining the period leading to and during the American civil war, and the post-war Reconstruction.
The North Star	2016	The film is based on "the true story of Big Ben Jones, a slave who escaped from a Southern plantation in 1848 and is helped by local Quakers".
Passage du milieu	1999	Docudrama about a trans-Atlantic slave ship voyage of black slaves from the West Coast of Africa to the Caribbean, a part of the triangular slave trade route called the Middle Passage.
Playdate	2025	A Colonel played by Hiro Kanagawa and an eccentric billionaire played by Alan Tudyk planned to make clones of a disgraced former Delta Force soldier played by Alan Ritchson who are designed to be tireless and skilled but emotionless supersoldiers incapable of PTSD or moral hesitation.
Paradesi	2013	A Tamil language movie that is based on true events that took place in a tea plantation during the 1930s.
Pompeii	2014	A Celtic tribe is massacred by Roman soldiers and the sole surviving child is captured for slavery. He grows up to become a gladiator, played by Kit Harington, and is taken to Pompeii prior to the eruption of Mount Vesuvius.
Prince Among Slaves	2006	A PBS historical documentary about the life of Abdul Rahman Ibrahima Sori, a prince from West Africa who was made a slave in the United States and freed 40 years later on orders of the American president, John Quincy Adams.
The Prince of Egypt	1998	Former Prince Moses frees the Hebrew slaves from the Pharaoh of Egypt.
The Quest for Freedom	1992	The life of escaped slave and abolitionist Harriet Tubman
Quilombo	1984	Account of Quilombo dos Palmares, a 17th-century Brazilian community of escaped slaves. Features its one-time leader, Zumbi.
Raiders of the Seven Seas	1953	
The Retrieval	2013	During the American Civil War, a young free boy is sent north by his bounty hunter gang to retrieve a wanted fugitive slave.
Rio 2096: A Story of Love and Fury (Portuguese: Uma História de Amor e Fúria)	2013	A Brazilian animated drama film following important moments in Brazil's history, including slavery.
Roots	1977	An acclaimed eight-episode TV mini-series based on Alex Haley's biography about his family moving from slavery to liberation.
Roots	2016	A four-episode remake of the 1977 miniseries.
Roots: The Gift	1988	A film portraying events occurring between the second and third episodes of the first miniseries.
Sankofa	1993	In the supernatural film, an African American model travels to Ghana and is transported back in time by a local mystic. The model finds herself a slave in the past.
Santa Fe Trail	1940	Western centered around abolitionist John Brown, his attacks on slavery as a prelude to the Civil War, and the attempt to find his hideout and stop his violent campaign.
Savannah	2013	Loosely based on the book Ducks, Dogs and Friends, the film is about a white hunter who befriends a freed slave.
Seven Angry Men	1955	Follows John Brown's campaign to end slavery and his raid on Harper's Ferry.
The Slave Hunters	2010	Slave hunter goes after an escaped General-turned-slave in this South Korean 24-episode television series.
Slaves	1969	Follows the life of two slaves in the American South of the 1850s.
Slavers	1977	Two competing slave traders fight between each other for the monopoly on the slave trade.
Slavery and the Making of America	2005	American slavery history including slavery during the American Civil War.
Slavery by Another Name	2012	Adaptation of the book into a 90-minute documentary film.
Skin Game	1971	American independent comedy western
Solomon Northup's Odyssey	1984	The film is based on the true story of Solomon Northup, a free black man who was kidnapped in Washington, DC in 1841 and sold into slavery.
Spartacus	1960, 2004, 2010-2013	In Spartacus, a film that stays close to the historical record, a Thracian enslaved as a gladiator by the Roman Republic leads a slave revolt that engulfs much of the Italian peninsula. The Netflix series Roman Empire has an episode on Caesar and his war against Spartacus in Season 2 episode 1.
Star Wars: Episode I – The Phantom Menace	1999	Anakin Skywalker and his mother are slaves on Tatooine and the former is freed by the Jedi after winning a podracing competition.
Star Wars: Episode II – Attack of the Clones	2002	The Clone Troopers are living beings who were created just to serve in a war and with little regard for them as people by the Kaminoans.
Stealing a Nation	2004	Recounts the experiences of the people of the Chagos Islands in the Indian Ocean by the establishment of an American military base. Video
Star Wars: Episode III – Revenge of the Sith	2005	The Clone Troopers are living beings who were created just to serve in a war and with little regard for them as people by the Kaminoans.
Tamango	1958	A slave ship crosses the Atlantic, and the slaves rebel. A film by Hollywood blacklisted director John Berry starring Dorothy Dandridge and Curd Jürgens.
The Ten Commandments	1923 & 1956	Biblical story of the life of Moses, an adopted Egyptian prince who becomes the deliverer of his real brethren, the enslaved Hebrews.
Toussaint Louverture	2012	French language film based on the life of Toussaint Louverture, leader of the Haitian emancipation revolution.
Tula: The Revolt	2013	In 1795 on Curaçao, then a Dutch colony, a slave uprising takes place.
The Viking	1928	Lord Alwin is captured in a Viking raid and taken to Norway as a slave.
Unchained Memories	2003	An HBO documentary featuring the stories of former slaves interviewed during the 1930s as part of the Federal Writers' Project. It compiles slave narratives which are narrated by actors emulating the original conversation with the interviewer.
Uncle Tom's Cabin	1903	Many film adaptations of Harriet Beecher Stowe's 1852 novel have been made, nine from the silent era (including those of 1910, 1918, and 1927), and a German version in 1965.
Unrepentant: Kevin Annett and Canada's Genocide	2007	Film about the residential school state system in Canada and its impact on indigenous peoples.
Utopia	2013	A documentary film about Indigenous Australians and the impact of settler colonialism on them. Video
Welcome II the Terrordome	1995	A British dystopian science fiction–drama film that follows the interactions of a black family and supporting characters reincarnated from the Igbo Landing to a fictional modern ghetto.
A Woman Called Moses	1978	A miniseries about the life and career of the African American abolitionist and slave escape leader, Harriet Tubman.
A Woman Captured	2017	A documentary about a woman who is kept as domestic slave in Europe.
Yambaó	1956	Mexican film about the life of Yambaó, a young mulatta with supposed black magic powers who fell in love with the master of a sugar cane plantation in Cuba in 1850. Starring the Mexican Rumberas film star Ninón Sevilla.
Zama	2017	The film is set in the late 18th century in a remote South American colony under the Spanish Empire, and portrays the period's "naturalness of slavery".

== See also ==
- Underground (2016 TV series)
- Blaxploitation and Slavesploitation
- List of blaxploitation films
- List of films about revolution
- List of films featuring colonialism
- List of films on imperialism
- List of films that depict class struggle
- Rosewood (film), 1997 film by John Singleton
