= Van Lierop =

Van Lierop is a Dutch toponymic surname meaning "from Lierop", a town in North Brabant. People with this name include:

- Nikkie van Lierop (born 1963), German pop singer and synthesizer player
- Robert Van Lierop (born 1939), American lawyer, film director, diplomat, activist and writer
- Tonny van Lierop (1910–1982), Dutch field hockey player
- Lennart van Lierop (born 1994), Dutch rower
