= Pedro Telemaco =

Puerto Rican actor, model and comedian

- Born: October 13, 1968 (age 57); San Juan, Puerto Rico
- Years active: 1980–present

Pedro Telemaco (born October 13, 1968) is a Puerto Rican actor, model and comedian. He is a native of San Juan.

== Early years ==
Telemaco started acting at a very young age, participating in theater plays by the time he was thirteen. Telemaco made his television debut in a telenovela named La Verdadera Eva (The Real Eva). In 1983, Telemaco acted alongside Juan Ferrara in channel 2's acclaimed telenovela, Laura Guzman, Culpable! (Laura Guzman, Guilty!).

== Acting career ==
Telemaco was a drama student at the University of Puerto Rico, where he kept acting in theater. At the time, heavy rumors about Telemaco becoming the first Black actor to star in a Puerto Rican telenovela surfaced in such publications as Vea, Teve Guía and other Puerto Rican gossip magazines. Telemaco was close to achieve this goal; he was chosen to star in a mini-series instead: 1988's Color de Piel (Skin Color) explored racial stereotypes in Puerto Rican society. The mini series was shown on Super Siete and gave Telemaco the opportunity of acting alongside Ruth Fernández, Rafael Jose and Nydia Caro, among others.

Later that year, Telemaco moved to WAPA-TV, where he acted as a comedian in El Show del Mediodia (The Midday Show), a variety show hosted by Luisito Vigoreaux. Being at WAPA-TV allowed Telemaco to act alongside Ivonne Coll; the pair were featured in "Cuqui", a sitcom that Coll starred in. He recorded some television and cinema commercials, and, in 1989, he acted in five theater plays, including two musicals: Clemente, about Puerto Rican baseball star Roberto Clemente and where he acted together with Carmen Belen Richardson, and a Puerto Rican version of Annie.

Telemaco made his Hollywood debut later that year, having a minor role in a low budget movie, Cat Chaser.

Telemaco moved to Spain in 1991 to pursue a modeling career. He also performed as an exotic dancer and released a music CD, Date Vida (Give Yourself Life). Telemaco acted in some theater plays there, becoming popular among Spaniard play critics. While in Spain, he furthered his studies in drama and began preparing for a future Hollywood career by taking English classes. In 1992, he starred in a short film, Sabria que Vendrias (I Knew you'd Come), with Carmen Manzano as his co-star.

In 1997, Telemaco moved to Miami, Florida. In the United States, Telemaco participated in two Hispanic television telenovelas, the play in English & Spanish: "The Valiant" (1998) directed by Venezuelan producer and director Raphael Ojeda, among other theater productions.

Telemaco returned to Puerto Rico in 2001, to act in En Pelotas...Una Comedia sin Pantalones, a play which was a Puerto Rican version of The Full Monty. In 2003, Telemaco played "Safio" in the made-for-television film, Bala Perdida (Stray Bullet).

That same year, Telemaco got his second opportunity in Hollywood, when he played a Cuban man in Bad Boys II, which starred Will Smith and Martin Lawrence.

In 2004 Telemaco filmed El Cimarrón, a movie about slavery in 19th century Puerto Rico. He plays the role of Marcos Xiorro, a slave who planned a slave uprising in 1821. The movie was released in early 2007. In 2007 he also played the 16th century Peruvian saint St. Martin de Porres in the movie Fray Martin de Porres.

He plays Osvaldo in Telemundo's 2010 telenovela, El Clon. In 2011, he made special appearance in Aurora.

In 2015, he played an investigator who discovers the crimes committed by a criminal psychologist on a television series, on Univision, called Demente criminal.

== Filmography ==
Year	Title	Role	Notes
1989	Cat Chaser	Clerk	
2003	Bad Boys II	Baseball Cap Cuban	
2003	Bala perdida	Safio	
2006	El cimarrón		
2008	Che	Eligio Mendoza	
2008	La mala	Jabao	

== See also ==
- List of Puerto Ricans
