= Cape Verde, My Love =

2007 Franco–Cape Verdean film

- Portuguese: Cabo Verde nha cretcheu
- Directed by: Ana Lúcia Ramos Lisboa
- Written by: Ana Lúcia Ramos Lisboa
- Starring: Neusa Cardoso; Eric Bridges Twahirwa; Olivia García; Isabel Fontes; Cleophas Kabasita
- Cinematography: Octávio Espírito Santo
- Music by: Theophilus Chantre
- Distributed by: Brava Florida; Paris-Barcelone Films; TCV; Cinemate
- Release date: 25 May 2007 (France)
- Running time: 77 minutes
- Countries: Portugal; France; Cape Verde
- Language: Portuguese

Cape Verde, My Love (Portuguese: Cabo Verde nha cretcheu) is a 2007 Franco–Cape Verdean drama film directed by Ana Lúcia Ramos Lisboa. The film stars Neusa Cardoso and Eric Bridges Twahirwa in lead role along with Olivia García, Isabel Fontes and Cleophas Kabasita in supportive roles.

The film received critical acclaim.

== Cast ==
- Neusa Cardoso as Bela
- Olivia García as Laura
- Isabel Fontes as Flavia
- Carla da Silvia as Natalia
- Antonio Teixeira as Chico
- Abel Monteiro as Valdomar
- Eric Bridges Twahirwa
- Cleophas Kabasita
- Davis Kagenza
