= Héroes de otra patria =

1998 film by Iván Dariel Ortíz

Héroes de Otra Patria
- Film poster
- Directed by: Iván Dariel Ortíz
- Written by: Iván Dariel Ortíz
- Produced by: Iván Gonzalo Ortíz
- Starring: Jorge Castillo; Jimmy Navarro; Alba Raquel Barros; Adamari López
- Release date: 1998
- Running time: 90 minutes
- Country: Puerto Rico
- Languages: Spanish; English

Héroes de Otra Patria (in English, Heroes from Another Country, or sometimes credited as Heroes without a Cause) is a 1998 Puerto Rican film, written and directed by Iván Dariel Ortíz. The film was selected as the Puerto Rican entry for the Best Foreign Language Film at the 71st Academy Awards, but was not accepted as a nominee.

The film follows the lives of two Puerto Rican soldiers in the middle of the Vietnam War. After being sent on a reconnaissance mission, their squad is ambushed and they get lost in the jungle. Meanwhile, we see the struggles being suffered by their relatives after their departure from the island.

== Cast ==
- Jorge Castillo as Carlos
- Jimmy Navarro as Raúl
- Alba Raquel Barros as Doña Pura
- Adamari López as Esther
- Domingo Quiñones as Sgt. Miller
- Néstor Rodulfo as John

== Awards ==
The film received an honorary mention at the Viña del Mar Festival in Chile.

== See also ==
- Cinema of Puerto Rico
- List of films set in Puerto Rico
- List of Puerto Ricans in the Academy Awards
- List of submissions to the 71st Academy Awards for Best Foreign Language Film
- List of Puerto Rican submissions for the Academy Award for Best Foreign Language Film
