= Colonial cinema =

Cinema produced by the colonizing nation in and about their colonies

Colonial cinema is cinema produced by a colonizing nation in and about their colonies. While typically seen as a Western phenomenon, non-Western countries, most notably Imperial Japan, also had colonial cinemas. Colonial films typically idealize life in the colonies by emphasizing the modernizing aspects of colonization. Feature films set in colonial settings typically represent them as refuges for colonizers looking to escape life in the metropole. As a result, colonial films frequently do not attempt to reflect the social realities of life in colonized countries. Representations of local characters, places, and customs are regularly presented as escapist, apologetic or overtly racist. Today colonial cinema is an important source to understand the mentality of the colonizing societies.

== Bibliography ==
- Baskett, Michael (2008). The Attractive Empire: Transnational Film Culture in Imperial Japan. Honolulu: University of Hawai'i Press. ISBN 978-0-8248-3223-0.
- Boulanger, Pierre, Le cinéma colonial de "l'Atlantide" à "Lawrence d'Arabie", préf. de Guy Hennebelle, Paris : Seghers, 1975
- Slavin, David Henry, Colonial cinema and imperial France, 1919-1939: white blind spots, male fantasies, settler myths, Baltimore : Johns Hopkins University Press, 2001.

== See also ==
- List of films featuring colonialism
