= Fernando Fernández (distiller) =

Puerto Rican businessman

- Born: 1850; Bayamón, Puerto Rico
- Died: 1940 (aged 89–90)
- Occupations: industrialist, and sportsman

Notes
- The Fernández family set a barrel of rum aside, which is stored in the "cellar", with orders that it should only be opened when Puerto Rico becomes a free and independent nation.

Fernando Fernández (c.1850–1940) was the founder of the oldest rum producing company in Puerto Rico.

== Start of a dynasty ==
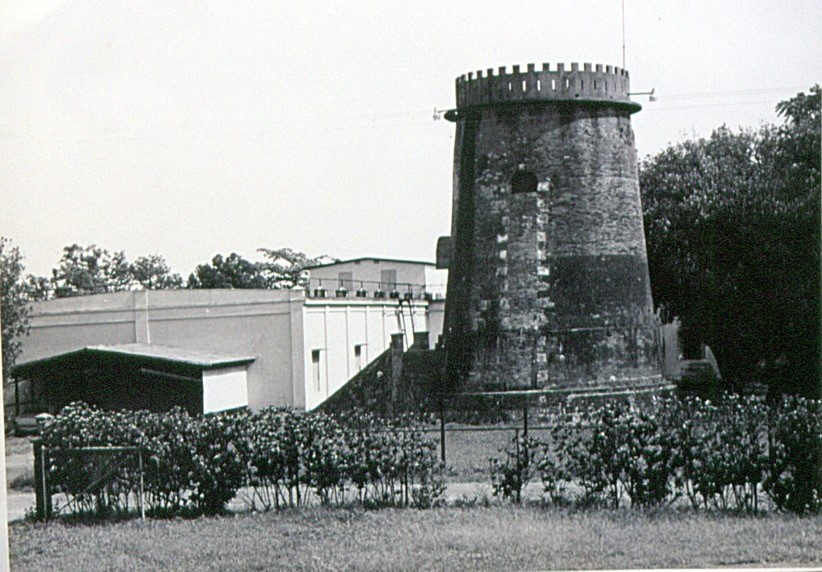
Tower at Hacienda Santa Ana

Fernández, was born in Bayamon, Puerto Rico. He was the owner of the Santa Ana plantation located in the city of his birth. The Santa Ana plantation is located on land which was granted to his grandfather (whose name was also Fernando Fernández) by the Spanish Royal Crown in 1797. Fernández's grandfather was a naval captain who fought against pirates and English merchant ships. The Spanish Royal Crown granted him this land in recognition of his service to Spain, here he planted sugarcane and raised cattle.

In 1804, the elder Fernández used a mixture of sugar and honey to process and distill rum. He aged his product in special barrels which were imported from Europe. The rum he produced was only for his own personal use and that of his family.

In 1821, various slaves from his plantation were involved in a conspiracy. A slave from another plantation by the name of Marcos Xiorro planned and organized a revolt against the slave masters. The plans of the revolt were discovered by the Spanish authorities and never took place.

In 1827, he ordered his 127 slaves to build an enormous windmill shaped like a tower. The windmill helped to extract the juice from the sugarcane. He would still resort to the use of manpower whenever the wind wasn't strong enough to operate the windmill.

In 1846, Fernández's father, Manuel Fernández (birth name: Manuel Fernández y Martínez), inherited the plantation; Manuel Fernández developed the land which consisted of over 2,400 acres (970 ha). Manuel Fernández eventually purchased much of the property adjoining his land and soon became the richest man in Bayamon.

== Pedro Fernando Fernández takes charge ==
In 1880, Pedro F. Fernández, became the owner of the plantation. Fernández imported a still from Europe and started to produce rum using the sugar and honey from his land. He developed two different formulas for his rums and he used the same barrels as his grandfather, believing that the rum's unique flavor would be contained in these barrels.

Soon the word spread about Fernandez's rum and many friends and nearby families would visit the Santa Ana Hacienda to "sample" the rum. His son went to France to continue his university education; while there he discovered cognac. Upon returning to Puerto Rico, he developed a rum recipe that rivaled the best French cognacs. People started calling Fernando's rum "Ron del Barrilito" (Rum from the little Barrel). In Puerto Rico, families began switching from "brandy" and "cognac", to "Ron del Barrilito". Fernández also produced "Alcoholado Santa Ana" which is a product derived from alcohol and eucalyptus leaves and is greenish in color. Unlike pure alcohol, Alcoholado Santa Ana does not sting. It is principally used for rub-downs and to refresh the body.

== Edmundo B. Fernández, Inc. ==
Fernando Fernández died in 1940 in Bayamon. His great-grandson, who is also named Fernando Fernández, organized the company (which is now called "Edmundo B. Fernández, Inc.") and continues to distribute two brands of "Ron del Barrilito" and "Alcholado Santa Ana" worldwide. The company's main offices are still located in the Hacienda Santa Ana with manufacturing facilities in Puerto Rico and in the Dominican Republic. Edmundo Fernández's office is located in the windmill tower built by his ancestor.

== Freedom barrel ==
In 1942, a single barrel, which is stored in the "cellar", was put aside with orders that it should only be opened when Puerto Rico becomes a free and independent nation. When and if that ever happens, the cask (barrel) will be taken to the town square in the center of Bayamon and its contents will be offered free to all those who wish to drink from it.

== See also ==
- List of Puerto Rican rums
- List of Puerto Ricans
- José Ramon Fernández (businessman)
