= Ana Lúcia Ramos Lisboa =

- Born: Furna
- Occupation: Film director

Ana Lúcia Ramos Lisboa is a film director from Cape Verde.

Born in Furna, Brava, Cape Verde, she studied at the Conservatory of Music, Dakar, Senegal, the National Institute for Dramatic Arts, Abidjan, and earned a film degree in Paris. Her film debut was as director, producer, screenwriter, and actress of the short film La Peur (1996). She directed the documentary Amílcar Cabral (2001), about the pan-Africanist leader Amilcar Cabral, which in addition to examining the life and myth of Cabral, it has also been described as "a celebration of Lisboa’s birthplace, subtly highlighting the foundational principles of Africa’s most stable democracy through the figure of Cabral. Its cinematography revels in the stark beauty of Cabo Verde." She directed two feature films: Cabo Verde nha cretcheu ("Cape Verde, My Love", 2007) and Zeka Santiago (2017).

== Filmography ==
- La Peur (1996), short.
- Amílcar Cabral (2001)
- Cabo Verde nha cretcheu ("Cape Verde, My Love", 2007)
- Zeka Santiago (2017).
