= Iván Dariel Ortiz =

Puerto Rican film director

- Born: Puerto Rico

Iván Dariel Ortiz is a Puerto Rican film director. Ortiz began studies at the University of Sagrado Corazón in San Juan, Puerto Rico. Afterwards, he traveled to Maine in the United States to train in the field of cinematography. He then became a camera assistant, an editor, and then a producer of publishing agencies.

After gaining experience in various fields of film production, he directed a short film titled Héroes de Otra Patria about two Puerto Ricans fighting at the Vietnam War. With this film he won the award of best short film at the San Juan Cinemafest. He then turned the short film into a complete feature film of the same title, even representing Puerto Rico for a nomination at the 1999 Academy Awards.

Despite not being nominated, the film was selected by the Lincoln Center Film Society in New York City as one of the best Latin American films. It also received an honorary mention at the Viña del Mar festival in Chile.

In March 2007, Ortiz released a feature film entitled El Cimarrón about an African slave during 19th century Puerto Rico.

Aside of his career as a film director, Ortiz has served as a director of TV commercials and music videos.

== See also ==
- Cinema of Puerto Rico
- Héroes de Otra Patria
- El Cimarrón
- List of Puerto Ricans in the Academy Awards
