= China: A Century of Revolution =

Television documentary film series

- Genre: Documentary
- Written by: Sue Williams
- Directed by: Sue Williams
- Narrated by: Will Lyman
- Music by: Tan Dun (1–2); Jason Kao Hwang (3)
- Country of origin: United States
- Original language: English

Production
- Executive producer: Judith Vecchione
- Producers: Sue Williams; Kathryn Dietz
- Cinematography: Richard Gordon
- Editors: Howard Sharp (1–2); John Martin (3)
- Running time: 360 minutes
- Production company: Ambrica Productions

Original release
- Network: PBS
- Release: September 27, 1989 – July 9, 1997

China: A Century of Revolution is a series of television documentary films about the history of China in the 20th century. Produced by Ambrica Productions for PBS, the films were written and directed by Sue Williams and first aired in the United States from 1989 to 1997. The first installment, China in Revolution, 1911–1949, was broadcast on September 27, 1989. The second installment, The Mao Years, 1949–1976, was broadcast on April 13, 1994. The third installment, Born Under the Red Flag, 1976–1997, was broadcast on July 9, 1997.

Williams began production on the documentary in 1985.

== Home media ==
China was released on VHS by WinStar Home Video and Zeitgeist Films. A DVD box set for the series was later released by Zeitgeist Films and Kino Lorber on July 10, 2007.
