= List of Iranian Revolution films =

Below is an incomplete list of feature films, television films or television series which include events of the Iranian Revolution. This list does not include documentaries, short films.

== 1980s ==
Year	Country	Main title (Alternative title)	Original title (Original script)	Director	Subject
1980	Iran	Long Live...!	زنده‌باد…	Khosrow Sinai	Drama, Thriller.
1980	Iran	Rain of Blood	خون‌بارش	Amir Ghavidel	
1982	Iran	Destiny's 5th Rider	پنجمین سوار سرنوشت	Saeed Motalebi	Crime, Drama.
1983	United States; West Germany	The Mission	فرستاده	Parviz Sayyad	Drama.
1983	Iran	Soil and Blood	خاک و خون	Kamran Qadakchian	Action.
1985	Iran	The Ceremonies	تشریفات	Mehdi Fakhimzadeh	Crime.
1986	Iran	The Execution	تیرباران	Ali Asghar Shadravan	Action, Biography, Crime. Seyed Ali Andarzgoo
1987	Iran	The Convicts	محکومین	Nasser Mohammadi	Crime.
1988	Iran	The Red Line	خط قرمز	Masoud Kimiai	Drama, Thriller.
1989	Iran	O Iran	ای ایران	Nasser Taghvai	Comedy, Drama, Family, Music.
1989	Iran	The Secret of Kowkab	راز کوکب	Kazem Ma'asoumi	

== 2000s ==
Year	Country	Main title (Alternative title)	Original title (Original script)	Director	Subject
2001	Iran	The Hidden Half	نيمه پنهان	Tahmineh Milani	Drama.
2002	United States	Maryam		Ramin Serry	Drama.
2007	France; United States	Persepolis		Marjane Satrapi; Vincent Paronnaud	Animation, Biography, Drama, History, War.

== 2010s ==
Year	Country	Main title (Alternative title)	Original title (Original script)	Director	Subject
2011	Iran	Private Life	زندگی خصوصی	Hossein FarahBakhsh	Drama, Thriller.
2012	Iraq; Turkey; Iran	Rhino Season	فصل کرگدن	Bahman Ghobadi	Drama, Thriller.
2012	United Kingdom; United States	Argo		Ben Affleck	Biography, Drama, History, Thriller. Based on memoir The Master of Disguise and the article The Great Escape: How the CIA Used a Fake Sci-Fi Flick to Rescue Americans from Tehran. Tony Mendez, Canadian Caper
2015	United States	Septembers of Shiraz		Wayne Blair	Drama, History, Thriller. Based on the novel The Septembers of Shiraz.
2015	France	All Three of Us	Nous trois ou rien	Kheiron	Comedy, Drama.
2017	Iran	Confiscation	مصادره	Mehran Ahmadi	Comedy, Drama.
2017	United States	Price for Freedom		Dylan Bank	Drama. Based on an unknown book.
2019	Germany; Spain	Tomorrow We Are Free	Morgen sind wir frei	Hossein Pourseifi	Drama, History.

== 2020s ==
Year	Country	Main title (Alternative title)	Original title (Original script)	Director	Subject
2020	Iran	Careless Crime	جنایت بی‌دقت	Shahram Mokri	Crime, Drama. Cinema Rex fire
2022	Israel	Iran 3	איראן 3	Ariel Cohen	Action, Drama.
2025	Iran	Taxidermy	تاکسیدرمی	Mohammad Paydar	Comedy, Drama.

== Television films ==
Year	Country	Main title (Alternative title)	Original title (Original script)	Director	Subject
1981	Canada; United States	Escape from Iran: The Canadian Caper		Lamont Johnson	Drama, History, Thriller. Canadian Caper

== Television series ==
Year	Country	Main title (Alternative title)	Original title (Original script)	Director	Subject
1982	Iran	The first time I participated in the revolution	اولین بار که در انقلاب شرکت کردم		
1986	United States; Mexico	On Wings of Eagles		Andrew V. McLaglen	Drama. Based on the book On Wings of Eagles.
2015	Iran	Kimia	کیمیا	Javad Afshar	
2015-16	Iran	The Enigma of the Shah	معمای شاه	Mohammad Reza Varzi	History. Mohammad Reza Pahlavi
