= Marcos Xiorro =

19th-century Puerto Rican slave leader

- Born: Africa
- Occupations: House slave, Slave revolt leader

Notes
- Xiorro was the planner of a slave rebellion in Puerto Rico.

Marcos Xiorro was the slave name of an enslaved African in Spanish Puerto Rico who, in 1821, planned and conspired to lead a slave revolt against the sugarcane plantation owners and the Spanish Colonial government. Although his rebellion was unsuccessful, he achieved legendary status among the island's slave population and has become part of Puerto Rican folklore.

== Early years ==
It is not known when Xiorro was born or from what people and region in Africa he came from. What is known about him is that he was a Bozal slave, who had been recently brought to the Spanish colony of Puerto Rico directly from Africa. Xiorro was enslaved by Vicente Andino, a Militia Captain who owned a sugar plantation in the municipality of Bayamón.

== False rumors of freedom ==
In 1812, Salvador Meléndez Bruna, the governor of Puerto Rico, ordered that any slave who disrespected his master would be punished with fifty lashes by the civil authorities — and then returned to his master for additional punishment. A 100-lashes punishment was given to those who committed a violent act or incited a rebellion.

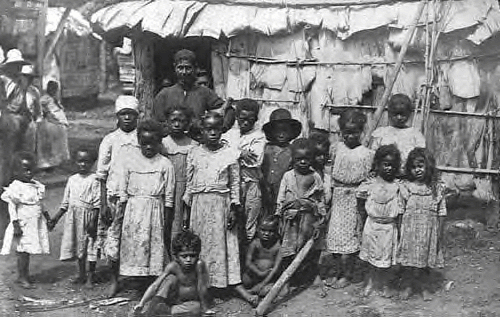
Descendants of former Puerto Rican slaves in 1898, the year the United States invaded Puerto Rico

Ramón Power y Giralt was a Puerto Rican naval hero, a captain in the Spanish navy who had risen to become president of the Spanish Courts. Power y Giralt was among the delegates who proposed that slavery be abolished in Puerto Rico. He sent a letter to his mother, Josefa Giralt, suggesting that if the proposals were approved, she should be the first one to grant her slaves their freedom.

Although these proposals were never discussed in sessions of the Spanish Courts, Josefa Giralt's slaves learned about the letter and, believing that slavery had been abolished, they spread the "news" that they were free. A slave named Benito contributed to the rumor by circulating the mistaken news that the Cortes Generales y Extraordinarias de la Nacion (General and Extraordinary Courts of the Nation) had granted slaves their freedom. These false rumors led to various confrontations between the slaves, the military and the slave masters.

== Xiorro's conspiracy ==
In July 1821, Xiorro planned and organized a conspiracy against the slave masters and the colonial government. This was to be carried out on July 27, during the religious festival celebrations dedicated to Santiago (St. James).

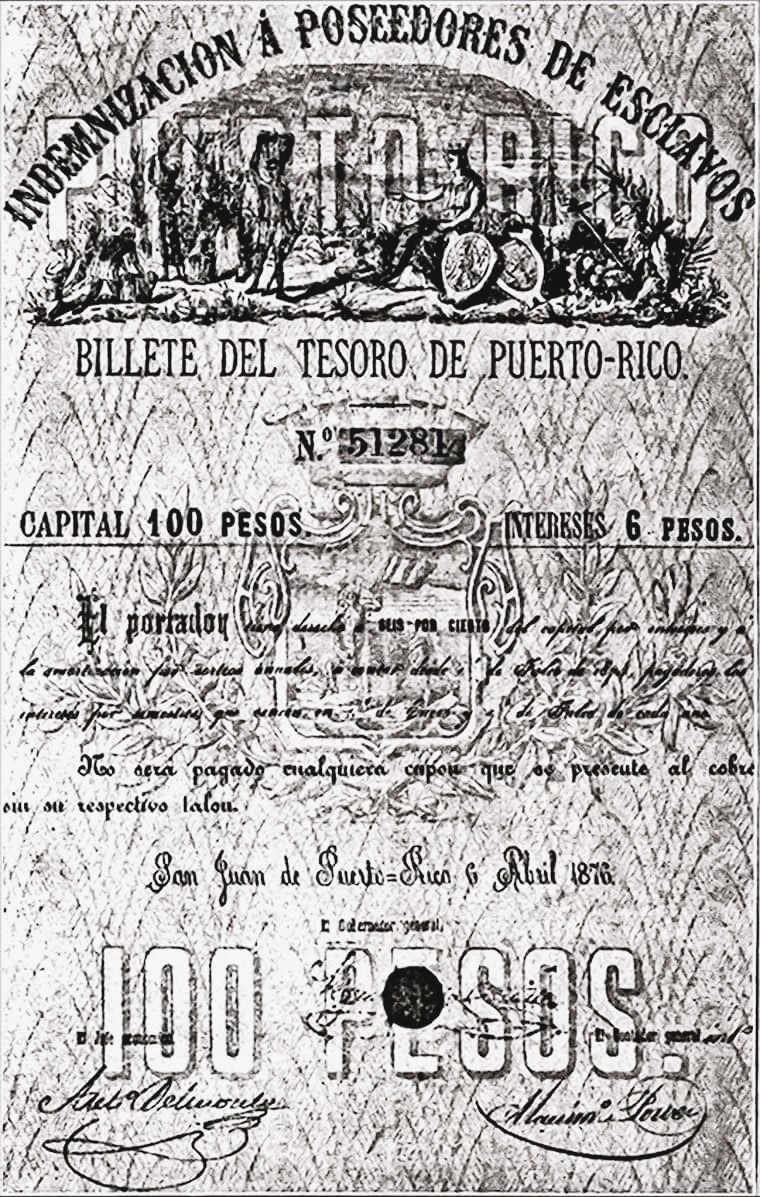
Indemnity bond paid as compensation to former owners of freed slaves

According to his plan, several slaves were to escape from various plantations in Bayamón, which included the haciendas of Angus McBean, Cornelius Kortright, Miguel Andino and Fernando Fernández. They were to proceed to the sugarcane fields of Miguel Figueres, and retrieve cutlasses and swords which had been hidden in those fields. Xiorro, together with Mario, a slave from the McBean plantation, and another slave named Narciso, would lead the slaves from Toa Baja and together with the slaves from Bayamón would capture the City of Bayamón. They would burn the city and kill all those who were Caucasians. After this, they planned to unite with slaves from the adjoining towns of Río Piedras, (Note: Rio Piedras at the time was a town and not part of San Juan) Guaynabo, and Palo Seco. With this critical mass of slaves, all armed and emboldened from a series of quick victories, they would invade the capital city of San Juan, where they would declare Xiorro their king.

=== Failure of the conspiracy ===
Miguel Figueres had a loyal slave named Ambrosio who told him about the plans for the rebellion. The whistleblower also had both personal and financial interests, as the colony rewarded slaves who reported any kind of slave conspiracy by granting them freedom and paying 500 pesos. Figueres then informed the mayor of Bayamón of the planned rebellion. The mayor proceeded to mobilize 500 soldiers for the defense of the city. They pursued the slaves, quickly capturing the ringleaders and followers of the conspiracy. A total of 61 slaves were imprisoned in Bayamón and San Juan.

=== Aftermath ===
By August 15, 1821, the court trials against the conspirators were completed. A total of 17 slaves were punished, and Mario and Narciso, considered to be ringleaders, were both executed. Xiorro was captured on August 14 in the city of Mayagüez. He was tried separately and his fate is unknown, but he was most likely executed.

The Spanish authorities believed that Jean-Pierre Boyer, the president of Haiti, which had gained independence in 1804, following a slave rebellion, contributed to Xiorro's conspiracy. In the years that followed, many of the slaves who had been imprisoned and returned to their masters later escaped from their plantations.

During the years of slavery there were other minor revolts. Some slaves even participated in El Grito de Lares, Puerto Rico's independence revolt against Spanish rule on September 23, 1868.

On March 22, 1873, slavery was finally "abolished" in Puerto Rico but with one significant caveat: the slaves were not fully emancipated — they had to buy their own freedom at whatever price was set by their current owners. In order to accomplish this, the majority of the freed slaves continued to work for their former masters for some time under a kind of indentured servitude. They received a salary for their labor and slowly purchased their freedom. The government placed a limit on this "buy-back" period and created an insular "Protector's Office" to oversee the transition. Under the new law, former slaves were to remain indentured for a maximum period of three years. After that they would go free. During that three-year period, they could work for their former masters, for other people, or for the state. Once the three-year period expired, if a slave had any remaining debt, the Protector's Office would pay it with an "indemnity bond" at the discounted value of 23% of the claimed debt.

The former slaves earned money by working as shoemakers, by cleaning clothes, or by selling the produce they were allowed to grow in the small patches of land allotted to them by their former masters.

== In film ==
In 2007, Cine del Caribe, S.A. released a film about the slave conspiracy titled El Cimarrón, starring Pedro Telemaco as Marcos Xiorro.

== See also ==
- List of Puerto Ricans
- List of Puerto Ricans of African descent
- African immigration to Puerto Rico
- List of slaves
- Ducoudray Holstein Expedition
