= Thomas Sankara: The Upright Man =

- Directed by: Robin Shuffield
- Screenplay by: Robin Shuffield
- Produced by: ZORN Production
- Cinematography: Marc Ridley, Robin Shuffield
- Edited by: Samuel Gantier, Serge Dietrich
- Music by: Cyril Orcel
- Release date: 2006
- Running time: 52 minutes
- Country: France
- Language: French

Thomas Sankara: The Upright Man (French: Thomas Sankara, l'homme intègre) is a 2006 documentary film about Thomas Sankara, the former president of Burkina Faso. Thomas Sankara, often referred to as "the African Che," Thomas Sankara, the Upright Man became an eminent figure in Africa. Sankara was elected President of Burkina Faso at the age of 34, serving from 1983 until his assassination in 1987.

The French colonizers initially named it Upper Volta, but it was later renamed Burkina Faso by Sankara. The name Burkina Faso means "Land of Upright Men." This film sheds light on the impact that Sankara and his politics had on Burkina Faso, and Africa in general.

The film recovers a detailed history of Sankara's four-year rule and his revolutionary program for African self-reliance as a defiant alternative to the neoliberal development strategies imposed on Africa by the West.
