= El cimarrón (film) =

2007 film directed by Iván Dariel Ortíz

- Film poster
- Directed by: Iván Dariel Ortíz
- Written by: Iván Gonzalo Ortíz
- Produced by: Iván Gonzalo Ortíz
- Starring: Pedro Telemaco; Fernando Allende; Dolores Pedro Torriente
- Cinematography: Jaime Costas
- Music by: José "Pepe" Ojeda
- Distributed by: IndieFlix
- Release date: 2007
- Running time: 101 minutes
- Country: Puerto Rico
- Language: Spanish

El cimarrón (transl. The fugitive) is a 2007 Puerto Rican film. It follows the lives of two African slaves brought to Puerto Rico during the era of slavery in the 19th century. It is based on the life of Marcos Xiorro who conspired and planned a slave revolt in 1821.

== Cast ==
- Pedro Telemaco - Marcos Xiorro
- Fernando Allende - Don Pablo
- Dolores Pedro Torriente - Carolina
- Teófilo Torres
- Mara Croatto - Elsa
- Gerardo Ortíz - Don Domingo
- Modesto Lacén - Jacinto
- Herman O'Neill - Military chief
- Daniela Droz - Clara
- Walter Rodríguez - Mayor
- Julio Axel Landrón - Sijo
- Julio Torresoto
- Eugenio Monclóva
- Idenisse Salamán - Isabel
- Guillermo de Cun
- Nestor Rodulfo

== Awards ==
- Academy Awards: The film was considered for the 80th Academy Awards with four other Puerto Rican films. In a vote on September 24, 2007, among members of the Puerto Rico Film Corporation, Maldeamores was selected.
- Tulipanes Latino Art & Film Festival: Best of Show (2007)

== See also ==
- Cinema of Puerto Rico
- List of films set in Puerto Rico
- List of films featuring slavery
