= Amílcar Cabral (film) =

2001 film by Ana Ramos Lisboa

- Directed by: Ana Ramos Lisboa
- Produced by: Continental Filmes
- Cinematography: José Brinco, Octávio Espírito Santo
- Edited by: Luís Sobral
- Music by: Zé Afonso
- Distributed by: Marfilmes
- Release date: 2001
- Running time: 60 minutes
- Country: Cape Verde
- Language: Portuguese

Amílcar Cabral is a documentary film directed by Ana Lúcia Ramos Lisboa about African icon and martyr Amílcar Cabral.

== Festivals ==
- 7º FACT - Festival de Cine Africano, Spain (2010)
- Africa Vive, Spain (2010)
- AFRICA50 (2010)
- The Best of the African Diaspora Film Festival (2010)
- 8th Annual Chicago African Diaspora Film Festival (2010)
- African Diaspora Film Festival, U.S.A.

== See also ==
- Cinema of Cape Verde
