= A Luta Continua (film) =

A Luta Continua (The Struggle Continues)
- Directed by: Robert Van Lierop
- Written by: Robert Van Lierop
- Cinematography: Robert Fletcher
- Release date: 1972
- Running time: 34 minutes
- Countries: Mozambique; USA

A Luta Continua (The Struggle Continues) is a documentary which depicts the FRELIMO struggle for the independence of Mozambique from Portugal.

Filmed by an African-American crew in 1971, within liberated zones of the country, the documentary has been called, "one of the most effective ... for the mobilization of international solidarity" with FRELIMO. Released in 1972 and broadcast on the US television station GBH in October 1973, the documentary links the independence struggle in Southern Africa with the civil rights and Black Power movements in the United States. It is credited with influencing strategies of African-American grassroots community organizing in the 1970s and anti-apartheid activism in the US in the 1980s. The film contains the only footage of battle recorded from the FRELIMO side of the Independence War.
