= Revolution Selfie =

2017 documentary film

- Directed by: Steven de Castro
- Produced by: Steven de Castro
- Narrated by: Steven de Castro
- Release date: December 1, 2017
- Running time: 115 minutes
- Countries: Netherlands; Philippines; United States

Revolution Selfie: The Red Battalion (also known as Revolution Selfie: Pulang Bagani) is a 2017 documentary film that follows director Steven de Castro in travelling to the Philippines to meet with the New People's Army. The film is notable for being shot almost entirely from first-person point of view in part simulated video gameplay.

== Content ==
Revolution Selfie was presents a mix of documented material featuring interviews and storytelling. It was filmed with a GoPro action camera that the filmmaker is wearing. The filmmaker meets face-to-face with members of the New People's Army, the armed wing of the Communist Party of the Philippines (CPP).

Between presenting interviews and images in a traditional documentary, the film borrows augmented reality techniques and adds adventure game design elements. De Castro philosophizes about filming as a means for the audience in picturing themselves as the star of their own movie.

De Castro said of his film, "Is it even possible to bridge the gap with people whose lives are entirely different from our own?"

Shot in the US, the Netherlands and the Philippines, it features music from singer-songwriter Danny Fabella, hiphop emcee Nejma Nefertiti, Pitoy San Jose, Potri Ranka Manis, and Ras Badjao.

== Cast ==
- Patrimunio family
- Soldiers of the Pulang Bagani battalion
- Jose Maria Sison
- Julie de Lima
- Concha Araneta
- Luis Jalandoni
- Coni Ledesma

== Release ==
Revolution Selfie: The Red Battalion had its North American premiere at the 2018 International Film Festival Manhattan in New York City and won the Best Documentary category. After screening at the 2019 Inwood Film Festival, the documentary was released on worker-owned streaming service Means TV.

== Accolades ==
| Year | Award | Category | Project | Result | Ref. |
|---|---|---|---|---|---|
| 2018 | International Film Festival Manhattan | Best Documentary | Revolution Selfie | Won | |
| 2019 | Inwood Film Festival | Best Feature Film | Revolution Selfie | Won | |
