= Robert Van Lierop =

American film director

Permanent Representative of Vanuatu to the United Nations
- In office 1981–1994

Personal details
- Born: March 29, 1939 (age 87) Harlem, New York City

Robert F. Van Lierop (born 1939) is a United States and ni-Vanuatu lawyer, diplomat, political activist, filmmaker, writer and photojournalist.

== Early life ==
Van Lierop was born in Harlem to a father from Suriname and a mother from the Virgin Islands. His paternal grandfather was from The Netherlands. He attended Stuyvesant High School, graduated from Hofstra University in 1964 and from New York University Law School in 1967.

Van Lierop began his career as a lawyer, and became a member of the National Association for the Advancement of Colored People.

== Career as filmmaker ==
Van Lierop was the director of A Luta Continua (1972) and O Povo Organizado (1975). Both films were produced in the United States, in the Portuguese language, with English subtitles. Set in Mozambique, they portray the struggles of freedom fighters against Portuguese Empire authorities, as well as the building of a new nation and the construction of schools and social facilities in the early independence era.

Josh Plaut and Patricia Blanchet of New York University have described them as "landmark films [...] which are characterized by the most progressive ideas of human and personal liberation [and which] have deeply impacted an era of Black independent cinema."

In addition to producing his own films about Mozambique, Van Lierop arranged the screening of Mozambican films in the United States in 1981, with the proceeds serving to build a hospital in Mozambique.

== Career as diplomat ==
In 1980, when the newly independent Vanuatu joined the United Nations, its Prime Minister, Walter Lini, asked Van Lierop to be its Permanent Representative at the United Nations. The two men had met when Vanuatu had been a topic of discussion at the U.N. just prior to its independence. Van Lierop accepted, and represented Vanuatu for over a decade. He was, throughout the 1980s, Vanuatu's only diplomat stationed permanently in New York City, and he visited Vanuatu twice a year on average.

As Vanuatu's ambassador, and following instructions from the ni-Vanuatu government, he campaigned within the U.N. against apartheid in South Africa, and in favour of decolonisation for East Timor, Western Sahara, West Papua and New Caledonia, among others. Van Lierop stated in 1990 that "On the issue of decolonisation, in particular for New Caledonia, Vanuatu is recognised as one of the principal promoters of independence, and this has resulted in great respect for our country".

In 1988, he was vice-president of 43rd Session of the United Nations General Assembly. In 1990, Van Lierop became the first chairman of the Alliance of Small Island States, a position which he held until 1994; he emphasised the importance of the fight against climate change, to which Small Island Developing States are particularly vulnerable. He was also chairman of the United Nations' Special Committee on Decolonization, in keeping with Vanuatu's long-standing efforts in that field. In 1998, he co-moderated a United Nations conference on human rights in the context of cultural diversity. On 8 December 2012, representing Saint Kitts and Nevis, he was elected vice-chair of the Subsidiary Body for Implementation, one of two main subsidiary bodies of the United Nations Framework Convention on Climate Change.
