= Namibia: The Struggle for Liberation =

- Directed by: Charles Burnett
- Screenplay by: Charles Burnett
- Produced by: Namibian Film Commission; Pan Afrikan Center of Namibia
- Starring: Carl Lumbly; Danny Glover; Chrisjan Appollus; Lazarus Jacobs
- Cinematography: John Njaga Demps
- Edited by: Edwin Santiago
- Music by: Stephen James Taylor
- Release date: 2007
- Running time: 161 minutes
- Countries: Namibia; United States
- Languages: English; Afrikaans; Oshiwambo; Otjiherero; German

Namibia: The Struggle for Liberation is a 2007 epic film on the Namibian independence struggle against South African occupation as seen through the life of Sam Nujoma, the leader of the South West Africa People's Organisation and the first president of the Republic of Namibia. The film was written and directed by Charles Burnett and stars Carl Lumbly and Danny Glover. The Namibian government financed the production. Music composed by Stephen James Taylor won the award for Best African Film at the Kuala Lumpur International Film Festival.

The film also won for Best Music Score and Best Director.

The film's dialogue is in English, Afrikaans, Oshiwambo, Otjiherero, and German.

== Plot ==
Carl Lumbly plays Namibian freedom fighter and first president Sam Nujoma. Joel Haikali was used for Sam Nujoma's early years. Danny Glover plays the priest Elias, who becomes Sam Nujoma's friend throughout the film.

PLOT SUMMARY

The narrative follows young Sam Nujoma as he leaves his rural home to seek a better life in the city, where he becomes involved in the liberation movement. The film depicts the harsh realities faced by Namibians under apartheid, the formation of SWAPO, and the eventual armed struggle that led to Namibia's independence in 1990.

== Production ==
The production cost of NAD 100 million, approximately US$15 million, was covered by the Pan-African Centre of Namibia. The languages of the film are English (the main language), Afrikaans, Oshiwambo, Otjiherero, and German. The dialogues were dubbed in English, all other languages were translated using subtitles.

== Publication ==
The film was shown at the Festival de Cine Africano Córdoba in 2008. In Germany, the film was released on DVD on March 19, 2010, as Namibia - The Fight for Freedom, and in France on February 14, 2012, as Namibia.
