= Casbah of Algiers =

Old town area of Algiers, Algeria

UNESCO World Heritage Site
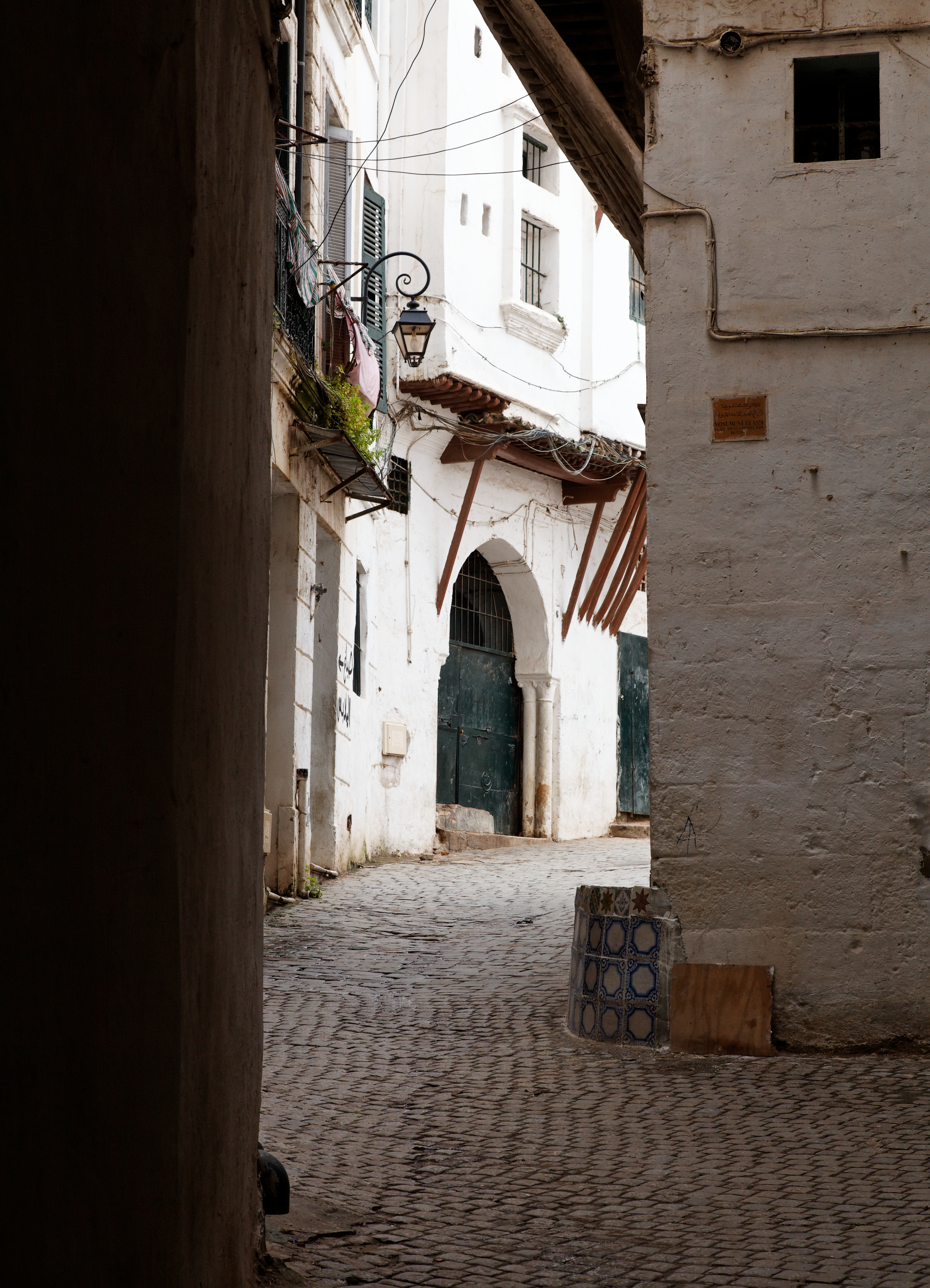
- Alley of the Casbah

- Location within Algiers
- Location: Algeria
- Criteria: (ii) (v)
- Reference: 565
- Coordinates: 36°47′13″N 3°03′38″E

The Casbah of Algiers, commonly referred to as the Casbah (Arabic: القصبة, Al-qaṣabah, meaning "citadel"), corresponds to the old town or medina of Algiers, founded in 944 by the Zirids. It is a historic district that has been listed as a UNESCO World Heritage Site since 1992. Administratively, it is located within the municipality of Casbah, in the province of Algiers.

Likely inhabited since the Neolithic period, as were various sites in the Algiers Sahel, the first mentions of the city date back to Antiquity, when it was initially a Phoenician port, later becoming Berber and eventually Roman. The current urban framework was designed in the 10th century by the Berbers under the Zirid dynasty, later enriched by contributions from other Berber dynasties that successively ruled the central Maghreb. The Casbah reached its peak during the period of the Regency of Algiers, serving as the seat of political power. Colonized by the French in 1830, it was gradually marginalized as power centers shifted to the new city. During the Algerian War, the Casbah played a crucial role, as a stronghold for FLN independence fighters. After Algeria gained independence in 1962, the Casbah did not reclaim its former central role and remained a marginalized city area.

An example of Islamic architecture and urban planning characteristic of Arab-Berber medinas, the Casbah is also a symbol of Algerian culture, a source of artistic inspiration, and home to an ancestral artisanal heritage. Local actors continue to fight to preserve and sustain its tangible and intangible heritage.

== Etymology ==
More generally, a kasbah is the walled citadel of many North African cities and towns. The name made its way into English from French in the late 19th century (the Oxford English Dictionary states 1895), and can be spelled "kasbah" or "casbah".

== Geography ==
=== Toponymy ===
The Casbah of Algiers takes its name from the citadel that overlooks it (designated in Arabic as القصبة, Al-Kasbah). Originally, the term "Casbah" referred to the highest point of the medina—the old city—of the Zirid era. Over time, it came to designate the entire medina, which was enclosed by the ramparts built during the Regency of Algiers in the 16th century.

=== Location and topography ===
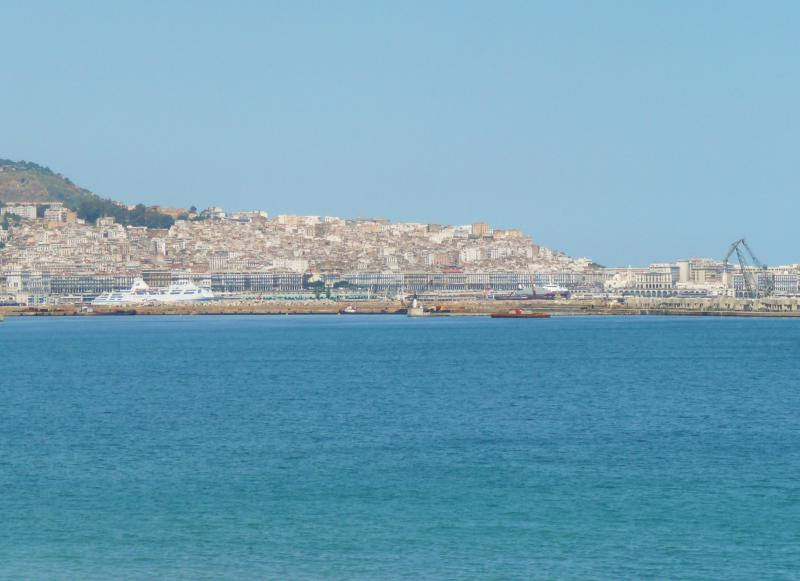
View of the Kasbah with the Bouzeréah massif in the background.

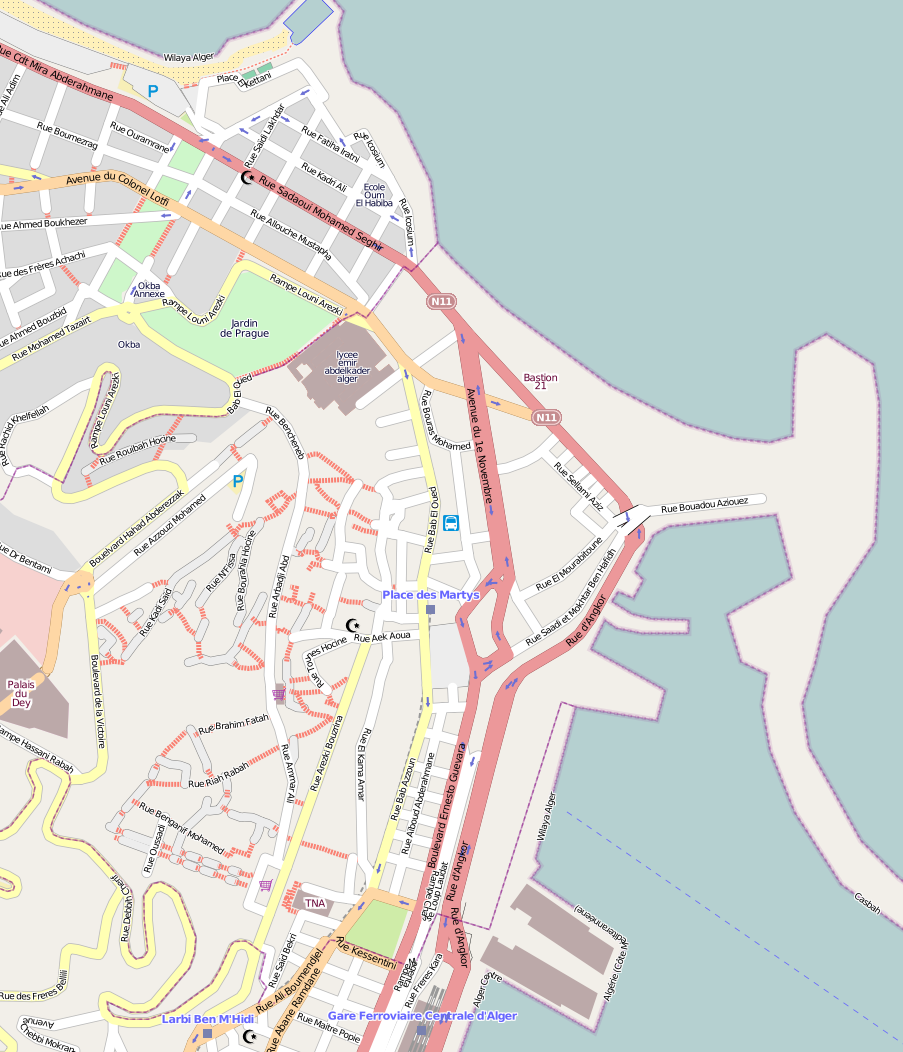
Plan of the Kasbah.

The Casbah is located at the center of Algiers and forms its historic core. The city has historically occupied a strategic position, as its geographical location is central within Algeria and the Maghreb. Facing the Mediterranean Sea, it is built on terrain with a 118-meter elevation difference. At first glance, the Casbah appears as a cluster of houses built on a slope. The narrow and winding streets make it a car-free zone, where supply deliveries and waste collection are still traditionally done using donkeys. The district forms a triangular shape, with its base meeting the Bay of Algiers, giving it, when viewed from the sea, the appearance of a "colossal pyramid" or a "triangular amphitheater". The whiteness of its houses and their arrangement have inspired poetic descriptions from writers who liken Algiers to a "sphinx". The citadel, overlooking the medina, gives it the appearance of a "well-guarded city", earning it the Arabic nickname El Djazaïr El Mahroussa ("Algiers the Protected"). This reputation extended to Europe, where the memory of Charles V's failed invasion in 1541 persisted until the French landing in 1830.

The site's occupation dates back to the Punic era, with the earliest known trace dating from the late 6th century BCE. At that time, the Carthaginians sought to establish a network of trading posts along the southern Mediterranean coast to control commercial flows, including gold from sub-Saharan Africa, silver from Spain, and tin from the Cassiterides Islands. This system, known as "Punic scales," provided sailors with sheltered stopovers where they could trade goods. The site of Algiers, then called Ikosim, featured small islands suitable for mooring and served as a relay between two Punic settlements, Bordj el Bahri (Rusguniae) and Tipaza, spaced 80 kilometers apart.

The location was protected by the Bab-el-Oued coastline on one side and by Agha Bay on the other, which was exposed to north and east winds and contained four small islands near the shore. (Note: These islets are now integrated into the port jetty.) On the coast, a 250-meter promontory provided refuge. The Bouzaréah massif supplied limestone for construction, while the surrounding area provided clay for bricks and access to fresh water. The city's port function was later confirmed by the Cordoban geographer Al-Bakri in the 11th century, who described Algiers as being protected by a harbor, islands, and a bay, making it a winter anchorage point. Throughout history, the site served not only as a refuge for commercial ships but also as a haven for pirates and corsairs.

=== Hinterland ===
The Bouzaréah massif, reaching an altitude of 400 meters, is part of the Algiers Sahel, which extends into the Mitidja plain and, further south, the Atlas Mountains, making Algiers an important outlet. This hinterland contributed to the city's wealth through agricultural production, including livestock farming and beekeeping. Since the Middle Ages, the city has been characterized by the presence of agricultural landowners, a strong commercial tradition, and its status as a major Mediterranean port, exporting various local products. This economic prosperity attracted numerous conquerors who successively ruled the Maghreb. Algiers is also located on the outskirts of Kabylia and, starting in the 16th century, became the primary destination for migrants from the region, surpassing Béjaïa, another major city in the central Maghreb. As a result, Algiers drew not only Kabylian agricultural products but also its labor force.

=== Hydrogeology ===
Water for the old medina comes from the Algiers Sahel and the groundwater of Hamma, Hydra, and Ben Aknoun. It was originally transported through a network of aqueducts dating from the Regency of Algiers, which remains in place but has been replaced by a modern distribution system developed in the early 20th century.

During the Regency of Algiers, the Casbah was supplied by four main aqueducts, some of which remained functional until the early 20th century. These aqueducts sourced water from nearby areas, including the Sahel, Telemly, Hamma, Hydra, and Bitraria. Groundwater was drawn using norias (water wheels) and collected in reservoirs to increase the aqueducts' flow. A system of filtering galleries also helped capture minor water veins. After passing through the aqueducts, the water was stored in reservoirs at the city's gates, from where it was distributed via pipelines to various fountains. The aqueducts were built between 1518 and 1620 and ran through the Fahs (Note: Fahs refers to the immediate surroundings of Algiers, outside the walls of the medina.) (the rural outskirts) to supply the medina. They did not rely solely on gravitational flow but employed the souterazi (siphon towers) technique. This method involved directing water through an elevated pillar, which, although it appeared to slow the flow, offered key advantages: releasing air pressure, balancing water levels across different channels, and ensuring relative control over the flow rate. This souterazi technique was also used in Constantinople and in some cities of Spain and the Maghreb.

The water sources originate from an area with limestone outcrops, gneiss, and granulite veins resting on a schist base. In addition to aqueducts and fountains, domestic wells—ranging from 50 to 70 meters deep and drilled into gneiss or schist layers—further contributed to the Casbah's water supply.

== History ==
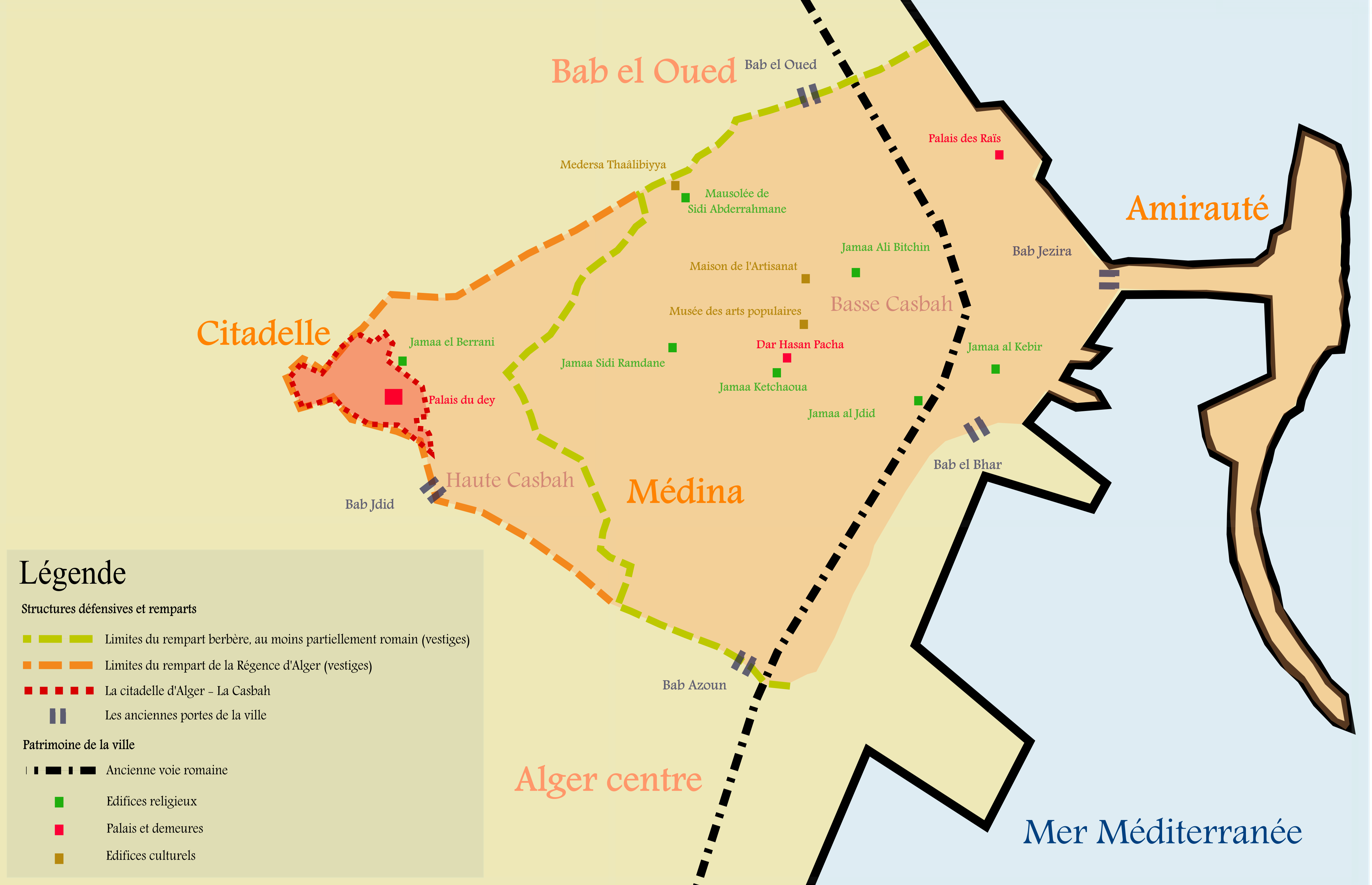
The Kasbah of Algiers and various historical sites.

The Casbah of Algiers is an ancient medina with millennia-old origins, taking into account the site's Punic and Roman past. (Note: According to Marcel Le Glay, cited by Kassab 2010, p. 1, Punic coins have been discovered in the Lower Casbah.) It is considered a cultural asset of global importance due to its ancient heritage and the history it embodies.

=== Prehistory ===
There are no traces of prehistoric settlement in the Casbah itself. However, given evidence of prehistoric habitation in the immediate surroundings (the Algiers Sahel), it is likely that such traces were simply obscured by the site's long-standing, dense, and continuous urbanization, and that it too was inhabited as early as the Neolithic period.

=== The Punic, Numidian and Roman Antiquity ===
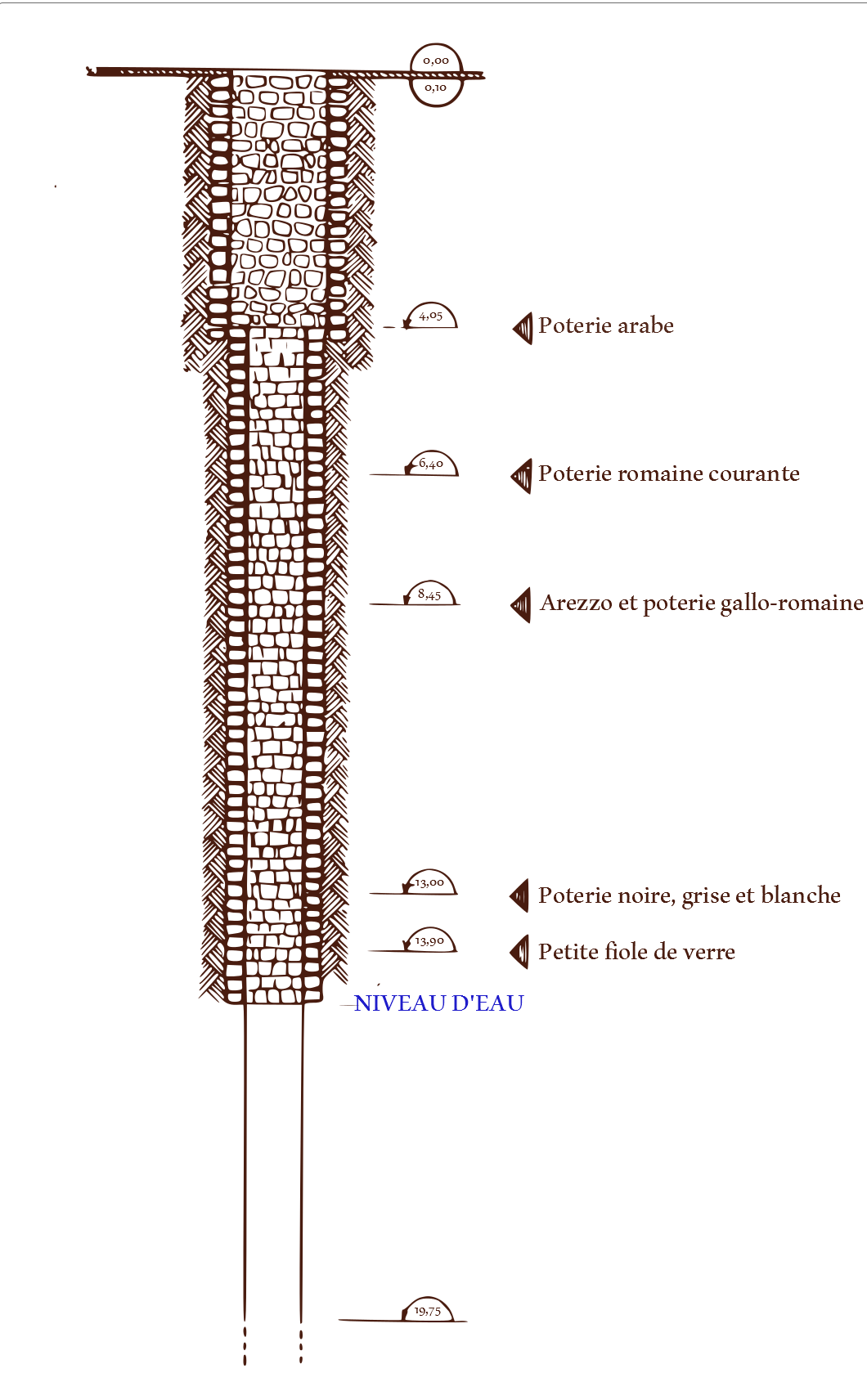
Diagram of the ancient well of the lower Kasbah.

The exact date of the Phoenician establishment of ancient Algiers (Ikosim) remains uncertain, but it likely occurred after the late 6th century BCE. It appears that two ports were founded in the Bay of Algiers: Rusguniae (Bordj El Bahri) in the east, which provided shelter from westerly winds, and Ikosim (Algiers) in the west, which protected from easterly winds. From this period, a Punic stele was discovered on Rue du Vieux Palais in Algiers, along with a stone sarcophagus found in 1868 in the Marengo Garden containing period jewelry, and numerous coins in the Marine district.

These 158 Punic lead and bronze coins, dating from the 2nd to 1st century BCE, bear the inscription "IKOSIM," confirming the ancient name of Algiers, which had previously been assumed but unproven. According to Cantineau, the Punic etymology of Ikosim derives from two combined words: i, meaning "island", and kosim, meaning "owl" or alternatively "thorn". Thus, the ancient name of Algiers, Ikosim, translates to either "Island of Owls" or "Island of Thorns." Victor Bérard, supported by Carcopino, preferred the translation "Island of Seagulls." An ancient well was also discovered in the Marine district, containing pottery fragments from various periods. Other remains from antiquity indicate trade relations with the northern Mediterranean (Gaul, Spain, southern Italy) from the 3rd to 1st century BCE and, later, Roman presence until the 5th century CE. (Note: The first archaeological layer, deeper than 13 meters, revealed pottery from the 3rd to the 1st century BCE, some of which were Campanian-style, indicating trade relations with southern Italy, Greek colonies in Gaul, and possibly the eastern coast of Spain and Gaul. The second layer, between 13 meters and 8.45 meters, contained red pottery from Arezzo or Gallo-Roman types. Finally, the third layer, between 8.45 meters and 6.40 meters, contained only Roman pottery, increasingly coarse and undecorated, likely dating from the 3rd, 4th, and 5th centuries CE.)

The fall of Carthage in 146 BCE did not bring significant changes for Ikosim, which became part of the Numidian kingdom and later fell under the influence of the Mauri kingdom ruled by King Bocchus and his successors. Mauretania, which corresponds to this western part of North Africa, remained independent until 40 CE, when, after a period of rule by vassal kings such as Ptolemy of Mauretania, it came under the domination of the Roman Empire. The name Ikosim was Latinized into Icosium, and Roman settlers began arriving as early as the period of the vassal kings, even before the Roman conquest. As a result, the city saw the early establishment of Roman magistrates, as evidenced by an honorary Latin inscription dedicated to King Ptolemy, discovered on Hadj Omar Street in the Casbah. Another inscription referring to Ptolemy is found on a slab within the minaret of the Great Mosque.

By 40 CE, the Mauritanian kingdom was reduced to a Roman province under Emperor Caligula. Icosium was administered by a procurator-governor based in Caesarea (modern-day Cherchell). Emperor Vespasian later granted Icosium Latin rights, elevating it to the status of a Roman city, though with fewer privileges than full Roman colonies.

The city's ancient walls likely defined an area similar to that occupied during the Ottoman Regency of Algiers, though habitation was concentrated near the coast, with steeper slopes probably used as gardens. Above the densely populated lower city, the higher ground likely housed residential districts, all surrounded by rural villas. Various Roman-era remains discovered around the Casbah site indicate the layout of an ancient road leading toward the Belouizdad district.

The ancient necropolises, located outside the city in accordance with Roman customs, provide an even more refined indication of the perimeter of the city of Icosium. The discovered tombs indicate that burials were located to the north and northwest of the city, a historical constant observed during the Berber and Turkish periods, and continuing to this day with the Saint-Eugène cemetery. This cemetery is notable for being two kilometers away from the Casbah, whereas cemeteries were traditionally placed directly beneath city walls.

It is difficult to trace the axes of the ancient city due to numerous alterations in the urban fabric. However, the lower Casbah was partially replaced by a modern colonial-era city that follows the layouts and axes already established in antiquity.

Little is known about the city's economic life, which was likely centered around its port.

Religious life was initially dedicated to the Roman pantheon. At an undetermined date, the city became Christian, with several Donatist and Catholic bishops. Remains from this period were discovered during excavations in the 2000s, linked to the construction of the Algiers metro and the redevelopment of Place des Martyrs. Among the findings was a Roman basilica adorned with mosaics, whose central space spanned nearly 10 meters, likely dating back to the 3rd or 4th century, as well as a Byzantine-era necropolis.

There is little information about the following centuries, except for the sacking of the city by Firmus in 371 or 372. The ancient history of Icosium then fades into that of the province of Mauretania and later the Byzantine domination, until the founding of the present-day medina—El Djazaïr Beni Mezghana—by Bologhin Ibn Ziri in 960, marking a new chapter in the city's history.

=== The Zirid period and Central Maghreb under Berber dynasties ===
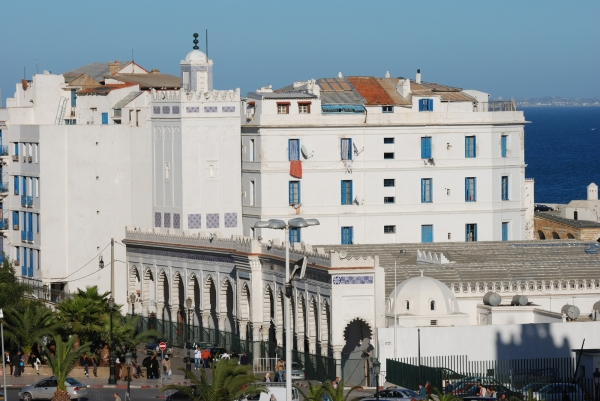
The Grand Mosque, Jamaa El Kebir, built in the era of the Almoravids.

The Casbah corresponds to the old city of Algiers, the medina, built by Bologhin Ibn Ziri in 960 on the ruins of the ancient Roman city of Icosium, in the territory of the Berber tribe of the Beni Mezghenna. This 10th-century foundation appears confirmed by the fact that no authors from the Arab conquest period mention it, and it is only in the 10th century that Eastern writers begin to reference it. The name given by Bologhin Ibn Ziri is believed to be a reference to the islands that once faced Algiers' port and were later attached to its current jetty. In Arabic, Al-Djaza’ir (الجزائر) means "The Islets." Other hypotheses, notably by the Andalusian scholar Al-Bakri, suggest that the correct name is the one preserved in the city's oral tradition—Dzeyer—which would be a tribute to Ziri, the city's founder. To this day, Algiers' inhabitants refer to themselves as Dziri.

Ibn Hawkal, a Baghdad-based merchant, described the city in the 10th century:

The city of Algiers is built on a gulf and surrounded by a wall. It contains many bazaars and a few sources of fresh water near the sea, from which the inhabitants draw their drinking water. In the city's outskirts, there are vast fields and mountains inhabited by several Berber tribes. The inhabitants' main wealth consists of herds of cattle and sheep grazing in the mountains. Algiers produces so much honey that it becomes an export commodity, and the quantities of butter, figs, and other goods are so great that they are exported to Kairouan and beyond.

From the 10th to the 16th century, according to Louis Leschi, Algiers was a Berber city surrounded by Berber tribes who practiced cereal farming in the Mitidja or livestock herding in the Atlas, generating significant revenue through trade. Around 985, Al-Muqaddasi visited the city and echoed Ibn Hawkal's observations. Al-Bakri later highlighted Algiers' rich ancient heritage, noting the presence of a dār al-mal‛ab (theater or amphitheater), mosaics, and church ruins. He also mentioned many souks (leswak) and a large mosque (masgid al-ǧāmi). He described the port as well-sheltered and frequented by sailors from Ifriqiya, Spain, and "other countries".

Algiers fell under Almoravid control in 1082 when their ruler, Yusuf Ibn Tashfin, built the Great Mosque of Algiers (Jamaa el Kebir). In 1151, Abd al-Mumin, a Zenata Berber from Nedroma, took Algiers from the Almoravids and became the Almohad caliph, ruling over the entire Maghreb and Andalusia.

In the 14th century, the Arab tribe of the Tha'alaba established a local stronghold around the city, forming a local magistrate dynasty known as a "bourgeois senate". Al-Djazaïr survived by remaining a vassal state to the Zianids of Tlemcen, who built the minaret of the Great Mosque, the Hafsids of Tunis, and the Marinids of Fez, who constructed the Bou Inania madrasa.

However, Algiers' growing piracy activity led Ferdinand of Aragon, following the Reconquista, to seize and fortify the islet in front of the city (the Peñón) to neutralize it. Seeking to free the city from Spanish control, Salim at-Toumi, Algiers' leader, called upon Aruj Barbarossa. This marked the beginning of the Regency of Algiers, during which the city became the capital of the Central Maghreb.

=== The regency of Algiers ===
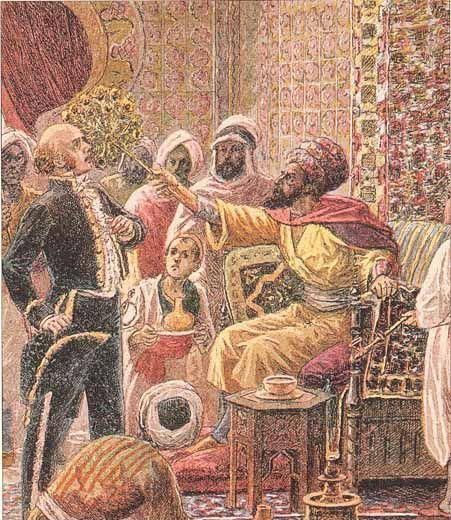
The Dey Hussein in his palace in the Casbah and the famous "fan blow" scene. On April 30, 1827, the dey blew his fan at the French consul. This was one of the causes of tension between the two countries, which led, three years later in 1830, to the capture of Algiers.

The Barbarossa brothers permanently expelled the Spanish from the Peñón islet in 1529. Aruj Barbarossa then decided to establish a real port by connecting the islet to the mainland, creating Algiers' jetty and admiralty, as well as a harbor for ships. These developments allowed the city to become the primary base for corsairs in the western Mediterranean. Algiers became the capital of its regency, and the term Al Jazâ'ir was used in international documents to refer to both the city and the territory it controlled. (Note: French historians Ahmed Koulakssis and Gilbert Meynier note that "the same term, in international documents, is used to designate both the city and the country it governs: Al Jazâ’ir." Gilbert Meynier further explains that "even though the path to establishing a state on the ruins of the Zayyanid and Hafsid states was fraught with obstacles, from then on, people would speak of dawla al-Jaza’ir (the power-state of Algiers). This period saw the establishment of a political and administrative organization that contributed to the formation of the Algerian entity: watan al-Jazâ'ir (the land of Algeria) and the definition of borders with neighboring entities to the east and west.") Charles V launched the Algiers expedition in 1541, but it failed. In response, the city's defenses were reinforced, especially along the coast. Algiers was enclosed by a fortified wall with gates such as Bab Azoun, Bab El Oued, Bab J'did, and Bab Dzira, and was protected by a series of forts built between the 16th and 17th centuries: Lefanar, Goumen, Ras el Moul, Setti Taklit, Zoubia, Moulay Hasan (renamed Fort l’Empereur after the French occupation), Qama’at El Foul, and Mers Debban. Later, the Bordj J'did (1774), as well as the Lebhar and Ma-Bin forts in the early 19th century, were constructed.

The fortress overlooking the city was built between 1516 (started by Aruj Barbarossa) and 1592 (completed under Kheder Pasha). However, the Regency's rulers initially governed from the Djenina Palace, known locally as dar soltan el kedim, which was demolished during the colonial period. It only became the ruler's residence in 1817 under Ali-Khodja, the second-to-last dey of Algiers. Seeking to escape the tyranny of the militia, he abandoned the centrally located Djenina Palace and transferred the public treasury to the Casbah, where he barricaded himself with a personal guard of 2,000 Kabyles.

Apart from agricultural and manufactured products, the city derives its income from the corso: the "Barbary piracy." Slavery is also practiced, mainly for domestic work, and there is a significant presence of European captives. These captives, whose living conditions are relatively mild when ransom is possible, endure a much harsher existence when they are employed in the galleys. The government, or beylik, collects a portion of the revenues from maritime raids in the Mediterranean. These revenues help finance the militia and fund public works (such as the sewage system and aqueducts). The corsairs, called reïs, and the notable figures of the beylik build luxurious residences in the lower part of the city, while Arab families primarily settle in the upper part. The golden age of piracy in the 17th century leads to a series of European expeditions, in the form of bombardments of the city. It also faces earthquakes (1716 and 1755) and plague epidemics (1740, 1752, 1787, and 1817). These factors, combined with economic decline and political instability, cause the city's population to shrink. From over 100,000 inhabitants in the 17th century, the population drops to around 30,000 by 1830.

On April 30, 1827, the Casbah witnesses the famous "fan incident," which serves as a pretext for the French conquest of Algiers on July 5, 1830, during the reign of Charles X. Its last occupant is Dey Hussein. Count and Marshal de Bourmont resides there in July 1830 after the city's capture.

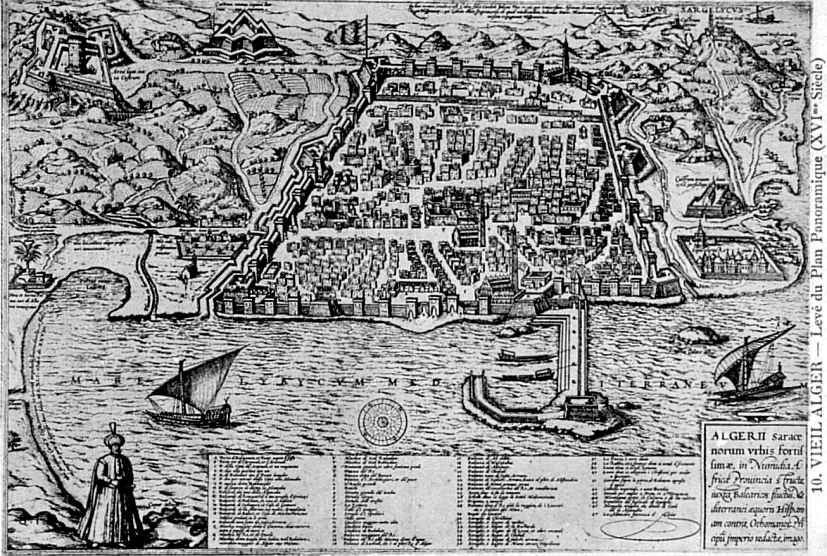
Panoramic map of Algiers dating from the 16th century.

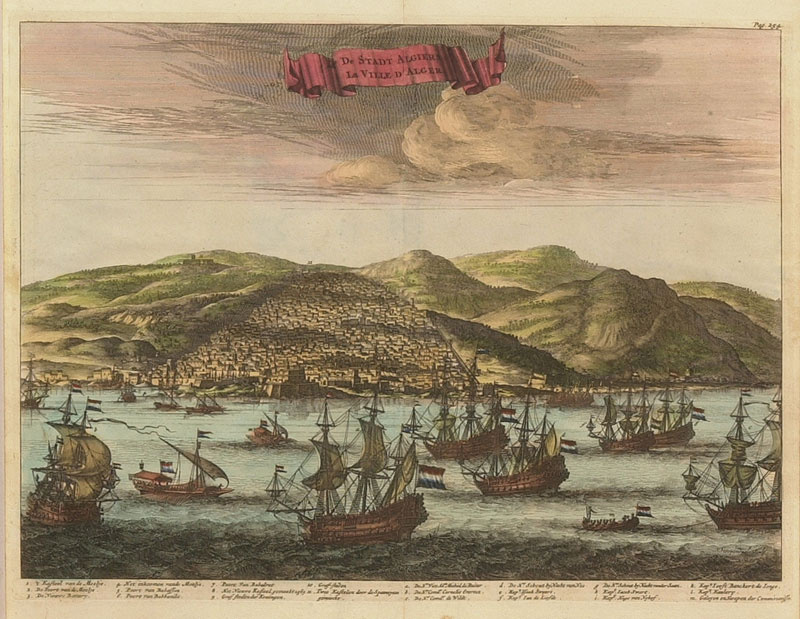
Algiers before the colonization by the French.

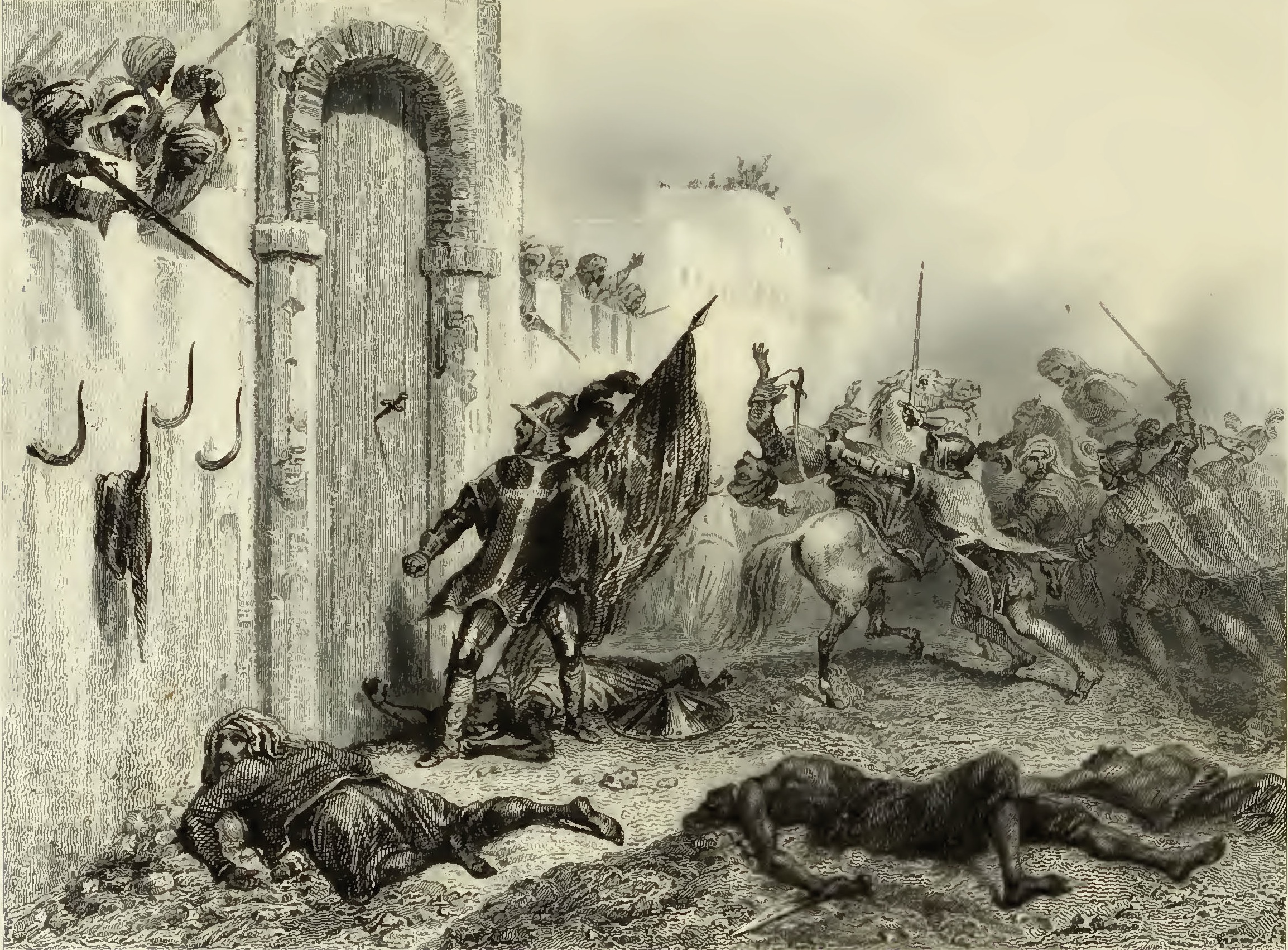
The expedition of Charles V in front of the Bab Azzoun gate.

=== French colonial period ===
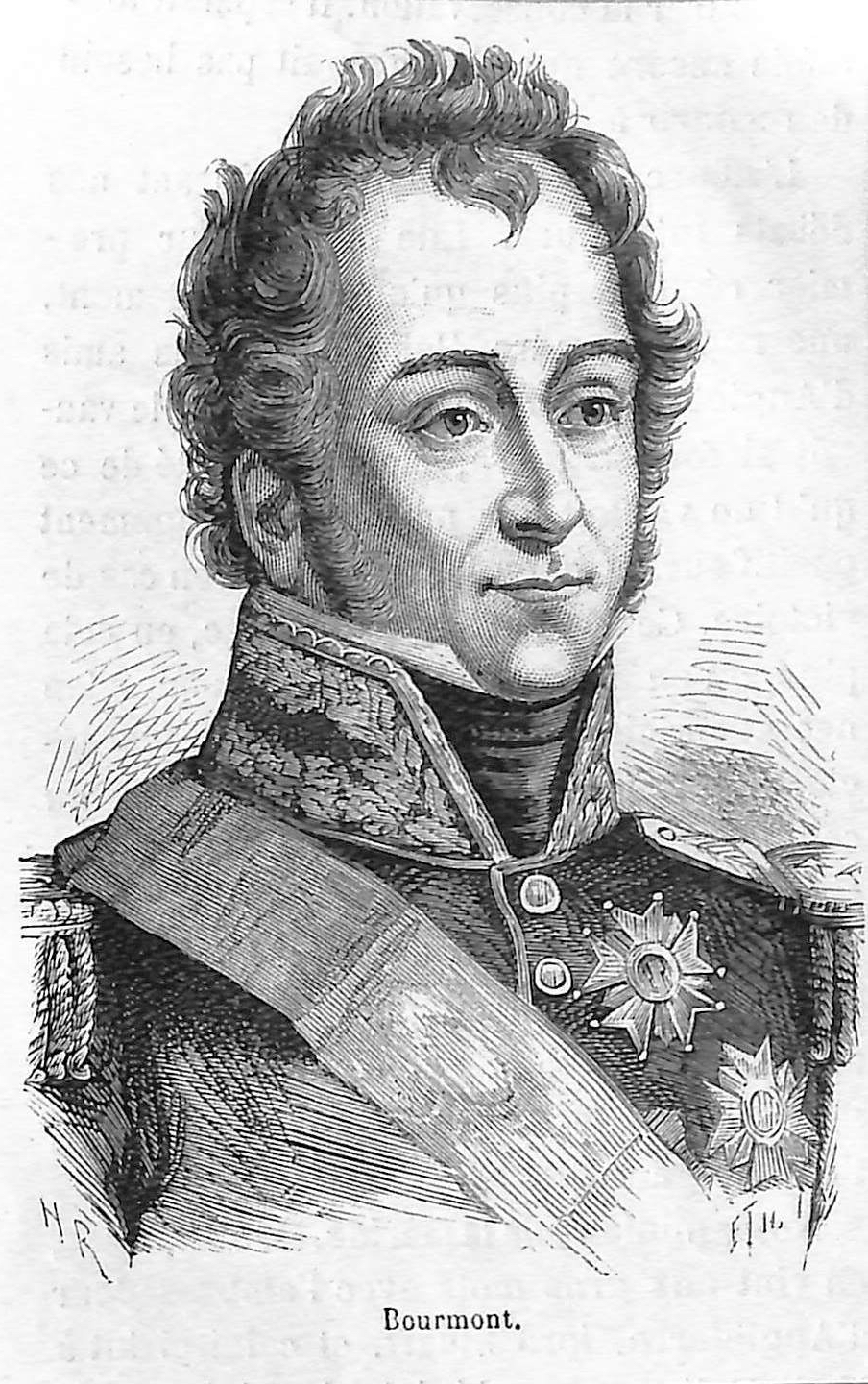
Marshal de Bourmont, conqueror of the Kasbah in 1830.

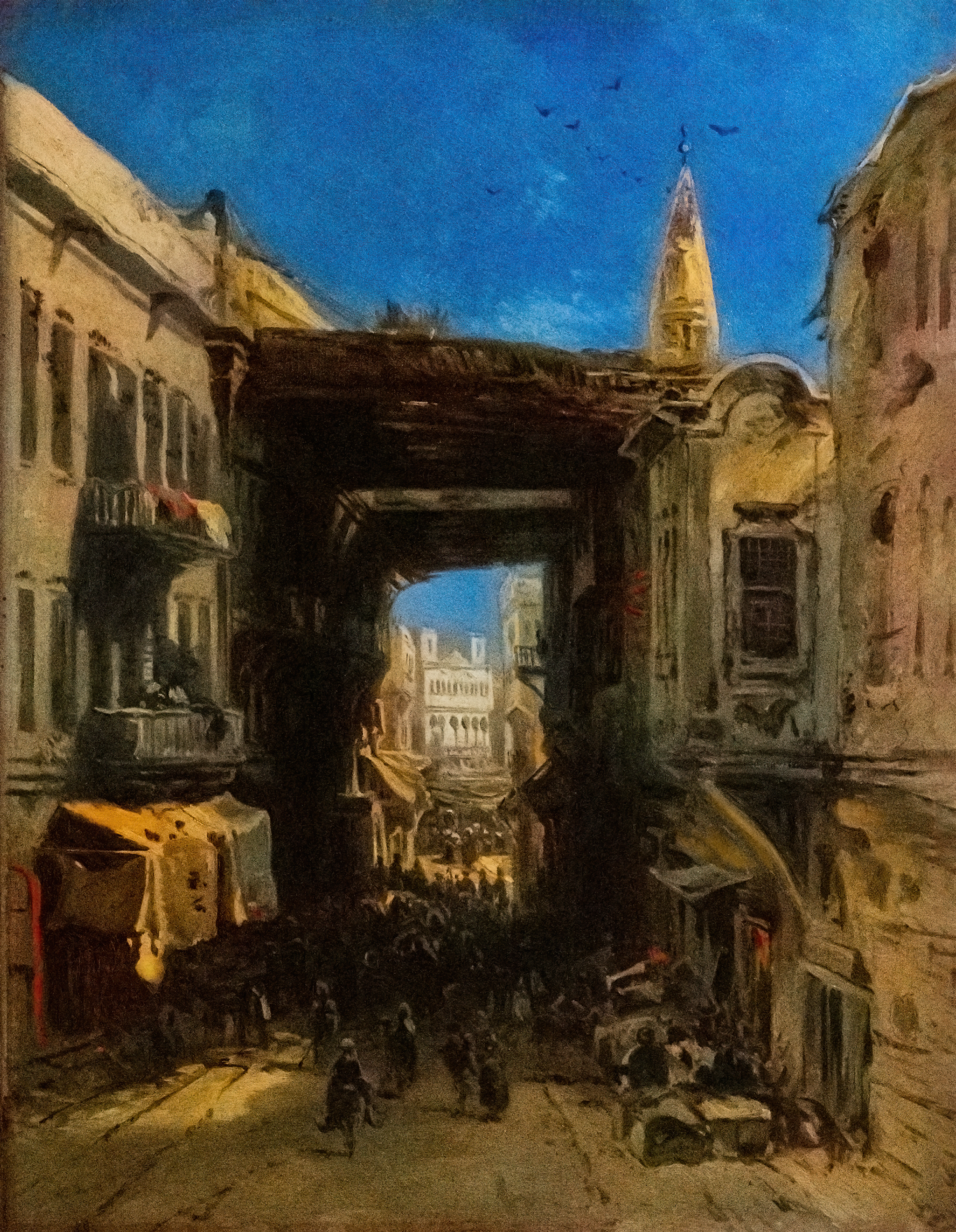
Street in the Kasbah of Algiers, 1830. Eugène Isabey, Narbonne Museum of Fine Arts.

The French army enters Algiers on July 5, 1830. French presence drastically changes the city's appearance and its medina. The French transform the city by demolishing a large part of the lower Casbah and building what is now "Place des Martyrs." Originally extending to the sea, the Casbah is pushed into the background by the new waterfront with its arcaded architecture. Colonization also introduces new roads that surround and penetrate the Casbah. Architecturally, the French introduce the Haussmannian style and demolish the old city's walls.

The period of demolitions lasts until 1860 when Napoleon III halts the policy and sides with the mufti of the Great Mosque of Algiers, preventing further mosques from being converted into churches, as had happened with the Ketchaoua Mosque and the Ali Bitchin Mosque.

Later in the colonial period, a neo-Moorish architectural movement emerges, with its most famous landmarks being the Thaâlibiyya Medersa in 1904 and the Algiers Grand Post Office in 1913. The "Arab city" is traditionally centered around its mosque and souk, but colonization introduces a new spatial organization. Algiers becomes a city where the old and new, the sacred and the secular, coexist, reshaping spaces of social interaction.

With the construction of new European neighborhoods, the Casbah—once the entirety of Algiers in 1830—begins to be perceived as a marginal, residual, and unstable urban area, as economic and political centrality shifts to these new districts. However, it retains social spaces such as mosques, Moorish cafés, plazas (rahba), and hammams. This pattern persists even after independence, and the Casbah never regains its former significance.

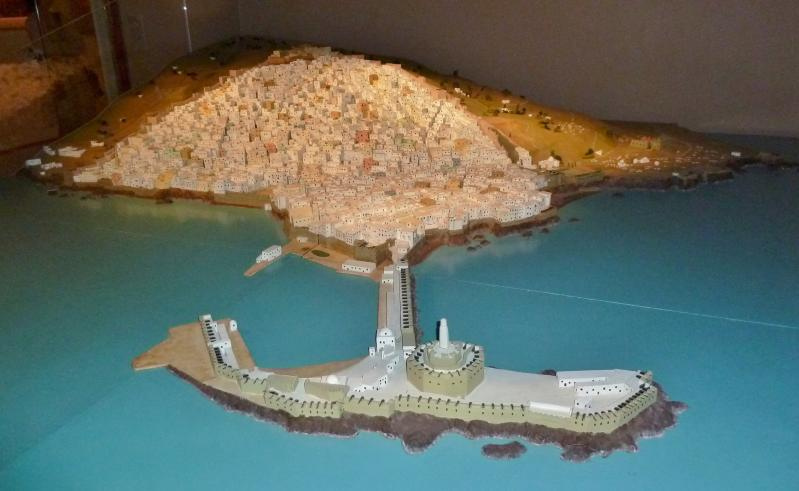
Reconstruction of the Kasbah in 1830.

Algiers in 1890: the colonial seafront and the Kasbah in the background.

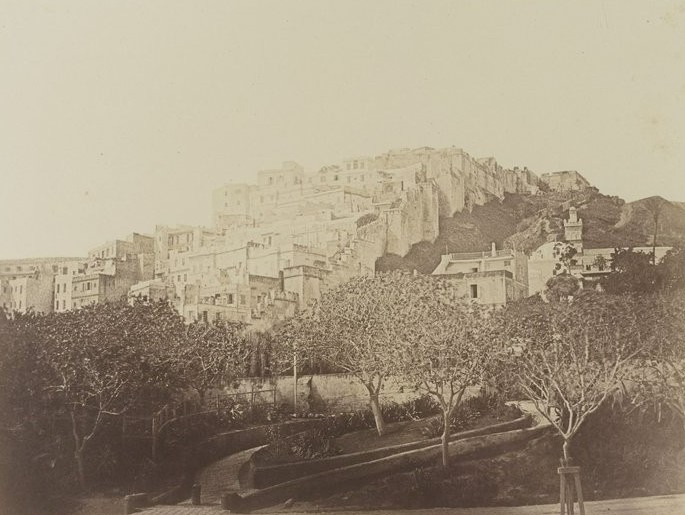
Mosque of Sidi-Abd-er-Rhaman and rampart of Algiers in the mid-19th century.

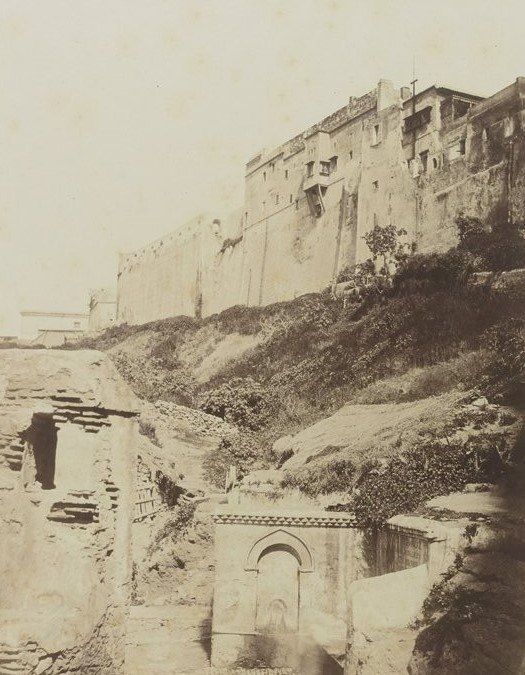
Fountain near the Porte Neuve, mid-19th century.

=== The Algerian war ===
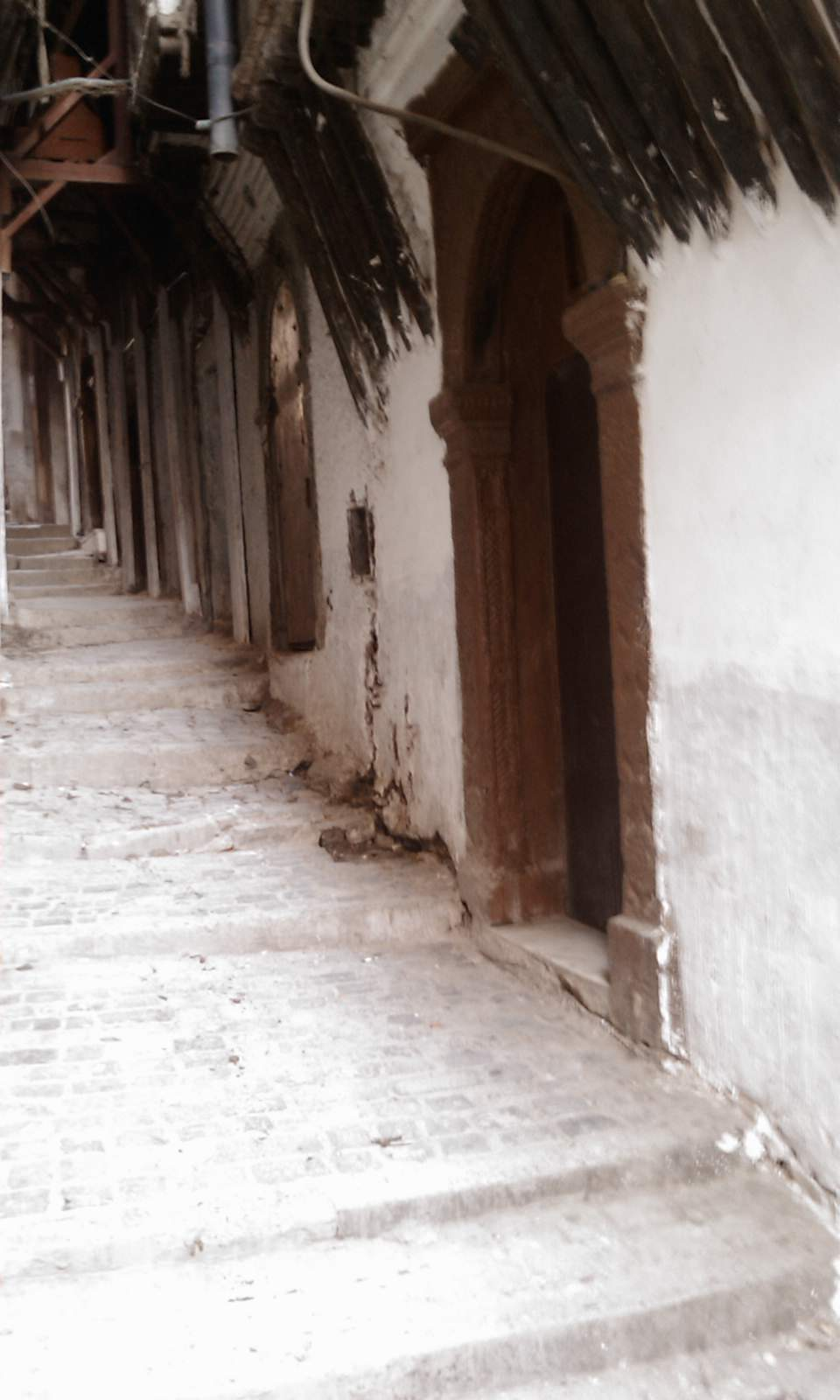
In the foreground, the house at 3 rue Caton, where Yacef Saadi was arrested by paratroopers from the 1st REP on September 28, 1957.

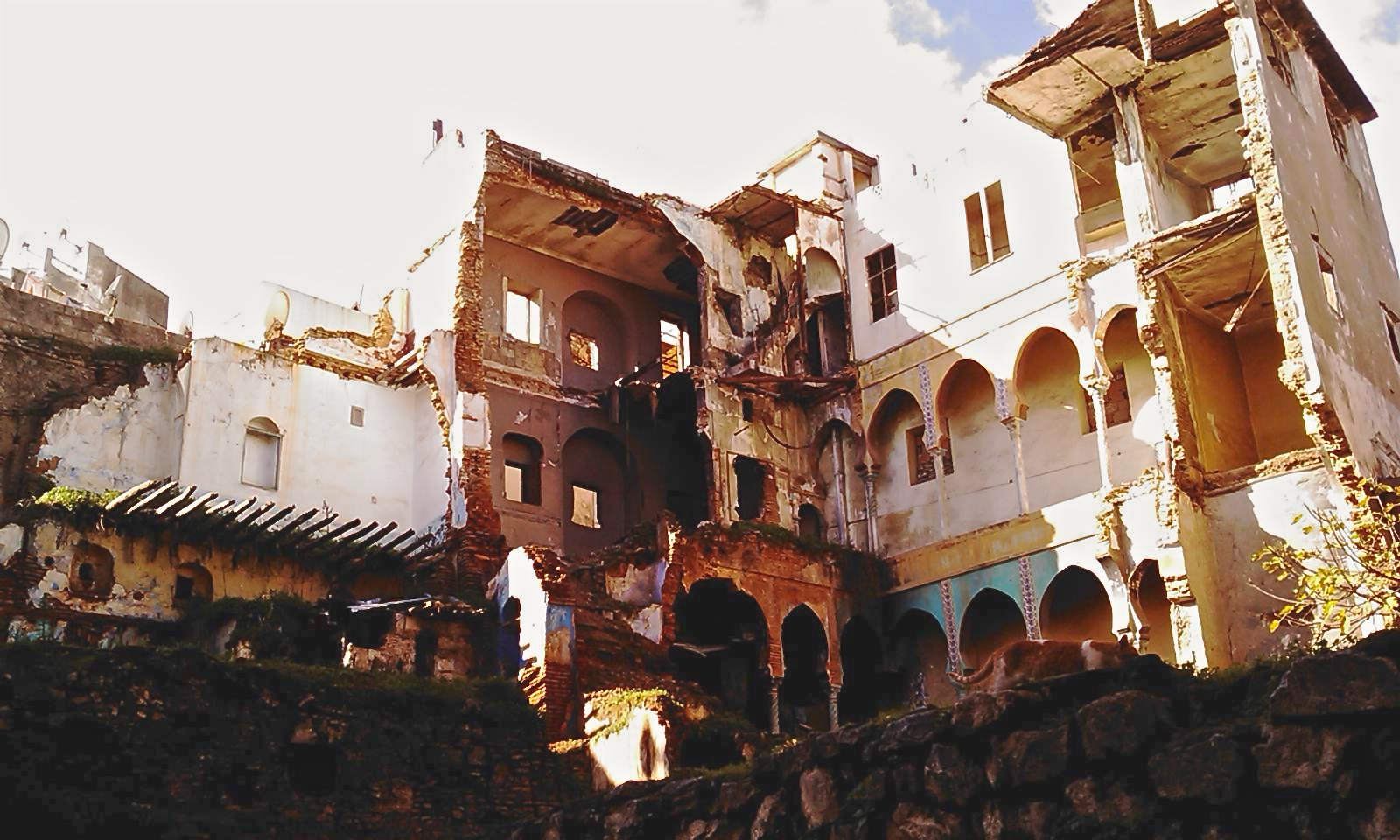
Ruins of the house, located at 5 rue des Abderrames, which served as a hideout for Ali la Pointe, Hassiba Ben Bouali, Petit Omar and Hamid Bouhmidi, after its destruction by paratroopers of the 1st REP on October 8, 1957.

The nationalist movement, which develops in the early 20th century, intensifies in the 1950s, leading to the Algerian War. The Casbah becomes a stronghold of nationalists.

In 1956, newly elected by the "Soummam Congress," the members of the CCE (Coordinating and Executive Committee)—Abane Ramdane, Larbi Ben M'hidi, Krim Belkacem, Saad Dahlab, and Benyoucef Benkhedda—decide to establish themselves in the Casbah. They believe it offers greater control over FLN militants, better communication links, and, most importantly, complete clandestinity. With its hideouts, numerous couriers lost among the masses, and various forms of protection, the capital is seen as an ideal base for urban guerrilla warfare, which they consider as crucial as fighting in the mountains.

The Casbah is the key battleground of the "Battle of Algiers" in 1957. This battle pits Yacef Saadi, head of the Autonomous Zone of Algiers (ZAA) and the independence fighters, against General Massu's 10th Parachute Division. On the ground, the "battle" is won by the French army, which dismantles the FLN networks and the political-administrative organization of the Autonomous Zone of Algiers, using methods later systematized: intelligence gathering by any means, including torture, and from June 1957 onwards, converting and manipulating captured fighters. The streets leading from the Casbah to the European quarters are sealed off with barbed wire and monitored by police and Zouaves.

Captain Léger's infiltration of Yacef Saadi's courier network allows for Saadi's capture on September 23, 1957, at 3 Rue Caton in the Casbah. In October, the FLN enforcer Ali la Pointe, cornered with his comrades Hassiba Ben Bouali, Hamid Bouhmidi, and Petit Omar at 5 Rue des Abderrames, is killed when French paratroopers of the 1st REP detonate their hideout, causing a massive explosion that also kills seventeen civilians, including four young girls aged four and five.

The Casbah also plays a role in the December 1960 demonstrations, where Algerians march into European neighborhoods, and later in the popular uprisings during Algeria's independence.

=== Post-independence ===
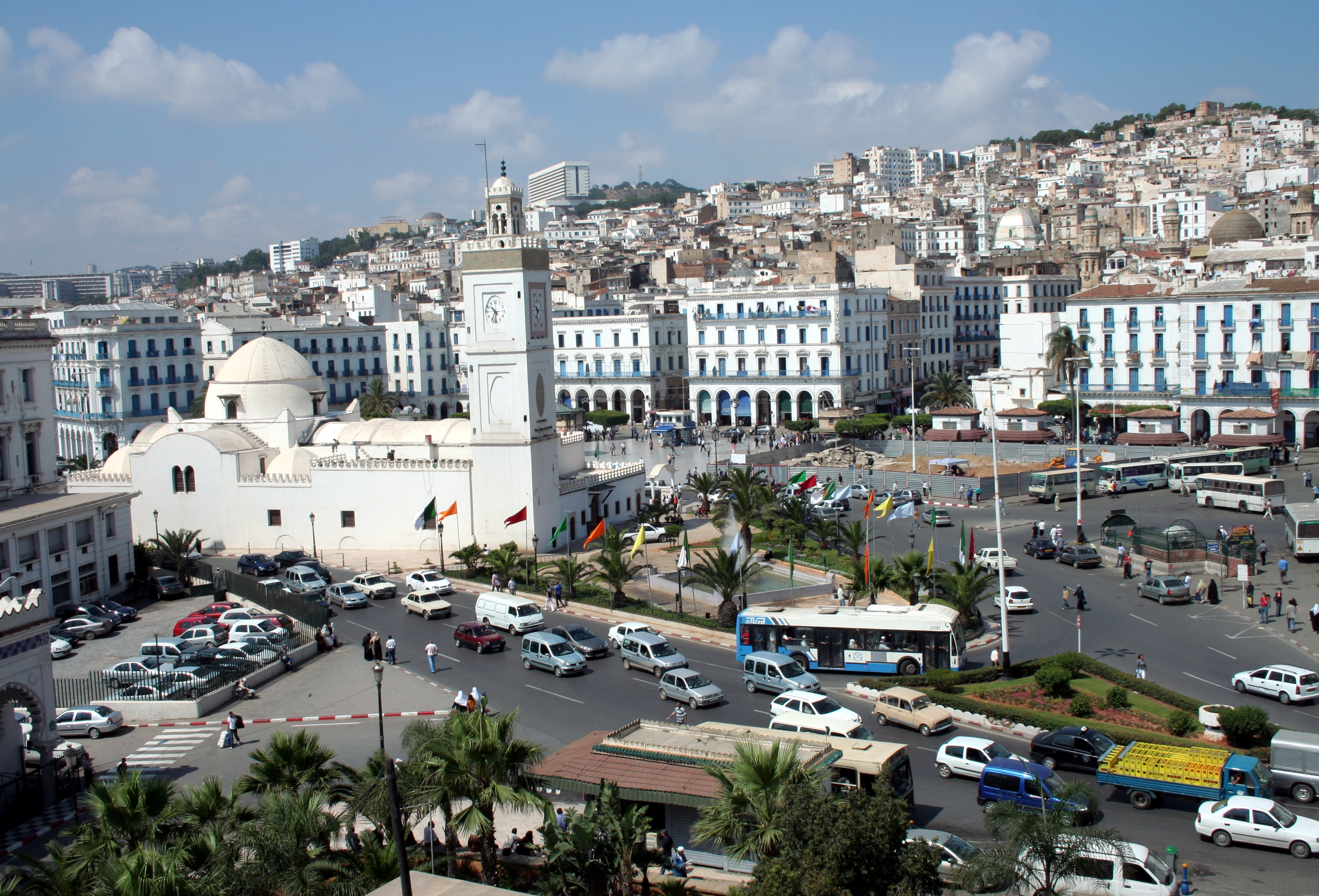
The Kasbah seen from Martyrs' Square; Jamaa al-Jdid in the foreground.

After Algeria's independence, the Casbah experiences an exodus, with native families—the beldiya—moving to more spacious European-style apartments in Bab el Oued or El Biar. The Casbah becomes a site of speculation and transience, where properties are rented and sublet. The original inhabitants are gradually replaced by rural migrants.

Restoration plans follow one another without success due to a lack of political will. The Casbah quickly becomes an overcrowded, deteriorating area that never regains its central role in Algiers. However, it remains a powerful symbol of resistance against injustice and a site of collective memory for the Algerian people. UNESCO designates the Casbah as a World Heritage Site in 1992 and continues to contribute to its preservation. Local associations and residents also engage in restoration efforts and social initiatives. The citadel overlooking the site is currently undergoing advanced restoration.

== Notable Figures ==
- Djamila Bent Mohamed, an Algerian painter, was born there.
- Mohamed Tadjadit, an Algerian poet, grew up there.

== Socio-Urban Structure ==
The urban layout of the Casbah of Algiers is characteristic of Maghrebian Arab-Berber medinas. The later Ottoman influence is mainly seen in military architecture, particularly in the citadel overlooking the city. Originally, the term "Casbah" referred solely to this citadel before it was extended to encompass the entire medina, defined by the fortifications built during the Regency of Algiers in the 16th century. The Casbah of Algiers presents a complex and mysterious urban fabric, particularly intriguing to Orientalist painters. The city's natural topography explains its winding streets, true labyrinths characteristic of the old city, as it occupies a hilly site facing the sea. According to architect Ravéreau, "the site creates the city", while Le Corbusier observes that houses and terraces are oriented toward the sea, a source of both fortune and misfortune (shipwrecks, missing sailors). The old city is fundamentally oriented towards the Mediterranean and turns its back on the hinterland. It is severed from direct sea access during colonization due to the construction of coastal boulevards. The very narrow alleys sometimes lead to dead ends or vaulted passageways known as sabat. Donkeys are among the few animals capable of navigating the entire Casbah, and since the era of the Regency of Algiers, they have been used for garbage collection. Alongside the dense network of traditional alleyways, colonial-era roads like "Rue d'Isly" and "Rue de la Lyre" penetrate the Casbah.

The Casbah has an urban space organization that aligns with the site and its terrain. To this day, it remains oriented toward the "Amirauté," its historic port. Le Corbusier deemed its urban planning perfect, noting the tiered arrangement of houses, which ensures that each terrace has a view of the sea. The spatial organization reflects social life. Certain spaces are considered intimate, such as house terraces, which are primarily reserved for women. The hawma, referring to the neighborhood, is seen as a semi-private space, while commercial centers (souks), fountains, and places of power are regarded as fully public. The Casbah also has, in each district, mosques and kouba (shrines) of local saints, such as those of Sidi Abderrahmane and Sidi Brahim, whose tomb is located in the Amirauté of Algiers.

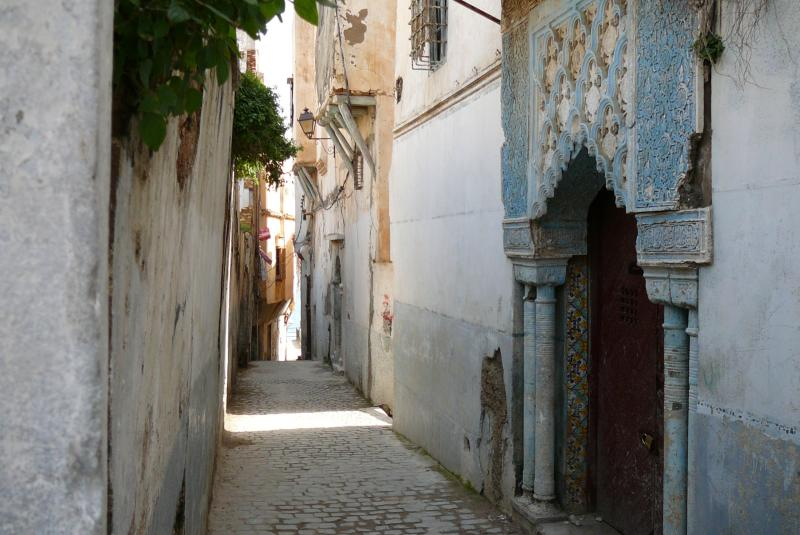
Alleyway in the old town.

The Casbah of Algiers is traditionally divided into a "lower Casbah," a large part of which was demolished to make way for colonial-style buildings and the present-day Place des Martyrs, and an "upper Casbah," which is better preserved and includes the citadel and Dar Soltan, the last palace of the Dey. The lower Casbah has traditionally been the hub of trade and power in the old city. It is where the traditional decision-making centers were concentrated, such as the former palace of the Dey, the Djenina—demolished during colonization—Dar Hassan Pacha, which became the winter palace of the governor of Algeria during the colonial period, as well as the Palais des Raïs, which housed the corsairs of the Regency of Algiers. This district was also the focus of modifications by the colonial administration, keen to establish itself in the heart of Algiers and leave its mark on the city. The walls and gates were partially demolished by the French military during the city's redevelopment. However, they remain in popular memory through toponymy. Thus, it is common to navigate Algiers using the names of the city's former gates, such as Bab El Oued (which gives its name to the adjacent neighborhood), Bab Jdid, Bab el Bhar, and Bab Azzoun. Within the Casbah, there are souks, such as those in the Ketchaoua Mosque district and Jamaa el Houd (the former synagogue of Algiers). Some souks have retained their specialties, such as the one on Rue Bab Azzoun, dedicated to traditional clothing (burnous, karakou, etc.), or the one on Rue des Dinandiers. The Algerian souk, which was banned at the beginning of the colonial period, remains the most common means of trade for the population, particularly through the practice of trabendo (informal trade). The streets around the Ketchaoua Mosque are often filled with merchandise, recreating an atmosphere reminiscent of the old city's social and economic interactions. The Casbah also preserves functional hammams, such as "Hammam Bouchlaghem," which dates back to the Ottoman era and is frequented by both the Jewish and Muslim communities of the city. The city's former commercial vocation is reflected in its foundouks, such as the one near Jamaa el Kebir, which still has a courtyard surrounded by stacked arcades, or the one located within the citadel.

Since the time of the Regency of Algiers, the Casbah has always played a leading role in Algeria, offering opportunities to both poor inhabitants and merchants from the countryside. It has attracted many Kabyles, given their region's proximity, as well as, to a lesser extent, peasants from all over Algeria after the country's independence. This rural exodus has led to a relative overpopulation of the Casbah. It remains a gateway to the city of Algiers, serving as a transit point and a refuge for the most destitute. The departure of original families to other neighborhoods, such as Bab El Oued, in search of European-style apartments has led to ongoing social transformations within the Casbah, with a constant renewal of part of its population since independence.

The Casbah is also socially defined by its traditional craftsmanship, which provides a livelihood for many families. Craftsmen used to organize themselves into zenkat (commercial streets), such as the zenkat n'hass (Copper Alley) for coppersmiths. However, due to social changes during colonization and after independence, traditional crafts have significantly declined. Artisans no longer group themselves into guilds or zenkat, and many prefer to abandon their trades, which no longer guarantee sufficient income in a modern society. Nonetheless, local associations, residents, and, to a lesser extent, authorities, are working to preserve these trades and uphold their social role through apprenticeship schools, where young people are trained in artisanal crafts.

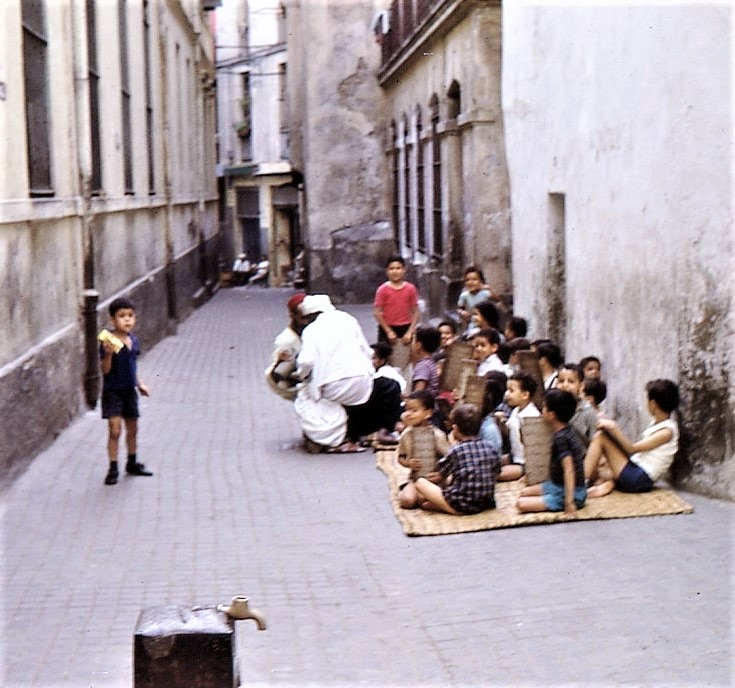
School in the Casbah in July 1967.

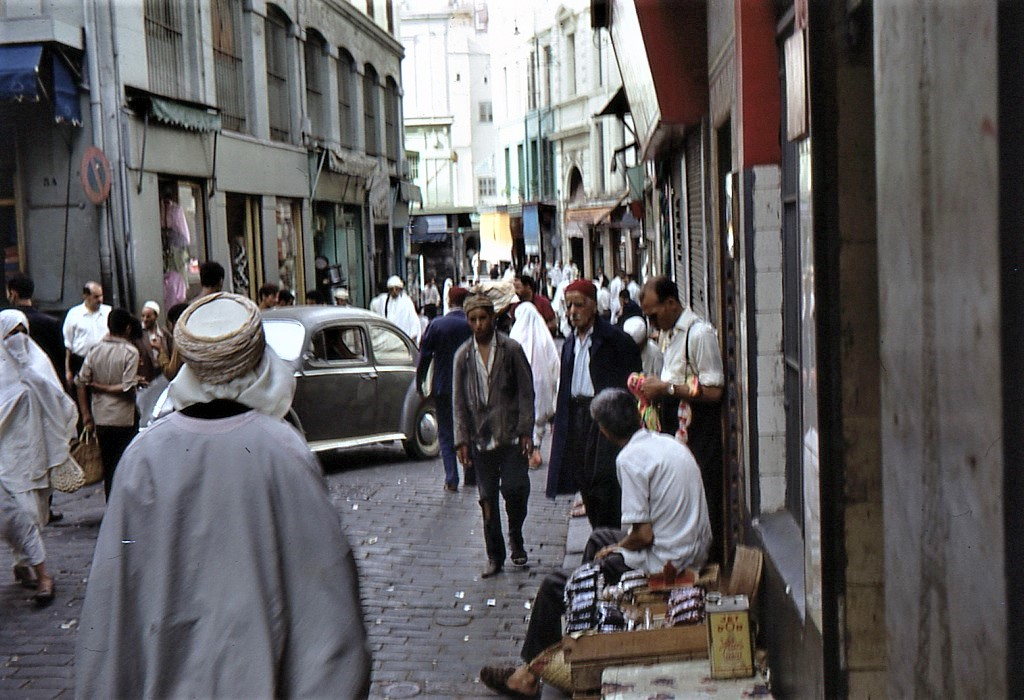
Rue de la Casbah in July 1967.

The Casbah is a meeting place for two forms of socialization. The first is that of the beldiya (native city dwellers), who can be considered part of a "mythical" socialization process, as they symbolize the city and justify certain social practices through a shared identity. (Note: For example, associating a city with a patron saint signifies a lineage and ancestry linked to an urban identity. The term Ouled Sidi Abderrahmane (literally "descendants of Saint Sidi Abderrahmane") translates the expression Ouled el Bled ("children of the city").) The second form of socialization is that of migrants, who have developed their own cultural expressions. Their contributions to popular culture—through music, cafés, and the concept of bandits d'honneur (honorable outlaws)—reflect their deep-rooted presence in the city. In practice, symbols of this popular culture, often carried by people of rural origin, are frequently used in nostalgic narratives about the Casbah. Hadj El Anka, the famous chaâbi singer born in Bab Jdid (upper Casbah), is often cited as one of the key figures of Casbadji life. The image of a warm, close-knit, and tolerant popular culture continues to shape descriptions of daily life in the Casbah.

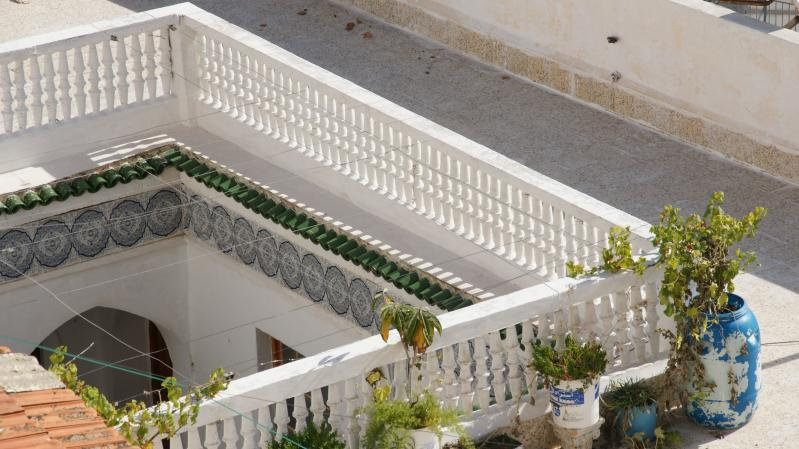
Terrace of a Kasbah house.

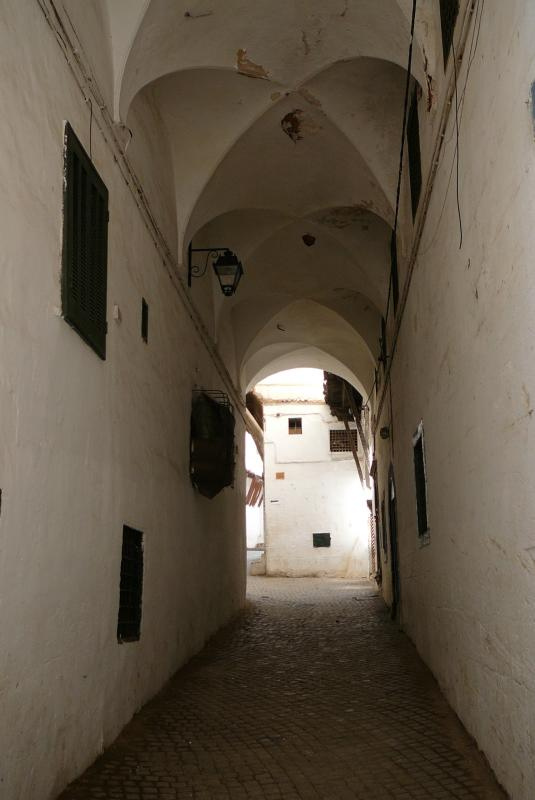
An arched passage or Sabbath gate.

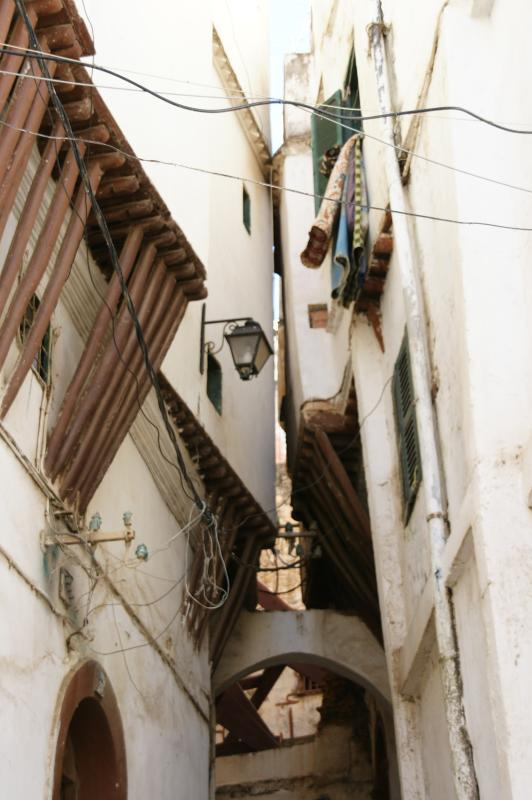
Closely spaced buildings, evidence of dense urbanization.

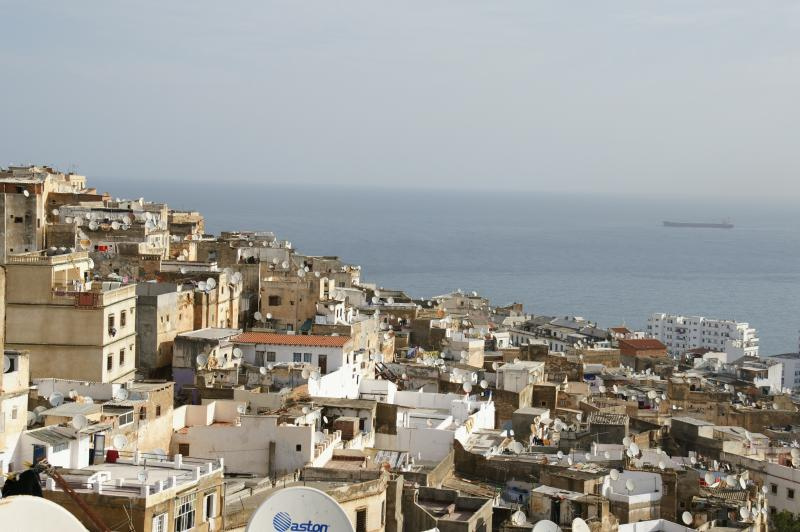
Terraces descending "in steps" towards the sea.

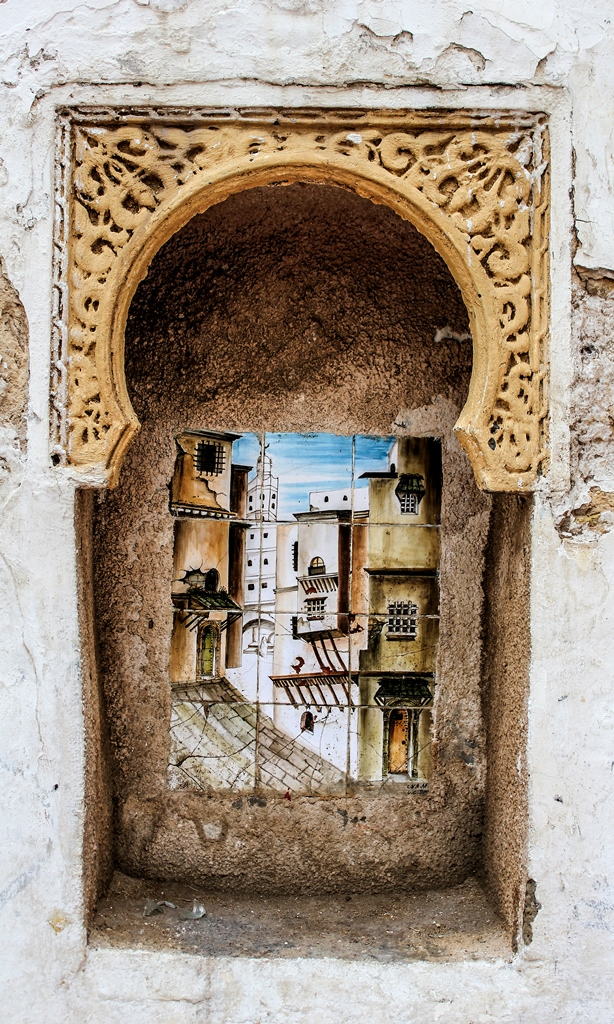
Painted slabs with the Kasbah motif.

=== Population and demographics ===
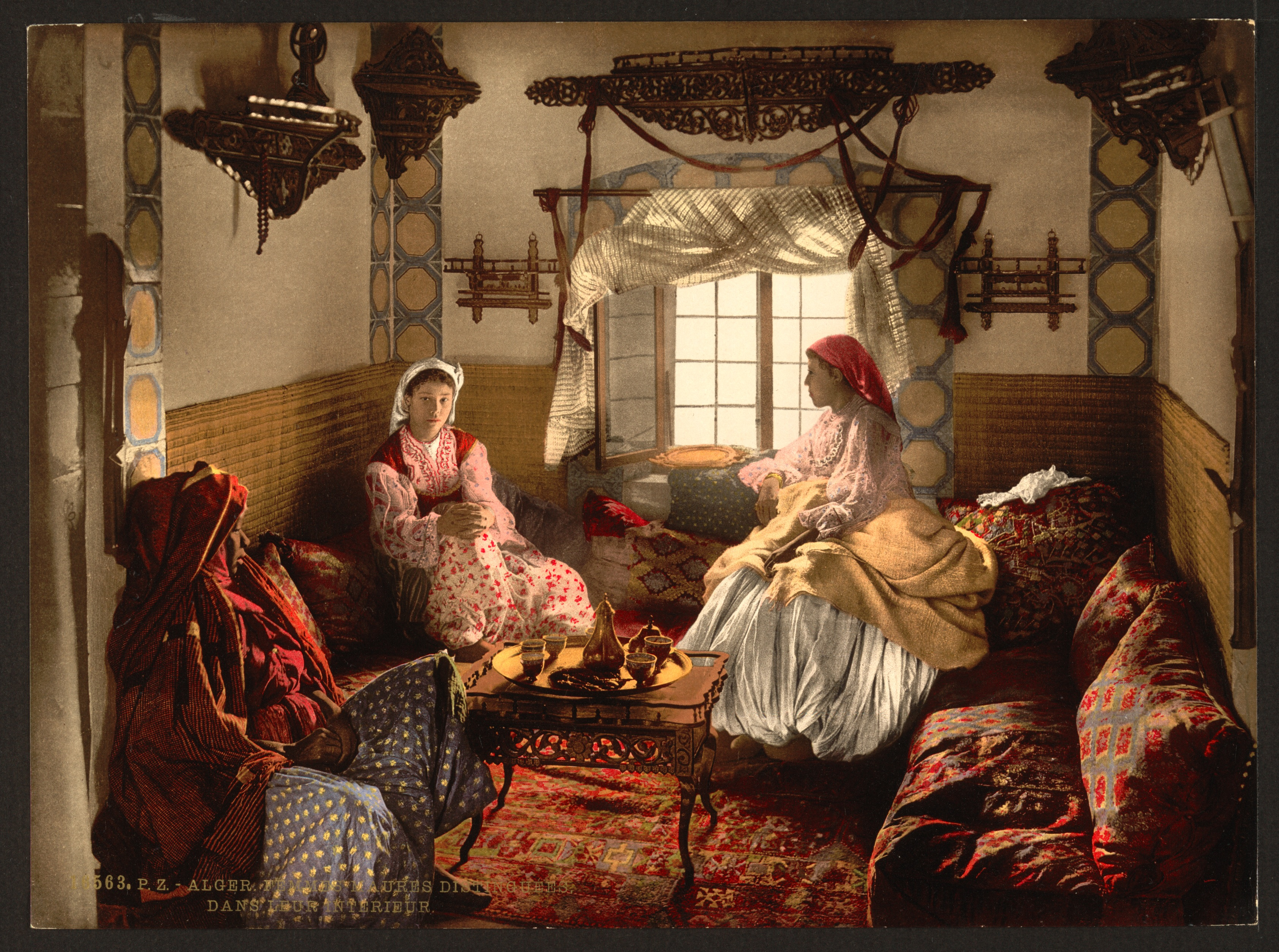
"Moorish" women (Note: The term Moor, widely used in the 19th century, referred to the urban Arabs of Algiers.) from a family of notables (c. end of the 19th century).

In antiquity, the population of Algiers was relatively small, consisting mainly of Romanized Berbers. During the Zirid period in the 10th century, the city became a small but prosperous settlement, though its population remained limited—small enough to seek refuge on nearby islets in case of attack. The exclusively Berber character of Algiers' population was later modified with the arrival of the Tha‛alaba, a small Arab tribe expelled from Titteri in the 13th century. This led to a gradual process of Arabization, particularly in the religious sphere.

The city's growth in the 16th and 17th centuries (Note: It was during this period that Algiers became the capital of the Regency of Algiers.) was accompanied by demographic expansion. Algiers had about 60,000 inhabitants by the late 14th century and over 150,000 by the 17th century. This demographic shift transformed the city into a melting pot of Mediterranean populations at the expense of its Berber heritage. By this time, Kabyles made up only a tenth of the population, largely due to the Ottoman rulers' distrust of these groups, whose region remained politically independent, structured around the dissident Kingdom of Koukou and the Kingdom of the Beni Abbès.

The rest of the population included Arab families from Algiers, some descended from the Tha‛alaba, as well as Andalusians and Tagarins who arrived from the 14th century onward. In the early 17th century, Algiers welcomed 25,000 Moriscos, who contributed to the city's urban expansion. Other residents came from cities within the Regency, such as Annaba, Constantine, and Tlemcen. These urban dwellers distinguished themselves from the Arabs of the interior, particularly through their dialect, which was difficult for southern nomads and Berbers to understand. Many worked in administration, commerce, or religious affairs. The Turks controlled key positions in the government, military, and navy, while the city also attracted many Christian renegades, who were often recruited as corsairs. Another significant group was the berrani ("outsiders"), rural communities mainly from Saharan cities and oases such as Biskra, Laghouat, and the M'zab region. A Jewish community also lived in Algiers, composed of rural migrants from within Algeria, as well as Jews of Spanish origin who arrived from the 14th century and later from Livorno in the 17th century. Additionally, the city was home to Kouloughlis (offspring of Turkish fathers and local mothers) and freed Black slaves.

With the decline of Barbary piracy in the late 17th century, Algiers' population began to shrink. From 150,000 inhabitants in the 17th century, it fell to 50,000 by the late 18th century and just 25,000 on the eve of the French conquest. After the city was taken by the French in 1830, nearly half of the population emigrated, refusing to live under Christian rule. By 1831, a census recorded only 12,000 residents, a decline explained by the flight of 6,000 Turks and the departure of urban populations to the interior regions of the country.

Algiers' Muslim population did not return to its previous levels until 1901, thanks to a massive influx of Kabyle migrants, leading to a process of "re-Berberization" of the city. By the 20th century, the Casbah had become home to a significant number of families from the Djurdjura region.

After independence, the Casbah underwent another wave of migration. Many urban families moved to former European neighborhoods, while rural migrants replaced them. The Casbah remains one of the most densely populated areas in the world, though its population density has declined since the 1980s as residents move to less crowded districts in Algiers. This residential de-densification has helped ease overcrowding in working-class neighborhoods. However, the collapse of aging buildings has also contributed to population decline. In 2004, the administrative district of the Casbah (which extends slightly beyond the historical site) had 45,076 residents, down from 70,000 in 1998. The historic site itself housed 50,000 inhabitants in 1998, with a density of 1,600 people per hectare, despite its capacity being estimated at only 900 per hectare.

== Architecture ==
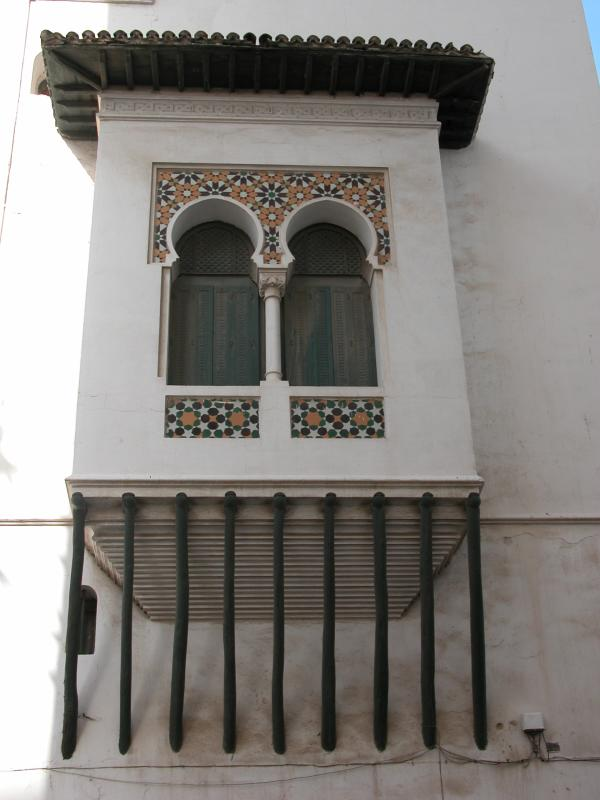
Window of a corbel known locally as a kbou.

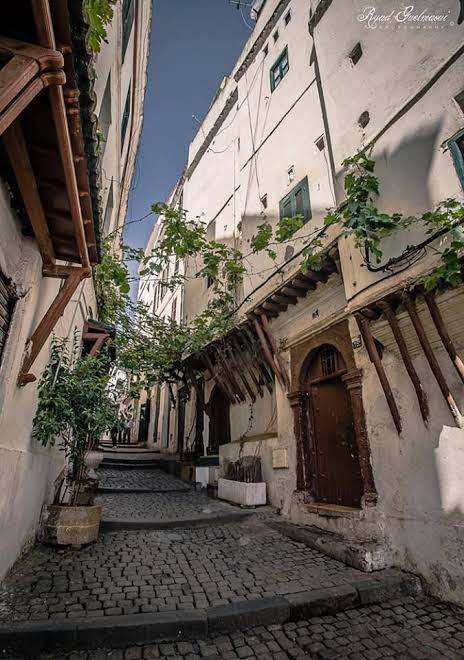
A street in the old town of Algiers

The Casbah of Algiers is a quintessential example of traditional Maghrebi cities, found in the western Mediterranean and sub-Saharan Africa. Despite various changes over time, the urban ensemble has largely preserved its integrity. The aesthetic characteristics of Islamic art and the original construction materials remain intact.

The Casbah still retains its citadel, palaces, mosques, wast al-dar (houses with central patios), mausoleums, and hammams, all of which contribute to its unique identity. Its military architecture bears Ottoman influences from the Regency period, while its civil architecture maintains the authenticity of Maghrebi medinas. However, the Casbah is also an evolving space. During the colonial era, some buildings were demolished to make way for European-style residences, particularly along the waterfront and at the city's European periphery. As a result, Haussmann-style buildings from the colonial period now stand at the edges of the Casbah and are considered part of its classified heritage. In addition, modifications to housing structures have introduced non-traditional materials, and traditional building supplies—such as thuya wood—are becoming scarce. The Casbah's social marginalization and the inefficiency of conservation plans have made it a threatened site, despite its UNESCO classification.

=== Construction techniques ===
==== Walls and arches ====
Structure of a two-layered climbing wall.

The walls of the Casbah are built using the commande technique, meaning they are composed of tightly fitted bricks. Some walls feature a mixed structure, using a variety of materials such as rubble and wood. One commonly used method is the construction of double-layered walls, with a rigid brick outer layer and a flexible wooden framework. This design provides earthquake resistance. The vertical structures include brick arcades and columns, with two main types of arches: outrepassé brisé (broken horseshoe arches) and pointed arches. Cedarwood beams are often placed at the base of arch capitals or at the intersection of two arches.

==== Roofs and floors ====
The roofing can be masonry or wood-structured. Masonry roofs are often cross-vaulted and can be used for domestic spaces such as entrances, stair landings, or large spaces in major buildings (palaces, mosques...). Wooden structures are often used for floors or terrace roofs; they are composed of logs, over which branches or wooden planks are placed to support a mortar made of earth and lime. This mortar itself serves as a base for ceramic tiles or a lime waterproofing layer for terraces. Metal structures, used as floor supports, are more recent as they date back to the colonial period (19th century). This non-traditional material has aged poorly, and many structural issues are due to its use.

==== Openings and staircases ====
Crossings in masonry structures can be made using arcades, which are themselves masonry, or flat bands of wood or marble. In patios, the arches are most often horseshoe arches forming a slight ogive. The staircases in the Casbah are masonry structures with a wooden framework. A sloped platform is poured over wooden logs, on top of which bricks form the steps. Decoration varies, with marble adorning grand residences, while slate is used in modest homes.

==== Ornaments ====
Various elements are used to decorate the houses of the Casbah: wooden balustrades, door openings, capitals, and ceramic tiles for floors and walls. The porticos and galleries give the Casbah its distinctive architectural identity. The arrangement of ogival arches is characteristic of its spatial composition. The patio is an example of this arrangement, where the harmony of the arch sequence can mask geometric variations, provided they maintain a consistent height (from the springing of the arch to its keystone). Variations in the width of the arches do not disrupt the overall visual harmony. The Casbah's arches are often of the horseshoe type; their shapes, either pointed or broken, constitute an Algerian architectural specificity.

The characteristic ornamentation includes horizontal friezes and vertical appliqués. These arch ornaments are made of ceramics, and the size of the rings is in harmony with the overall architectural design. Given the considerable demand for tiles, some are imported from Italy, France, and the Netherlands. Finally, capitals, some of which are recovered from the Roman ruins of Icosium, are used to decorate the upper parts of columns. Capitals and abaci reinforce the uniqueness of the Casbah's architecture.

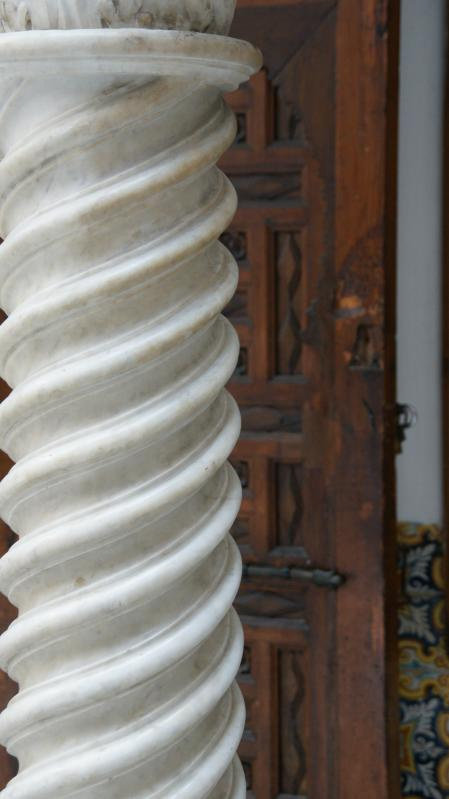
Column with a twisted shaft.

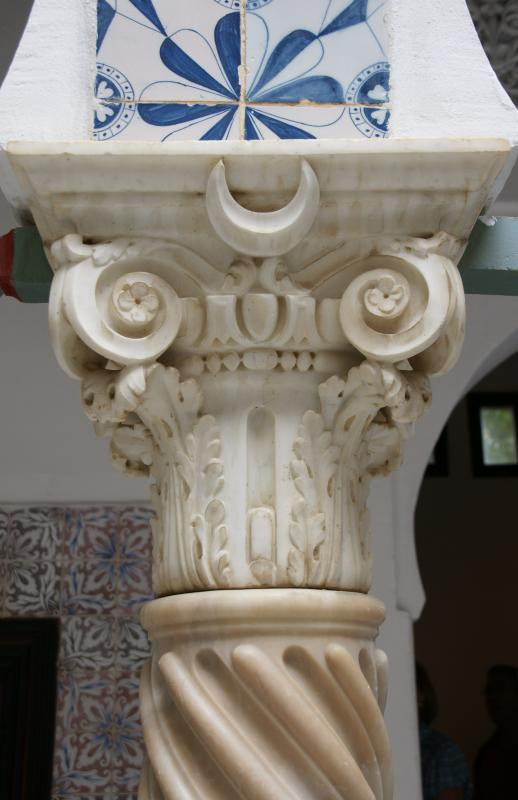
Composite capital of white marble, decorated with a crescent.

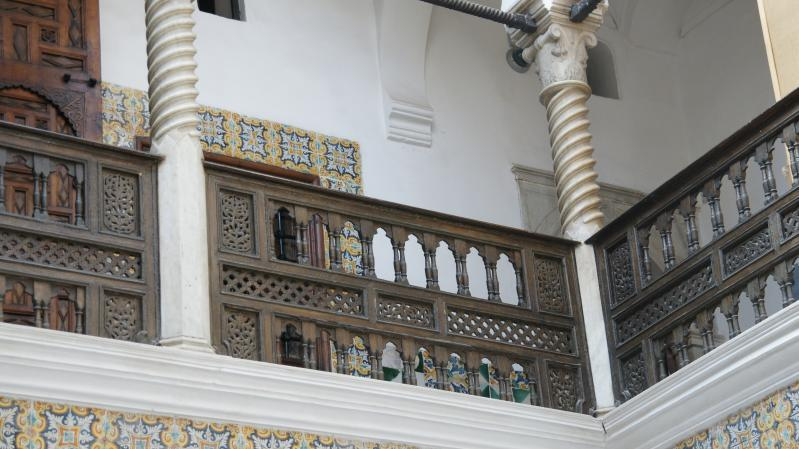
Balustrade of carved wood.

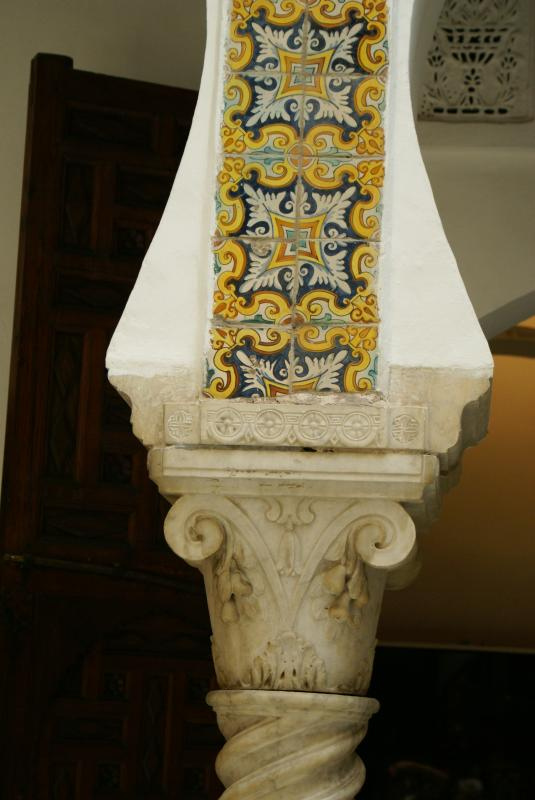
Ornamental features of an archway: ceramic frieze, abacus and capital.

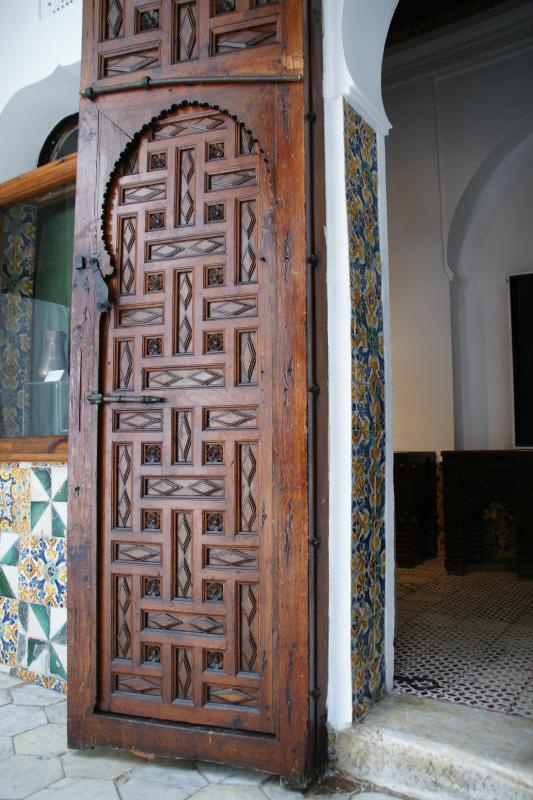
Inner door opening carved with geometric motifs.

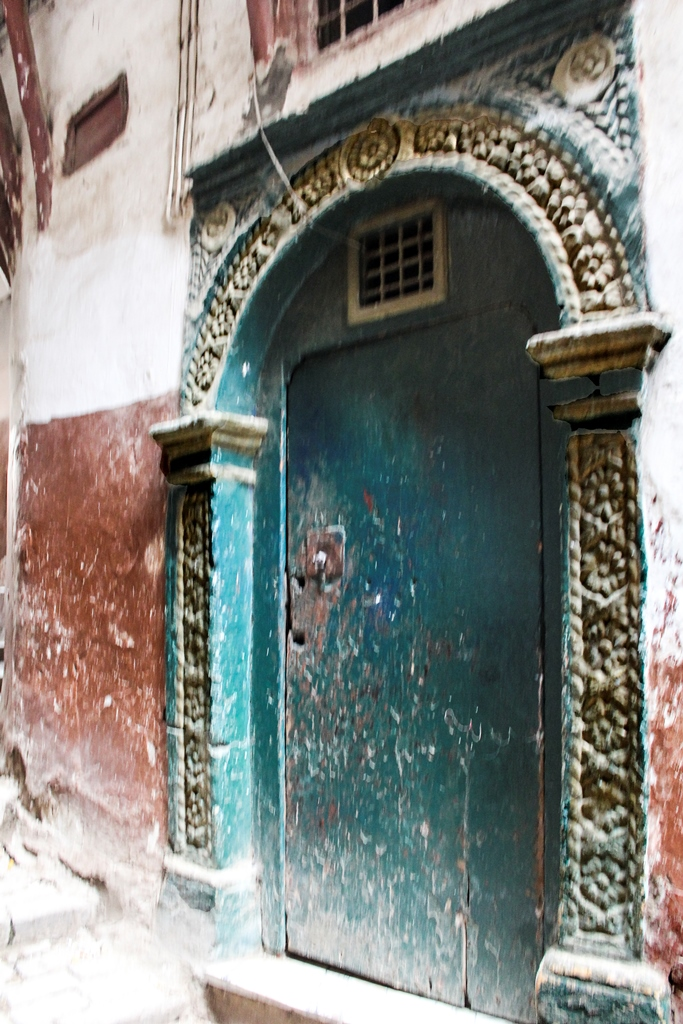
Framed door ornamentation

=== Domestic architecture ===
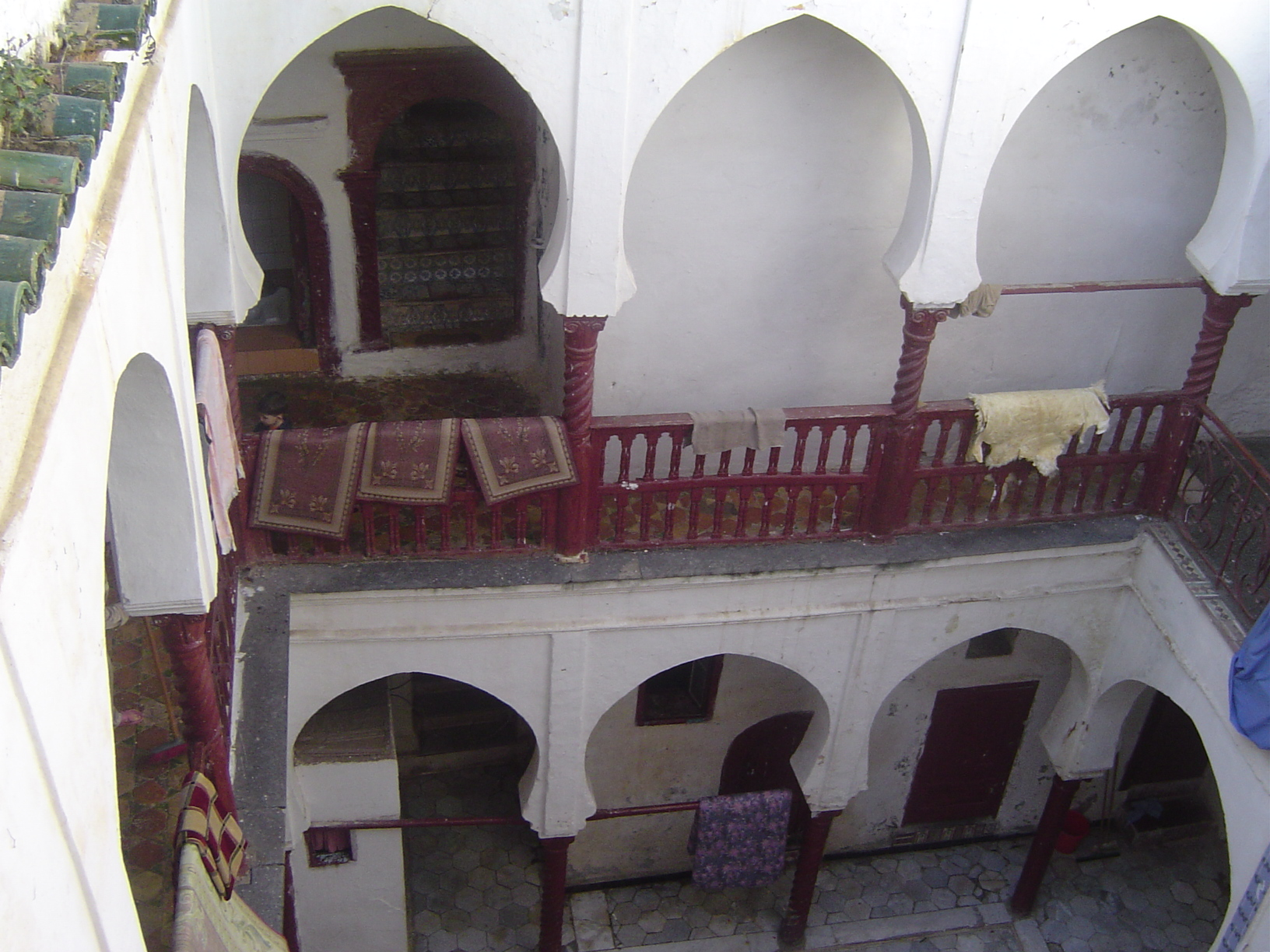
View of a courtyard of a house in the Casbah of Algiers.

The domestic architecture of the Casbah represents a traditional human habitat rooted in Muslim culture and deeply Mediterranean in character. The typology remains relatively stable between palaces and the modest artisan's home. The typical Casbah house is clustered, attached, and presents only one façade. It is believed that this method of grouping dwellings dates back to the Zirid era. The footprint of a house generally ranges between 30 m^{2} and 60 m^{2}.

It always has a view of the sea thanks to its terrace, and light is generally provided by the patio or, less frequently, by a window facing the street. The entrance door always includes a grille to allow ventilation of the lower floors with cool air from the alleyways. The Algerian house is oriented inward, particularly toward its patio (wast al-dar), which is the heart of the home and contains a well (bir). It serves as a convivial space for families, with up to four sharing a house, and is also the traditional area for receiving visitors. The walls are masonry constructions made of lightly fired earth bricks and a mortar consisting of lime and thick earth. The floors are built with wooden logs, while the foundations use a barrel vault technique. The roof is flat, with a thick layer of earth—up to 70 cm on terraces—and the surface is coated with a mortar made of earth and natural additives, all covered with lime. The wastewater drainage system consists of a genuine network of brick sewers beneath the streets, following the slope of the site, dating back to the Regency of Algiers. The connections are made with interlocking pottery elements. Since colonization, the network has been modernized.

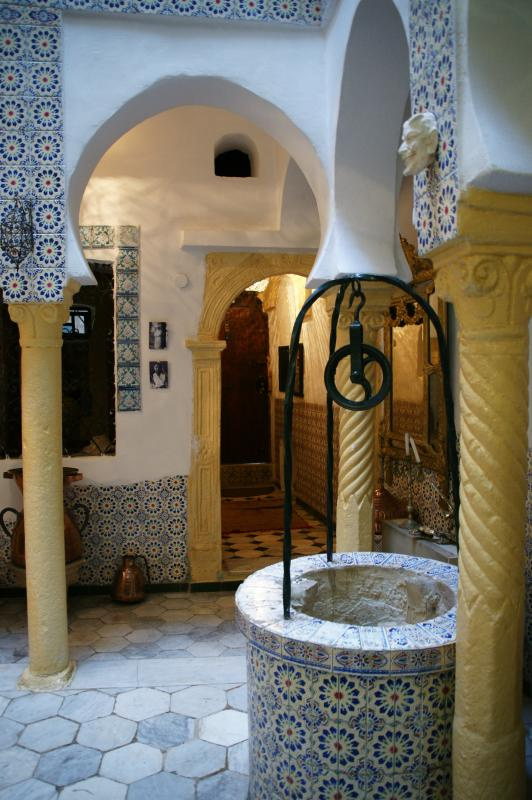
A domestic well in a patio.

The domestic typology of the Casbah is divided into several subcategories: the alaoui house, the chebk house, the portico house, and the palaces. The alaoui house is the only one without a patio, with air and light coming through windows. Built on a small plot, its ground floor—smaller than the total footprint due to the sloping terrain—may be used for commerce or storage. The upper floor—sometimes two floors—contains a single large room. To maximize space, this type of house incorporates overhangs.

The chebk house is often an annex (douera) of a larger house and is designed to fit minimal space constraints. Its very narrow patio is located upstairs and is paved with marble, while the rooms have terracotta tile flooring. The walls also feature ceramic tiles and lime. The portico house is the quintessential patio house, oriented inward. In the upper floors, it may cede space to neighboring houses and often features a beautiful second-floor room with a kbou (a cantilevered projection over the street aligned with the room). The patio and windows are adorned with ceramic tiles in geometric or floral motifs.

=== Typology of the medina ===
Coupe de la rue Aroubi; the houses are terraced, with different levels, and lean against each other (supporting type).

Algerian medinas reflect an evolution in urban typology over time. It is established that cities and urban spaces develop from villages into proto-urban and then fully urban typologies throughout history. The transition from a proto-urban nucleus to an urban one is marked morphologically by horizontal and then vertical densification, a classic pattern in the evolution of dwellings over the centuries.

Densification, for a given plot, consists of occupying all available space; then, additional construction modules are stacked to create upper floors. Algiers is a city with variable development, exhibiting the successive stages of this evolution. It reached a significant level of urbanization as early as the medieval period, featuring an advanced typology of buildings reaching up to four stories above the ground floor, with an average of two stories in the Casbah. In contrast, the Casbah of Dellys, as old as that of Algiers, represents a proto-urban typology, where courtyard staircases are not integrated into the layout to form a patio but remain an occasional architectural means of access to upper rooms.

The typology of the medina is dense in a horizontal sense and introverted; the patio houses occupying a central plot can even be adjoining on all four sides (this typology can be found in Algiers, Blida, Miliana, and Dellys). Houses share one, two, or three party walls. The limited space within the housing block, where similar and neighboring houses proliferate, influences the individual typology of each house. The whole forms a continuous built environment characteristic of the Casbah, of the "load-bearing" type.

=== Palaces and residences ===
The main current palaces and residences of the Casbah include Dar Aziza, Dar Hassan Pacha, Palais Mustapha Pacha, Palais Ahmed Bey, Palais El Hamra, Dar Khedaoudj el Amia, Dar El Kadi, Dar Soltan, the Maison du Millénaire, the Palais des Raïs, Dar Essadaka, and Dar Es Souf. Additionally, the extra-muros palaces of the Fahs of Algiers and residences incorporated as dependencies of public institutions (hospitals, a high school) are part of this heritage.

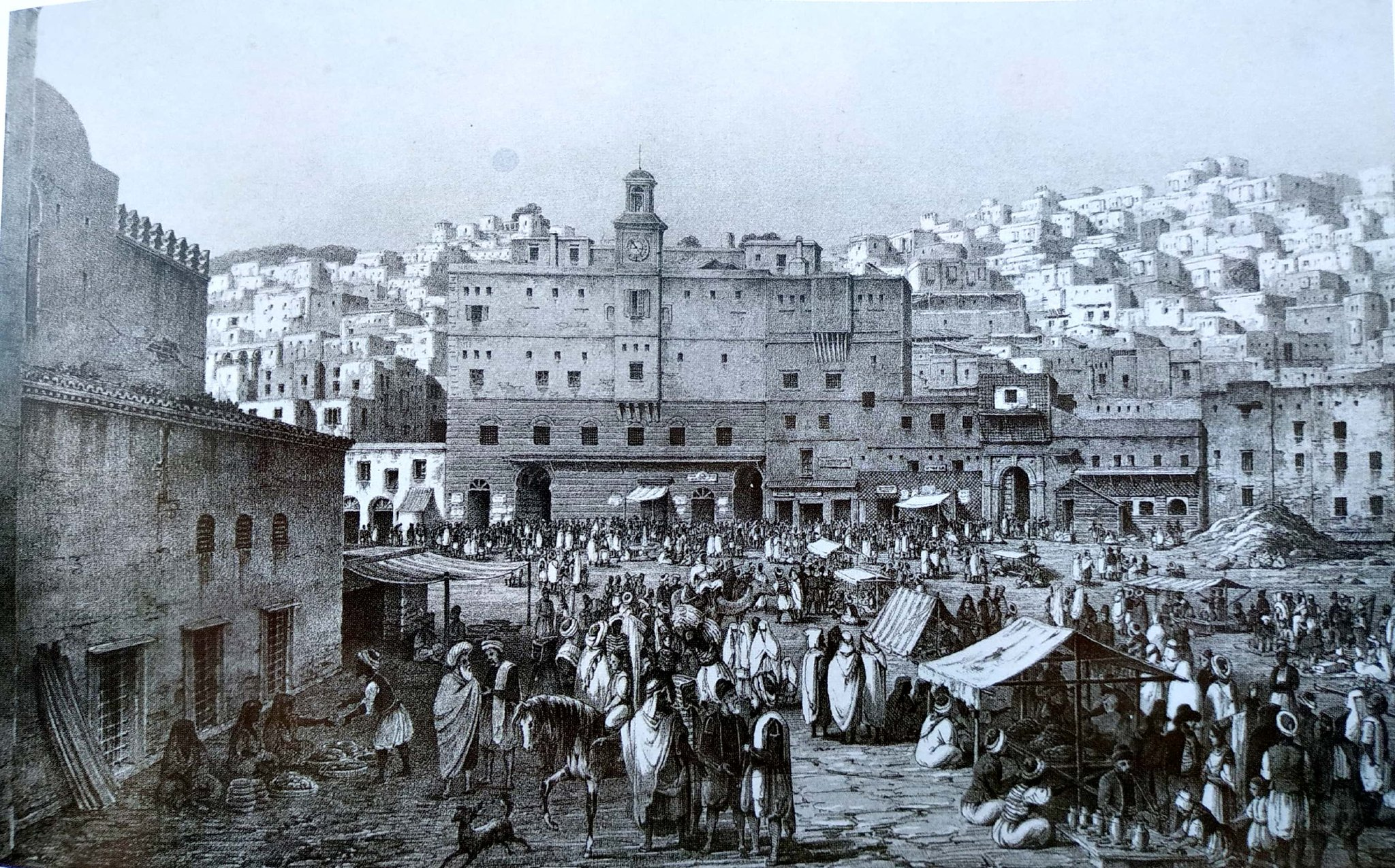
Palais de la Jenina and current Place des Martyrs on an engraving from 1832; the palace was demolished around 1856.

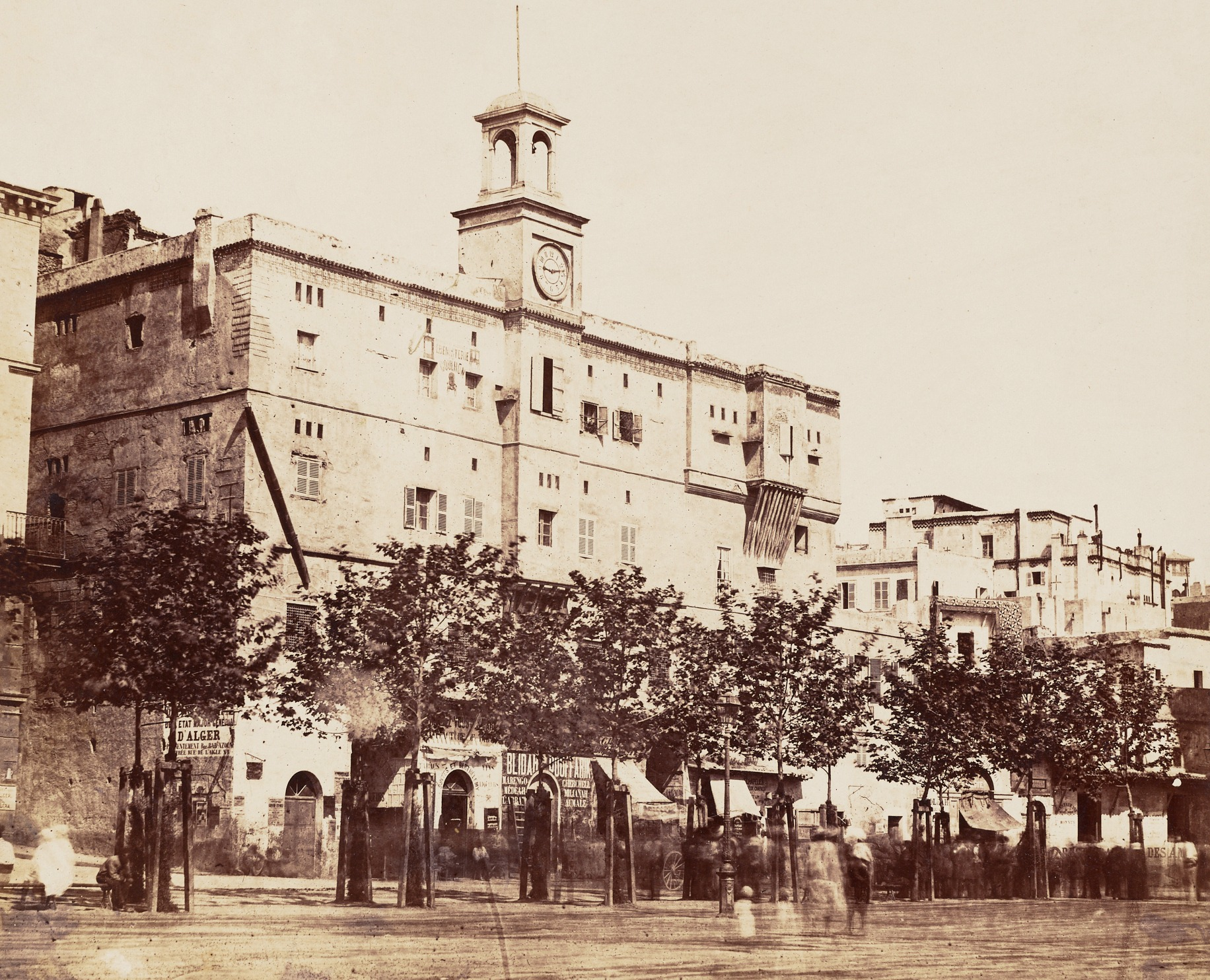
Palace of Jenin in 1856. (albumen print)

The oldest of these palaces is the Jenina, which was ravaged by a fire in 1844. This palace, originally a Berber fort, served as the residence of the local sovereigns of Algiers during the Middle Ages, notably the last one, Salim at-Toumi. It predates the Regency of Algiers, during which it was the seat of power. The people of Algiers called it Dar Soltan el Qedim, and it remained the center of power until 1817. Only part of this complex remains, including Dar Aziza, located on Place des Martyrs, facing the Ketchaoua Mosque. The palace of Dar Aziza is typical of 16th-century Algerian residences. Originally three stories high, it lost its top floor during the 1716 earthquake. It was used as a storage facility in 1830, and in 1832, the staircase leading to the terrace was removed. After some modifications, it became the residence of the archbishop during French colonization. Dar Aziza is rich in wall decorations made of sculpted marble and features a magnificent patio adorned with fountains, woodwork, ceramics, and colored glass screens.

The Palais Mustapha Pacha was built in 1798. One of its unique features is that it contains half a million antique tiles from Algeria, Tunisia, as well as Spain and Italy. The marble of its fountain comes from Italy, and its doors are made of cedar. Today, it houses the Calligraphy Museum of Algiers.

The Palais Hassan Pacha is a Maghrebi-style palace built in 1791. It was modified during the colonial period with neo-Gothic and Orientalist architectural elements.

The Palais Ahmed Bey is located in the Lower Casbah, in the Souk-el-Djemâa district, bordering Hadj Omar Street. It is part of the Jenina palace complex. Built in the 16th century as the dey's residence, it follows the typical architectural style of the period. It now houses the administration of the National Theatre of Algeria.

The Palais des Raïs is one of the last surviving remnants of the medina located by the sea, and it has undergone recent restoration. This palace, once belonging to corsairs, alternates between public and private spaces. It comprises three palatial buildings and six modest dwellings (douerates) decorated with refined elements such as ceramic tiles, wooden balustrades, marble columns, and intricately adorned ceilings. It also includes an old hammam and a menzah (a terrace overlooking the site with a view of the sea). Today, this palace functions as a cultural center.

The palaces of the Kasbah

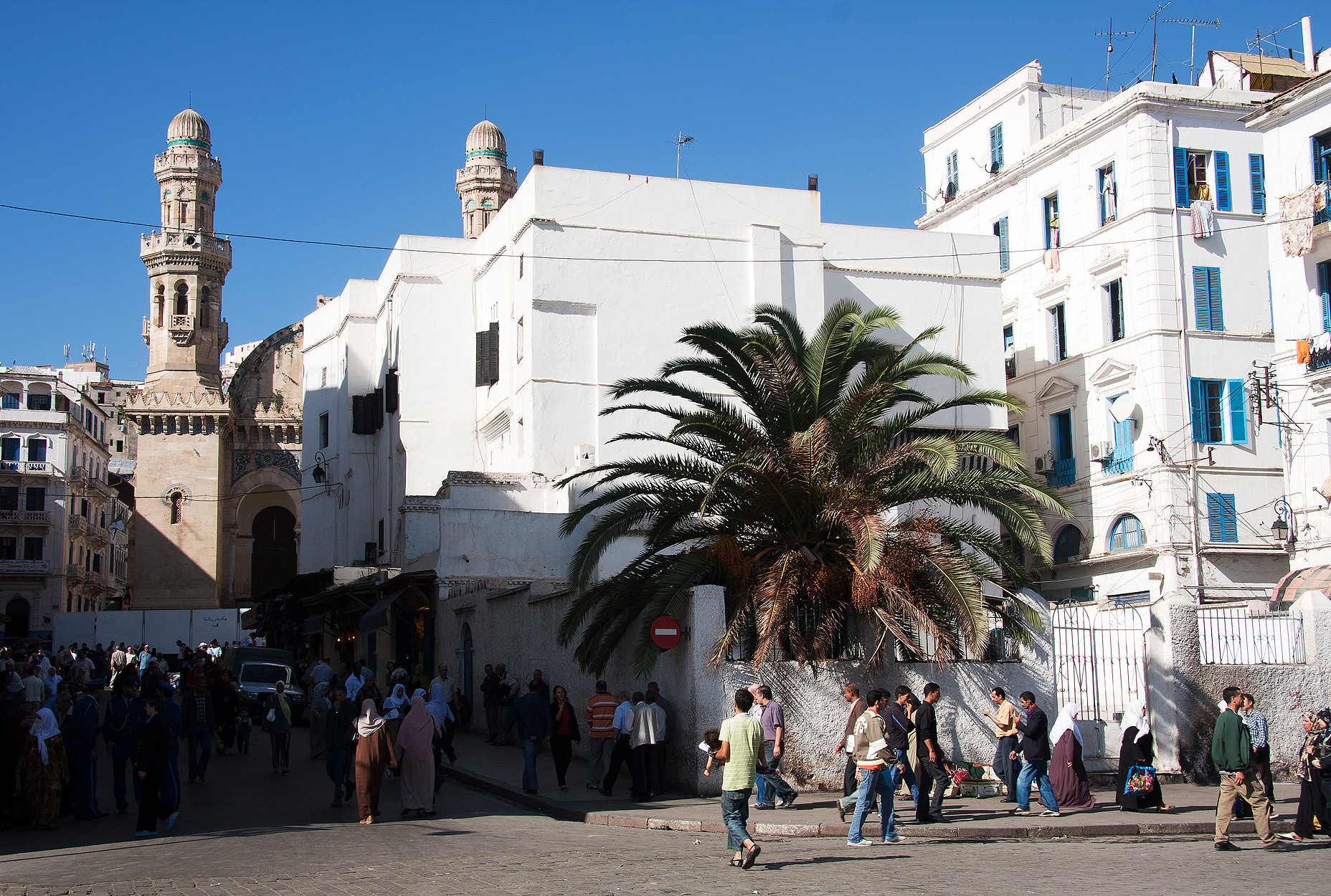
Dar Aziza in the foreground, the last part of the former Djenina palace built in the 16th century and largely destroyed by fire in the 19th century.

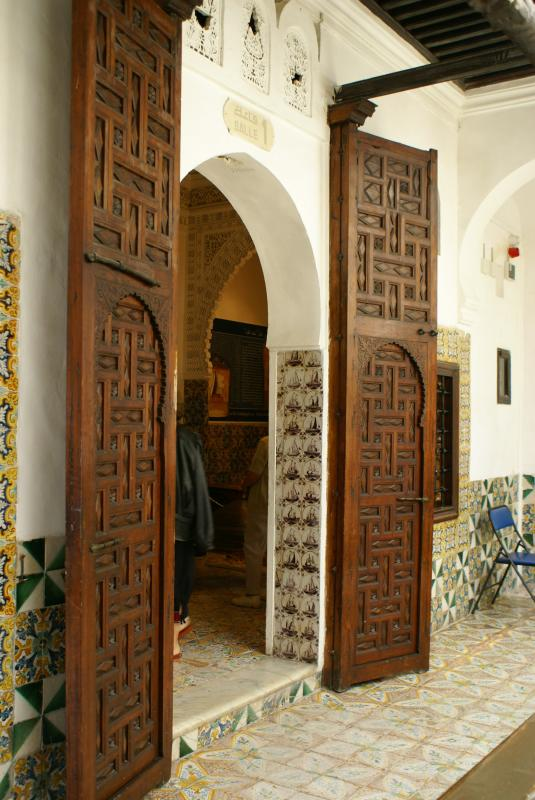
Khdaoudj El Amia Palace, now the "museum of popular arts".

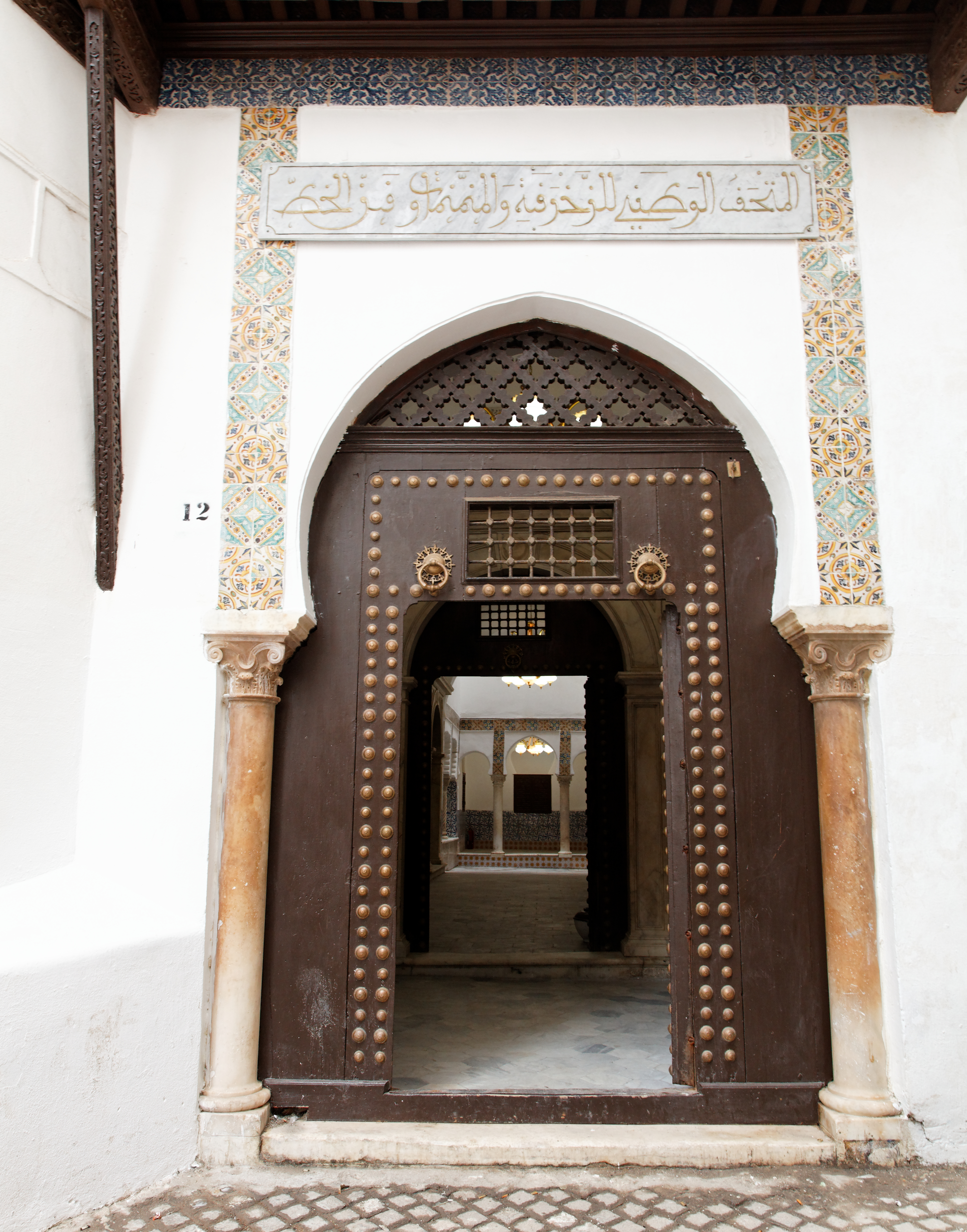
The entrance to the Mustapha Pacha Palace.

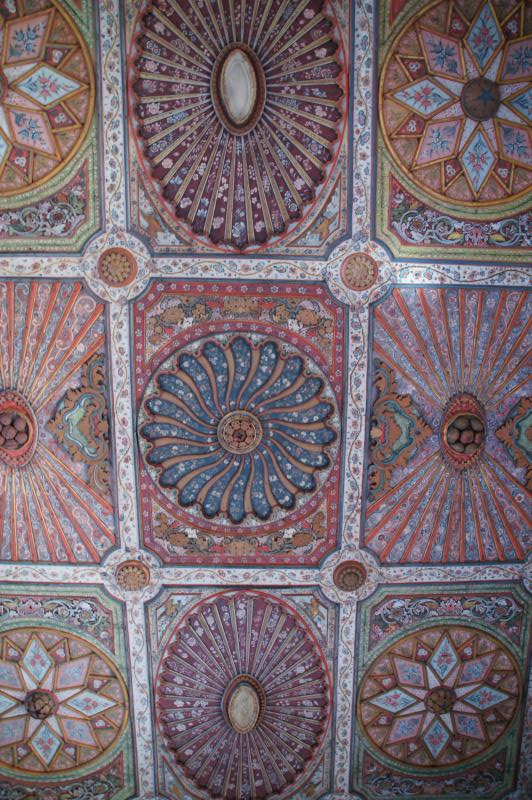
Carved wooden ceiling of the Palais des Raïs.

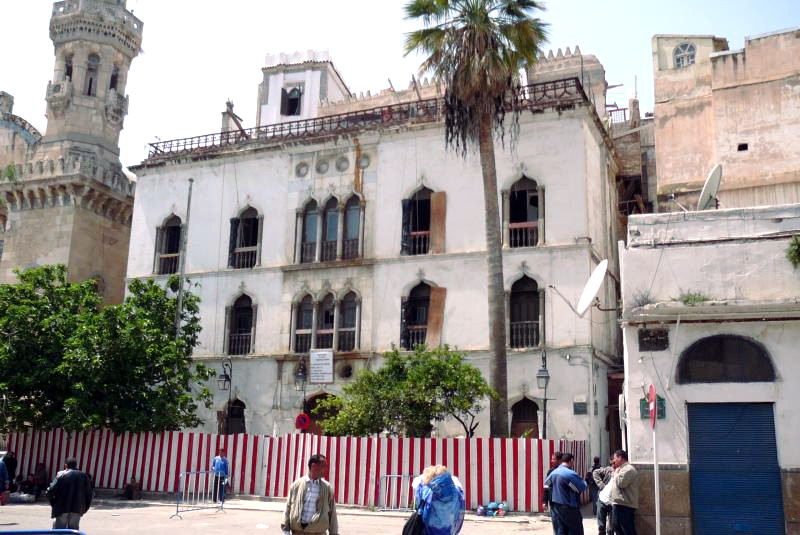
Hassan Pacha Palace, winter residence of the French Governor General of Algeria.

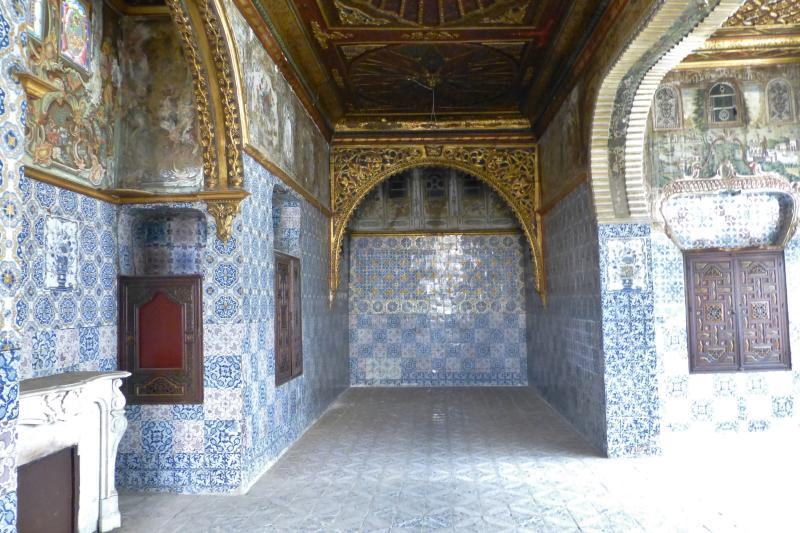
Interior of the Hassan Pacha Palace.

During the Regency of Algiers, many summer palaces were located outside the city walls in the Fahs of Algiers. The Fahs refers to the outskirts and suburbs of the medina and is a distinct space from the main city. It was the site of various summer palaces and residences with gardens. One of the most famous among them is the Bardo Palace, which now houses the Bardo National Museum.

=== Mosques ===
Among the principal mosques of the Casbah of Algiers are Jamaa Ketchaoua, Jamaa el Kebir, Jamaa el Jdid, Jamaa Ali Bitchin, Jamaa Sidi Ramdane, Jamaa Sidi M’hamed Cherif, Jamaa el Berrani, Jamaa el Safir, and Jamaa li Houd.

The oldest mosque in the Casbah of Algiers is Jamaa El Kebir, the Great Mosque, built in 1097 by Yusuf Ibn Tashfin in the Almoravid style. It was constructed at a time when Andalusian artistic influence was strong in the Maghreb. The defining features of this mosque are its prayer hall and minaret. The hypostyle prayer hall is centrally arranged, with powerful pillars connected by large, festooned arches—lobed for the nave and simple, polished for the aisles. The mihrab is decorated with columns and ceramics. The minaret, rebuilt by a Zayyanid sultan of Tlemcen in 1324, is quadrangular, topped with a small lantern, and adorned with ceramics and fine carvings. The external gallery is not original; it was built using marble columns from the demolished Es-Sayida Mosque, which was once located on Place des Martyrs and was destroyed during colonization.

Jamaa Sidi Ramdane is one of the medieval mosques of the medina, dating back to the 11th century.

Jamaa Ketchaoua is a unique structure that stands as a testament to the history of the Casbah. Founded in 1436, before the Regency of Algiers, it was built when Berber dynasties ruled the city. Its architecture blends Moorish, Turkish, and Byzantine styles. The mosque was modified during the Regency and especially during French colonization, when it was converted into a cathedral before being returned to Islamic worship upon Algeria's independence. A larger building was constructed around 1613 under the Regency's rule, and it was further renovated in 1794 under Hassan Pacha's administration. Its architecture was inspired by Turkish mosques built in the Byzantine style. From 1844 onward, under French colonization, modifications were made to adapt it for Catholic use, resulting in the removal of its original Maghrebi-style square minaret and the construction of two façade towers and a choir extending from the prayer hall. The church was classified as a historical monument by the French administration in 1908 and returned to Islamic worship after Algeria's independence.

Jamaa al-Jdid is one of the more recent mosques, built in 1660 by Dey Mustapha Pacha in a style reminiscent of the Ottomans. It features domes similar to those found in Istanbul. However, its 27-meter-high minaret is in the Maghrebi style with a distinctive feature: since 1853, it has had a clock taken from the old Jenina Palace, which was demolished during the colonial period. It was designated for the Turks in the city, following the Hanafi rite, and its proximity to the sea earned it the nickname "the Fishermen's Mosque." According to legend, a Christian captive designed its plans, which would explain its Latin cross shape. Its interior is adorned with woodwork, and its minbar is made of Italian marble.

Jamaa el Berrani, literally "the Mosque of Foreigners," was built in 1653 and rebuilt in 1818 by Hussein Dey at the foot of the Algiers citadel to serve as the Agha's tribunal. It was named after the foreigners who came to pray there before their audience with the dey. Later, it was converted into a Catholic place of worship during part of the colonial period.

Mosques of the Casbah of Algiers

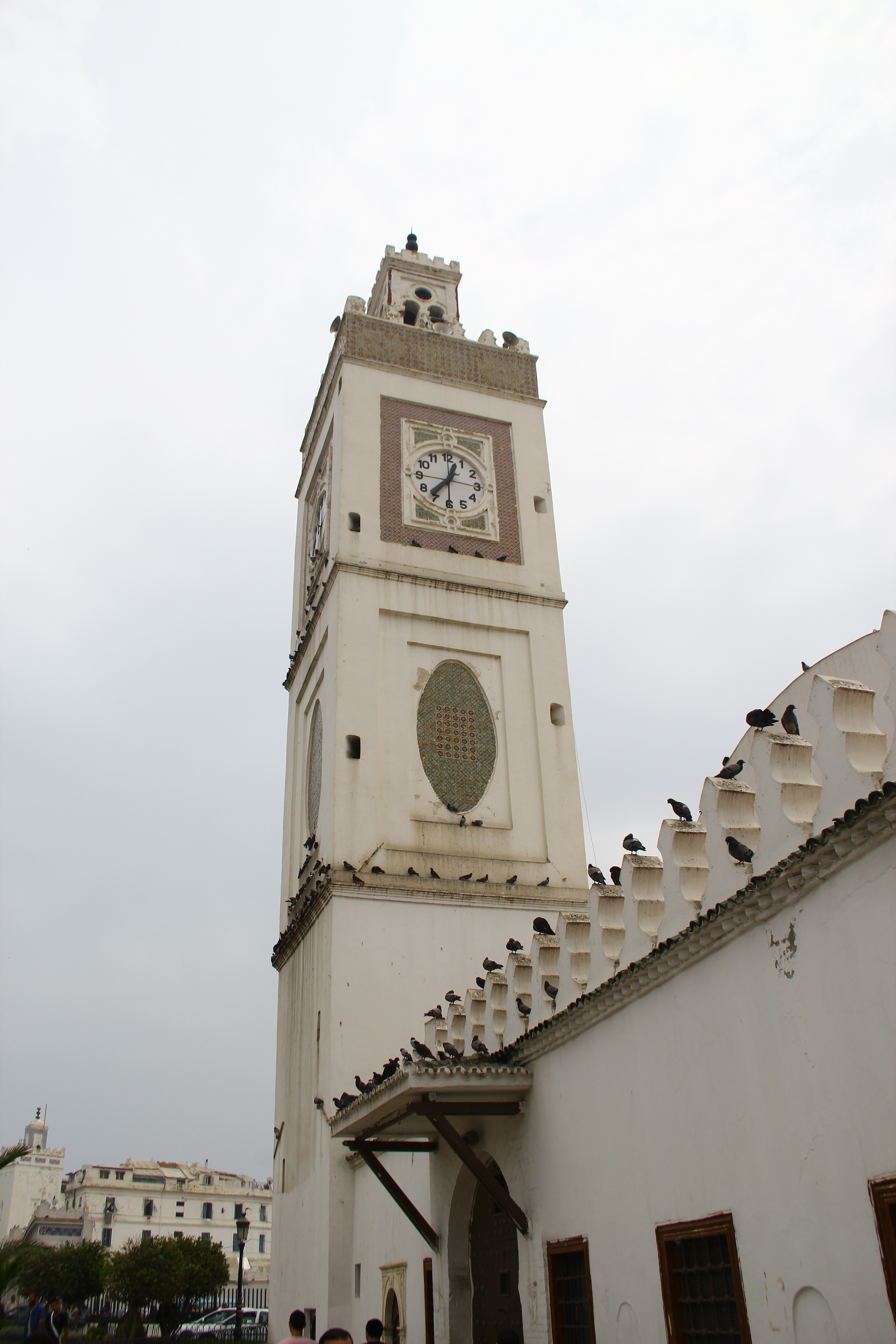
Jamaa al-Jdid mosque, built in 1660.

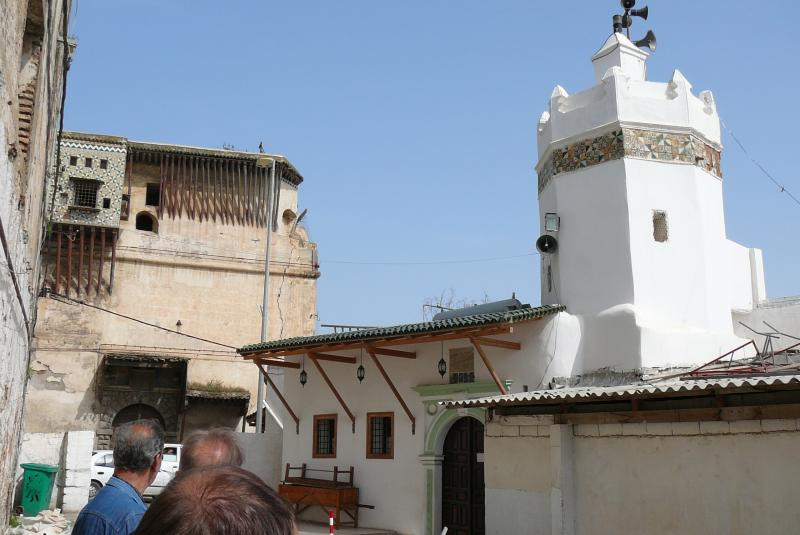
Jamaa Berrani; in the background, the dey's palace.

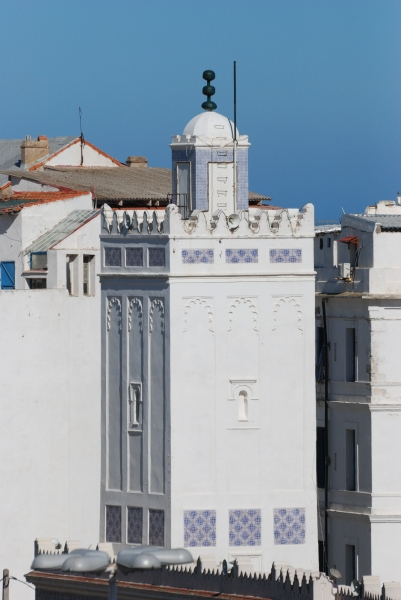
The minaret of the Jamaa el Kébir mosque, in the Zayyanid style.

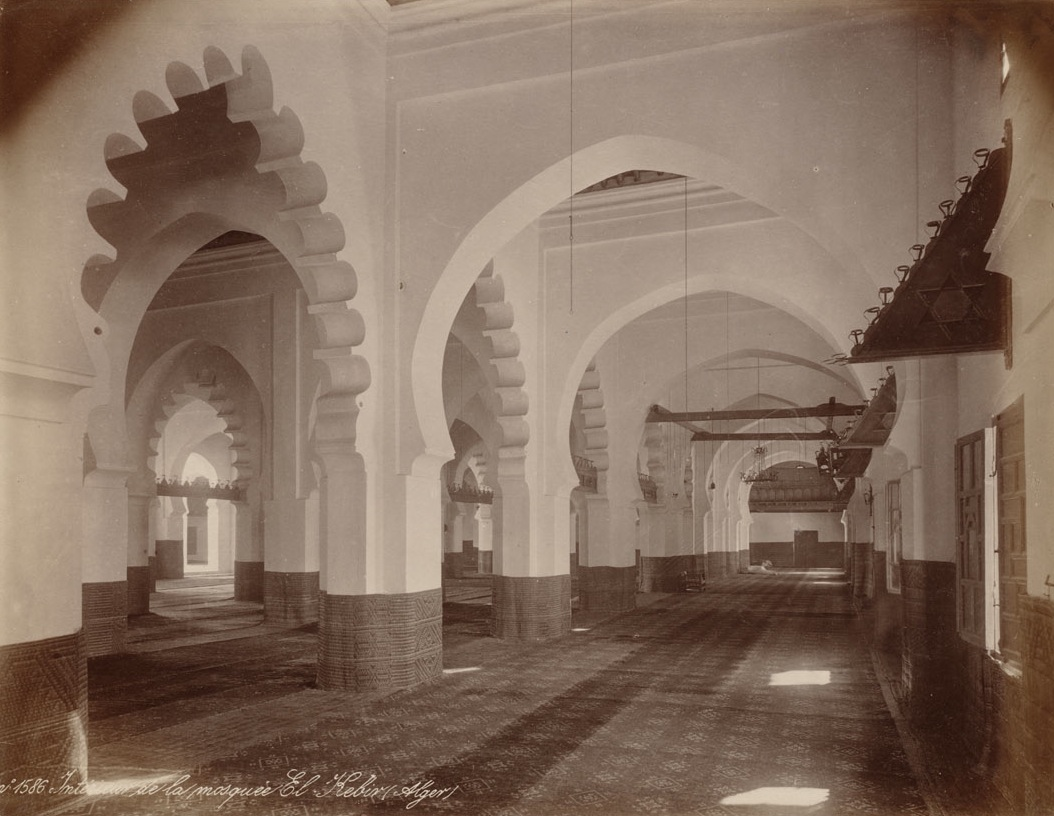
Interior of Jamaa el Kébir, a testament to Hispano-Moorish and Almoravid art (c.1892).

The Casbah also has many small mosques, such as the Ali Bitchin Mosque, built by a Venetian renegade who converted to Islam, whose real name was Picenio. This mosque was constructed in 1622 by the wealthy merchant. It follows the Ottoman architectural style, featuring numerous domes, but also includes a square-shaped Maghrebi minaret. Originally, its prayer hall was unadorned, with walls simply whitewashed. Over time, however, stucco and other interior decorations were added. Currently, the building is undergoing restoration. Other mosques were built near mausoleums, such as the Jamaa Sidi Abderrahmane, erected beside the mausoleum of the same name in 1696. This mosque features domes and a richly decorated minaret.

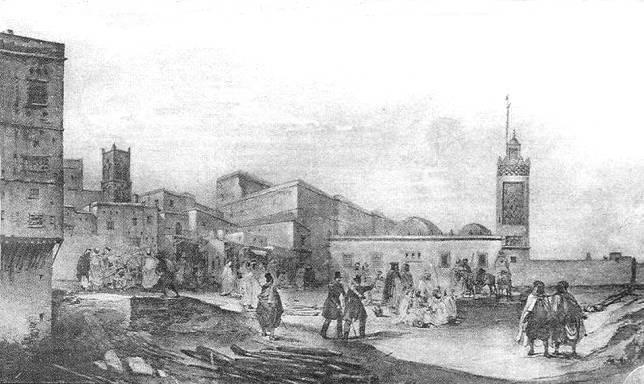
Engraving representing the Es-Sayida Mosque (c.1830), demolished during the colonial period.

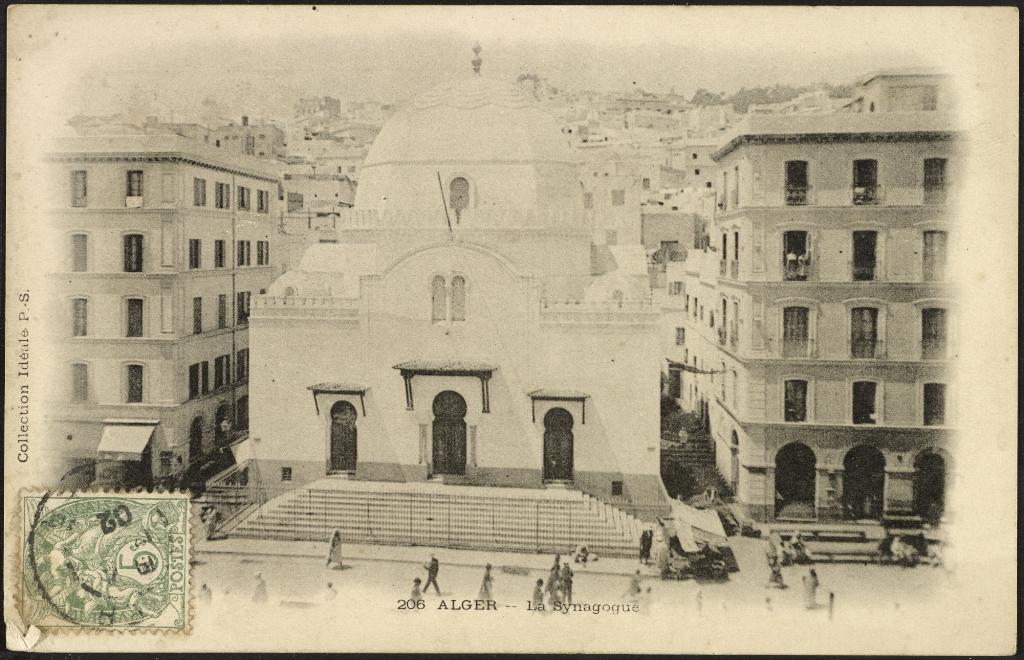
The former Great Synagogue of Algiers, Jamaa li houd, became a mosque (c.1902).

The Casbah also had mosques that were demolished during the colonial period, leaving a lasting mark on the city's memory. Among them was the Es-Sayida Mosque (Mosque of the Lady), formerly located at Place des Martyrs, which was demolished in 1832. Its colonnades were repurposed to create the peristyle of Jamaa el Kebir, the Great Mosque, in 1836, as an attempt to compensate for the unpopularity of its demolition and colonial modifications.

Other mosques, such as the M'sella Mosque near Bab el Oued (demolished in 1862), Jamaa Mezzomorto (built by Dey Mezzomorto), Jamaa m'ta Sattina Maryam, and "Notre Dame Maryam" (destroyed in 1837), were also lost due to various urban developments. Jamaa li Houd, known as the "Mosque of the Jews," was originally a synagogue built between 1850 and 1865. It was converted into a mosque after the country's independence, following the departure of the local Jewish community.

=== Madrasas and mausoleums ===
The Casbah contains several madrasas, the most well-known being the Thaâlibiyya Madrasa. It was built in 1904 under the administration of Governor Charles Jonnart, who promoted the neo-Moorish architectural style, sometimes referred to as "Jonnart style." This style is also seen in several contemporary buildings, such as the Grand Post Office of Algiers and the Oran train station. The madrasa was constructed in honor of the renowned 14th-century Maghrebi theologian Sidi Abderrahmane, considered the patron saint of Algiers. Before colonization, the Casbah had around eighty zawiyas and madrasas, most of which are no longer in use, while some have been converted into mosques, such as the Zawiya of Sidi M'hamed Cherif.

The Casbah is also home to several maraboutic figures, including Sidi Brahim, protector of the sea, whose tomb is located in the admiralty; Sidi M'hamed Chérif, known for his famous fountain; Sidi H'lal, the saint of Bab el Oued; and Sidi Bouguedour, considered the "chief of marabouts". The mausoleums of Sidi H'lal, Sidi Bouguedour, and Sidi Abderrahmane, along with the mosque of Sidi M'hamed Cherif, are currently undergoing restoration.

Thaâlibiyya Madrasa was built near the tomb of Sidi Abderrahmane. The mausoleum surrounding his tomb was erected in the 17th century and even received a visit from Queen Victoria, who, moved by the site's grace, donated crystal chandeliers that still adorn the tomb today. Sidi Abderrahmane is regarded as the patron saint of Algiers, and his richly decorated mausoleum features calligraphic inscriptions of Quranic verses on the walls.

This mausoleum, which includes a mosque with an outdoor cemetery, serves both religious and funerary functions. The cemetery also houses the tomb of Sidi Ouali, a saint from the East, whose legend claims he unleashed the sea against Charles V's ships during the Siege of Algiers in 1541. Other notable figures buried there include saints such as Walî Dada, Sidi Mansour ben Mohamed ben Salîm, and Sidi 'Abd Allah; rulers of the Regency of Algiers, including Ahmed Bey of Constantine and deys Moustapha Pacha and Omar Pacha; as well as renowned personalities like writer Mohamed Bencheneb (1869–1929) and the distinguished miniature painter and illuminator Mohamed Racim (1896–1975).

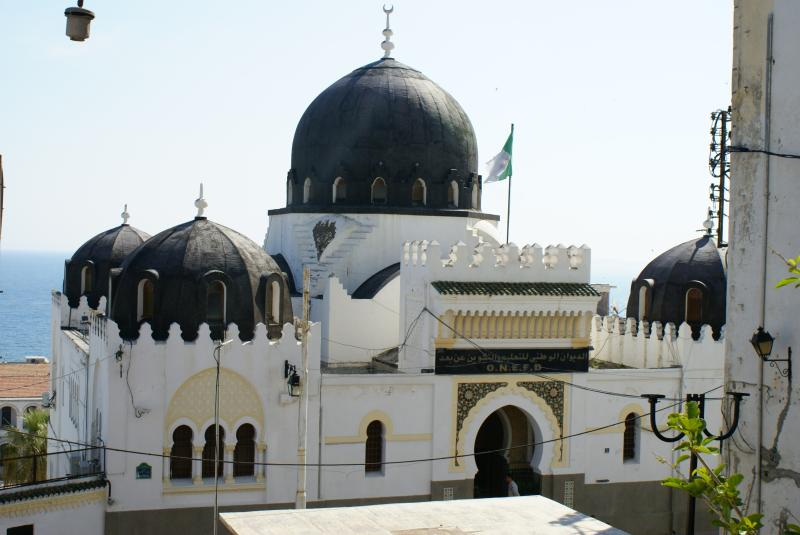
The medersa Thaâlibiyya, built in a neo-Moorish style in 1904.

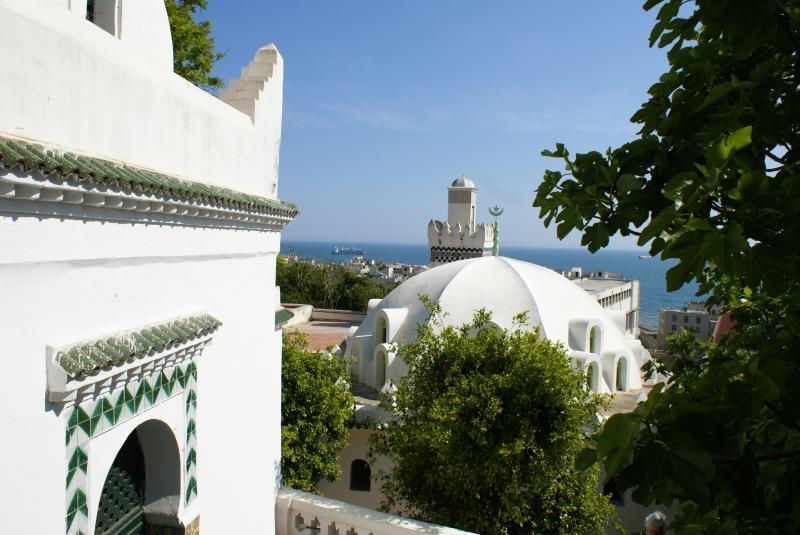
Mausoleum of Sidi Abderrahmane, serving as a small mosque and cemetery. Some of the rulers of the Regency of Algiers and religious dignitaries are buried there.

=== Citadel and defensive structures ===
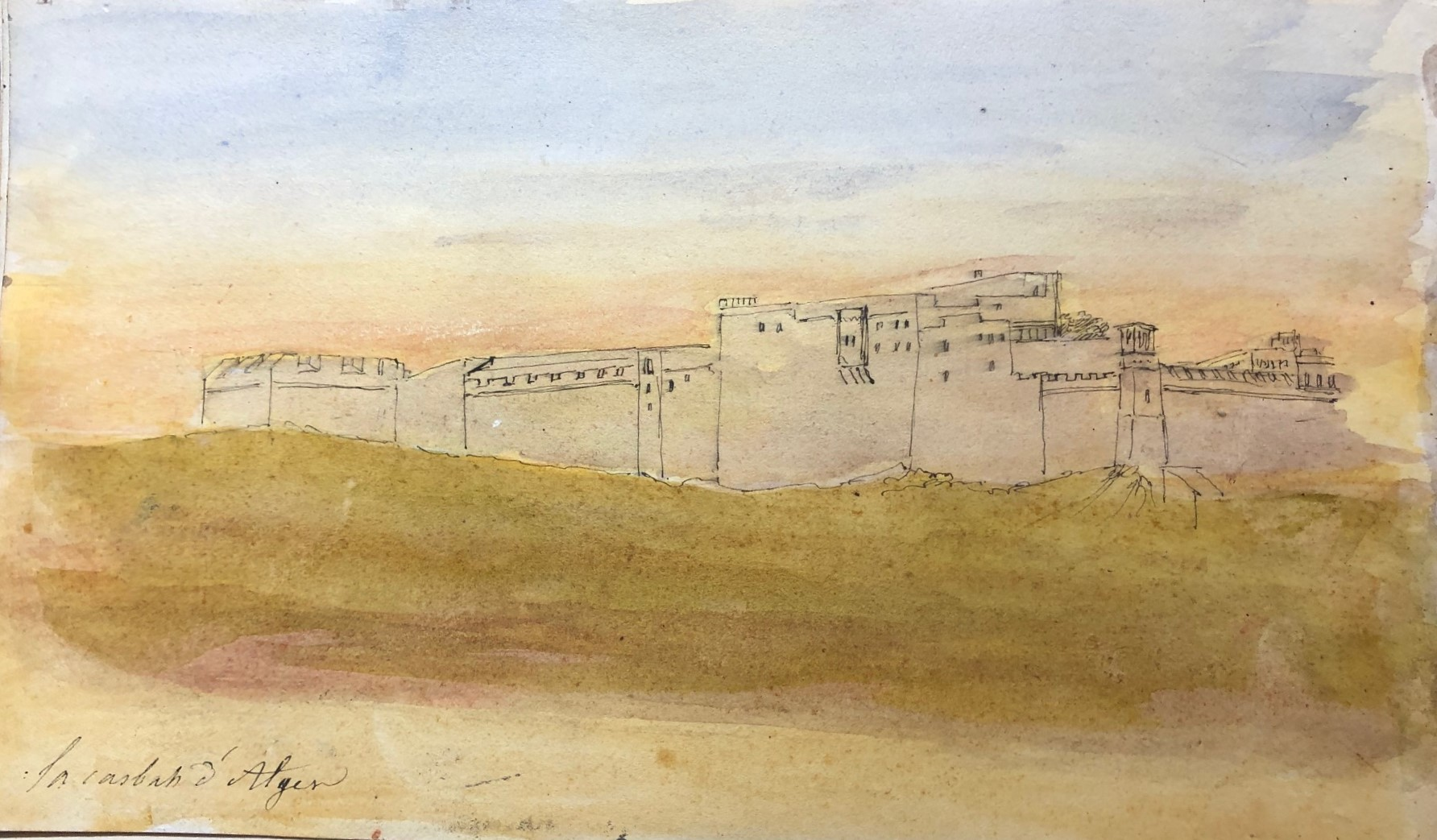
The Kasbah of Algiers by Charles Frédéric Chassériau.

The citadel, which is the true heart of the Casbah, is situated on the heights of the medina, covering an area of 9,000 square meters, of which 7,500 square meters are built-up. Its construction dates back to 1597, on the site of a former Zirid establishment. It became the seat of the dey's power in 1817.

This complex includes:

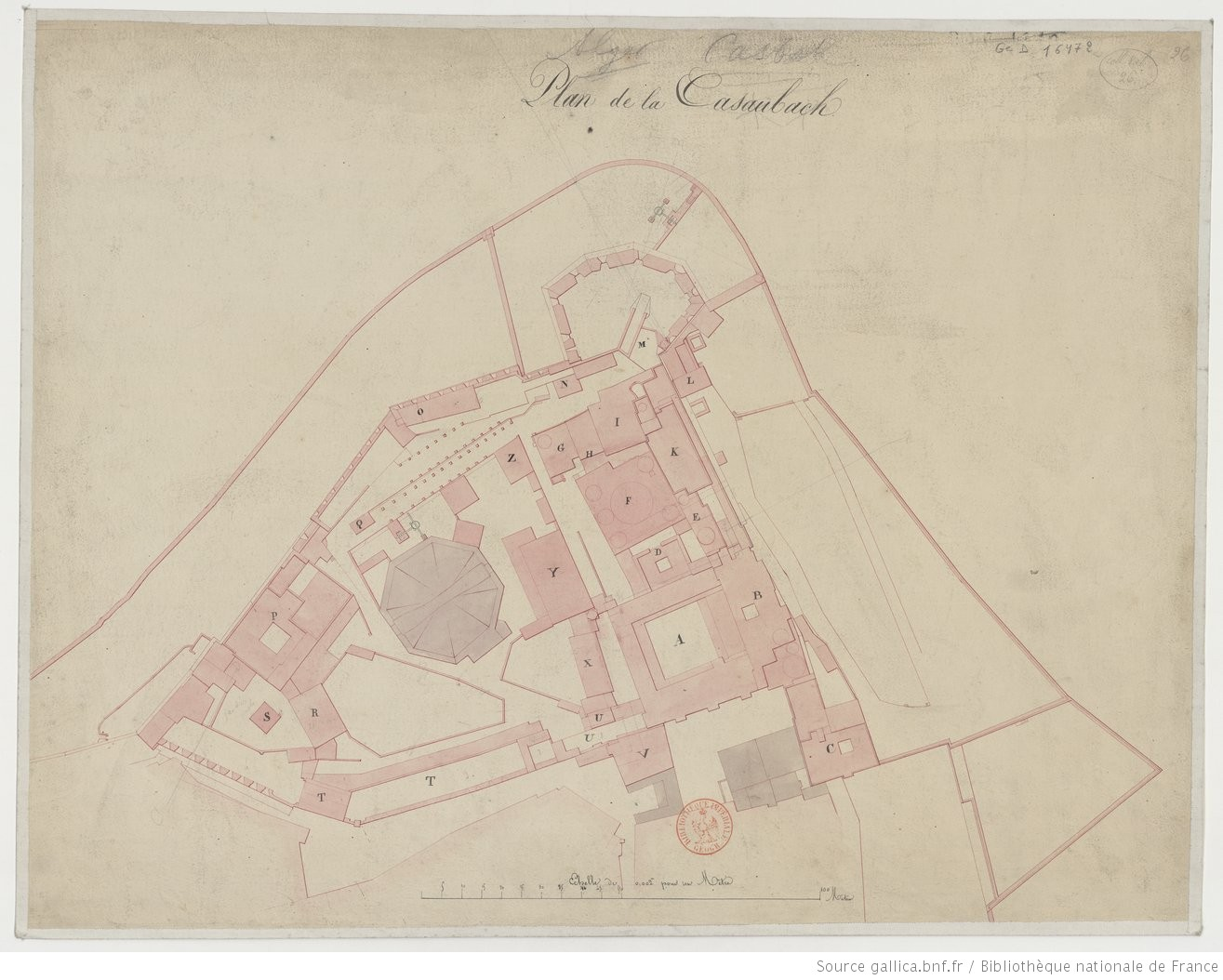
Plan of the citadel (1830). A-palace of the Dey; P-palace of the Beys; F-mosque of the Dey; Y-mosque of the Janissaries; I, K -Harem.

- The dey's palace
- A palace designated for the beys of Constantine, Oran, and Médéa, who were vassals of the dey
- Two mosques, one for the dey and the other for the Janissaries
- A gunpowder factory, used for producing saltpeter and gunpowder
- The remains of casemates and a former garden that housed exotic trees, rare plants, and an aviary for rare birds
- Bastions and ramparts
- An old harem
- A summer pavilion
- The Agha baths
- A summer garden
- A winter garden
- The ostrich park

During the colonial period, the French fragmented the citadel complex to build a road, now known as Mohamed Taleb Street. As of 2015, the Algiers citadel remains under restoration.

The "Kasbah" - Citadel of Algiers

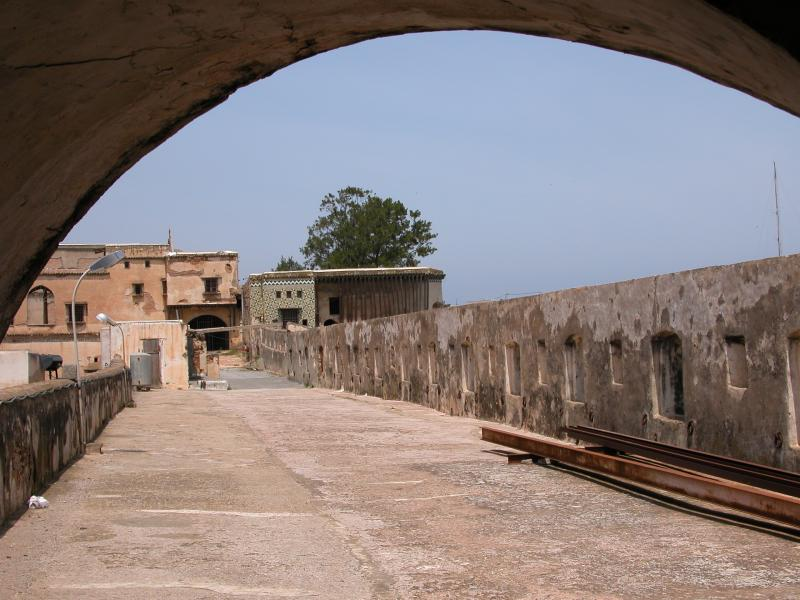
View of the fortifications of the citadel, which gives the old town its name of Casbah.

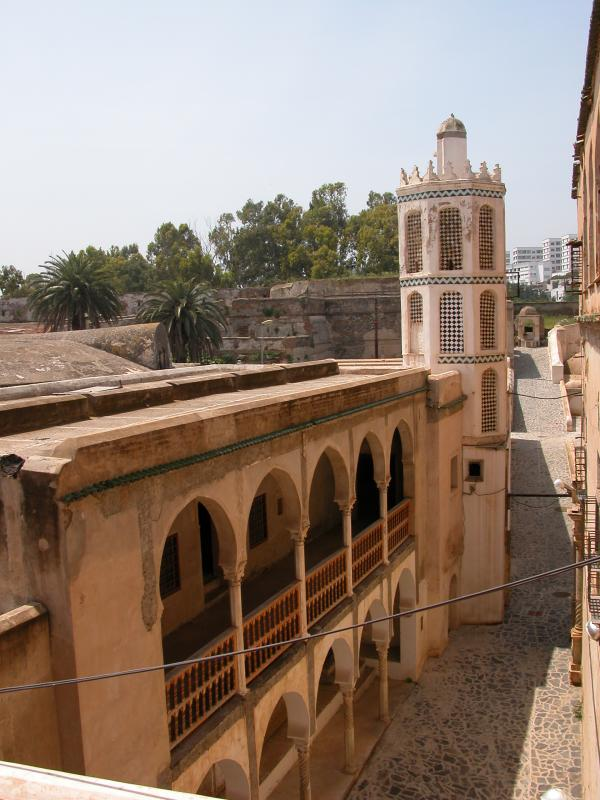
View of the citadel minaret.

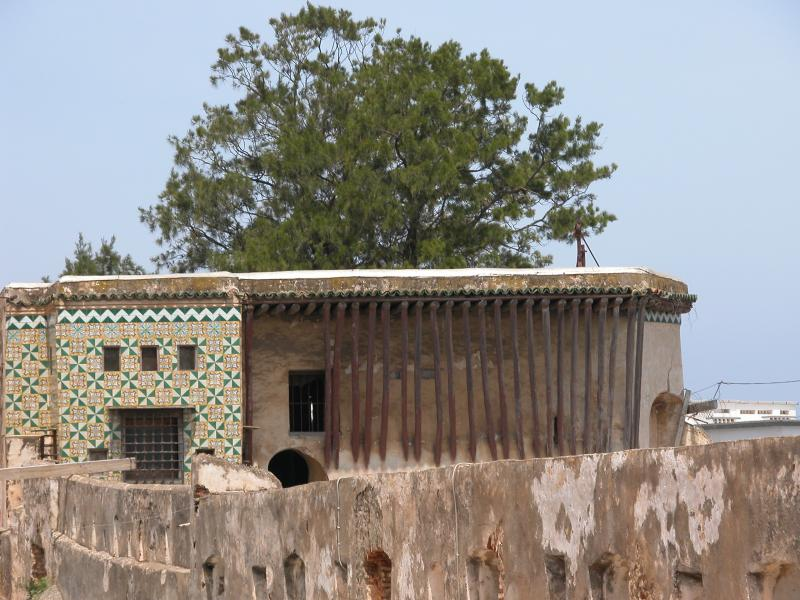
View of part of the Dar Soltan palace, palace of the last Dey of Algiers.

However, the citadel was not the city's only defensive structure. Originally, Algiers was surrounded by a wall punctuated by gates: Bab Azoun, Bab el Oued, Bab Jedid, and Bab Jezira. A broader network of forts (borj), built between the 16th and 17th centuries, provided additional defense. These included El Fanar in the port, Moulay Hasan (or Fort l'Empereur) in the hinterland, and Tamentfoust on the opposite side of Algiers Bay. Borj El Fanar still exists, along with the admiralty forts, though many others were demolished during the colonial era. On the waterfront, one of the last remnants of the city's historical structures is the Palais des Raïs. Its imposing seaside facade is still equipped with cannons aimed at the sea. The Casbah was originally enclosed by a defensive wall, of which only ruins remain, such as those opposite Serkadji prison.

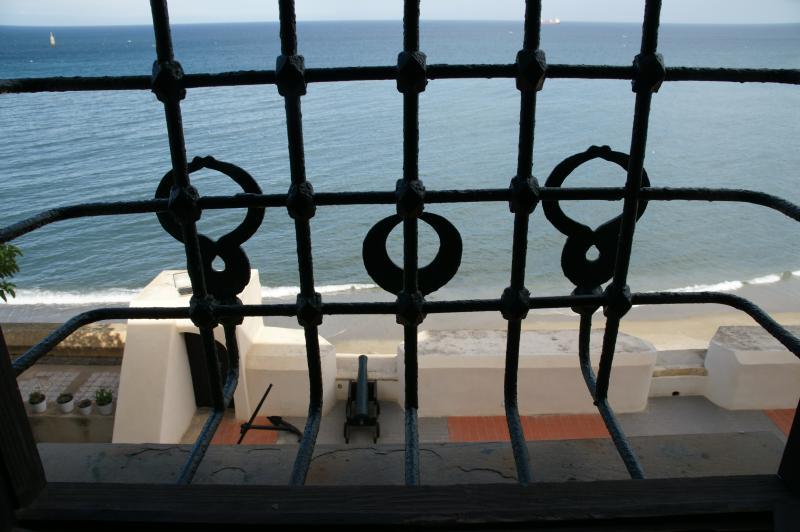
Battery of the Palais de Raïs.

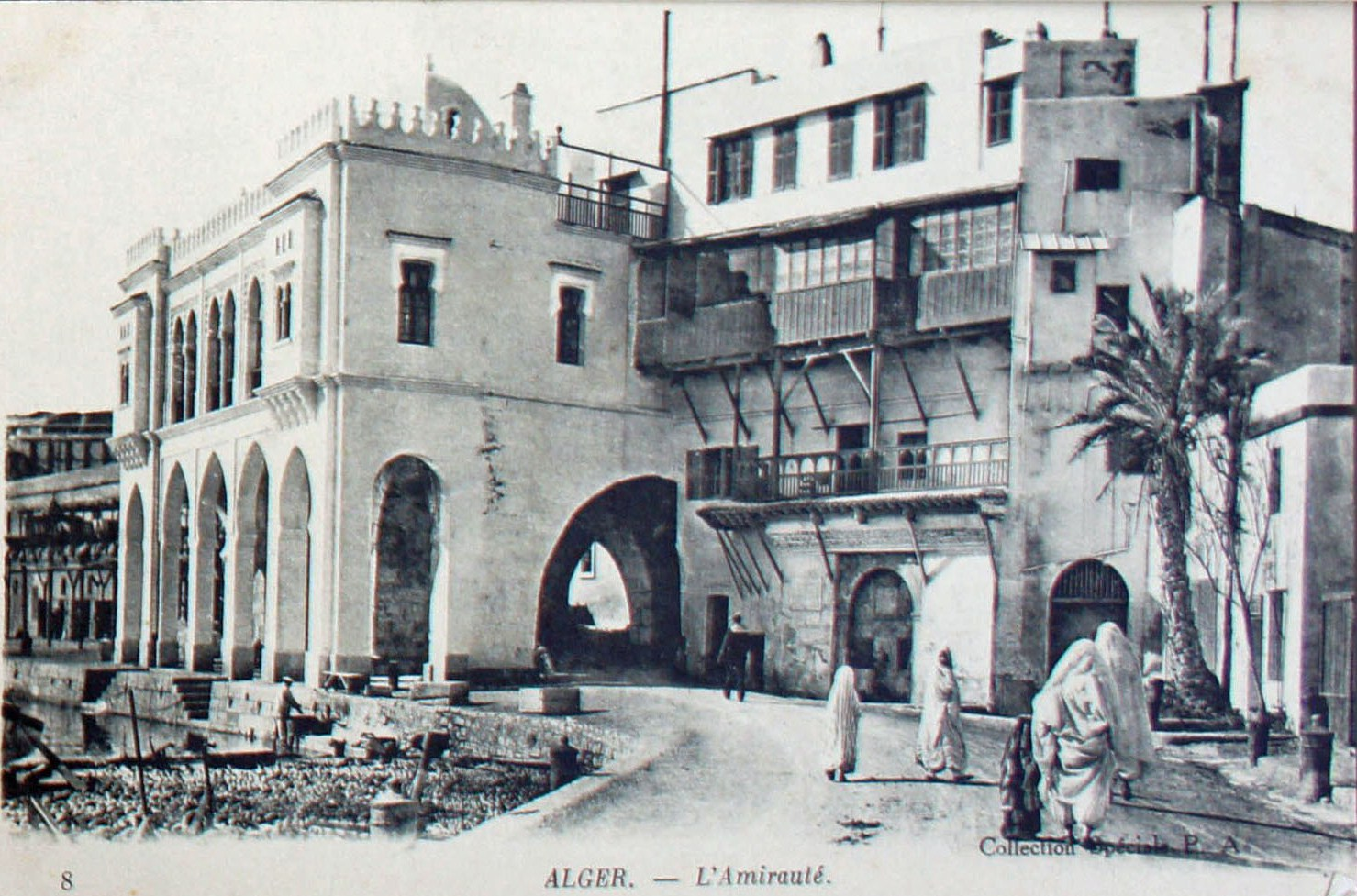
Borj el Fanar (c.1916), seat of Captan Raïs, harbour master, and of the Oukil el Hardj, minister of the navy during the period of the regency of Algiers.

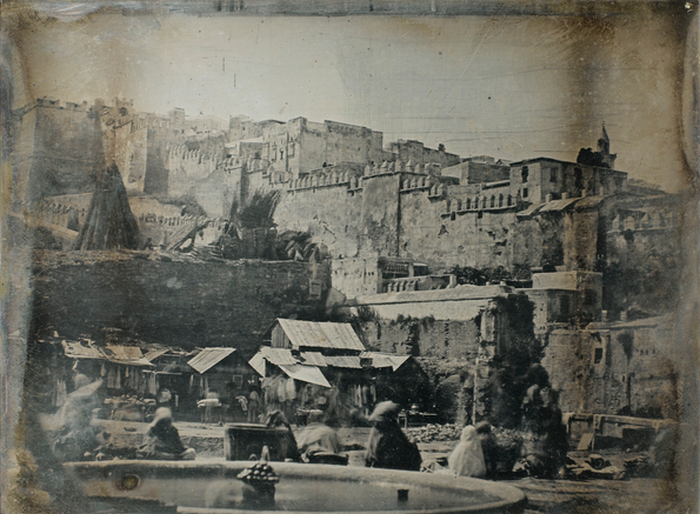
The ramparts of Algiers on the south-eastern side in the 19th century before their demolition.

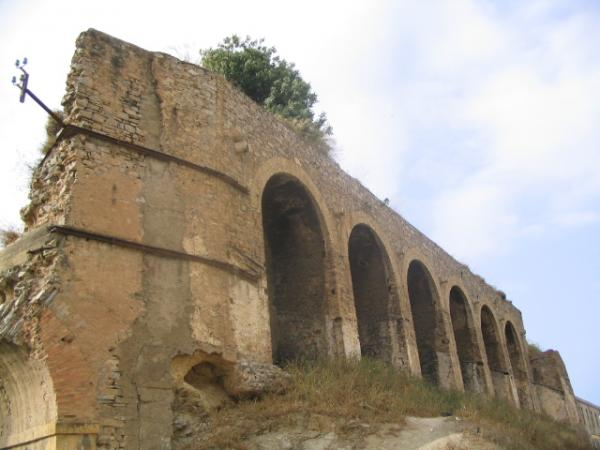
The ramparts, on the western side of the medina.

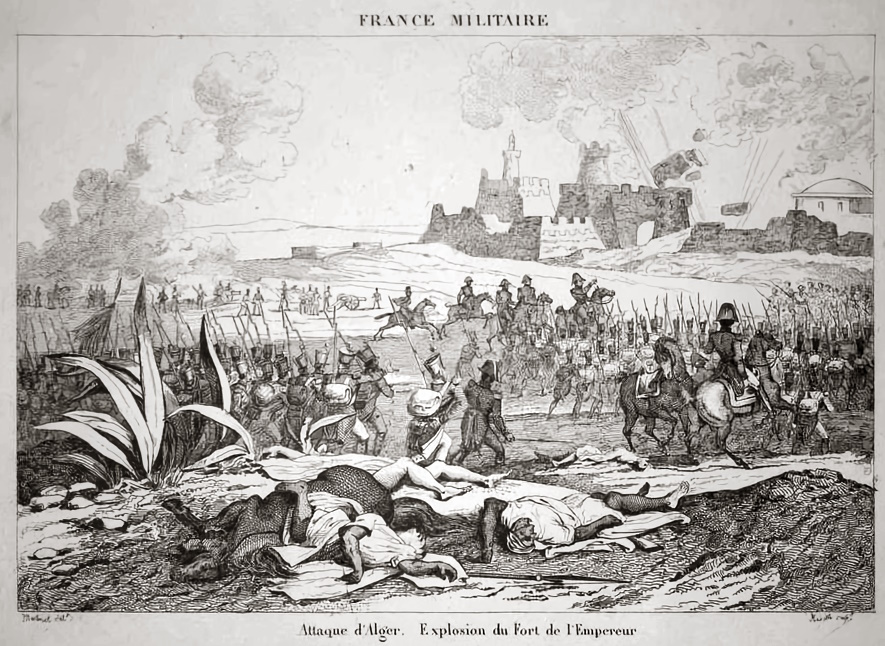
Explosion of the Borj Moulay Hassan or Emperor's Fort, in 1830, sabotaged by the Janissaries during the capture of Algiers.

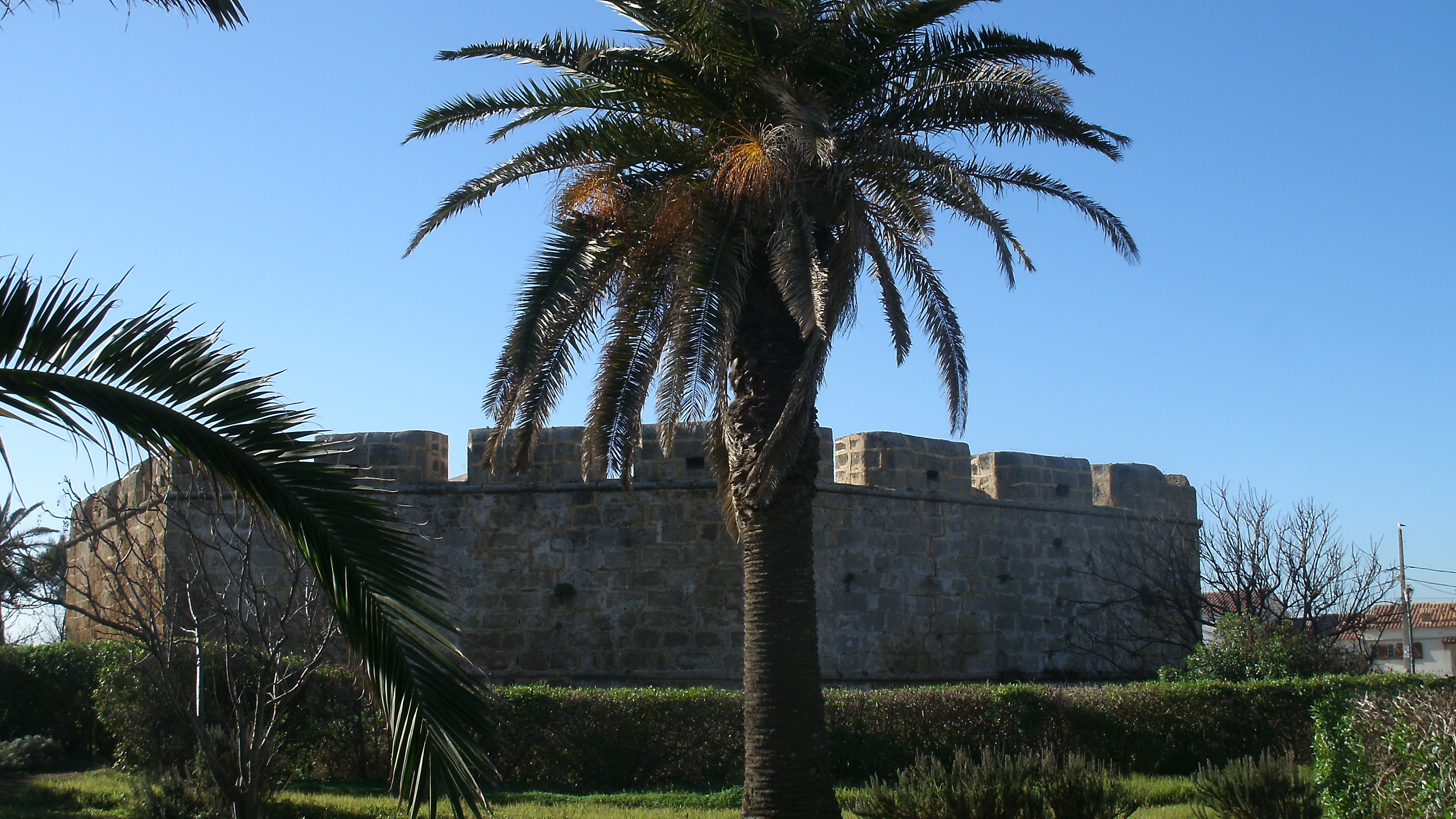
Borj Tamentfoust, located opposite the Algiers Bay.

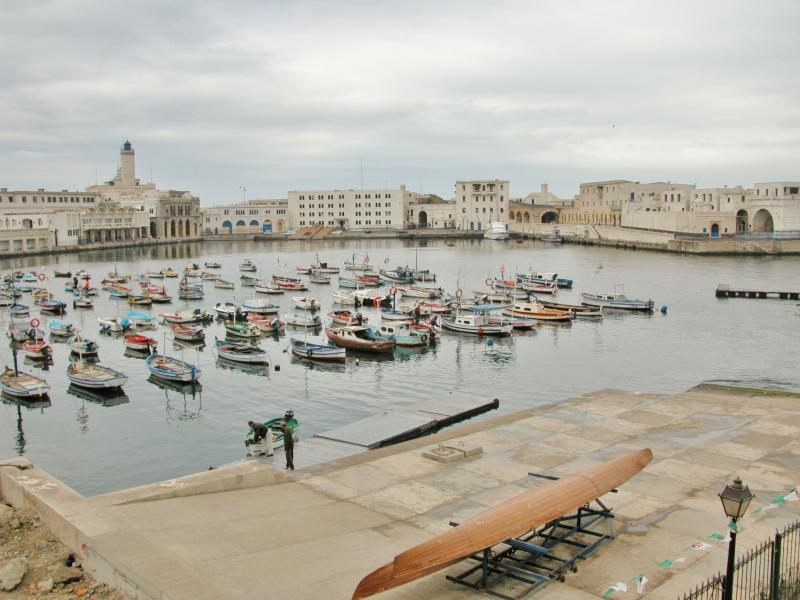
The admiralty of Algiers, the harbor and the various borjs that make it up. In the background, the octagonal building of the Peñon rock (dating from the 16th century) topped by the lighthouse tower.

=== Urban decay and social decline ===
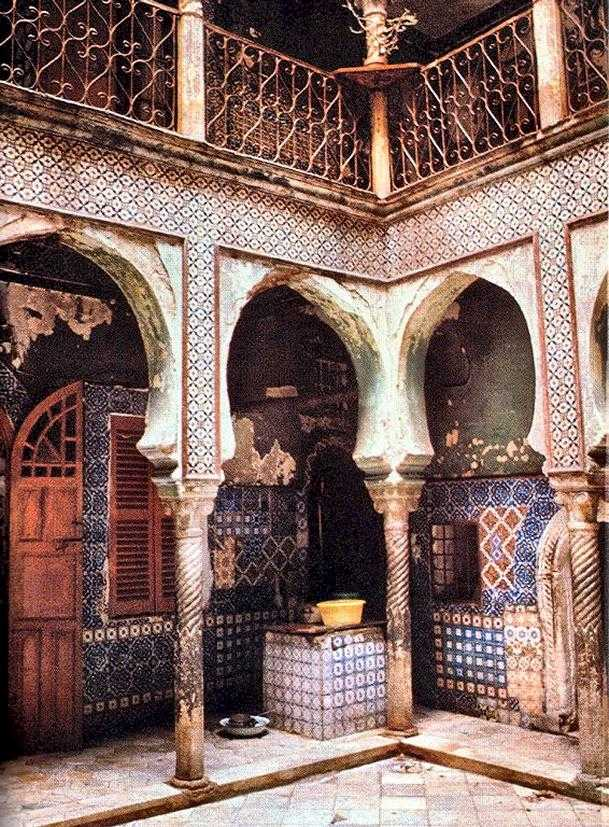
A dilapidated house in the Kasbah.

The Casbah faces challenges related to its status as an inhabited heritage site. Since the colonial period, it has been relegated to the background, progressively losing its role as the city's urban center. Demolitions have taken place to make way for new urban planning. During the colonial era, the old city was seen as an outdated, dangerous place—a haven for outcasts and home to a poor population. However, aside from demolitions in the lower Casbah and the construction of peripheral neighborhoods, the urban fabric remained largely intact, as the residents developed a form of communal management of both public and private spaces. This was in resistance to the Haussmannian urban planning model imposed by the colonial authorities.

In the post-independence evolution, the role of the inhabitants has been contradictory. Since 1962, the Casbah has become a zone of relegation and social decline. The maintenance of public spaces has lost its effectiveness due to the dwindling number of zabalines (garbage collectors) and siyakines (sprinklers who cleaned the streets with seawater), leading to an accumulation of waste and rubble. These deteriorations are partly due to the upheaval of the medina's population, as many residents arrived after independence without any "urban experience". The Casbah has also faced the exodus of some of its former inhabitants, the beldiya or "city dwellers". Additionally, the role of the Algerian state must be emphasized, as it has pursued an inadequate urban policy, with no administration establishing itself in the Casbah between 1962 and 1985. Consequently, the medina has continued to lose its urban centrality. After independence, the Casbah also became a refuge for migrants from rural areas, serving as an entry point into the city. It turned into a veritable urban ghetto, a repelling space that, paradoxically, lies at the heart of a city offering no practical centrality. The Casbah's population has thus been composed of the most disadvantaged layers of Algiers' society, while the housing crisis has perpetuated the district's overpopulation. Additionally, a cultural and identity crisis has emerged, with the introduction of concrete into houses and the loss of function of certain architectural features, such as the patio (west dar), which has been bypassed by new room-to-room connections. The patio was traditionally a gathering place for interconnected families. However, as it is now occupied by families who do not know each other and are reluctant to share their privacy with neighbors, these patios have lost part of their original purpose. Paradoxically, preservation plans that focus on palaces and bourgeois houses have allowed the overall urban fabric to deteriorate—terrace continuity has been disrupted, ceramics have disappeared, etc. This reflects a narrow vision of heritage from an administration that perceives the complex urban space as cumbersome. However, restoration efforts are increasingly incorporating the concept of social rehabilitation.

The insecurity and isolation of the neighborhood contribute to social marginalization, which in turn fuels the degradation of the urban environment. About 76% of the properties are privately owned, often as undivided estates (biens habous), complicating the financing of restoration and maintenance efforts. This legal situation hinders state intervention. Action plans are repeatedly implemented using the same methods, leading to repeated failures on the ground. This explains why heritage restoration has remained stalled for decades. Of the 1,200 Moorish-style houses recorded in 1962, only fifty have been restored, approximately 250 have collapsed, and 400 are sealed off and unoccupied—although about 50% have been illegally reoccupied.

The repeated failure of rehabilitation plans is attributed to the lack of a comprehensive vision that includes the perspectives of residents and key local actors, such as associations and the oldest inhabitants of the medina. Since these groups have not been involved in various rehabilitation projects since independence, many efforts have been compromised. Additionally, projects are often assigned to foreign firms that struggle to integrate local architectural knowledge, reflecting what some perceive as a "colonized complex" within Algerian authorities, who appear unable to mobilize local expertise. Meanwhile, community organizations protest what they call a "culture of forgetting", but their concrete actions remain limited.

==== 2018-2019: Rehabilitation project and controversy ====
In the late 2010s, the Île-de-France region—twinned with the Wilaya of Algiers—provided financial support for a Casbah rehabilitation project led by architect Jean Nouvel. This sparked criticism, with a petition signed by 400 Algerians (mainly from the diaspora) denouncing the fact that he was from the former colonial power. In Le Huffington Post, architect Kamel Louafi sharply responded: "All these signatories who act and work outside their country deny Jean Nouvel this right and ask him to let Algerian colleagues take care of the Casbah, as if intelligence were determined by birth or ethnicity."

== Culture ==
=== Handicrafts ===
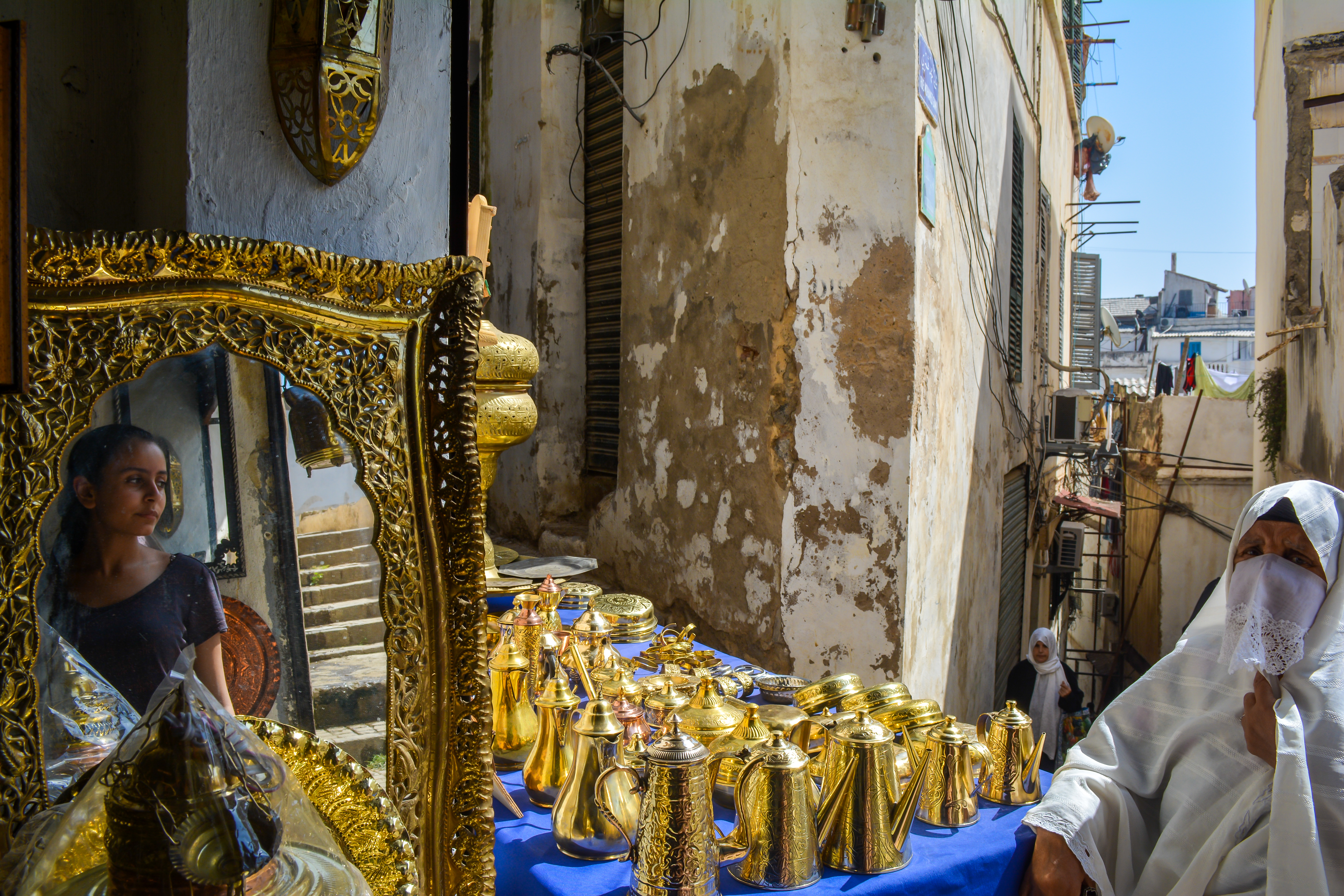
View of an alleyway and a traditional brassware stall in the Kasbah.

The handicraft sector in the Casbah is in decline. It has received no effective support policies, and combined with a struggling tourism industry, its current state is at odds with the once-flourishing history of the old city. The remaining master artisans are few, and traditional crafts face tax burdens and rising material costs. For example, brassware (dinanderie) is affected by a shrinking number of artisans, a scarcity of raw materials, and the rising price of copper sheets. Additionally, traditional handcrafted objects are increasingly being displaced by manufactured goods.

During the Regency of Algiers, artisans were under the authority of the caïd el blad (city commissioner), a high-ranking official close to the dey. Specialized districts—or rather, narrow streets (zenkat)—were dedicated to specific trades. Shops and artisan guilds that were still active at the end of the 19th century had largely disappeared by the years leading up to World War I.

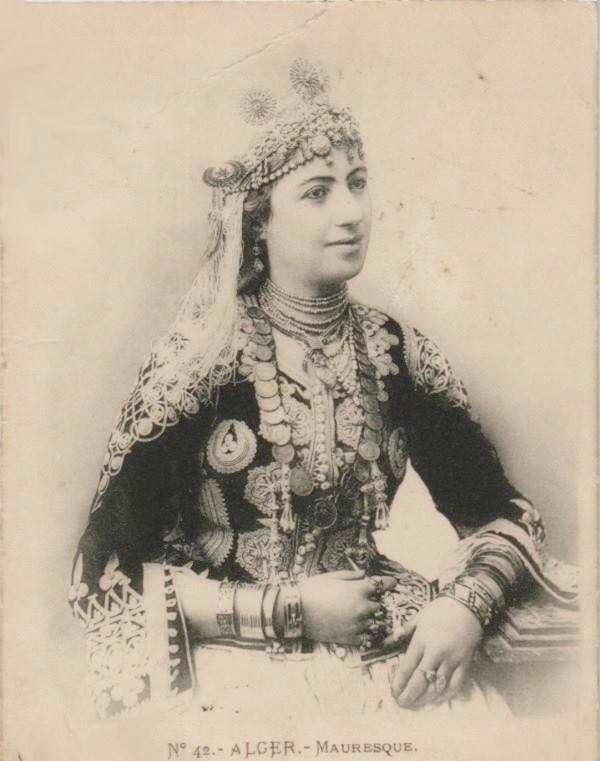
Woman from Algiers wearing a 19th-century Karakou.

One of Algiers' most renowned artisanal crafts is brassware, which dates back to the medieval period. Brassworkers (dinandiers) traditionally produce sniwa (richly decorated copper trays with geometric patterns), mibkhara (incense burners), l'brik and tassa (ewer and basin sets), berreds (teapots), and tebssi laâchaouets (conical-lid couscous steamers). The motifs used include stars, geometric shapes, and floral designs such as jasmine. Lucien Golvin viewed Algerian brassware as an Ottoman legacy—or at least as having strong similarities with artistic traditions from former Ottoman territories. Some decorative elements, such as tulips, carnations, cypresses, and scattered flowers, support this connection, as they frequently appear on engraved or incised copper objects.

The Casbah is also an important center for woodworking. The technique used is chiseling, and sometimes painting, to create richly decorated chests, mirrors, and tables. The artistic woodwork of old buildings continues to be restored by local artisans. A particular type of chest (sendouk) made of painted wood is still produced in the Casbah. These objects are called "bridal chests" because they are often used, especially in rural areas, to store wedding trousseaus. They feature two handles on each side and a lock for secure closure. The ornamentation consists of Arab-Andalusian motifs, often floral in nature, occasionally replaced by depictions of animals such as roosters or peacocks.

There is still a traditional garment-making craft in the Casbah, producing outfits such as the karakou, caftan, haïk, and fez. Shops near Jamaa Li Houd are the only ones that still sell "Algiers soap" (saboun D'zair).

The cultural value of these crafts is beginning to attract interest from both residents and the state, which, according to artisans, is still investing timidly in tax exemptions and specialized schools. Some initiatives to create artisanal businesses are revitalizing these trades—for instance, the crafting and restoration of painted wooden objects.

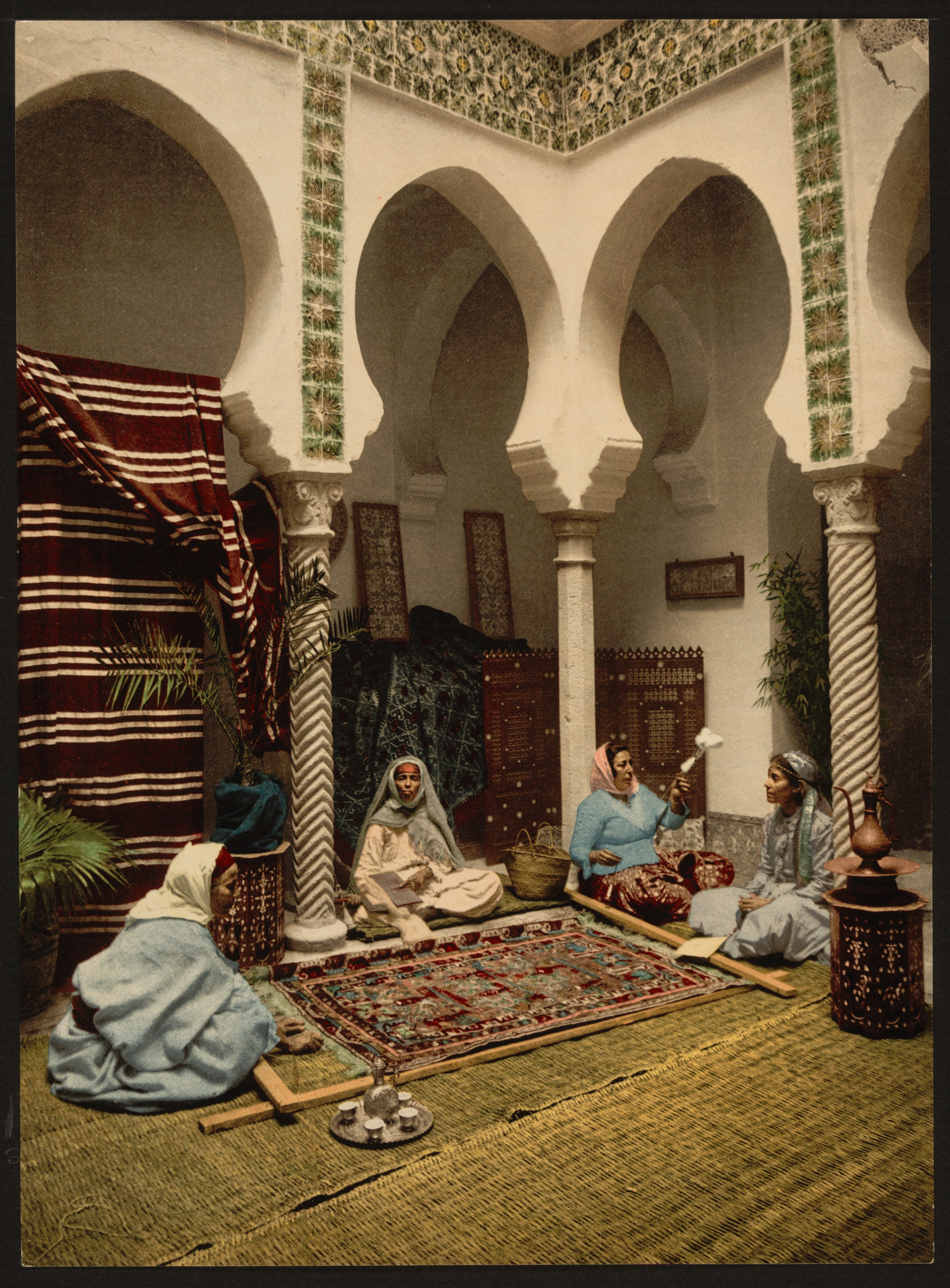
Women of Algiers weaving a carpet (c.1899).

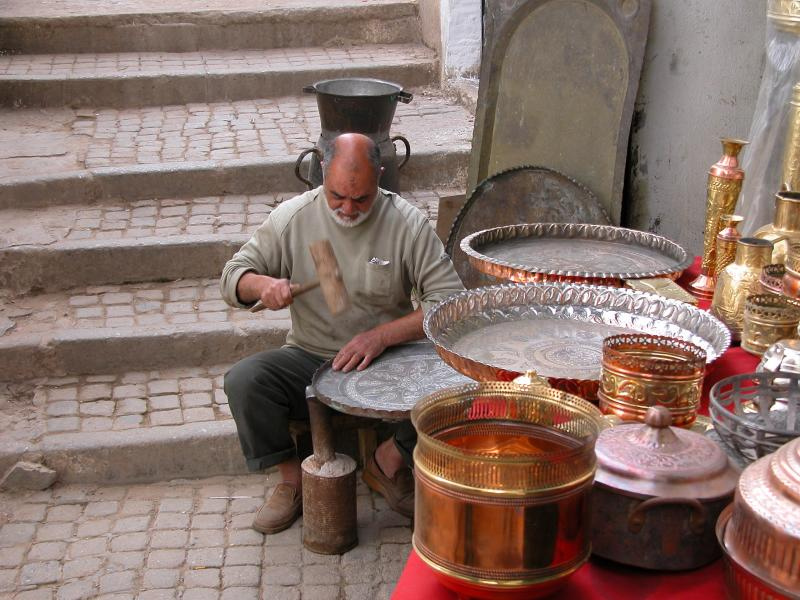
A coppersmith craftsman.

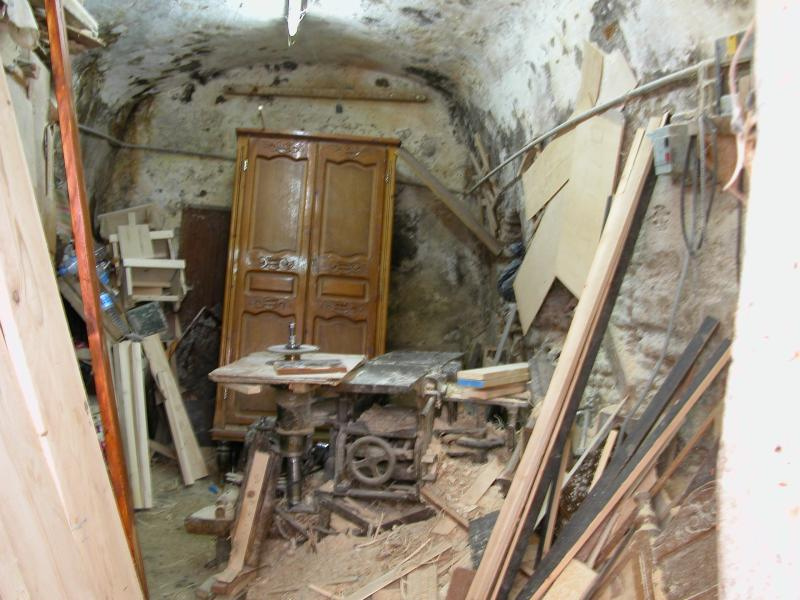
Carpentry workshop in the Casbah.

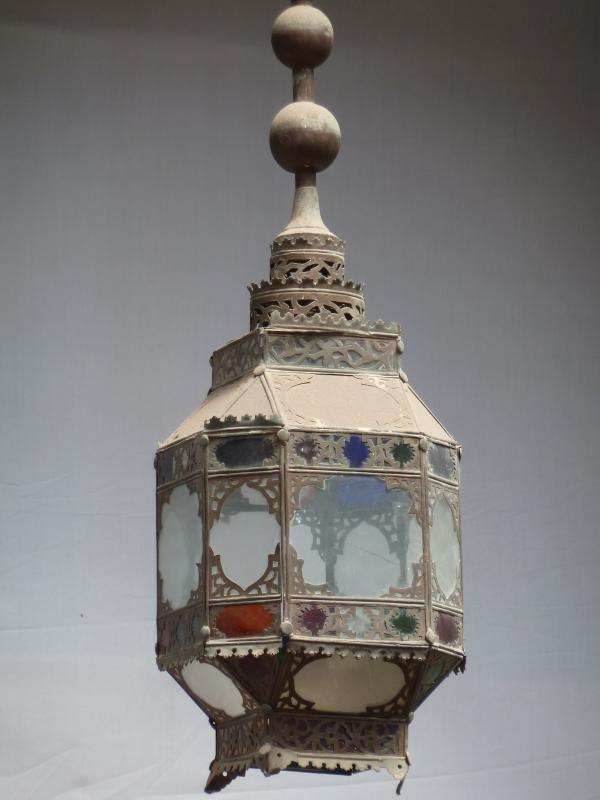
Handcrafted copper chandelier.

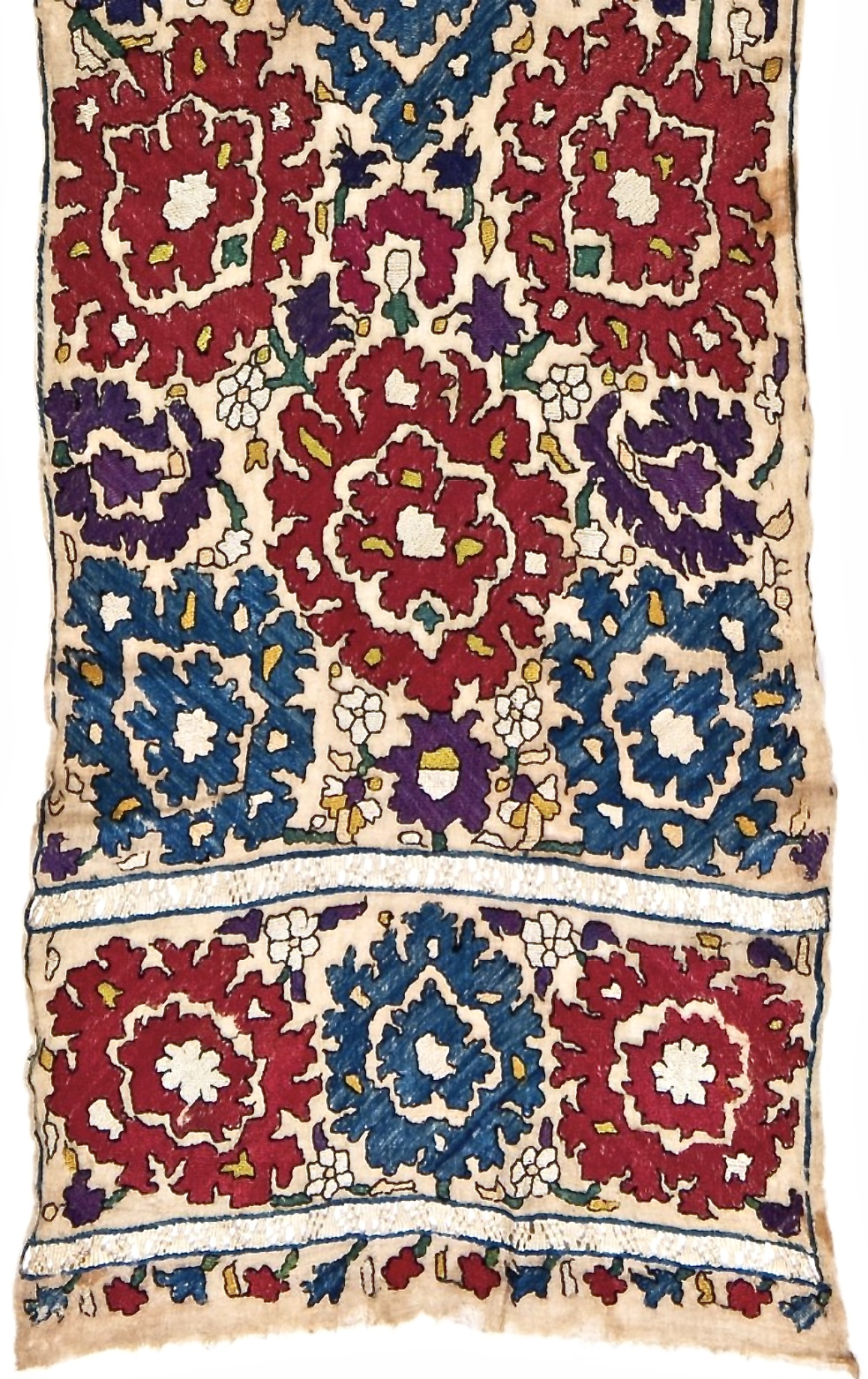
Silk embroidery known as point d'Alger from the 18th century

=== The Casbah in the arts ===
==== Cinema ====
Algiers has been at the heart of a rich filmography, one that few capitals in the world could rival by the 20th century. Around forty feature films and a hundred short films were shot there over the course of the century. Notable examples include Sarati le Terrible (1922), Tarzan, the Ape Man (1932), Pépé le Moko (1937), Casbah (1938), Heart of the Casbah (1952), The Stranger (1968), Z (1969), and The Battle of Algiers by Gillo Pontecorvo (1969). Pépé le Moko is still regarded as a film that glorifies the Casbah, where the setting steals the show from actor Jean Gabin. The Casbah also inspired local productions starting in 1969, including La Bombe (1969), Tahia ya Didou (1971), Omar Gatlato (1976), Autumn: October in Algiers (1988), Bab-el-Oued City (1994), Viva Laldjérie (2004), and Délice Paloma (2007).

The distinction between local and colonial productions lies not in filmmaking techniques or aesthetics but in the portrayal of Algerians. French cinema before independence was often characterized by the absence of native Algerians. In 2012, the film El Gusto explored Algeria's musical heritage and Casbah culture through the reunion of Muslim and Jewish musicians from Algeria.

Les Terrasses (Es-stouh), a Franco-Algerian drama directed by Merzak Allouache, was released in 2013.

==== Music ====
===== Musical troupes =====
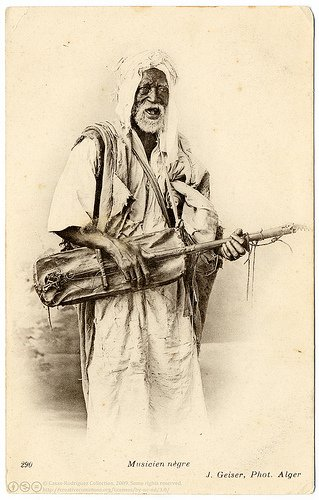
Gnaoui from Algiers with his guembri (around 1906).

The Casbah of Algiers once had a vibrant daily atmosphere with street performances by various musicians and entertainers. Among them were baba salem troupes, which frequently paraded and animated the streets, especially during celebrations like Mawlid. These groups, widely popular, were mostly composed of Africans from the Sahara, often referred to as gnaoua. The Gnaouas typically wear multicolored Saharan garments, a shell necklace, and play instruments such as the guembri, sound box, karkabou, and tambourine. Nowadays, baba salem troupes have become rare, though they still occasionally perform in Algiers.

Another type of folk troupe is the zornadjia, which performs at festive events. They take their name from the zorna, a kind of oboe, and produce rhythmic music accompanied by the tbilat (a type of drum) and the bendir. These zornadjia troupes are particularly common at weddings.

===== Arabo-Andalusian music =====
Chaâbi (meaning "popular") music belongs to the Arabo-Andalusian musical tradition. Over time, it became a symbol of urban popular culture. This genre remains vibrant today, an art form that has endured through generations and evokes the image of a timeless city. Chaâbi relies heavily on secular poetry (qçid), which it revives and adapts to contemporary tastes. The instruments used include the Algerian mandole (a specific instrument invented for chaâbi), the oud (an oriental lute), the banjo, the violin, the tar, and the derbouka.

This musical style emerged in the early 20th century among the working-class communities of the Casbah, many of whom were of Kabyle origin from the countryside. As a result, chaâbi is heavily influenced by Berber accents and exists in the Kabyle language in addition to its Algerian Arabic repertoire. The founding masters of this art include Cheikh Nador, Hadj El Anka, and Cheikh El Hasnaoui. Algerian chaâbi gained international recognition through the famous song Ya Rayah by Dahmane El Harrachi, which has been translated and performed worldwide. The recurring themes in chaâbi include cultural heritage, ancestral laments, homesickness, and traditional festive and religious songs. This music is often played at evening gatherings in courtyards, especially during Ramadan. Hadj El Anka established the first chaâbi music class at the Algiers Conservatory in 1957.

Chaâbi is also a musical genre shared by both Muslim and Jewish inhabitants of the Casbah. Among the most renowned Judeo-Arabic singers is Lili Boniche. His song Ana el Warka was used as the theme for the French TV show Des mots de minuit on France 2. Initiatives such as the El Gusto orchestra aim to reunite and popularize the Casbah's cultural heritage on international stages.

==== Painting ====
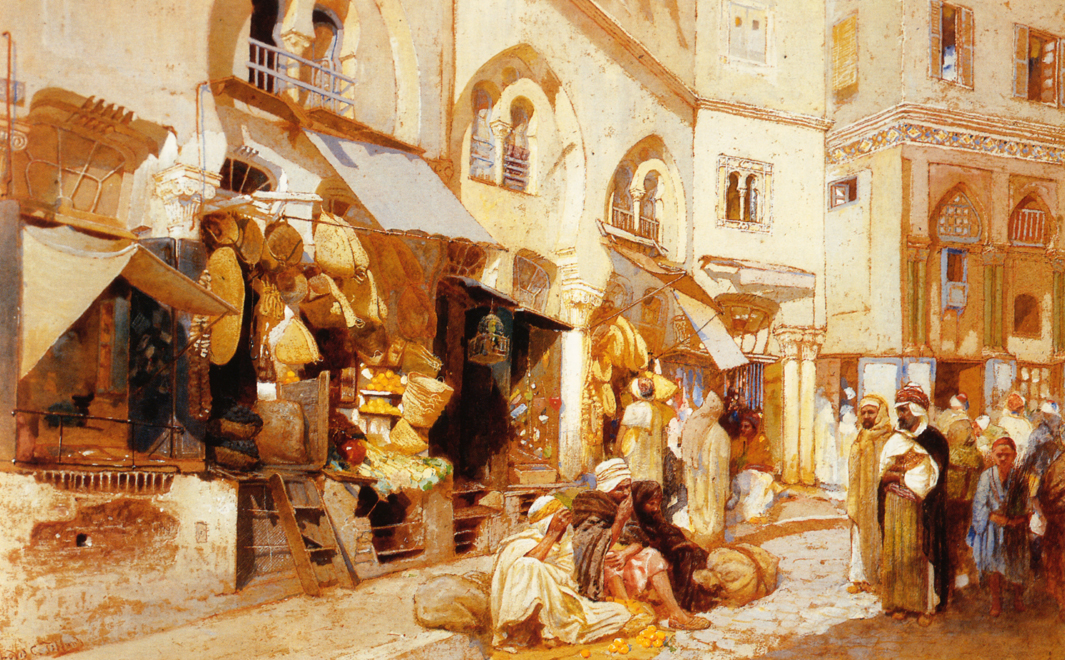
Algerian Shops by Louis Comfort Tiffany: representation of Algerian shops (c.1875).

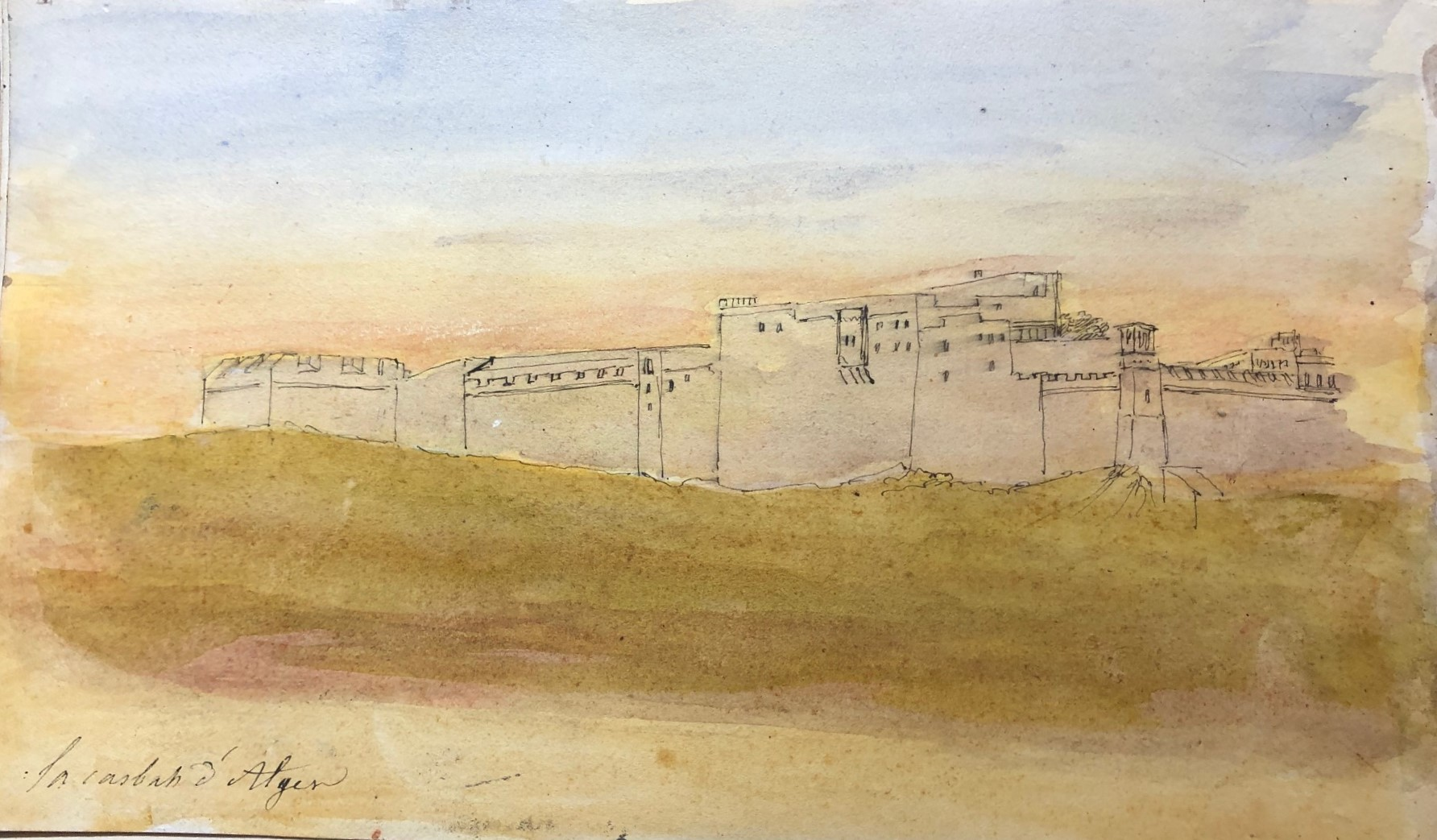
The "Casbah" of Algiers (1840) by Charles Frédéric Chassériau (1802-1896)

The Casbah of Algiers has inspired various Algerian and foreign painters, particularly within the Orientalist movement. As early as the 19th century, it served as a source of inspiration for artists such as Eugène Delacroix, who sought to immerse themselves in the atmosphere of the Arab city. One of the most famous painters of the Casbah was Mohammed Racim, a native of the district. His works depict the old Casbah, reviving Algerian folk traditions. Many of his paintings are now housed in the National Museum of Fine Arts of Algiers. The American painter Louis Comfort Tiffany also went through an Orientalist period and visited Algiers in 1875. Between 1957 and 1962, the painter René Sintès created a series of works capturing the Casbah. His paintings, particularly Petit Matin, La Marine, and Couvre-feu, reflect the turbulent atmosphere of Algiers during the Algerian War.

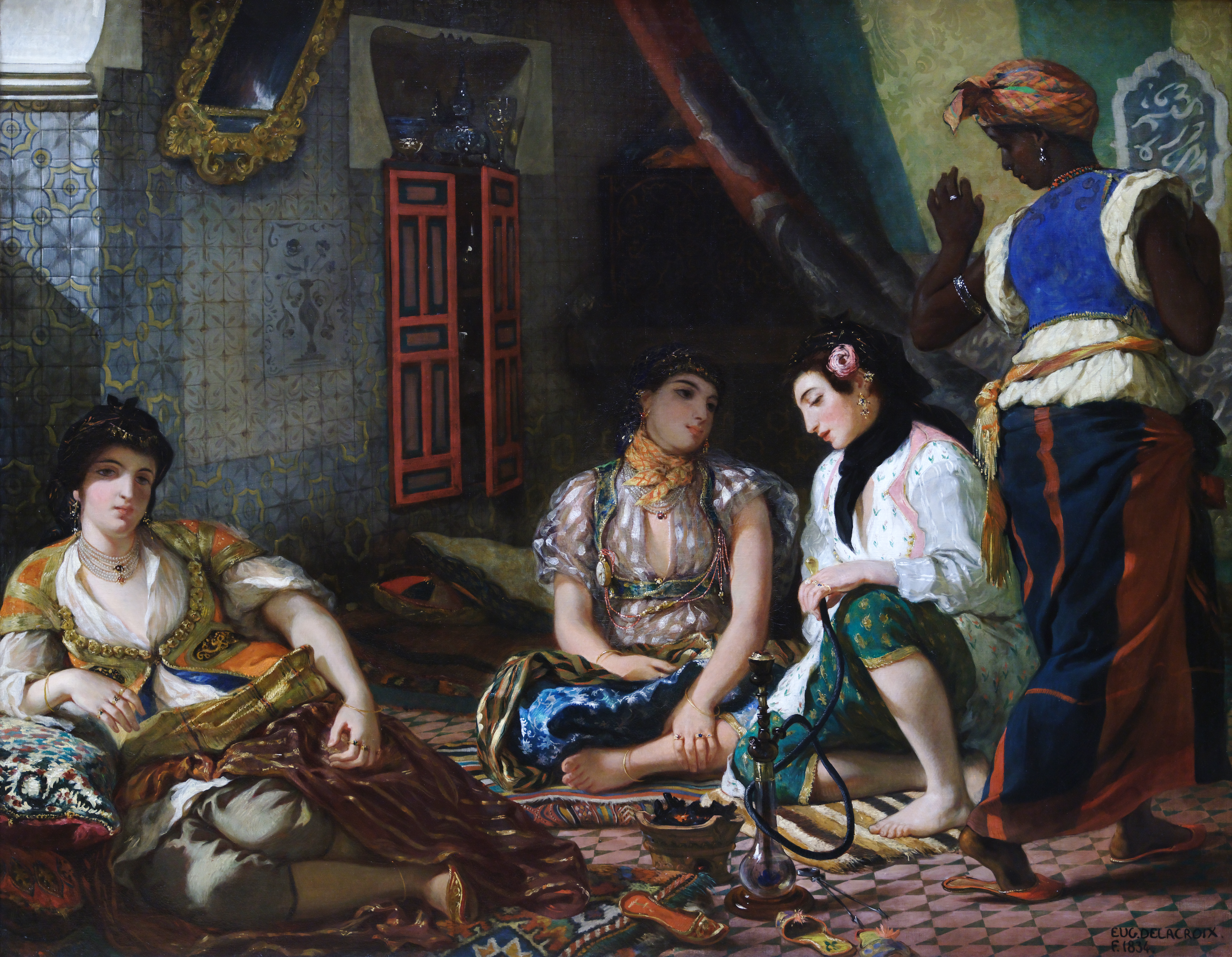
"Women of Algiers in their Apartment", oil on canvas by Eugène Delacroix (1798–1863), dated 1834, on display at the Musée du Louvre, Paris, France.

=== Cultural institutions ===
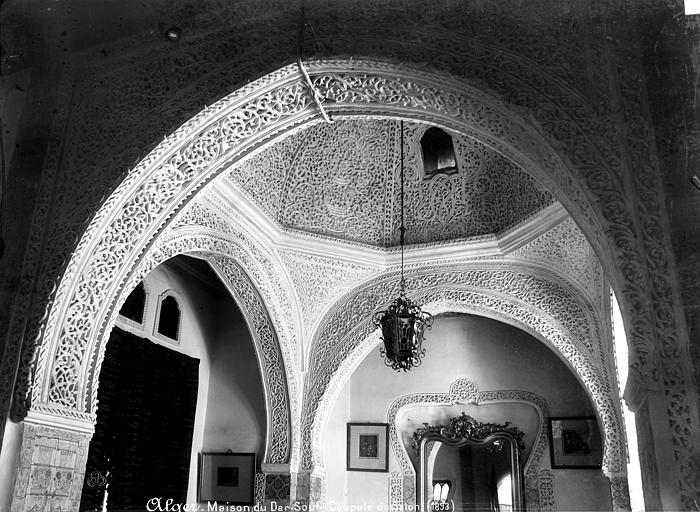
Interior of the dome of Dar Souf (c. 1893), which, together with Dar Moustapha Pacha, served as the former "National Library and Antiquities of Algiers" from 1863 to 1950.

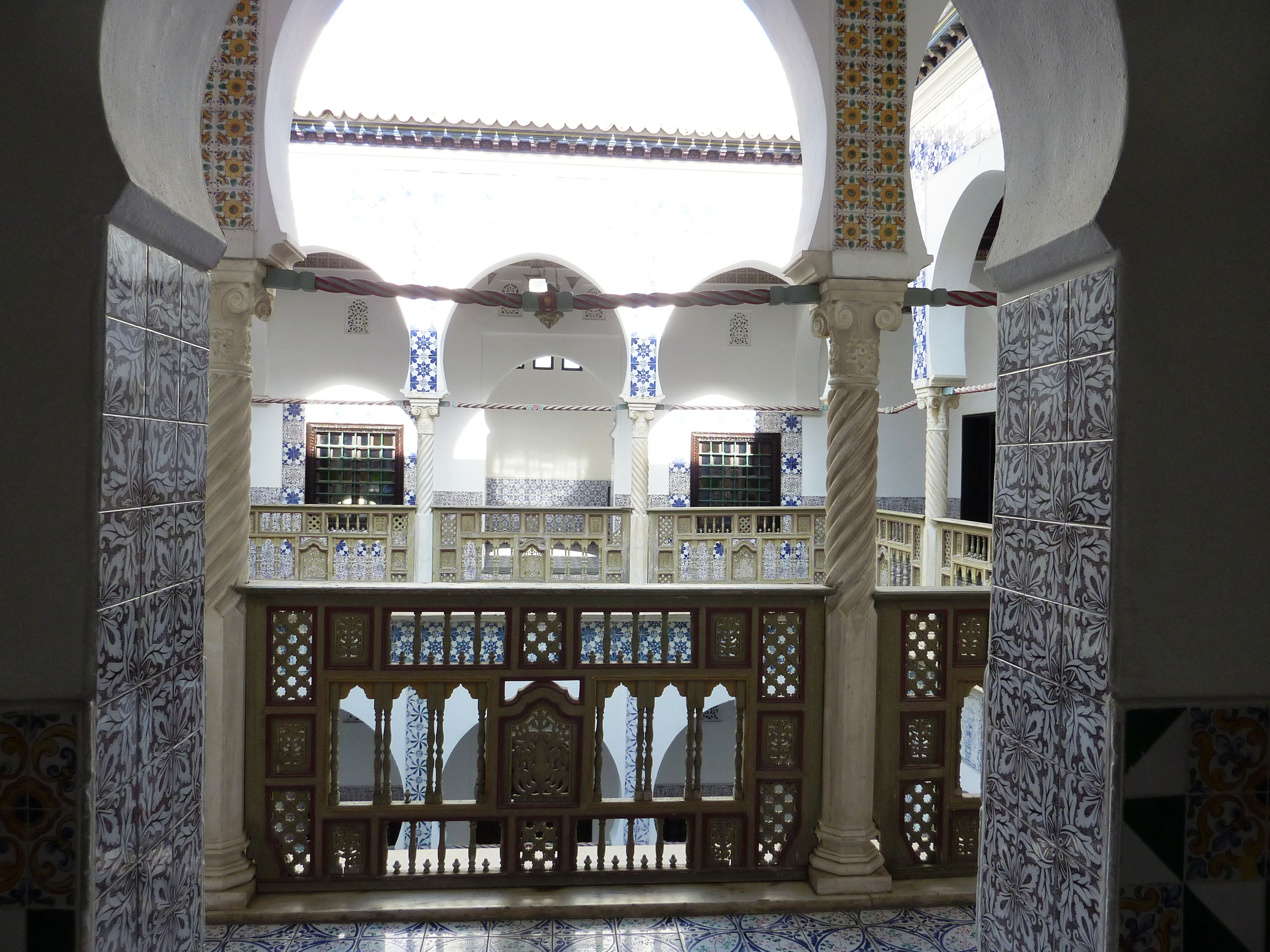
Palais des Raïs, headquarters of the "arts and culture center".

Since the 19th century, the Casbah has been home to cultural institutions such as the "National Library and Antiquities of Algiers," founded in 1863, which houses 30,000 volumes and 2,000 Arabic, Turkish, and Persian manuscripts. The Dar Khdaoudj el Amia Palace also serves as a cultural institution. It was the first town hall of Algiers between 1833 and 1839 before being repurposed by the General Government of Algeria as a "technical craft service" with a permanent exhibition of folk arts. In 1961, it became the "Museum of Arts and Popular Traditions" and was later renamed the "National Museum of Arts and Popular Traditions" in 1987. In 1969, Algiers hosted the first Pan-African Festival, during which the Casbah welcomed various artists from the African continent and its diaspora, as well as revolutionary movements such as the Black Panthers. The festival was reintroduced in 2009, a year when the Casbah's heritage was also highlighted.

After its restoration in 1994, the Palais des Raïs became the "Center for Arts and Culture," hosting temporary exhibitions, museum displays, and performances on its terrace, which features a row of cannons facing the sea.

The Casbah also hosts workshops and visits as part of the "International Cultural Festival for the Promotion of Earthen Architecture," organized by the Algerian Ministry of Culture. In 2007, when Algiers was designated the "Capital of Arab Culture," the occasion spurred discussions about heritage preservation and restoration. This event led to the inauguration of the "Algerian Museum of Miniature and Illumination," housed in the Dar Mustapha Pacha Palace. Dar Aziza, a palace in the lower Casbah that was once part of the old Djenina Palace complex, initially housed the "National Archaeology Agency" and now serves as the headquarters of the "Office for the Management and Exploitation of Protected Cultural Assets."

=== Written heritage ===
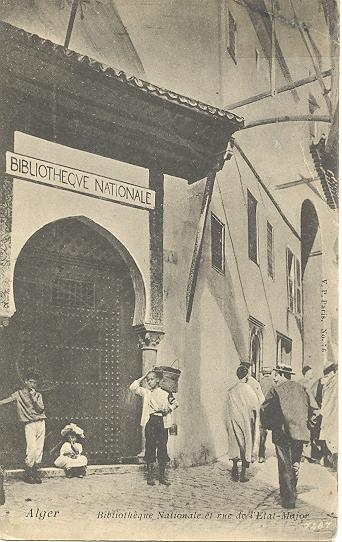
Former building of the National Library of Algeria in the Casbah.

Algiers possesses a significant written historical heritage. In the 19th century, the city had several collections housed in mosques, religious schools (zaouïas), and private collections. Much of this literary heritage suffered the same fate as many buildings, undergoing transformations and demolitions during the colonial period. This era also saw initiatives to preserve and catalog these works. Adrien Berbrugger established a collection housed in the Algiers Library, founded in 1836. The manuscripts originate from both local and foreign sources (Egypt, Andalusia, Morocco, Turkey) and cover cultural and scientific subjects. By 1872, 866 volumes had been cataloged in various libraries, including those of the Great Mosque (Jamaa el Kebir), Jamaa al-Jdid, and the mosques of Sidi Ramdane and Sidi Abderrahmane. At that time, Jamaa al-Jdid alone housed 555 volumes, acquired mainly through donations from the deys of Algiers. (Note: Since the deys followed the Hanafi school of Islam, this likely explains their significant donations to Jamaa al Jdid, a mosque primarily dedicated to the Hanafi rite, in contrast to the smaller volume of donations to Jamaa al Kebir, the Great Mosque, which follows the Maliki rite.) The 1872 inventory revealed that Jamaa el Kebir had lost two-thirds of its 1830 collection. Further inventories were conducted in 1907 and 1911. In 1909, Mohamed Bencheneb published the "Catalogue of the Great Mosque of Algiers." This collection includes religious texts, Quranic manuscripts, hadith compilations, biographies of the Prophet, Maliki and Hanafi legal treatises, theology, ethics, and grammar.

Another type of written heritage is the Tachrifat of the Regency of Algiers, also known as the "Register of Noble Affairs." This document is an administrative compilation of records from the Regency. In 1830, registers found in the dey's palace and among high-ranking administrators were transferred to the Arab archives of the colonial administration. These records contain information on tax collection, the management of beylik (state-owned) properties, and religious endowments. They also include scattered historical accounts, regulations, notes on administration, Christian slaves, and tributes paid to the Regency by foreign nations. The Tachrifat is one such collection of archives, translated at the beginning of the colonial period. These documents, which belong to the pre-colonial administration, now form the "Archives of the Former Regency of Algiers," housed in the Algerian national archives outside the Casbah. The National Library of Algeria, which preserves ancient collections, was originally located in historic palaces before moving in 1954 to a new site outside the Casbah. Today, its collections are kept in a modern facility near the Hamma Garden.

=== Water in culture ===
The role of water in the Casbah must be understood in its historical context. Water distribution in the city intersects with architecture, engineering and local customs. The concept of aquosity—a quality of life related to water—is a defining feature of many Mediterranean cities. Beyond shaping the city's unique urban identity, water is deeply embedded in intangible heritage, including legends and folklore.

In the 17th century, Algiers boasted an advanced hydraulic infrastructure that sustained a population of approximately 100,000 people, making it a major Mediterranean capital. One of the first elements of this heritage was the "sacred springs." The "Fountain of the Spirits" (Seb’aa Aïoun, meaning "Seven Springs") was a freshwater source that has since disappeared due to the construction of the waterfront. Because these freshwater springs emerged directly from the sea, they were associated with mystical beliefs. The djinn (spirit) of this fountain, Seb’aa Aïoun, was known among Sub-Saharan Africans as Baba Mûsa, also called Al-Bahari ("the freshwater spirit from the Niger"). The Aïn Sidi ‘Ali az-Zwawi spring was named after the saint Ali az-Zwawi, who died in 1576, and was mentioned by Diego de Haëdo. The water, believed to have numerous healing properties, originally flowed through his mausoleum, which stood outside Bab Azoun Gate but has since been destroyed. However, the spring still flows today inside a shop on Patrice Lumumba Street. Among the most famous fountains are those associated with marabouts (Muslim saints), giving them a mystical significance—such as the fountains of Sidi Abdelkader, Sidi Ali Ezzaoui, Mhamed Cherif, Mzaouqa, and Sidi Ramdane. Others, like Aïn Bir Chebana, are also well known. The fountain of Mhamed Cherif, in particular, is said to have the power to calm anxieties and worries if one drinks three sips of its water.

Water fountains were also considered acts of public generosity and were thus referred to in Algiers' toponymy by the Arabic term sabil or, more commonly in the plural form, sebala. This term literally means "charitable and selfless act". According to Kameche-Ouzidane, the word originates from the Quran, where it means "way, path, or road", and is the root of the expression fi sabil Allah, which conveys the idea of a selfless and generous action. Over time, the term came to designate public drinking fountains and water basins established through individual generosity. Such donations ensured that the donor's name would be remembered and contributed to their spiritual salvation in what was considered a "perishable world". Many inscriptions on fountains highlight the importance of water and their role as a public utility. This utility was even more significant because, originally, fountains and natural springs were the primary sources of water, and they could never be privately owned. Donors, as well as palace residents, were strictly forbidden from building such fountains within their private residences. Another form of water supply came from numerous wells—around 2,000 wells were recorded for 3,000 households at the beginning of the colonial era—as well as rainwater cisterns located in underground chambers, which collected water from rooftop terraces.

The fountain known as the "Cale aux Vins," now embedded in a wall of the Museum of Antiquities in Algiers, bears an inscription from 1235 that eloquently highlights the public utility of water and the benevolence of Hussein Pasha. This is evident in Gabriel Colin's translation:

It is through water that all life exists! The governor, Sultan of Algiers, Hussein Pasha, whose pious intentions always aim for good deeds and who, never straying from kindness, brings water everywhere, has made this water flow and built this fountain. By irrigating this place, he has quenched the thirst of those in need. Drink freely of this fresh water in honor of Hussein.

However, out of the 150 fountains that were once operational in the medina, only about ten remain functional today. Referred to by the Arabic words aïn (fountain) or bir (well), they reflect a certain appreciation for public spaces and city life. For example, the "Widows' Fountain" (Aïn al-Ahjajel) was reputed to have the power to bring husbands to widows. These fountains are an integral part of the medina and, although many have dried up, they persist as sites of memory, especially through their names and their role in the old city's toponymy.

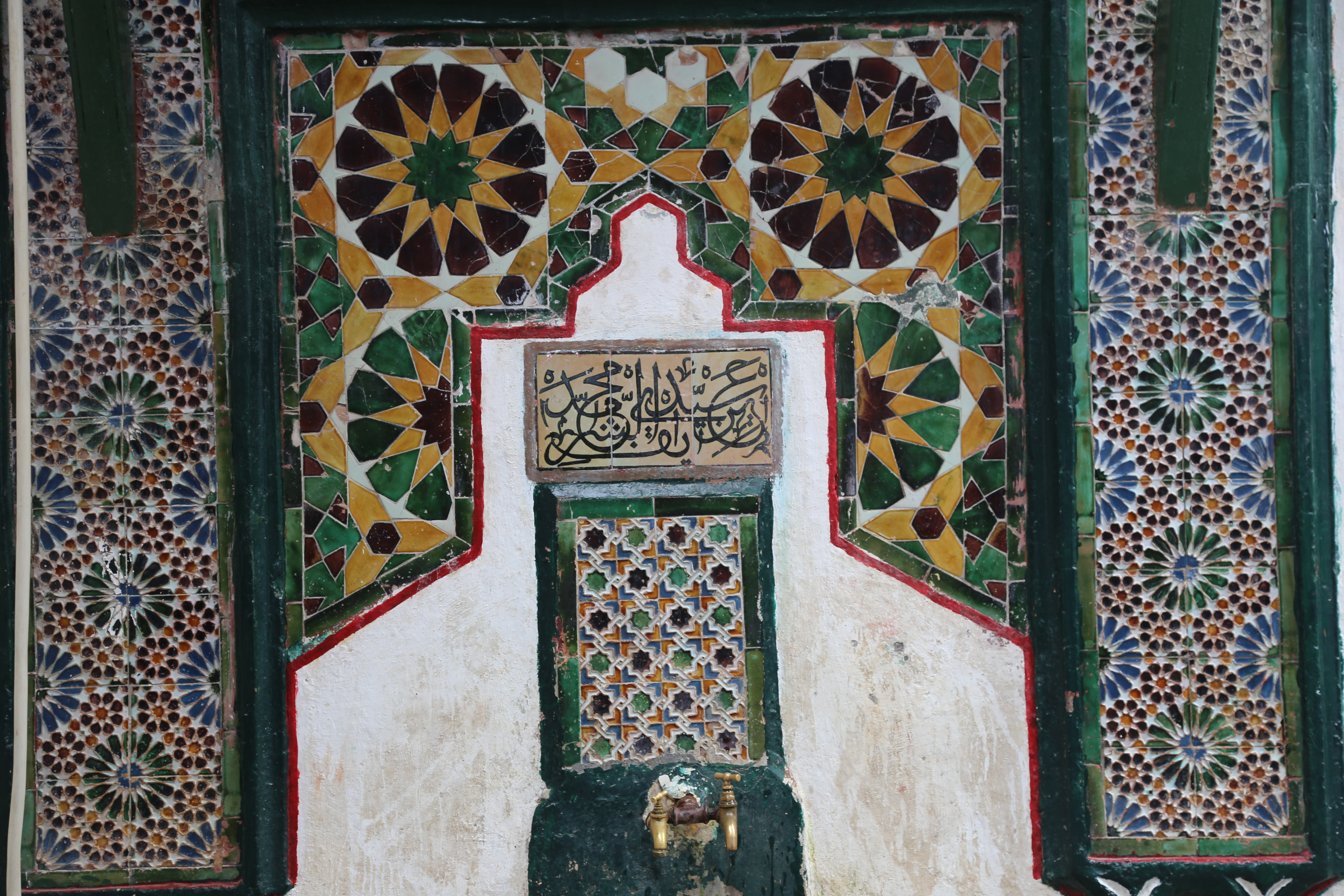
Aïn Sidi Mhamed Cherif.

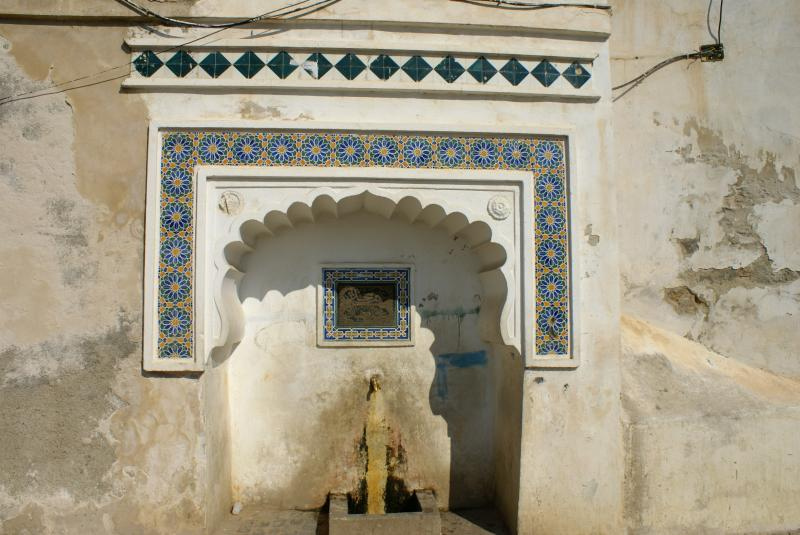
Aïn Sidi Ramdane.

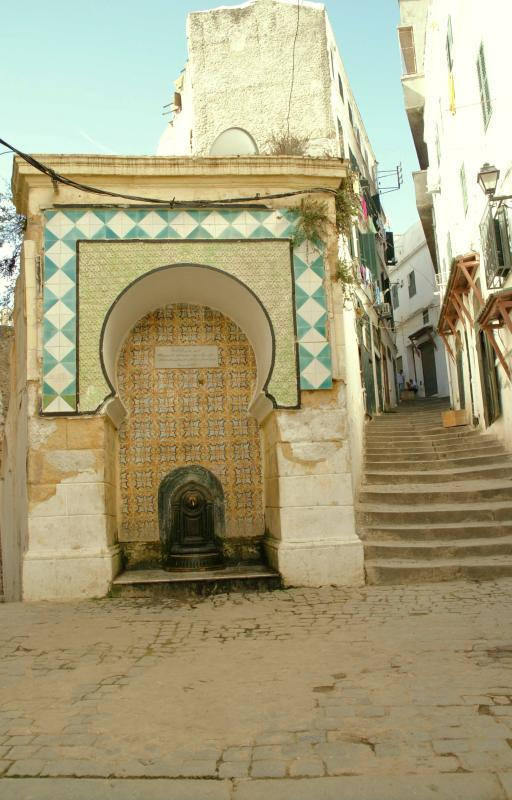
Aïn Bir Chebana.

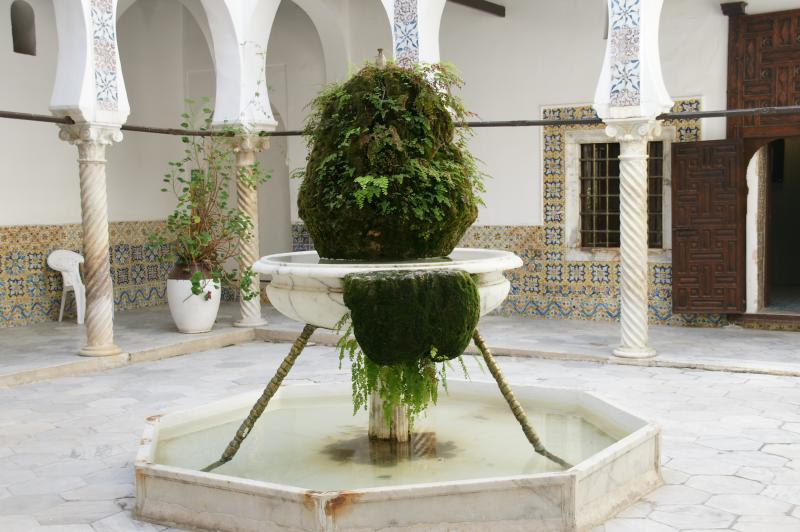
Fountain in the patio of Dar Mustapha Pacha.

=== Oral tradition ===
Oral culture plays a significant role in Algiers' traditions, particularly through the practice of boqala. (Note: Sometimes spelled bouqala or būqāla.) The boqala, in its classic form, is a short poem of four or five verses, either recited or sometimes improvised. Passed down through oral tradition or small written collections, these short poems constitute a centuries-old heritage. This poetry game oscillates between entertainment and divination. In the latter case, it is sometimes accompanied by a magical-religious ritual and is not exclusive to Algiers but is common in other coastal Algerian cities and their hinterlands, such as Blida, Béjaïa, Médéa, Miliana, and Cherchell. The content of a boqala is often a riddle, a mysterious text, or a wise saying, making it open to interpretation. These sessions are traditionally organized by women, although men can also participate. Gatherings typically take place around a well-prepared table, on house terraces, or in patios. They are usually held at night, on the eve of important days or certain days of the week—Wednesdays, Fridays, and Sundays. Such sessions are particularly common during the month of Ramadan. The word boqala comes from the Arabic term for an earthenware jug used to hold water, which is placed over a brazier and around which various rituals may take place. (Note: The water could be scented with incense or various essences, but also used in rituals to ward off the evil eye and djinns.)

The sessions begin with an invocation: "Fâl ya fâlfal djibli khbâr man koul blad" (O omen, bring me news from all lands). The language used in these boqala games is Algerian Arabic, incorporating borrowings from languages with which it has been in contact (Berber, Turkish, Spanish, and French), as it is primarily an urban tradition. While the origins of this practice remain unknown, boqala follows a literary structure similar to written poetry and is characterized by stylistic purity, rhythm, and sound patterns that contribute to its popularity. It bears similarities to ancient Andalusian poetry, hawzi music, and traditional songs from Tlemcen. This literary genre remains widespread today due to its thematic diversity, which allows it to engage various audiences and adapt to different circumstances. Moreover, it captivates listeners' imagination, fulfilling a certain desire for escapism.

== Current condition ==
The ANSS, the conservation agency of the Algerian government, reported that 373 buildings in the Casbah have collapsed. Of the 1816 buildings that remain, 40% are ruined or in a critical state, and 10% are boarded up.

Reuters reported in August 2008 that the Casbah was in a state of neglect and certain areas were at risk of collapse.

Algerian authorities list age, neglect and overpopulation as the principal contributors to the degeneration. Overpopulation makes the problem especially difficult to solve because of the effort it would take to relocate the residents. Estimates range from 40,000 to 70,000 people, although it is difficult to be certain due to the number of squatters in vacant buildings. One reason that the government wants to improve the condition of the Casbah is that it is a potential hideout for criminals and terrorists. In the late 1950s and during the civil insurrection and struggle against French colonial rule it was the hideout for the National Liberation Army (Algeria).

Preservationist Belkacem Babaci described the situation as difficult, but not insurmountable, saying: "I still believe it's possible to save it, but you need to empty it and you need to find qualified people who will respect the style, the materials. It's a huge challenge." Restoration projects have been plagued by delays and endemic corruption.

== Climate change ==
Since the Casbah of Algiers is a coastal landmark, it is vulnerable to sea level rise. In 2022, the IPCC Sixth Assessment Report included it in the list of African cultural sites which would be threatened by flooding and coastal erosion by the end of the century, but only if climate change followed RCP 8.5, which is the scenario of high and continually increasing greenhouse gas emissions associated with a warming of over 4 °C., and is no longer considered very likely. The other, more plausible scenarios result in lower warming levels and consequently lower sea level rise: yet sea level rise would continue for about 10,000 years in all of them. Even if the warming is limited to 1.5 °C, global sea level rise is still expected to exceed 2–3 m (7–10 ft) after 2000 years (and higher warming levels will see larger increases by then), consequently exceeding 2100 levels of sea level rise under RCP 8.5 (~0.75 m (2 ft) with a range of 0.5–1 m (2–3 ft)) well before the year 4000. Thus, it is a matter of time before the Casbah of Algiers is threatened by water levels, unless it can be protected by adaptation efforts such as sea walls.

== In popular culture ==
- The Casbah of Algiers plays a central role in the 1937 French film Pépé le Moko and the 1938 American film Algiers, in which the noted jewel thief Pepe le Moko, played by Jean Gabin in the French version and Charles Boyer in the American version, hides there after a heist in France, and he becomes a local leader, but as time passes, he begins to feel trapped in the district. Although in the American film, Boyer never said to costar Hedy Lamarr "Come with me to ze Casbah", this line was in the Hollywood movie trailer, and it would stick with him, thanks to generations of impressionists and Looney Tunes parodies.
- Boyer's role as Pepe Le Moko was already world-famous when animator Chuck Jones based the character of Pepé Le Pew, the romantic skunk introduced in 1945's Warner Bros. cartoon Odor-able Kitty, on Boyer, his voice – imitated by Mel Blanc – and the catch phrase "Come with me to ze Casbah" from his most well-known performance.
- The Casbah of Algiers plays a central role in the 1966 Italian-Algerian war film The Battle of Algiers, co-written and directed by Gillo Pontecorvo.
- "Rock the Casbah" is a song by the English punk rock band the Clash, released in 1982 as the second single from their fifth album, Combat Rock (1982). It reached number eight on the Billboard Hot 100 chart in the United States (their only top 10 single in that country) and, along with the track "Mustapha Dance", it also reached number eight on the dance chart.

== Notable people ==
- Abd al-Rahman al-Tha'alibi (1384-1479)
- Abdelhalim Bensmaia (1866-1933)
- Mohamed Charef (1908-2011)
- Brahim Boushaki (1912-1997)
- Abderrahmane Taleb (1930-1958)
- Djamila Bouhired (born 1935)
- Djamila Boupacha (born 1938)
- Mustapha Toumi (1937-2013)

== See also ==
- Kasbah
- Medina quarter

=== Geography ===
- Algiers
- Mitidja

=== History ===
- Zirid dynasty
- Regency of Algiers

=== Algerian War ===
- Battle of Algiers (1956–1957)
- Serkadji Prison
- Saadi Yacef
- Ali La Pointe
- Hassiba Ben Bouali
- Little Omar

=== Cinema ===
- Pépé le Moko by Julien Duvivier (1937)
- Algiers by John Cromwell (1938)
- Casbah by John Berry (1948)
- Heart of the Casbah by Pierre Cardinal (1952)
- The Battle of Algiers by Gillo Pontecorvo (1965)

== Bibliography ==
=== Works ===
==== History ====
- Montagnon, Pierre (1997). La conquête de l'Algérie : 1830-1871 [The conquest of Algeria: 1830-1871]. Blanche et rouge (in French). Paris: Pygmalion. ISBN 978-2-85704-204-4.
- Assari, Nadir (2007). Alger : des origines à la régence turque [Algiers: from its origins to the Turkish Regency] (in French). Algiers: Alpha. ISBN 978-9961-7-8015-2.
- Montagnon, Pierre (2012). Histoire de l'Algérie : Des origines à nos jours [History of Algeria: From its origins to the present day] (in French). Paris: Flammarion. ISBN 978-2-85704-204-4.
- El Bekri, Abou Obeïd (1965). Abou Obeïd El Bekri, Description de l'Afrique septentrionale : traduit de l'arabe par William Mac Guckin de Slane [Abu Obeid El Bekri, Description of Northern Africa: translated from the Arabic by William Mac Guckin de Slane] (in French). Paris: Librairie d'Amérique et d'Orient, Jean Maisonneuve.
- Lagardère, Vincent (1989). Les Almoravides jusqu'au règne de Yūsuf B. Tāšfīn (1039-1106) [The Almoravids until the reign of Yūsuf B. Tāšfīn (1039-1106)]. Histoire et perspectives méditerranéennes (in French). Paris: L'Harmattan.
- Koulakssis, Ahmed; Meynier, Gilbert (1987). L'émir Khaled : premier zaʼîm ? : identité algérienne et colonialisme français [Emir Khaled: first za'îm? Algerian identity and French colonialism]. Histoire et perspectives méditerranéennes (in French). Paris: L'Harmattan. ISBN 2-85802-859-1.
- Merouche, Lemnouar (2007). Recherches sur l'Algérie à l'époque ottomane [Research on Algeria in the Ottoman era] (in French). Paris: Bouchene. ISBN 978-2-912946-95-9.
- Meynier, Gilbert (2010). L'Algérie, cœur du Maghreb antique : de l'ouverture islamo-arabe au repli (698-1518) [Algeria, the heart of the ancient Maghreb: from Islamic-Arab openness to withdrawal (698-1518)] (in French). Paris: La Découverte. ISBN 978-2-7071-5231-2.
- Bouchène, Abderrahmane; Peyroulou, Jean-Pierre; Siari Tengour, Ouanassa; Thénault, Sylvie (2012). Histoire de l'Algérie à la période coloniale, 1830-1962 [History of Algeria during the colonial period, 1830-1962] (in French). Paris: La Découverte. ISBN 978-2-7071-8231-9.
- Ould Cadi Montebourg, Leïla (2006). Alger, une cité turque au temps de l'esclavage : À travers le Journal d'Alger du père Ximénez, 1718-1720 [Algiers, a Turkish city in the time of slavery: Through the Journal d'Alger of Father Ximénez, 1718-1720] (in French). Montpellier: Presses universitaires de la Méditerranée. ISBN 978-2-36781-083-6.
- Belvaude, Catherine (1991). L'Algérie [Algeria] (in French). Montpellier: Karthala. ISBN 978-2-86537-288-1.
- Delmas, Jean (2007). La bataille d'Alger [The Battle of Algiers] (in French). Larousse. ISBN 978-2-03-585477-3.
- Missoum, Sakina (2003). Alger à l'époque ottomane : la médina et la maison traditionnelle [Algiers in the Ottoman period: the medina and the traditional house] (in French). Edisud. ISBN 978-2-7449-0307-6.
- Leschi, Louis (1941). Comptes rendus des séances de l'année [Minutes of the year's sessions] (in French). Éditions Klincksieck.

==== Urbanism and cultural heritage ====
- Devoulx, Albert (2012). Tachrifat : recueil de notes historiques sur l'administration de l'ancienne régence d'Alger [Tachrifat: collection of historical notes on the administration of the former regency of Algiers] (in French). Hachette. ISBN 978-2-01-262742-0.
- Oulebsir, Nabila (2004). Les usages du patrimoine : monuments, musées et politique coloniale en Algérie, 1830-1930 [The uses of heritage: monuments, museums and colonial policy in Algeria, 1830-1930] (in French). Paris: Les éditions de la MSH. ISBN 2-7351-1006-0.
- Cohen, Jean-Louis; Oulebsir, Nabila; Kanoun, Youcef; Delaunay, Dominique (2003). Alger : paysage urbain et architectures, 1800-2000 [Algiers: urban landscape and architecture, 1800-2000] (in French). Besançon: Les éditions de l'imprimeur. ISBN 2-910735-83-4.
- Almi, Saïd (2002). Urbanisme et colonisation : présence française en Algérie [Town planning and colonization: French presence in Algeria] (in French). Sprimont (Belgium): Éditions Mardaga. ISBN 2-87009-812-X.
- Quenza, Bougherira-Hadji (2007). "Typologies modernes versus typologies traditionnelles dans les médinas algériennes" [Modern typologies versus traditional typologies in Algerian medinas]. Architecture Traditionnelle Méditerranéenne [Traditional Mediterranean Architecture] (PDF) (in French). Barcelona: Collegi d'Aparelladors i Arquitectes Tècnics de Barcelona pour Rehabimed. p. 110. ISBN 978-84-87104-74-9.
- Atkinson, Adrian (2008). Stratégies pour un développement durable local : renouvellement urbain et processus de transformations informelles [Strategies for local sustainable development: urban renewal and informal transformation processes] (in French). Berlin: Univerlagtuberlin. ISBN 978-3-7983-2086-4.
- Dris, Nassima (2005). "Habiter le patrimoine : monde en marge et identité urbaine : La Casbah d'Alger ou le refuge des exclus" [Inhabiting heritage: marginalized communities and urban identity: the Casbah of Algiers, a refuge for outcasts]. Habiter le patrimoine : Enjeux, approches, vécu [Inhabiting heritage: Issues, approaches, experiences] (in French). Rennes: Presses universitaires de Rennes. ISBN 9782753526754.
- Bencheneb, Mohamed (1909). Catalogue des Manuscrits arabes de la Grande Mosquée d'Alger [Catalogue des Manuscrits arabes de la Grande Mosquée d'Alger] (in French). Algiers: Jourdan.

==== Art ====
- Vidal-Bué, Marion (2003). L'Algérie des peintres : 1830-1960 [The Algeria of the painters: 1830-1960] (in French). Algiers/Paris: Paris-Méditerranée. ISBN 2-84272-143-8.
- Rahmani, Farida; Bouchenaki, Mounir (2003). La Casbah d'Alger : un art de vivre des Algériennes [The Casbah of Algiers: an Algerian way of life] (in French). Algiers/Paris: Paris-Méditerranée. ISBN 2-84272-174-8.
- Samrakandi, Mohammed; Tibouchi, Hamid (2003). Conte, conteurs et néo-conteurs : usages et pratiques du conte et de l'oralité entre les deux rives de la Méditerranée [Storytelling, storytellers and neo-storytellers: uses and practices of storytelling and orality between the two shores of the Mediterranean] (in French). Paris: Presses Universitaires du Mirail. ISBN 2-85816-692-7.
- Eudel, Paul (2015). L'orfèvrerie algérienne et tunisienne : Essai d'Art [Algerian and Tunisian gold and silversmithing: Art Essay] (in French). Paris: Primento. ISBN 978-2-335-05040-0.
- Tchebwa, Manda (2012). L'Afrique en musiques [Africa in music] (in French). Montpellier: L'Harmattan. ISBN 978-2-296-96409-9.
- National publishing and advertising agency (1997). L'artisanat algérien [Algerian handicrafts] (in French). Algiers: Anep.
- MʼHamsadji, Kaddour (1989). Jeu de la boûqâla : contribution à une meilleure connaissance de ce divertissement éducatif et populaire [Boûqâla game: contribution to a better understanding of this educational and popular pastime] (in French). Algiers: Office des publications universitaires. ISBN 978-9961-0-0578-1.

==== Generalist ====
- Ravéreau, André (2007). Casbah d'Alger, et le site créa la ville [Kasbah of Algiers, and the site created the city]. La Bibliothèque arabe (in French). Paris: Actes Sud. ISBN 978-2-7427-6513-3.
- Lebane, Amine (2009). Guide de la Casbah d'El-Djazaïr [Guide to the Kasbah of El-Djazaïr] (in French). Algiers: Éditions Guidmania.
- Guemriche, Salah (2012). Alger la Blanche : biographies d'une ville [Alger la Blanche: biographies of a city] (in French). Paris: EDI8. ISBN 978-2-262-04039-0.
- Cheurfi, Achour (2006). Dictionnaire Encyclopédique de l'Algérie [Encyclopedic Dictionary of Algeria] (in French). Algiers: ANEP. ISBN 978-9947-2-1319-3.
- Esquer, Gabriel (1957). Alger et sa région [Algiers and the surrounding region] (in French). Paris: Arthaud.
- Vircondelet, Alain (2014). Alger, ombres et lumières : Une biographie [Algiers, Lights and Shadows: A Biography] (in French). Paris: Flammarion. ISBN 978-2-08-133834-0.
- Dris, Nassima (2002). La ville mouvementée. Espace public, centralité, mémoire urbaine à Alger [The eventful city. Public space, centrality, urban memory in Algiers] (in French). Algiers: Anep. ISBN 978-2-7475-1812-3.
- MʼHamsadji, Kaddour (2007). Casbah d'Alger, autrefois [The Casbah of Algiers, in the past] (in French). Vol. 1: Histoire. De l'île aux Mouettes à la Casbah. Office des publications universitaires. ISBN 978-9961-0-1057-0.
- Gedovius, Alain (2018). La Casbah d'Alger 1960, L'esprit d'une ville [The Casbah of Algiers 1960, The Spirit of a City] (in French). Paris: Editions Imanta. ISBN 9782956288206.

=== Newspapers ===
==== History ====
- Camps, Gabriel; Leglay, Marcel; Golvin, Lucien; Mantran, Robert; Boyer, Pierre (2012). "Alger" [Algiers]. Encyclopédie berbère (in French). 4: 447–472. doi:10.4000/encyclopedieberbere.2434. ISSN 2262-7197. Archived from the original on February 19, 2016.
- Chergui, Samia (2009). "Les morisques et l'effort de construction d'Alger aux xviie et xviiie siècles" [The Moriscos and the construction of Algiers in the 17th and 18th centuries]. Cahiers de la Méditerranée (in French) (79): 447–472. doi:10.4000/cdlm.4932. Archived from the original on June 17, 2021.
- Grangaud, Isabelle (2008). "À propos des archives de l'Algérie ottomane : notes sur le rapport entre conditions de production et nature et usages des sources historiques" [About the archives of Ottoman Algeria: notes on the relationship between production conditions and the nature and uses of historical sources]. Ateliers du LESC (in French). 32. doi:10.4000/ateliers.3222. ISSN 1245-1436. Archived from the original on January 26, 2021.
- Lalmi, Nedjma Abdelfettah (2004). "Du mythe de l'isolat kabyle" [The myth of the isolated Kabyle]. Cahiers d'études africaines (in French). 44 (175): 507–531. doi:10.4000/etudesafricaines.4710. Archived from the original on June 9, 2011.
- Hoexter, Miriam (1983). "Taxation des corporations professionnelles d'Alger à l'époque turque" [Taxation of professional corporations in Algiers during the Turkish period]. Revue de l'Occident musulman et de la Méditerranée (in French). 36 (36): 19–39. ISSN 2105-2271. Archived from the original on March 21, 2024.
- Mari, Jean-Paul (1992). "Algérie : la Casbah des désespérés" [Algeria: the Casbah of the desperate] (PDF). Extrait du Grands Reporters (in French): 1–4. ISSN 2105-2271. Archived from the original (PDF) on March 3, 2016.

==== Urbanism and cultural heritage ====
- Lakjaa, Abdelkader (1998). "Lesbet, Djafar.- La Casbah d'Alger : gestion urbaine et vide social" [Lesbet, Djafar.- The Casbah of Algiers: urban management and social vacuum]. Insaniyat (in French). 5 (5): 134–138. doi:10.4000/insaniyat.11890. ISSN 2335-1578. Archived from the original on November 13, 2014.
- Bekkouche, Ammara (2011). "Alger dans tous ses éclats" [Algiers in all its glory]. Jeune Afrique (in French). 5 (2622): 134. ISSN 1950-1285.
- Abdessemed-Foufa, Amina (2011). "Le manuel de réhabilitation comme outil de conservation dans le cadre du plan permanent de sauvegarde de la Casbah d'Alger" [The rehabilitation manual as a conservation tool within the framework of the permanent plan for the safeguarding of the Casbah of Algiers] (PDF). RehabiMed (in French). Archived from the original (PDF) on March 3, 2016.
- Kameche-Ouzidane, Dalila (2014). "Alger et ses espaces publics. Quelle place pour l'eau dans l'ambiance de la Casbah et la ville ?" [Algiers and its public spaces. What role does water play in the atmosphere of the Casbah and the city?]. L'ambiance comme enjeu de l'espace public méditerranéen contemporain (Conférence internationale de Tunis, 24-25-26 février 2014) [Atmosphere as a challenge for contemporary Mediterranean public spaces (International Conference in Tunis, February 24-25-26, 2014)] (in French). Archived from the original on March 4, 2016.
- Kameche-Ouzidane, Dalila (2013). Les aqueducs à souterazi de la Régence d'Alger [The underground aqueducts of the Regency of Algiers] (in French).
- Kassab, Tsouria (2010). "Réécriture des espaces, entre discours idéologiques et pratiques : La Casbah d'Alger" [Re-writing of spaces, between ideological discourse and practices: The Casbah of Algiers]. Colloque international, dans le cadre des États généraux du Vieux-Québec, organisé par l'Institut du Nouveau Monde (Montréal, Canada) à l'initiative du Comité des citoyens du Vieux-Québec [International symposium, as part of the États généraux du Vieux-Québec, organized by the Institut du Nouveau Monde (Montreal, Canada) on the initiative of the Comité des citoyens du Vieux-Québec] (PDF) (in French). Archived from the original (PDF) on March 3, 2016.
- Safar-Zitoun, Madani (2001). "Alger ou la recomposition d'une métropole" [Algiers or the reconstruction of a metropolis]. La pensée de midi (in French). 1 (4): 30–35. doi:10.3917/lpm.004.0030. ISSN 1621-5338. Archived from the original on March 3, 2016.
- Safar-Zitoun, Madani (2009). "Alger d'aujourd'hui : une ville à la recherche de ses marques sociales" [Algiers today: a city searching for its social bearings]. Insaniyat (in French) (44–45): 44–45. doi:10.4000/insaniyat.385. ISSN 2335-1578. Archived from the original on July 19, 2016.
- Sekfali, Zineddine (2007). "Histoire et architecture à Alger — Que peut-on encore sauver ?" [History and architecture in Algiers — What can still be saved?]. Revue Tourisme Magazine (in French).
- Baghli, Sid Ahmed (2006). "La préservation du patrimoine : l'exemple du palais du dey d'El Djazaïr" [Preserving heritage: the example of the palace of the Dey of El Djazaïr]. Comptes rendus des séances de l'Académie des Inscriptions et Belles-Lettres (in French). 150 (1): 552–562. doi:10.3406/crai.2006.86970. ISSN 1969-6663. Archived from the original on January 8, 2022.
- Jaouhari, Mustapha (2009). "Abdelhamid Arab : Manuscrits et bibliothèques musulmanes en Algérie" [Abdelhamid Arab: Manuscripts and Muslim libraries in Algeria]. IFAO 2011 Bulletin critique des Annales islamologiques (in French). Archived from the original on June 17, 2022.
- Souq, François; Stiti, Kemal (2011). "Fouilles récentes à Alger" [Recent excavations in Algiers]. Les nouvelles de l'archéologie (in French) (124): 44–48. doi:10.4000/nda.1432. ISSN 0242-7702. Archived from the original on September 18, 2020.

==== Art ====
- Balta, Paul (2008). "Alger, capitale de la culture arabe 2007" [Algiers, capital of Arab culture 2007]. Confluences Méditerranée (in French). 2 (65): 195–198. doi:10.3917/come.065.0195. ISSN 1148-2664. Archived from the original on September 24, 2015.
- Golvin, Lucien (1985). "Le legs des Ottomans dans le domaine artistique en Afrique du Nord" [The Ottoman legacy in the arts in North Africa]. Revue de l'Occident musulman et de la Méditerranée (in French). 39: 201–226. ISSN 2105-2271. Archived from the original on July 23, 2023.
- Gast, M (1994). "Coffre" [Chest]. Encyclopédie berbère (in French). 13 : Chèvre – Columnatien (13): 2035–2042. doi:10.4000/encyclopedieberbere.2304. ISSN 2262-7197. Archived from the original on March 23, 2017.
- Dridi, Daïkha (2001). "La petite musique du voyage au bout de la nuit" [The music of a journey through the night]. La pensée de midi (in French). 1 (1): 65–71. doi:10.3917/lpm.004.0065. ISSN 1621-5338.
- Bensignor, François (2012). "Algérie andalouse : Lili Boniche et El Gusto" [Algerian Andalusian: Lili Boniche and El Gusto]. Hommes et Migrations (in French). 1 (1): 65–71. ISSN 2262-3353. Archived from the original on October 15, 2023.

==== Generalist ====
- Bekkouche, Ammara (1998). "Ravereau, André. - La Casbah d'Alger, et le site créa la ville. - Préface de Mostéfa Lacheraf" [Ravereau, André. - The Casbah of Algiers, and the site that created the city. - Preface by Mostéfa Lacheraf]. Insaniyat (in French). 5: 134. ISSN 2335-1578. Archived from the original on February 8, 2018.
- Makhloufi, Lilia (2012). "Les ambiances dans les vieilles villes algériennes : entre cultures, identités et héritages sensoriels" [The atmospheres in the old Algerian cities: between cultures, identities and sensory heritages]. Ambiances in Action / Ambiances en Acte(s) - International Congress on Ambiances, Montreal 2012 (in French): 487–492. ISSN 1969-6663. Archived from the original on April 10, 2023.
- Giovanetti, Francesco (1992). "De la Casbah d'Alger" [From the Casbah of Algiers] (PDF). Environmental Design: Journal of the Islamic Environmental Design Research Centre 1-2 (in French): 66–79. ISSN 0393-5183. Archived from the original (PDF) on March 3, 2016.
