= Ali La Pointe =

Algerian guerrilla leader (1930–1957)

Ali Ammar
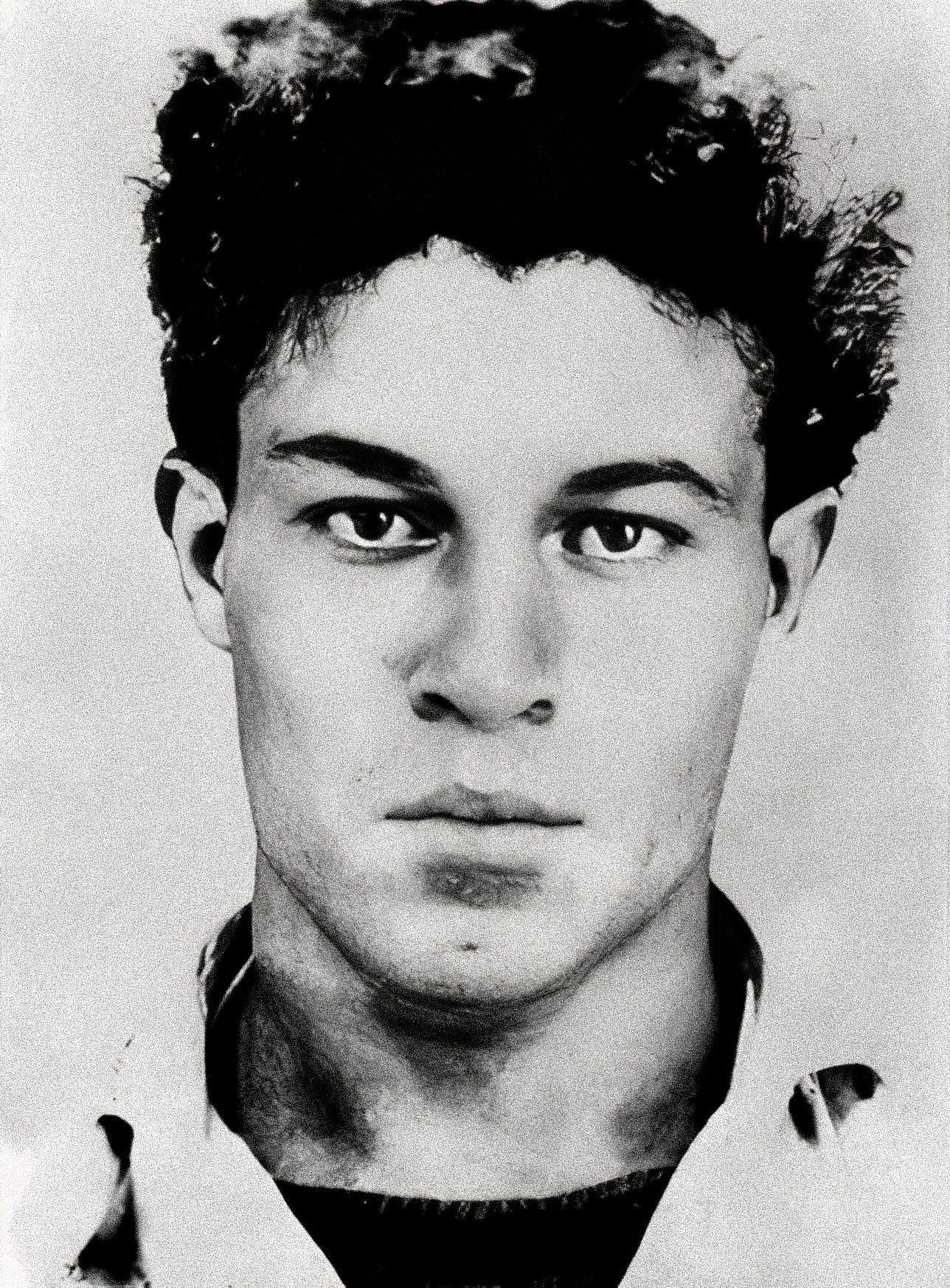
- Born: 14 May 1930; Miliana, French Algeria (present-day Algeria)
- Died: 8 October 1957 (aged 27); Algiers, Algeria
- Cause of death: Killed in action
- Occupation: Militant
- Military career
- Allegiance: FLN
- Service years: 1955–1957
- Conflicts: Algerian War; Battle of Algiers

Ali Ammar (Arabic: علي عمار; 14 May 1930 – 8 October 1957), better known by his nom-de-guerre Ali la Pointe, was an Algerian militant, prominent revolutionary, and guerilla figure of the Algerian War. He is best known for being one of the FLN commanders during the Battle of Algiers.

Prior to his revolutionary career, Ali was convicted of minor offenses, including theft, and was serving a two-year prison sentence in Barberousse prison when the Algerian War broke out. Recruited in the prison by FLN militants, he became one of their key lieutenants in Algiers. On 28 December 1956, he was suspected of killing the Mayor of Boufarik, Amédée Froger.

In 1957, French paratroopers led by Colonel Yves Godard systematically isolated and eliminated the FLN leadership in Algiers. Godard's extortion methods and tactics included torture. In June, La Pointe led teams setting explosives in street lights near bus stops and bombing a dance club that killed 17 people.

Saadi Yacef ordered the leadership to hide in separate addresses within the Casbah. After Yacef's capture, la Pointe and three companions, Hassiba Ben Bouali, Mahmoud "Hamid" Bouhamidi, and 'Petit Omar', hid until 8 October. Tracked down on a tip-off from an informer, Ali La Pointe was given the chance to surrender but refused. He, his companions, and the house in which he was hiding were bombed by French paratroopers, killing him along with 20 other Algerians.

== Early life ==
Ali Ammar was born to a poor family on 14 May 1930 in Miliana, Algeria. The family's financial situation did not allow him to attend school. He worked in the fields of the settlers because of poverty. Ali moved to Algiers with his father in search of work, settling in the Casbah. His nickname "la Pointe" comes from the Point district in Miliana. While being imprisoned for the first time at the age of 13, he learned masonry. In 1945, he became known in Algeria for playing tchi-tchi, a type of gambling game scam.

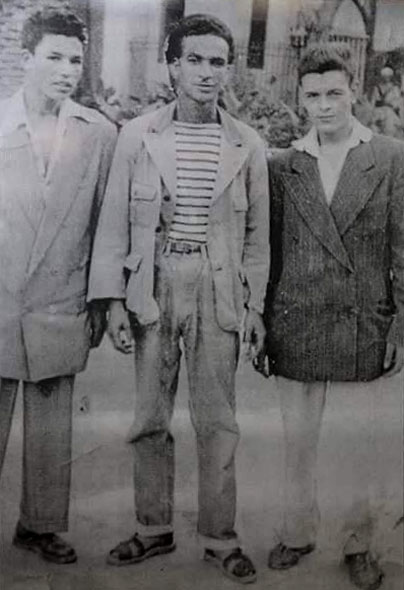
Ali La Pointe in 1940 (First from the left)

He was convicted of theft of military effects in 1943 and of intentional assault and battery against an officer in 1952. In 1954, when the Algerian War broke out, he escaped from the Barberousse prison, where he was serving a two-year sentence for attempted murder, and joined the National Liberation Front (FLN). The FLN militants explained to him that Algeria was a victim of colonialism and recruited him to their cause. He was later caught and transferred to a prison in Damiette, now known as Aïn Deheb, where he escaped again. He returned to Algiers and made contact a few months later with Yacef Saadi.

== Activity within the FLN ==
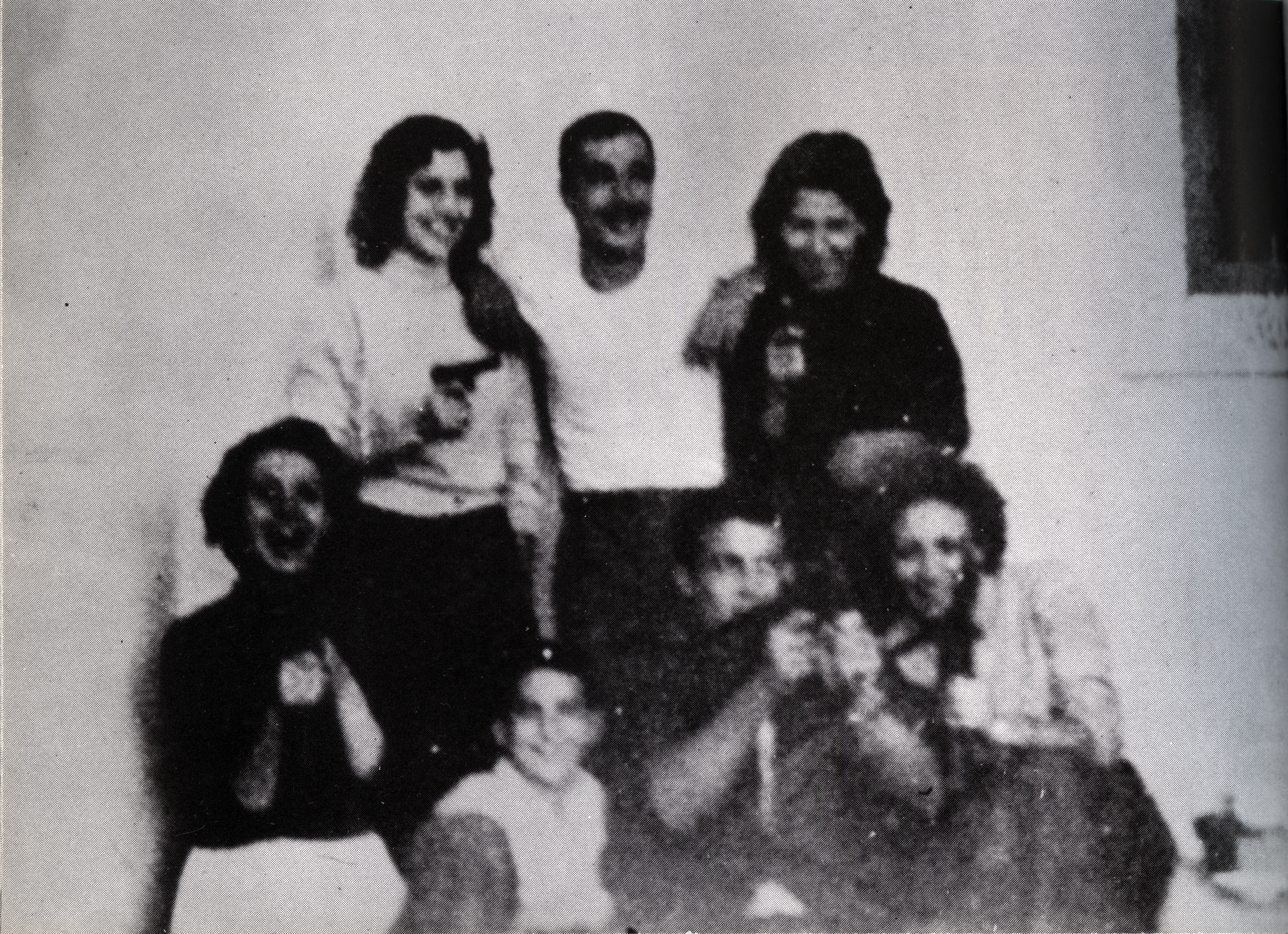
From left to right, at the back: Djamila Bouhired, Yacef Saâdi, Hassiba Ben Bouali. front: Samia Lakhdari, Petit Omar, Ali la Pointe with a gun in his hand and Zohra Drif.

In late 1955, Ali la Pointe was introduced to Yacef Saâdi, who was the deputy of Larbi Ben M'hidi, the head of the FLN for Algiers (known as the Zone autonome d'Alger, 'autonomous zone of Algiers) during the Algerian War. Yacef Saâdi "decided to test him", trusting him with the execution of a snitch on the evening of their meeting. Recruited for his "formidable qualities as a killer", he became "the chief assassin" for the FLN.

He was notably responsible for what was referred to as a "line-up of the Casbah underworld with the nationalist terrorist movement" from an article by The New York Times. After some figures of the local underworld suspected of being informants were executed, such as Rafai Abdelkader, Said Bud Abbot, and Hocine Bourtachi, he "sowed terror" in the Casbah by applying "revolutionary instructions, such as not allowing drinking alcohol or smoking".

On 30 September 1956, two bombs exploded in two public places in Algiers, the Milk Bar and the Cafétaria, killing 4 and wounding 52. They were planted by Zohra Drif and Samia Lakhdari, respectively, while a third bomb, planted by Djamila Bouhired at the Air France terminal, did not explode. These events mark the beginning of the Battle of Algiers. These three women, along with Djamila Bouazza, also planted a bomb on 26 January 1957 at the Coq Hardi brewery, part of the “bombs network” headed by Yacef Saâdi, assisted by Ali la Pointe.

== Legacy and commemoration ==
The character of Ali la Pointe is portrayed in the Italian-Algerian film The Battle of Algiers by Brahim Hadjadj. The director, Gillo Pontecorvo, describes him as "the hero of one of the most important and symbolic episodes of the Algerian war and, by extension, of Algerian national mythology". The film transforms him into an 'emblematic figure of the Battle of Algiers' and a 'martyr' of the Algerian national cause.

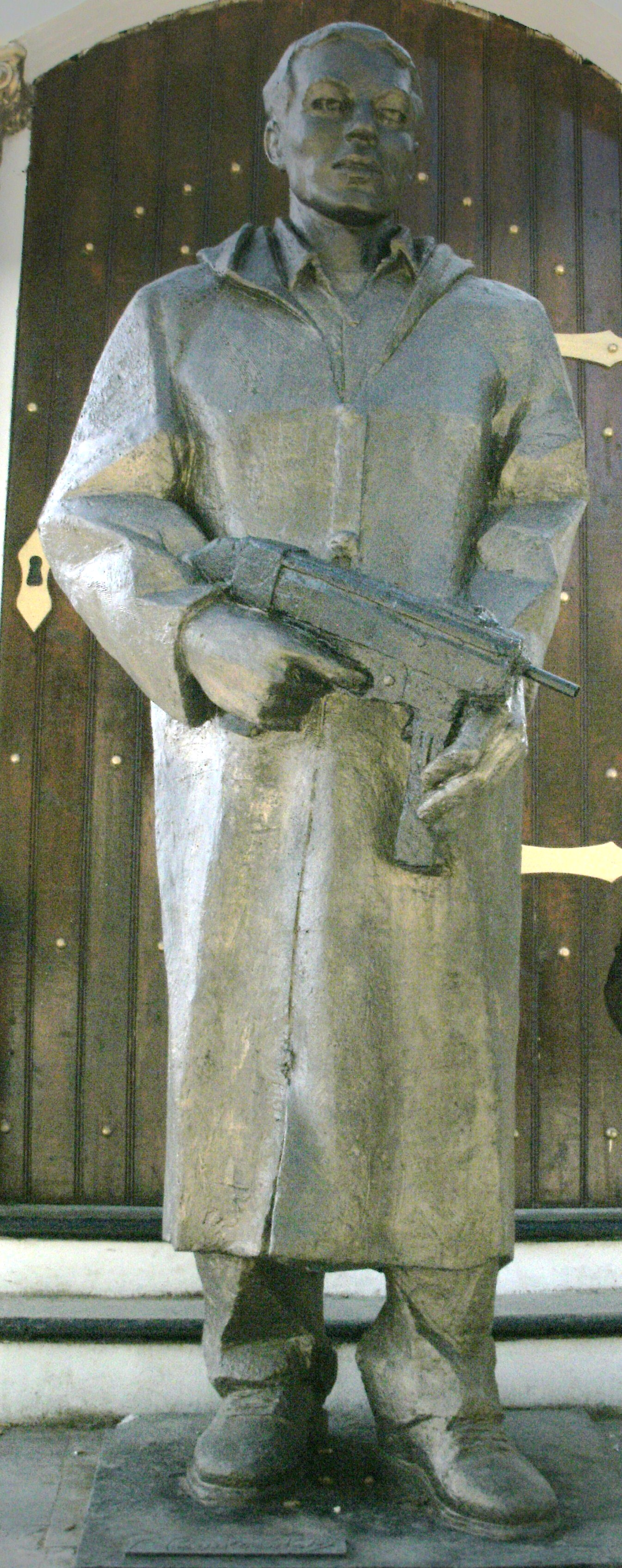
Statue of Ali La Pointe on the eponymous square in Miliana.

On November 1st, 2019, he was commemorated by Algérie Poste on a stamp, part of a series honoring the martyrs of the Algerian war.
