= Casbah Films =

Algerian film production company

Casbah Film
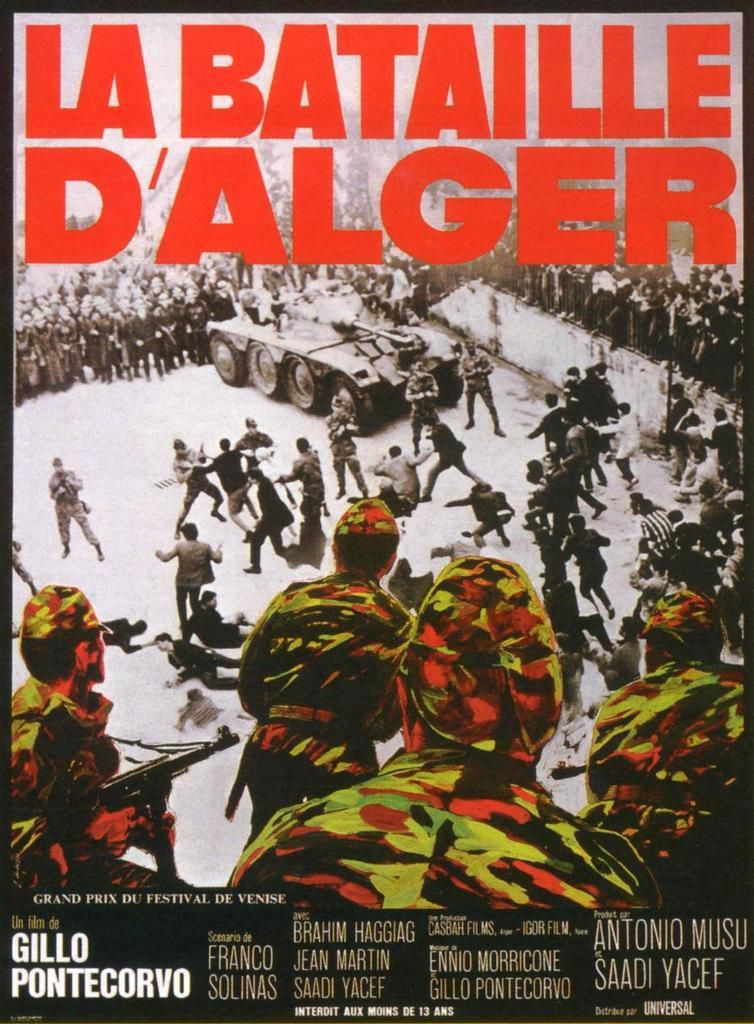
- Poster for The Battle of Algiers (1966), produced by Casbah Film
- Industry: Film production
- Founded: 1963
- Founder: Yacef Saadi
- Defunct: 1972
- Headquarters: Algiers, Algeria
- Area served: Algeria
- Products: Films

Casbah Film was an Algerian film production company founded by Yacef Saadi in 1963 in Algiers. It produced the historical film The Battle of Algiers (1966), directed by Gillo Pontecorvo in co-production with the Italian company Igor Film.

== History ==
After Algerian independence in 1962, the former head of the Autonomous Zone of Algiers of the FLN, Yacef Saadi, decided to establish a production company to bring his wartime memoirs and experiences to the screen. Casbah Film was created in 1963 and partnered with the Italian company Igor Film to produce The Battle of Algiers, shot in Algiers with the participation of former combatants and Casbah residents.

== Activities ==
Casbah Film name remains closely associated with The Battle of Algiers, a landmark political film that won major international prizes and became a worldwide reference in political cinema.

== Filmography ==
- 1964: Les Mains libres — production company credit.
- 1966: The Battle of Algiers — production (co-production with Igor Films).
- 1967: The Stranger (1967 film) — production credit.
- 1967: Death Walks in Laredo — participation / credit.

== Awards and recognition ==
The film The Battle of Algiers, produced by Casbah Film, received several major international awards:

- Venice Film Festival (Mostra di Venezia) 1966 — Golden Lion.
- 1969 — Nomination for the Academy Award for Best Foreign Language Film.
- 1969 — Nomination for Academy Award for Best Director (Gillo Pontecorvo).

== Images and media ==
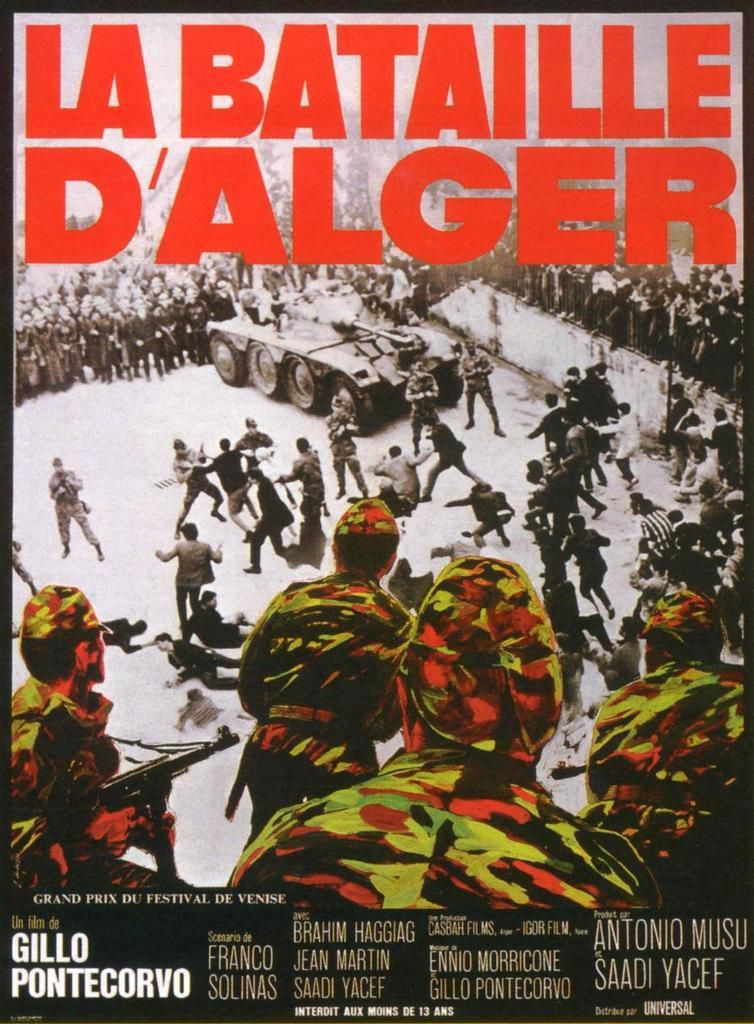
Original poster for The Battle of Algiers (1966)

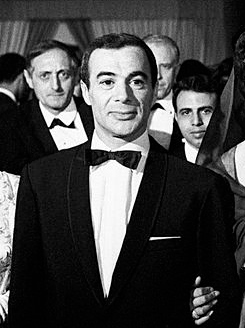
Yacef Saadi at the Venice Film Festival (1966)

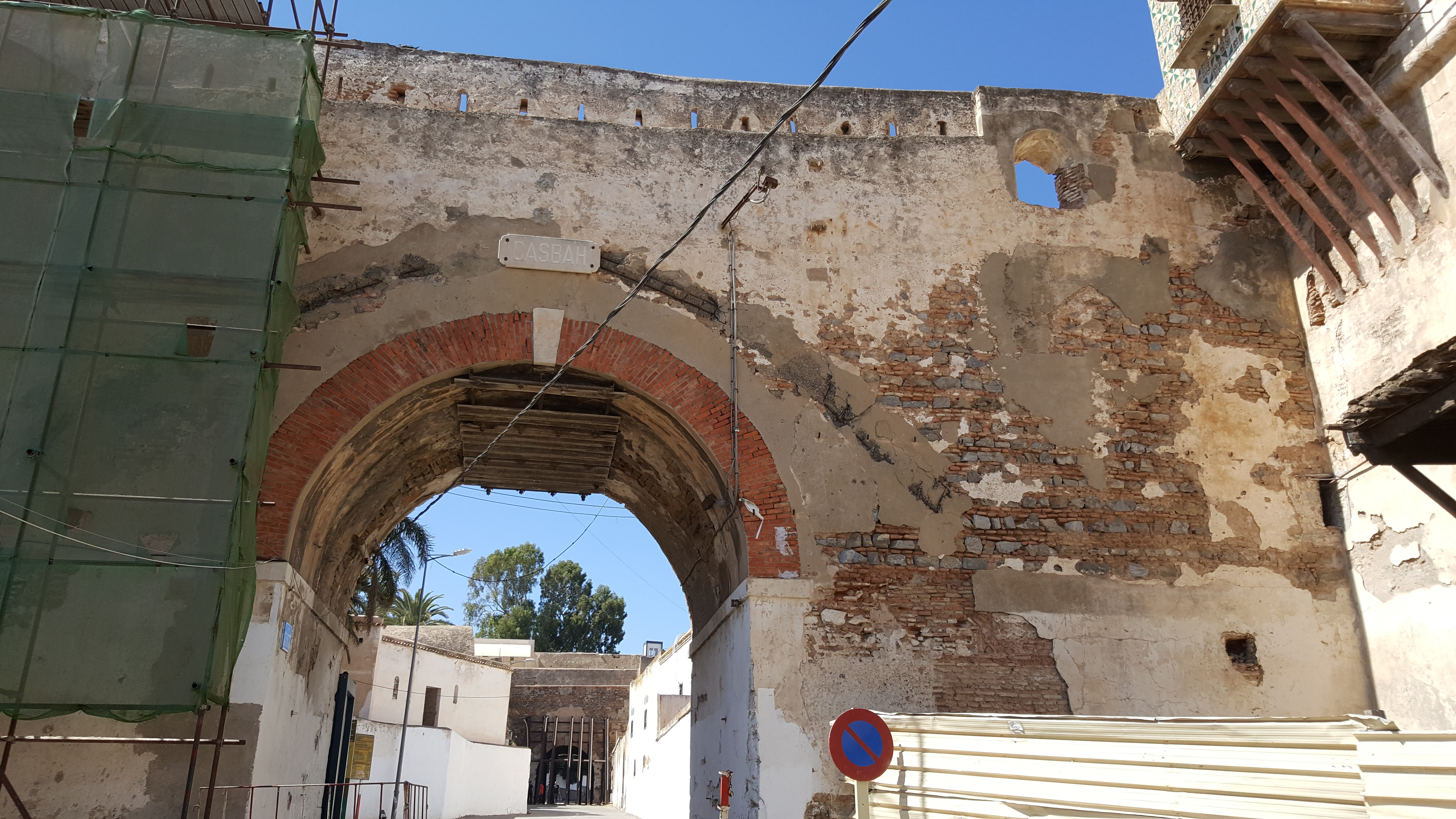
The Casbah of Algiers, emblematic location

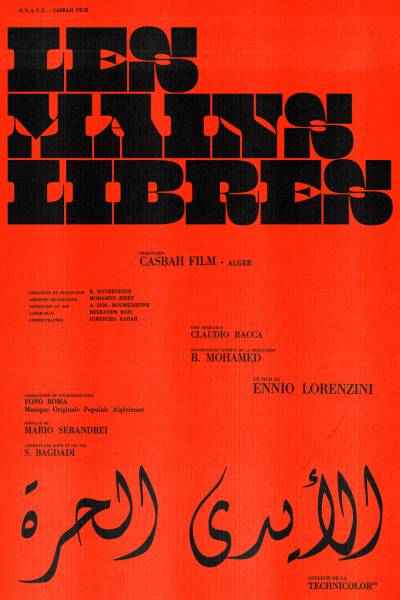
Poster for Les Mains libres

== Legacy and disposition ==
After producing four major works (Les Mains libres, The Battle of Algiers, The Stranger and Trois pistolets contre César), Yacef Saadi chose to withdraw from film production. He donated the production equipment and material of Casbah Film (cameras, gear, and shooting equipment) to the ONCIC.

== See also ==
- Yacef Saadi
- The Battle of Algiers
- Algerian cinema
