= Little Omar =

Algerian rebel (1944–1957)

Yacef Omar
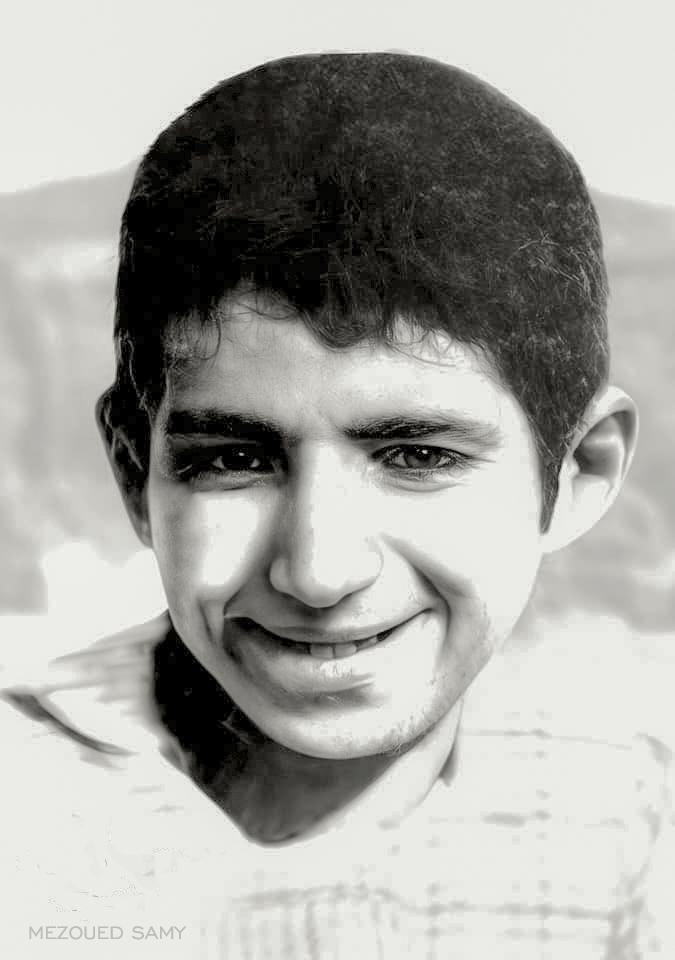

Personal details
- Born: January 1944 Algiers, French Algeria (present-day Algeria)
- Died: 8 October 1957 (aged 13) Algiers, French Algeria

Military service
- Allegiance: FLN
- Years of service: 1956–1957
- Battles/wars: Algerian War; Battle of Algiers

Yacef Omar, better known by his nom-de-guerre Petit Omar (meaning little Omar), was an Algerian child soldier and prominent figure of the Algerian War. He is best known for his involvement in the Battle of Algiers during the Algerian War.

== Biography ==
Yacef Omar was born in January 1944 at the Casbah citadel in Algiers to an ethnic Kabyle family (a Berber ethnic group predominant in Algeria). He was the third child in a family of nine children, and the nephew of Algerian revolutionary, Saadi Yacef. Omar grew up in a big familial house with Yacef, and came across prominent Algerian revolutionary figures like Abane Ramdane, Krim Belkacem, Colonel Ouamrane, Rabah Bitat, and Ali La Pointe who visited his uncle regularly. This inspired him to join the Algerian National Liberation Front (FLN), albeit his very young age. Little Omar became the liaison officer between the fighters and the leaders of the FLN during the Battle of Algiers. He was handed this mission which had great importance.

Working as a courier between the FLN militants and leadership, he was able to cross all police roadblocks and elude the French paratroopers in the hardest moments of the Battle of Algiers. He knew his neighborhood very well. Houria Bourihed, whose family was instrumental in the Algerian war for independence, remembers Omar not only as a war hero but also as an expert player of marbles and other street games.

On the night of October 8, 1957, French Army paratrooper commandos of the 1st Foreign Parachute Regiment destroyed the house where Omar was hiding alongside other FLN militants following their refusal to surrender. This killed him along with Hassiba Ben Bouali, Ali La Pointe, Hamid Bouhamidi and 16 others. He was 13 years old at the time of his death.

== In popular culture ==
Omar is played by Mohamed Ben Kassen in the 1966 Italian-Algerian movie The Battle of Algiers.

== See also ==
- Mohammad Hossein Fahmideh
