= Djamila Bouhired =

Algerian militant

Djamila Bouhired جميلة بوحيرد
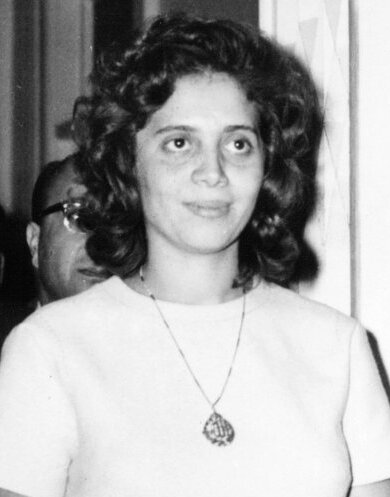
- Bouhired in 1962
- Born: June 1935 (age 91); Algiers, French Algeria (now Algeria)
- Organization: National Liberation Army (ALN)
- Movement: National Liberation Front (FLN)
- Spouse: Jacques Vergès (1965–1970)
- Children: 2

Djamila Bouhired (Arabic: جميلة بوحيرد; born June 1935) is an Algerian nationalist militant, who opposed the French colonial rule of Algeria as a member of the National Liberation Front (FLN).

In 1957, she was convicted alongside another Algerian rebel, Djamila Bouazza, of bombing a café and killing 11 people. She was sentenced to death, but the sentence was commuted after an international campaign led by activists, intellectuals, and her lawyer Jacques Vergès, who publicized allegations of the torture by the French army that she had gone through and criticized French colonial rule in Algeria. Her case attracted widespread attention in France and abroad. This turned her into a prominent symbol of colonial resistance during the Algerian War. She was released from prison in 1962.

== Biography ==
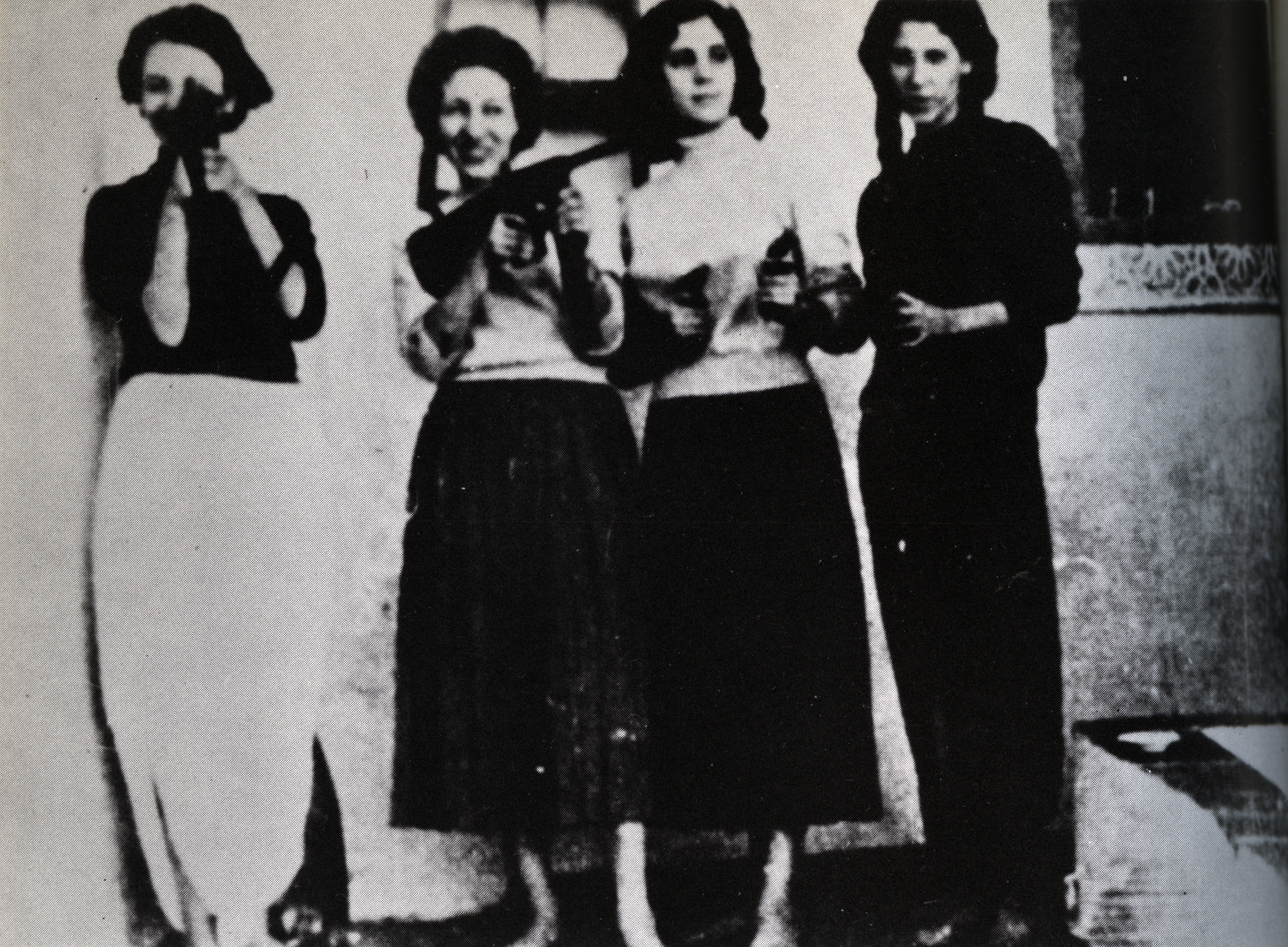
From left to right: Samia Lakhdari, Zohra Drif, Bouhired, and Hassiba Ben Bouali during the Algerian War

Djamila Bouhired was born into a middle-class family in the Al-Qasba neighborhood of Algiers, to an Algerian father and a Tunisian mother. As the only daughter among seven sons, she attended a French school. Her brothers were involved with the underground nationalist resistance movement, and Bouhired joined the National Liberation Front (FLN) while a student. During the Algerian War, she worked as a liaison agent for FLN commander Saadi Yacef in Algiers.

=== FLN involvement ===
Bouhired was recruited into the FLN through her uncle, Mustapha Bouhired, reflecting a wider pattern in which many Algerian women entered nationalist activism through family and kinship networks. However, Marnia Lazreg writes that Bouhired’s entry into the FLN was shaped by family circumstances, but that she was initially rejected by Saadi Yacef before later joining the urban guerrilla network in Algiers.

In the FLN urban network, women militants carried out tasks that challenged conventional gender expectations, including moving through Algiers alone and using Western-style dress to pass French checkpoints. Bouhired was initially assigned to Saadi Yacef's secret cell as a cook.

=== Arrest and Trial ===
In April 1957, Bouhired was captured in the Casbah of Algiers while carrying a briefcase containing documents. Djamila Amrane-Minne notes that later accounts claiming Saadi Yacef shot Bouhired to prevent her from speaking were inaccurate; in an interview, Bouhired said she lost consciousness after being wounded in the shoulder and did not remember the shooting. After her arrest, Bouhired was tortured at the site of her shoulder wound, including through the removal of her bandages and movement of her injured arm. While imprisoned, Bouhired and Djamila Bouazza were identified by Amrane-Minne as the first two women sentenced to death; a prison testimony cited by Amrane-Minne states that they were beaten and doused with cold water during winter.

In July 1957, she was tried for allegedly bombing a cafe frequented by French settlers, alongside Djamila Bouazza, aged 19. The colonial press gave extensive front-page coverage to the trial, focusing not only on the charges but also on the women's appearance, clothing and courtroom behaviour. At the time the French lawyer Jacques Vergès, sympathetic to the cause of the Algerian nationalists, heard of her case and decided to represent her. During the trial, Vergès waged a public relations campaign on Bouhired's behalf and used the courtroom as a political forum to denounce French military violence, torture and abuses of human rights. Despite Vergès's efforts, Bouhired was convicted and sentenced to death by guillotine.

=== Death sentence ===
Following the verdict, Vergès and Georges Arnaud published Pour Djamila Bouhired, a defence of Bouhired that challenged the legality of the military court and condemned the torture she was alleged to have suffered while in French custody. The case soon became an international campaign. Historian Mary Anne Lewis Cusato argues that Bouhired’s trial and death sentence moved beyond the military tribunal and became a public test of French justice and colonial legitimacy. Appeals for clemency came from abroad, including from various protest groups formed throughout Algeria and Princess Lalla Aicha of Morocco, who wrote to French president René Coty asking him to spare Bouhired’s life. After being spared, Bouhired served a prison sentence in the Reims prison until 1962. As the end of the war drew near, she was released along with many other Algerian prisoners. After president Coty commuted her death sentence on 13 March 1958, Bouhired was presented in parts of the French press as evidence of the power of public campaigns and international pressure.

Vergès claimed to have become a target of the French colonial government, which allegedly launched several failed assassination attempts against him, including a bomb placed in his apartment and another in his car.

== Post-war life ==
=== Following Algerian Independence ===
After Algerian independence, Bouhired continued to occupy a prominent symbolic role in nationalist politics. In November 1962, she travelled across the Middle East to raise funds for the Algerian war orphans’ organisation Al-Jil al-Jadid, which she jointly presided over with fellow veteran Zohra Drif. She was received in countries including Kuwait, Egypt, Syria, Morocco and Tunisia, and later travelled to China with Jacques Vergès in 1963. Bouhired also used her symbolic status to make political statements beyond Algeria. During the 1973 Arab–Israeli War, she and Zohra Drif sent an open letter to Syrian president Hafez al-Assad offering to join the Syrian army. Historian Natalya Vince also notes that Bouhired had previously attempted to persuade president Houari Boumédiène to send her to Vietnam, reflecting her continued association with pan-Arab and anti-imperialist causes. Her public role was not limited to official nationalist representation. In March 1963, Bouhired and Drif held a press conference criticising Arab states and the Algerian government for failing to fulfil promised donations to Al-Jil al-Jadid. After the first years of independence, Bouhired largely withdrew from public ceremonies, diplomatic visits and interviews, a withdrawal Vince interprets as possibly reflecting resistance to political manipulation.

=== Personal life ===
Bouhired and Vergès married a year after Algeria's independence, by which point Vergès had converted to Islam and taken the first name Mansoor. The couple had two children, Meriem and Liess Vergès. Bouhired separated from Vergés in 1970, after seven years together.

Bouhired's symbolic status also affected her private life. In a rare 1984 interview, she discussed the public controversy surrounding her marriage to Jacques Vergès, stating that she would not have married him had he not converted to Islam. Natalya Vince argues that public expectations surrounding Bouhired's image limited her personal choices and treated her as a public symbol rather than only as an individual.

=== Current political behaviour ===
In later political interventions, Bouhired joined other female veterans, including Fettouma Ouzegane, Zoulikha Bekaddour, Louisette Ighilahriz and Louisa Oudarène, in criticising state justifications for force against protesters by comparing them to arguments used by French authorities during the Battle of Algiers. Under presidents Ahmed Ben Bella and Houari Boumédiène, state-owned media presented Bouhired as a national heroine, especially during her post-independence diplomatic travels. According to Natalya Vince, her wartime legitimacy helped justify her role as a representative of the new Algerian nation, but she was generally portrayed as a symbol of a forward-looking post-colonial Algeria rather than as a figure of historical commemoration.

In the 2000s and 2010s, Bouhired participated in campaigns against the Algerian Family Code and voiced criticism of healthcare provision, urban development, and president Abdelaziz Bouteflika's fourth-term candidacy. As of 2019, Djamila Bouhired lived in Algiers, and continued to participate in protests and marches for several causes, including the 2019 Algerian protests.

=== Legacy and Cultural Representation ===
Djamila Bouhired became one of the most internationally recognized female figures in the Algerian War. Following her arrest in 1957, her imprisonment and torture received significant coverage through newspapers and political campaigns. Her case became central to international campaigns and many protestors to call for judicial reforms and the end to French colonial rule in Algeria.

Bouhired’s achievements were also celebrated in several films, such as through an Egyptian film titled Jamila, the Algerian (1958) by Youssef Chahine and The Battle of Algiers (1966) by Gillo Pontecorvo. She was also portrayed in Terror's Advocate (2007), a documentary film about Jacques Vergès and the controversial cases he assisted.

Scholars have described the international campaign as the "Djamila phenomenon", in which Bouhired became a symbol of colonial resistance in Algeria and the Arab World. Bouhired and other female militants of the National Liberation Front were also celebrated as national heroes after independence, and influenced cultural representations of the Algerian War through films. Historians have argued that Bouhired became a symbol not only of Algerian independence, but also of the role of women in anti-colonial resistance movements in general. Previously, many writings on the Algerian war have grown in writing, but seem to ignore women militancy. However, through films, books, journal articles, and political discussions, Djamila Bouhired's image became an important part of how the Algerian War has been remembered over time.

== Honours ==
- Algeria: Athir of the National Order of Merit (5 April 1997)
- Syria: Order of Civil Merit, Excellence Class (29 January 2009)
- Tunisia: Order of the Republic, 1st Class (22 January 2020)
