= Brahim Hadjadj =

Algerian actor

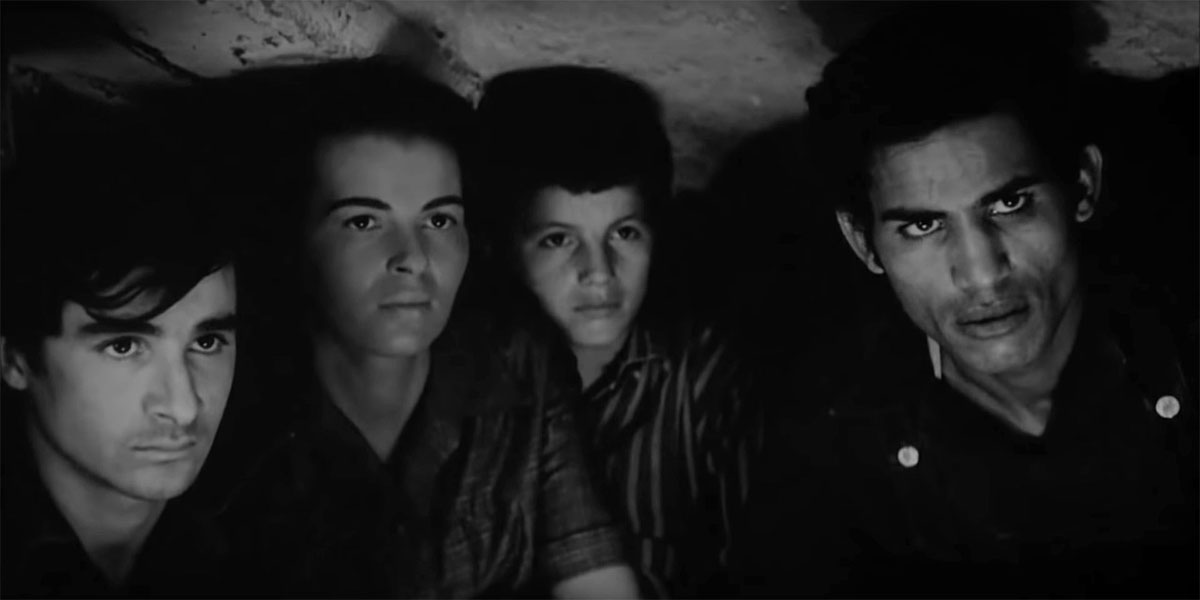
- Screenshot of "The Battle of Algiers". On the right Brahim Hadjadj playing Ali La Pointe
- Born: Brahim Hadjadj (إبراهيم حجاج); January 31, 1934; Médéa, Algeria
- Died: March 8, 1996 (aged 62); Algiers, Algeria
- Occupation: Actor
- Years active: 1966–1986

Brahim Hadjadj (Arabic: إبراهيم حجاج, January 31, 1934 – March 8, 1996) was an Algerian actor. He is most notable for the roles in the films The Battle of Algiers, Patrouille à l'Est and L'opium et le baton.

== Career ==
In 1966, he made the acting debut with the character of 'Ali La Pointe' in the film The Battle of Algiers directed by Gillo Pontecorvo. The film became a blockbuster in that year and Hadjadj was selected for the film L'opium et le baton, Les hors-la-loi and Chronicle of the Years of Fire.

Brahim Hadjadj's film career began with the film "The Battle of Algiers" (1966), directed by the Italian Gillo Pontecorvo. The 32-year-old actor plays the leading role, that of the Algerian revolutionary hero Ali Ammar (1930-1957), known in the popular imagination under the pseudonym "Ali La Pointe" which he wore during his period of struggle against French colonial army, died during the bombing of their Casbah hideout by the French colonizers. The film, based on real events, recounts the attack on the Casbah of Algiers, stronghold of the resistance and revolutionaries, very important in the process which led Algeria to its independence, including Yacef Saâdi (1928-2021), a historical figurehead, participated in the writing of the screenplay and production, plays his real character in the film.

Initially banned in France, the first release of the film on French screens dates from 1970 and was accompanied by numerous threats and pressure, going as far as attacks perpetrated against cinemas. The torture used by the French army and shown in the film was one of the reasons for its censorship until 2004, when it was finally shown at the Cannes Film Festival... The film received, among others, the Lion of However, at the Venice Film Festival in 1966, Pontecorvo received the Oscar for best director in 1979…. The broadcast of "The Battle of Algiers" will be global. According to the ranking established by Sight & Sound, the British Film Institute's cinema magazine, The Battle of Algiers is ranked 48th out of the 50 best films of all time. The film serves as a model of theoretical instruction in military and technical schools, to understand the logic of guerrilla warfare in an urban environment.

Following the international success of the film, Brahim Hadjadj gained recognition in Algeria and abroad for his portrayal of Ali La Pointe. His performance became closely associated with the character, contributing to his prominence within Algerian cinema.

The film depicted aspects of the Algerian War, including the actions of the French military, and attracted international attention for its subject matter. Hadjadj’s role reflected themes of resistance and anti-colonial struggle, which resonated with audiences in Algeria and other regions during the period.

There is a whole mythology around the attribution of the role of Ali La Pointe to Brahim Hadjadj. The most plausible and simplest is that he stuck perfectly to the character during the tests during the casting. Others say that the director Gillo Pontecorvo, seated on the terrace of the "Tantonville" café in the Algerian capital, saw Hadjadj passing-by, by chance, and offered him the role. He had met Ali Ammar, the real "Ali La Pointe", and immediately saw the compatibility of the two characters. In addition, the "Latin" type of Brahim would have allowed a better "hook" on the hero on the part of the foreign public. In these assumptions, the most important thing is that Gillo Pontecorvo found the naturalness, spontaneity and grace that he was looking for in Brahim, the dark brunette, for his reality cinema film that he wanted to be as close as possible to documentary. In the documentary "Marxist Poetry: The Making of The Battle of Algiers", released in 2004, we can see the director miming all the sequences to Hadjadj before the takes.

Brahim Hadjadj had no dramatic training and a basic level of school education. He was thirty years old, dragging his carefreeness through the streets of the Casbah and the newly independent capital, like the other young men of that era. His passage from shadow to light after "The Battle of Algiers" was dazzling. He suddenly found himself hounded by the press, bombarded with questions, which according to him, went beyond his cultural level. Interested people flocked to him, beautiful women too. While being an object of desire, the actor, overwhelmed by his new status, still lived as before, day to day.

Rumor has it that the director wanted to take Brahim Hadjadj to Italy to pursue his film career, to play the role of anti-colonial revolutionary José Dolores in the historical film "Queimada" in 1969 by the same Gillo Pontecorvo. Hadjadj, then without an agent to manage his career, rarely punctually, gave rise to serious doubts in the production company which considered him risky and not very rigorous for such a substantial project. Brahim unreachable, the role was attributed to the Colombian actor Evaristo Márquez who shared the poster with the legend Marlon Brando.

Brahim Hadjadj continued his career according to the proposals made to him, including Luchino Visconti in 1967 in "L'Étranger", in 1969 in "L'Opium Et Le Bâton" by Ahmed Rachedi, in the role of Omar, in 1971 in "Patrouille À l'Est" by Amar Laskri, in 1974 Ahmed Rachedi in "The Finger in the Gear", in 1975 Mohammed Lakhdar-Hamina in the cult "Chronique Des Années De Braise", in 1986 he was Si Omar in "The Roaring Years of the Twist" by Mahmoud Zemmouri...

In the 90s, in the middle of the dark decade, bomb attacks increased in Algiers and throughout the country, culture was no longer a priority for institutions, and a good number of intellectuals, journalists and artists, threatened, flee the country. The last years of Brahim Hadjadj's life, in the suburbs of the Algerian capital, in the Cherarba district, were difficult. Hadjadj is diagnosed with a brain tumor. While it took time to raise the funds to send him abroad for an operation, he died on March 8, 1996, in Algiers.

Years later, the face and name of Brahim Hadjadj are still deeply engraved in the collective memory of Algerians and moviegoers around the world who praise his performance in "The Battle of Algiers", notably in numerous YouTube vlogs and podcasts specializing in cinema. In the bonus documentary "Five Directors On The Battle of Algiers", released in 2004 in the restored DVD reissue of "The Battle of Algiers", Oliver Stone, Spike Oliver, Steven Soderbergh, Mira Nair and Julian Schnabel praise the performance of Brahim Hadjadj and explains how the film Gillo Pontecorvo influenced their own work and careers.

== Filmography ==
Year	Film	Role	Genre	Ref.
1966	The Battle of Algiers	Ali La Pointe	Film	
1967	The Stranger	Arab	Film	
1969	L'Opium et le Bâton	Omar	Film	
1969	Les hors-la-loi	Charretier	Film	
1971	Patrouille à l'est		Film	
1974	Le Doigt dans l'engrenage		Film	
1975	Chronicle of the Years of Fire		Film	
1985	Buamama		Film	
