= Bouazza =

Bouazza is a surname. Notable people with the surname include:

- Ahmed Bouazza (born 1940), Moroccan boxer
- Djamila Bouazza (1938–2015), Algerian militant
- Hafid Bouazza (1970–2021), Moroccan-Dutch writer
- Hamer Bouazza (born 1985), French footballer
