= Ogro =

Ogro Operación Ogro
- Spanish DVD cover
- Directed by: Gillo Pontecorvo
- Written by: Giorgio Arlorio; Ugo Pirro; Gillo Pontecorvo
- Produced by: Franco Cristaldi; José Sámano
- Starring: Gian Maria Volonté; José Sacristán; Ángela Molina; Eusebio Poncela; Ana Torrent
- Cinematography: Marcello Gatti
- Edited by: Mario Morra
- Music by: Ennio Morricone
- Release dates: 28 September 1979 (Italy); 5 April 1980 (Spain)
- Running time: 100 minutes
- Countries: Spain; Italy
- Language: Spanish

Ogro (also known as Operación Ogro) is a 1979 Spanish and Italian drama film written and directed by Gillo Pontecorvo.

The film is based on true events in Spain during the early 1970s and is based on the eponymous book by Eva Forest (written under the pseudonym Julen Agirre).

The film won the David di Donatello (an annual Italian motion picture award) for Best Film.

All the actors, a mix of Spaniards and Italians, spoke Spanish in the dubbed version released in Spain, and Italian in the dubbed Italian version.

== Plot ==
This drama documentary film describes the attack - known as Operación Ogro - made by four Basque separatist members of ETA, on 20 December 1973 against Luis Carrero Blanco known also as the "Ogro" (ogre). Under the pretence of being bank officials the men involved - Ezarra, Txabi, Iker and Luken - settle in Madrid and plan to kidnap the "Ogro" from the church where he goes to mass each morning. In return for his release they plan to demand the release of 150 Basque political prisoners. However the planning has to change since Carrero Blanco becomes Spanish Prime Minister and Henry Kissinger was set to come visit him, all the security measures around him were multiplied. They then decide to blow him up with a bomb laid under the road upon which his car is going to pass. They dig a tunnel and lay the explosives and the assassination occurs.

== Cast ==
- Gian Maria Volonté: Izarra
- José Sacristán: Iker
- Ángela Molina: Amaiur
- Eusebio Poncela: Txabi
- Saverio Marconi: Luque
- Georges Staquet: The builder
- Nicole Garcia: Karmele
- Féodor Atkine: José María Uriarte (alias Yoseba)
- Estanis González
- Agapito Romo: Luis Carrero Blanco
- José Manuel Cervino: The milkman
- Ana Torrent: Basque girl

== History ==
Operación Ogro ("Operation Ogre") was the name given by ETA to the assassination of Luis Carrero Blanco, the then Prime Minister of Spain in 1973 and the successor of Spanish caudillo Francisco Franco. This attack was carried out on 20 December 1973.

An ETA commando group using the code name Txikia (after the nom de guerre of ETA activist Eustakio Mendizabal killed by the Guardia Civil in April 1973) rented a basement flat at Calle Claudio Coello 104, Madrid on the route over which Carrero Blanco used to go to Mass at San Francisco de Borja church.

Over five months, this group dug a tunnel under the street - telling the landlord that they were student sculptors to disguise their real purpose. The tunnel was packed with 80 kg of explosives that had been stolen from a Government depot.

On 20 December 1973, a 3-man ETA commando group disguised as electricians detonated the explosives by command wire as Carrero Blanco's Dodge Dart passed. The explosion sent Carrero Blanco and his car 20 metres into the air and over a five-storey building. The car crashed down to the ground on the opposite side of a Jesuit college, landing on the second-floor balcony. Carrero Blanco survived the blast but died shortly afterwards. His bodyguard and driver were killed instantly. The "electricians" shouted to stunned passers-by that there had been a gas explosion, and subsequently escaped in the confusion.
