= Zohra Drif =

Algerian politician (born 1934)

Zohra Drif-Bitat
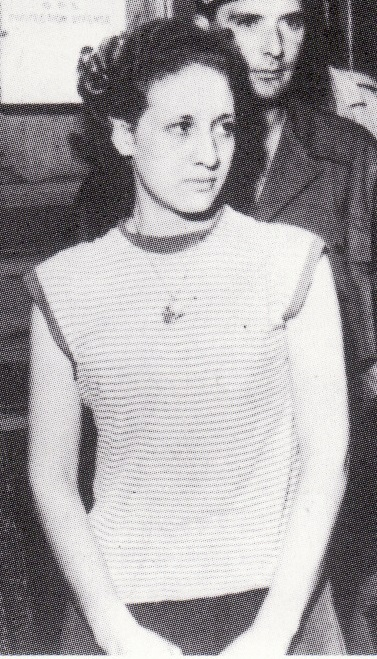
- Zohra Drif in 1957

Member of the Council of the Nation
- In office 6 January 2001 – 10 January 2016

Member of the Constituent National Assembly
- In office 25 September 1962 – 20 September 1964

Personal details
- Born: Zohra Drif; 28 December 1934 (age 91) Tissemsilt, French Algeria
- Party: Front de Libération Nationale (FLN)
- Spouse: Rabah Bitat (m. 1962; died 2000)
- Education: University of Algiers
- Occupation: Lawyer (retired)

Military service
- Branch/service: Armée de Libération Nationale (ALN)

Zohra Drif Bitat (Arabic: زهرة ظريف بيطاط, romanized: Zuhra Ḍrīf Bīṭāṭ; born 28 December 1934) is a retired Algerian lawyer, moudjahid (a militant of the Algerian War of Independence), and the vice-president of the Council of the Nation, the upper house of the Algerian Parliament. Drif was born in Tissemselt, Algeria, part of the province of Tiaret, where her grandfather was an imam and her father served as a lawyer and judge in Tiaret. She is best known for her activities on behalf of the National Liberation Front (FLN) during the Algerian War of Independence.

Drif was married to Rabah Bitat, one of the heads of the FLN and president of the National Assembly. In Algeria, she is considered a heroine in the Algerian War of Independence against French colonisation. She was a part of the FLN's bomb network and during the Algerian War of Independence, she worked with Ali La Pointe, Hassiba Ben Bouali, and Yacef Saâdi, head of the Autonomous Zone of Algiers. During the war she is most known for conducting the bombing of the Milk Bar Café in 1956, which killed three women and permanently injured others, including children.

== Early life ==
Drif was born into an upper-class, traditional Algerian family and was raised in the countryside. She grew up in Vialar. Drif's father was a well-established lawyer and reached the status of qadi. She attended an elite secondary school, Lycée Fromentin, in Algiers, and later studied law at the University of Algiers from 1954. It was at Lycée Fromentin that she met her close friend, and later fellow member of the FLN, Samia Lakhdari. However, her increased involvement in the FLN affected her grades and she was forced to put her studies on hold. Drif developed ideals that were both feminist and anti-colonial. In her memoir, Drif cites her family and friends as a key influence on her ideals, in particular her mother but also her brother who was also involved in the freedom struggle and suffered with mental health difficulties as a result. Also her relationship with Samia Lakhdari's family with whom she had philosophical debates which proved fundamental in founding her beliefs. Furthermore, Drif cites the influence of French Revolutionary and Enlightenment Philosophers as a key influence in her upbringing, in particular looking to the 1793 “Declaration of the Rights of Man and of the Citizen,” as well as other key thinkers such as Danton, Montesquieu and Clémenceau. For Drif, the overwhelming contradiction of individual rights and liberties professed in French philosophy was a direct contradiction to her experiences of French Colonialism.

== Participation with the FLN ==
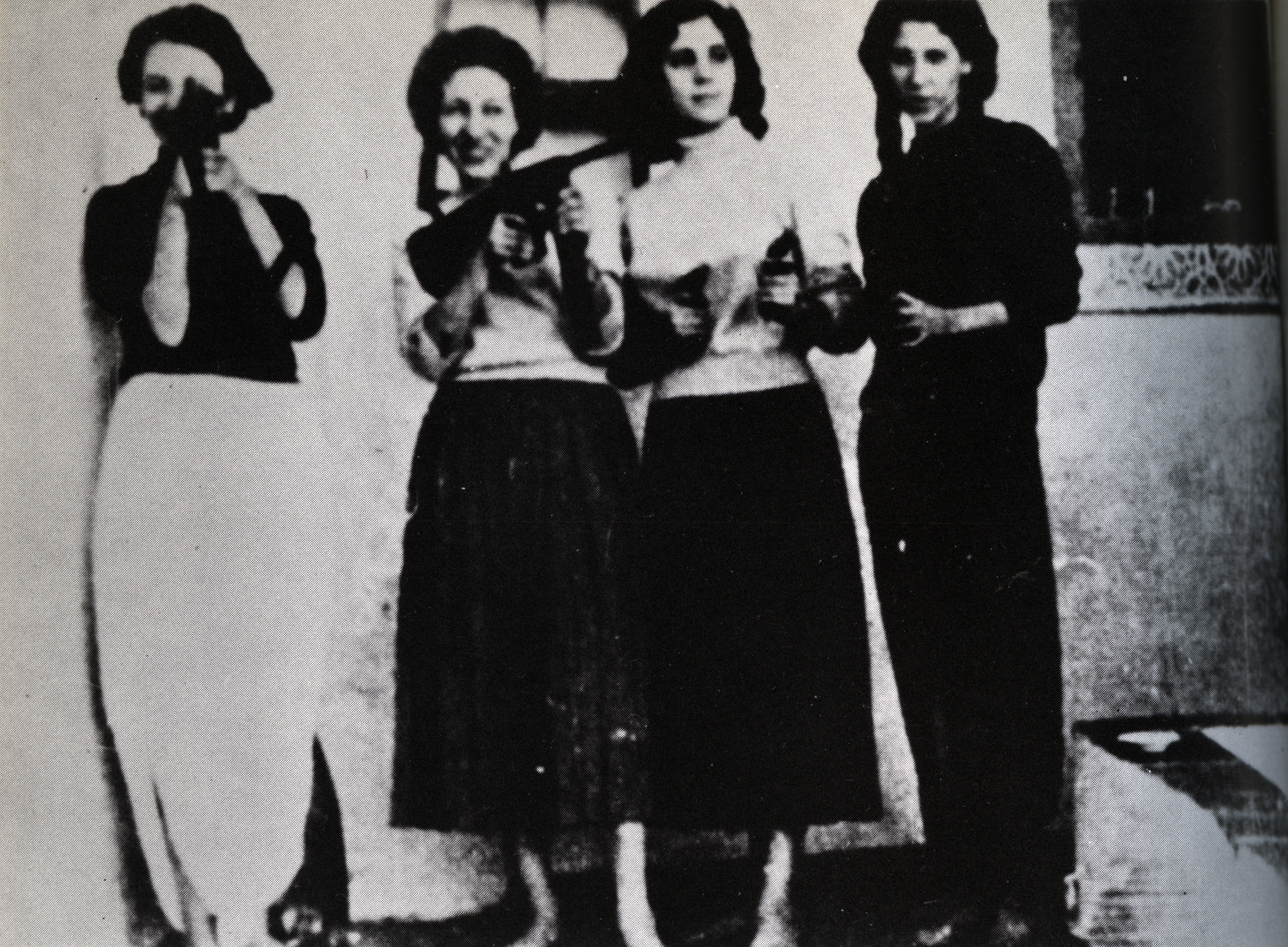
Drif (second to left) with the installers of bombs (Algerian War)

Drif also played an active role in the activities of the FLN around this time alongside Djamila Bouhired and Hassiba Ben Bouali. She joined the revolutionary movement early on during her studies at the University of Algiers as she was involved in the Autonomous Zone of Algiers. Later, with her friend Samia Lakhdari Drif joined the FLN, initially participating mainly through delivering packages and supporting the struggle in distant ways. It was later, in 1956 that Drif became more involved in the armed ranks of the FLN following the arrest of key FLN figures which motivated Drif and many others to join the struggle.

Drif has frequently explained her role in the revolution as well as the importance of women in the revolution. In her memoir, Drif supports the belief that women brought a unique asset to the movement and were able to complete tasks and operate under less suspicion than their male colleagues. This became especially important when Drif was involved in the bombing campaign and was able to disguise herself in European clothing to discreetly access parts of the city she would have otherwise not be allowed to go. She used such a disguise in the 1956 Milk Bar Café Bombing. Furthermore, the use of violence against women, especially young female students, was seen as especially damaging to the Colonial image and therefore employed by the FLN as a valuable propaganda tool to build sympathy for their efforts.

In January 1957, the French authorities declared the Battle of Algiers and the ZAA was heavily hit by French paratroopers commanded by General Massu. In July and August 1957, Drif attended two interviews between Yacef Saâdi and Germaine Tillion on 4 July and 9 August.

== Milk Bar Café bombing (1956) ==
On 30 September 1956, Drif's unit, consisting of her and two other female revolutionaries, Samia Lakhdari and Djamila Bouhired, was directed to carry out a bombing. Each of the women chose their own location for the bomb. While Samia Lakhdari selected Rue Michelet and Djamila Boupacha chose the Air France Office, Drif selected the popular Milk Bar Café to plant her bomb. In her memoir she recalls visiting the site prior to the attack and practicing her exact movements under timed conditions to perfect her act. Furthermore, on the day of the bombing she remembers dressing in a European-style summer dress and getting a European haircut to ensure she would blend in at the café. While the bomb planted in the Air France Office did not explode, the one on Rue Michelet as well as Drif's at the Milk Bar Café did. Drif's attack killed four young women and injured others, including children who lost limbs.

In the aftermath of the attack, Drif recalls in her memoir feeling not guilt or shame but rather pride at her success. In particular she recalls feeling justified in her actions through the belief she was merely responding to years of colonial repression and violence. Furthermore, she reflects on this attack as a decisive turning point as it triggered an international interest into the ‘Algerian Situation’ and brought the issue of independence to the world stage.

Furthermore, Drif recalls the ease with which the Colonial Authorities accused the innocent Algerian Communist Party member Raymonde Peschard as alarming. Drif suggests this further cemented her dedication to the movement as it confirmed that the French Authorities did not see their dedication to principles of equality and liberty as relevant in Algeria.

== Involvement in the FLN after 1956 ==
Following the Milk Bar Café bombing, Drif became more devoted to the work of the FLN. While her ambitious plans for a bombing to be staged at the Préfecture were suppressed by those more senior in the movement, Drif's contributions remained significant. In particular she became a key figure in concealing and supporting those who were wanted by colonial authorities.

Furthermore, her involvement in the eight-day strike, a movement to demonstrate the entire Algerian population's dedication to the Freedom Movement was particularly significant and further brought the issue of independence to the international stage. In particular Drif was pivotal in coordinating unions and guilds prior to the strike as well as giving advice to the wider popular as to how they could support the strike. Furthermore, alongside Djamila Bouhired, Drif was responsible for monitoring the impact of the strike on citizens, especially women and children. She avoided the streets by climbing across the rooftops and spoke to women and children from their homes. Drif reflects on the strike and assesses that, in spite of the huge amount of violence and repression it triggered, it was an immense success and she suggests proved to the Colonial Authorities and France that Algeria would be successful in its struggle for independence.

Immediately before her arrest, Drif was particularly passionate about bringing more women into the movement, seeing them as vital assets to its success. In particular her efforts were directed toward the establishment of the distinct women's branch of the FLN which would campaign against arrest, torture, and abuse by the hands of Colonial Authorities. She was working on staging a large sit-in of women in front of the Préfecture and mobilising women to join this protest.

== Arrest and imprisonment ==
Prior to her arrest, Drif was aware of the fact she was increasingly pursued by colonial authorities and from April 1957 she had had close calls with capture. Furthermore, the capture of those close to Drif including her friend Djamila Bouhired further made her aware and cautious to the possibility of capture.

Drif's final safe house was on 4 rue Canton which she moved to in April 1957 and stayed in until her eventual capture and arrest on 22 September 1957. Drif was arrested alongside her colleague and military chief of the ZAA's Yacef Saâdi. Saâdi and Drif were taken by Villa Nador In the centre of Algiers. She was interviewed by the Colonial Authorities and held in solitary confinement but never subjected to the brutal torture methods synonymous with the regime.

In August 1958, Drif was sentenced to 20 years of hard labour by the military tribunal of Algiers for terrorism, and was locked up in the women's section of the Barbarossa prison. After her initial imprisonment, she was transferred between various French prisons. She published a 20-page treatise, entitled The death of my brothers (French: la Mort de mes frères), in 1960, while still in prison. Drif was eventually pardoned by Charles de Gaulle on the occasion of Algerian independence in 1962. During her time in prison however, Drif had continued her legal studies.

== After independence ==
After her liberation from prison, Drif went on to create an organization for youth who were orphaned during the Algerian War of Independence, while also working as a criminal lawyer in Algiers. She went on to be one of the first women elected to the Algerian Council of the Nations, where she continued to work for 15 years. She was a member until January 2016.

Ultimately she became the Vice President. During her time on the council, she presided over the "le Groupe d’amitié Algérie-France" (Algerian-French Goodwill group), where her role was to "promote relations of friendship between the French people," "relations of confidence" "between the Algerian and French parliaments,"..." to discuss the problems that interest our two populations to be frank". In the same speech, she indicated that "since the Declaration of the 1 November 1954, the FLN said, and remained constant, that they fought against colonial forces and not the French people."

She was one of the founding critics of the "Code de la Famille" when it was enacted in 1984. The Family Code was subject to much criticism and many of the same female militants, including Drif, who participated in the war continued to march in the 1980s against the Family Code and Islamic fundamentalism and gender inequality in Algeria after the war.

Although she was considered a heroine in the War of Algerian Independence by her generation, her place in political life has become criticised by younger generations. The mujahideen that fought for the Algerian independence have been accused of taking privileges after the liberation (pensions, priority employment, credit, taxi licenses and debit cards) granted by the Algerian state. The resistors, in part because of their place and influence, were assimilated into a space of privilege that can still cause problems. Drif was appointed to the Senate of Algeria and in her position, like others of the older mujahideen, was targeted with much animosity. She was a victim of many accusations, all difficult to verify, but all very critical in the Algerian public. Most notably, in January 2014, her old companion in the resistance, Yacef Saâdi, accused her of selling out Ali La Pointe.

== Personal life ==
Drif is the widow of former Algerian president Rabah Bitat. Drif and Bitat went on to have three children and five grandchildren. They were married until his death in 2000.

Drif also remained politically active after the war. For example, she was involved in demonstrations against the Family Code in the 1980s. Since her retirement from the Algerian government, she has gone on to publish her memoirs and participate in many speaking engagements around the world.

== Books ==
- Drif, Zohra (2017). Inside the Battle of Algiers : Memoir of a Woman Freedom Fighter. Just World Books. ISBN 9781682570753.

== Films ==
- The Battle of Algiers – 1966 film based on real events

== See also ==
- Café Wars
- Women in the Algerian War
- National Liberation Front
