= Vie Nuove =

Italian communist weekly magazine (1946–1978)

- Categories: Political magazine
- Frequency: Weekly
- Founder: Luigi Longo
- Founded: 1946
- Final issue: 1978
- Country: Italy
- Based in: Rome
- Language: Italian

Vie Nuove (Italian: New Ways) was a weekly popular magazine published in Rome, Italy, between 1946 and 1978. The magazine was one of the post-war publications of the Italian Communist Party which used it to attract larger sections of the population.

== History and profile ==
Vie Nuove was launched by the Communist Party in 1946 with the goal of informing the party members about recent developments. Another function of the magazine was to develop and disseminate a positive image of the Soviet Union focusing on its technical superiority over the Western capitalist countries.

The first issue of Vie Nuove appeared on 22 September 1946. Its founder was Luigi Longo who also edited the magazine. It was headquartered in Rome. The last issue with the original title was published on 21 April 1971, and it appeared with the title Giorni – Vie nuove until 1978.

== Editors-in-chief ==
The editors-in-chief of Vie Nuove included Luigi Longo (from September 1946 to November 1956), Maria Antonietta Macciocchi (from November 1956 to November 1961), Giorgio Cingoli (from November 1961 to January 1963), Paolo Bracaglia Morante (from January 1963 to September 1967), Mario Melloni (from October 1967 to May 1969) and Davide Lajolo (from June 1969 to 1978).

== Contributors and content ==
Historian Paolo Spriano was one of the contributors. Another contributor was Maria Musu. Italian director Pier Paolo Pasolini published his writings in a column in the magazine in which he also replied the questions of readers concerning literature, religion, Marxist theory, among others. The column was titled Dialoghi con Passolini (Italian: Passolini in Dialogue) and lasted from 28 May 1960 to 30 September 1965 with one year interruption between 1963 and September 1964.

Vie Nuovo sponsored beauty contests like its sister publications L'Unità and Pattuglia . The magazine valued the female movie stars of the 1950s, including Gina Lollobrigida, Silvana Mangano and Sophia Loren and frequently covered articles about them. However, it was against photoromances arguing that these were the tools for bourgeois and capitalist propaganda which mortified women due to the fact they were sexually objectified in their photographs.

== Circulation ==
In 1952 Vie Nuovo reached the highest circulation selling 350,000 copies. Next year its circulation was 200,000 copies. The magazine sold 125-130,000 copies in 1963. Its circulation was between 114,000 and 120,000 copies in late 1966.
