= Pattuglia =

Italian communist satirical magazine (1948–1953)

- Editor: Dario Valori; Ugo Pecchioli
- Former editors: Gillo Pontecorvo
- Categories: Satirical magazine; Political magazine
- Frequency: Weekly
- Publisher: Italian Communist Youth Federation
- Founded: 1948
- Final issue: 28 November 1953
- Country: Italy
- Based in: Milan
- Language: Italian

Pattuglia (Italian: Patrol) was a weekly communist satirical magazine published between 1948 and 1953 in Milan, Italy. It was official media outlet of the youth organization of the Italian Communist Party. Its subtitle was il corriere dei giovani (Italian: The courier of young people).

== History and profile ==
Pattuglia was launched in Milan in 1948 as a weekly. The magazine was organ of the Italian Communist Youth Federation (Federazione Giovanile Comunista Italiana), a youth organization affiliated with the Italian Communist party. Its stated goal was to education, guidance and organization of the communist youth. Dario Valori and Gillo Pontecorvo coedited the magazine until 1950 when Pontecorvo was replaced by Ugo Pecchioli. Then it was coedited by Valori and Pecchioli. The magazine targeted the radical youth members of the Communist Party and had a clear anti-American and pro-Soviet political stance. It frequently attacked anti-Communist Italian politicians such as Alcide De Gasperi, Randolfo Pacciardi, Guido Gonella and Carlo Carretto. The magazine praised the Soviet leader Josef Stalin and published a hagiographical issue following his death in 1953. It featured vignettes by the Soviet cartoonist Boris Yefimov and Michele Majorana. Enrico Berlinguer who was the secretary of the Federation, Giovanni Berlinguer, Italo Calvino, Ivano Cipriani, Sandro Curzi, Antonio Ghirelli, Renato Mieli, Mario Pirani, Gianni Rodari and Marcello Venturi were among its contributors. The magazine sponsored beauty contests like its sister publications L'Unità and Vie Nuove.

Pattuglia folded on 28 November 1953 partly due to its inability to reach militant youth masses.
