= The Battle of Algiers =

1966 film by Gillo Pontecorvo

- U.S. theatrical release poster
- French: La Bataille d'Alger; Italian: La battaglia di Algeri; Arabic: Maʿrakat al-Jazāʾir
- Directed by: Gillo Pontecorvo
- Screenplay by: Franco Solinas
- Story by: Franco Solinas; Gillo Pontecorvo
- Based on: Souvenirs de la Bataille d'Alger by Saadi Yacef
- Produced by: Antonio Musu; Saadi Yacef
- Starring: Jean Martin; Saadi Yacef; Brahim Hadjadj; Tommaso Neri
- Cinematography: Marcello Gatti
- Edited by: Mario Morra; Mario Serandrei
- Music by: Ennio Morricone; Gillo Pontecorvo
- Color process: Black and white
- Production companies: Igor Film; Casbah Films
- Distributed by: Allied Artists (USA)
- Release dates: August 31, 1966 (Venice); September 9, 1966 (Italy); September 27, 1966 (Algeria)
- Running time: 136 minutes (original version); 120 minutes (cut version for theaters)
- Countries: Italy; Algeria
- Languages: Arabic; French
- Budget: $806,735
- Box office: $879,794 (domestic)

The Battle of Algiers (French: La Bataille d'Alger; Italian: La battaglia di Algeri; Arabic: معركة الجزائر, romanized: Maʿrakat al-Jazāʾir) is a 1966 Italian-Algerian war film co-written and directed by Gillo Pontecorvo. It is based on action undertaken by rebels during the Algerian War (1954–1962) against the French government in North Africa, the most prominent being the eponymous Battle of Algiers, the capital of Algeria. It was shot on location in a Roberto Rossellini-inspired newsreel style: in black and white with documentary-type editing to add to its sense of historical authenticity, with mostly non-professional actors who had lived through the real battle. The film's score was composed by Pontecorvo and Ennio Morricone. It is often associated with Italian neorealist cinema.

The film concentrates mainly on revolutionary fighter Ali La Pointe during the years between 1954 and 1957, when guerrilla fighters of the FLN went into Algiers. Their actions were met by French paratroopers attempting to regain territory. The highly dramatic film is about the organization of a guerrilla movement and the illegal methods, such as torture, used by the French to stop it. Despite the country's hardships, Algeria succeeded in gaining independence from the French, which Pontecorvo addresses in the film's epilogue.

The film was met with international acclaim, and it is considered to be one of the greatest films of all time. It won the Golden Lion at the 27th Venice Film Festival among other awards and nominations. It also was nominated for the Academy Award for Best Foreign Language Film. A subject of sociopolitical controversy in France, the film was not screened in the country for five years. Insurgent groups and state authorities have considered it to be an important commentary on urban guerrilla warfare. In Sight and Sound's 2022 poll of the greatest films of all time, it ranked 45th on the critics' list and 22nd on the directors' list. In 2008, the film was included on the Italian Ministry of Cultural Heritage's 100 Italian films to be saved, a list of 100 films that "have changed the collective memory of the country between 1942 and 1978".

== Plot summary ==
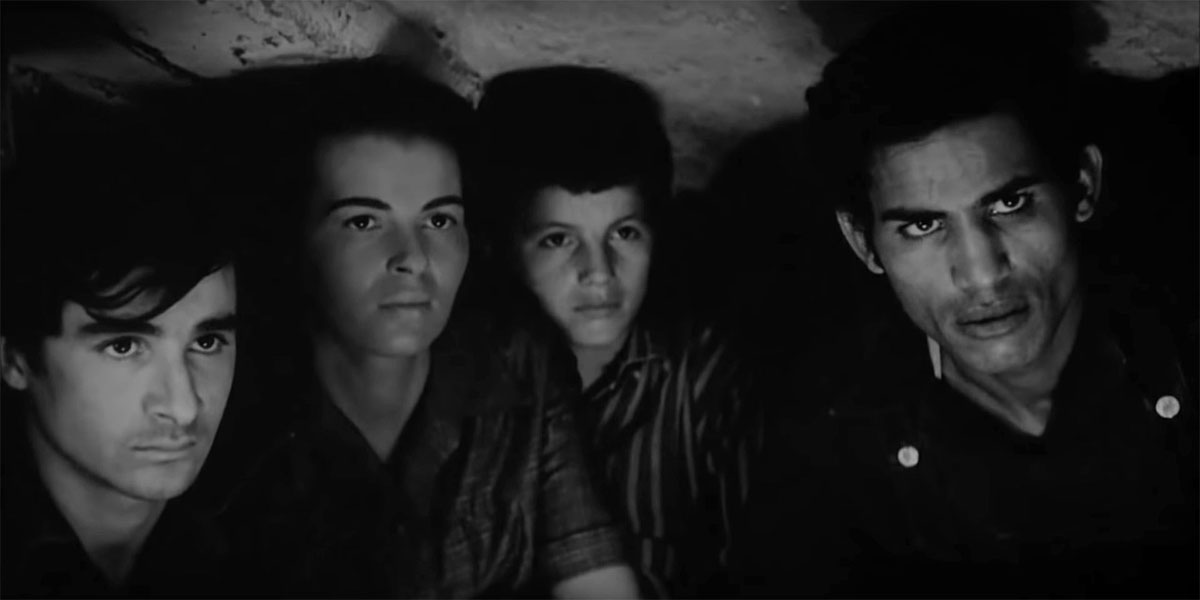
Mahmoud, Hassiba, Little Omar, and Ali La Pointe portrayed in the hideout

The Battle of Algiers opens in 1957 in the capital city of French Algeria. After being tortured, one of Ali la Pointe's (Brahim Hadjadj) compatriots reveals Ali's hideout to the French Army. The Army raids Ali's home and tells him that he is surrounded and the "organization" is finished. The film then flashes back to 1954.

The Battle of Algiers reconstructs the events that occurred in the capital city of French Algeria between November 1954 and December 1957, during the Algerian War of Independence. The narrative begins with the organization of revolutionary cells in the Casbah. Because of partisan warfare between the Algerian locals and pieds-noirs (ethnic Europeans born in Algeria), in which both sides commit acts of increasing violence, France sends French Army paratroopers to the city to fight against and capture members of the National Liberation Front (FLN). The paratroopers are depicted as neutralizing the whole of the FLN leadership through either assassination or capture. The film ends with a coda depicting nationalist demonstrations and riots, suggesting that although France won the Battle of Algiers, it lost the Algerian War.

The tactics of the FLN guerrilla insurgency and the French counter insurgency, and the uglier incidents of the war are depicted. Both colonizer and colonized commit atrocities against civilians. The FLN commandeered the Casbah via summary execution of Algerian criminals and suspected French collaborators; they commit terrorism, including actions like the real-life Milk Bar Café bombing, to harass Europeans. The security forces resort to killings and indiscriminate violence against the opposition. French paratroops are depicted as routinely using torture, intimidation, and murder.

Pontecorvo and Solinas created several protagonists in their screenplay who are based on historical war figures. The story begins and ends from the perspective of Ali La Pointe, a petty criminal who is politically radicalized while in prison. He is recruited by FLN commander El-Hadi Jafar, played by Saadi Yacef, who was a veteran FLN commander.

Lieutenant-Colonel Phillippe Mathieu, the paratroop commander, is the principal French character. Other characters are the boy Little Omar, a street urchin who is an FLN messenger; Larbi Ben M'hidi, a top FLN leader who provides the political rationale for the insurgency; and Djamila, Zohra, and Hassiba, three FLN women urban guerrillas who carry out a terrorist attack. The Battle of Algiers also features thousands of Algerian extras. Pontecorvo intended to have them portray the "Casbah-as-chorus", communicating with chanting, wailing, and physical effect.

== Production and style ==
=== Screenplay ===
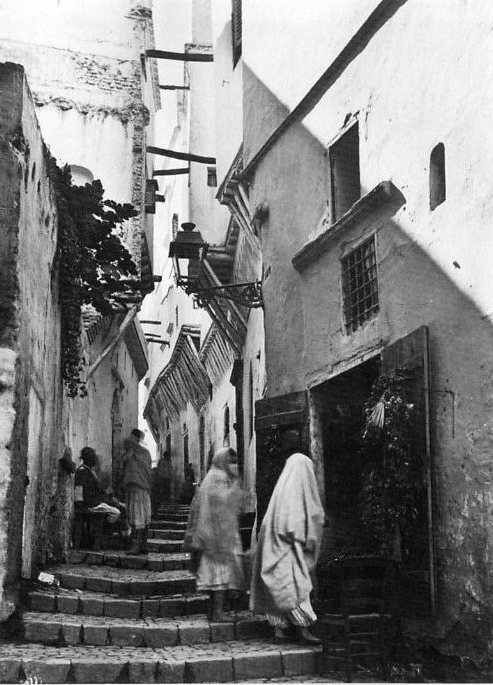
The Casbah, where the film was shot

The Battle of Algiers was inspired by the 1962 book Souvenirs de la Bataille d'Alger, an FLN military commander's account of the campaign, by Saadi Yacef. Yacef wrote the book while he was held as a prisoner of the French, and it served to boost morale for the FLN and other militants. After independence, the French released Yacef, who became a leader in the new government. The Algerian government backed adapting Yacef's memoir as a film. Salash Baazi, an FLN leader who had been exiled by the French, approached Italian director Gillo Pontecorvo and screenwriter Franco Solinas with the project.

To meet the demands of film, The Battle of Algiers uses composite characters and changes the names of certain persons. For example, Colonel Mathieu is a composite of several French counterinsurgency officers, especially Jacques Massu. Yacef has said that Mathieu was based more on Marcel Bigeard, although the character is also reminiscent of Roger Trinquier. Accused of portraying Mathieu as too elegant and noble, screenwriter Solinas denied that this was his intention. He said in an interview that the Colonel is "elegant and cultured, because Western civilization is neither inelegant nor uncultured".

=== Visual style ===
For The Battle of Algiers, Pontecorvo and cinematographer Marcello Gatti filmed in black and white and experimented with various techniques to give the film the look of newsreel and documentary film. The effect was so convincing that American releases carried a notice that "not one foot" of newsreel was used.

Pontecorvo's use of fictional realism enables the movie "to operate along a double-bind as it consciously addresses different audiences." The film makes special use of television in order to link western audiences with images they are constantly faced with that are asserted to express the "truth". The film seems to be filmed through the point of view of a western reporter, as telephoto lenses and hand-held cameras are used, whilst "depicting the struggle from a 'safe' distance with French soldiers placed between the crowds and camera."

=== Cast ===
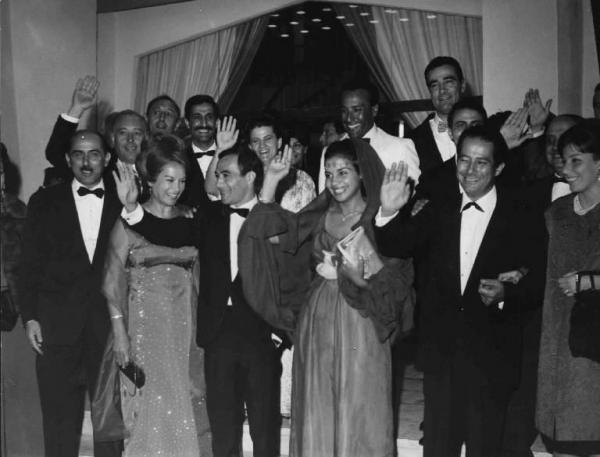
The cast of the movie at the Venice International Film Festival, 1966

Pontecorvo chose to cast non-professional Algerians. He chose people whom he met, picking them mainly on appearance and emotional effect (as a result, many of their lines were dubbed). The sole professional actor of the movie was Jean Martin, who played Colonel Mathieu; Martin was a French actor who had worked primarily in theatre. Pontecorvo wanted a professional actor, but one who would not be familiar to most audiences, as this could have interfered with the movie's intended realism.

Martin had been dismissed several years earlier from the Théâtre National Populaire for signing the manifesto of the 121 against the Algerian War. Martin was a veteran; he had served in a paratroop regiment during the Indochina War and he had taken part in the French Resistance. His portrayal had autobiographical depth. According to an interview with Solinas, the working relationship between Martin and Pontecorvo was not always easy. Unsure whether Martin's professional acting style would contrast too much with the non-professionals, Pontecorvo argued about Martin's acting choices.

Yacef, who plays El-Hadi Jaffar, and Samia Kerbash, who plays Fathia, were both members of the FLN and Pontecorvo is said to have been greatly inspired by their accounts. The actors credited are:

- Jean Martin as Colonel Philippe Mathieu
- Saadi Yacef as El-Hadi Jafar
- Brahim Hadjadj as Ali La Pointe
- Tommaso Neri as Captain Dubois
- Samia Kerbash as Fathia
- Ugo Paletti as a Captain
- Fusia El Kader as Hassiba Ben Bouali
- Franco Moruzzi as Mahmoud
- Mohamed Ben Kassen as Little Omar

=== Sound and music ===
Sound – both music and effects – perform important functions in the movie. Indigenous Algerian drumming, rather than dialogue, is heard during a scene in which female FLN militants prepare for bombings. In addition, Pontecorvo used the sounds of gunfire, helicopters and truck engines to symbolize the French methods of battle, while bomb blasts, ululation, wailing and chanting symbolize the Algerian methods. Pontecorvo wrote the music for The Battle of Algiers, but because he was classified as a "melodist-composer" in Italy, he was required to work with another composer as well; his good friend Ennio Morricone collaborated with him. The solo military drum, which is heard throughout the film, is played by the famous Italian drummer Pierino Munari.

== Release, reception and legacy ==
=== Initial reception ===
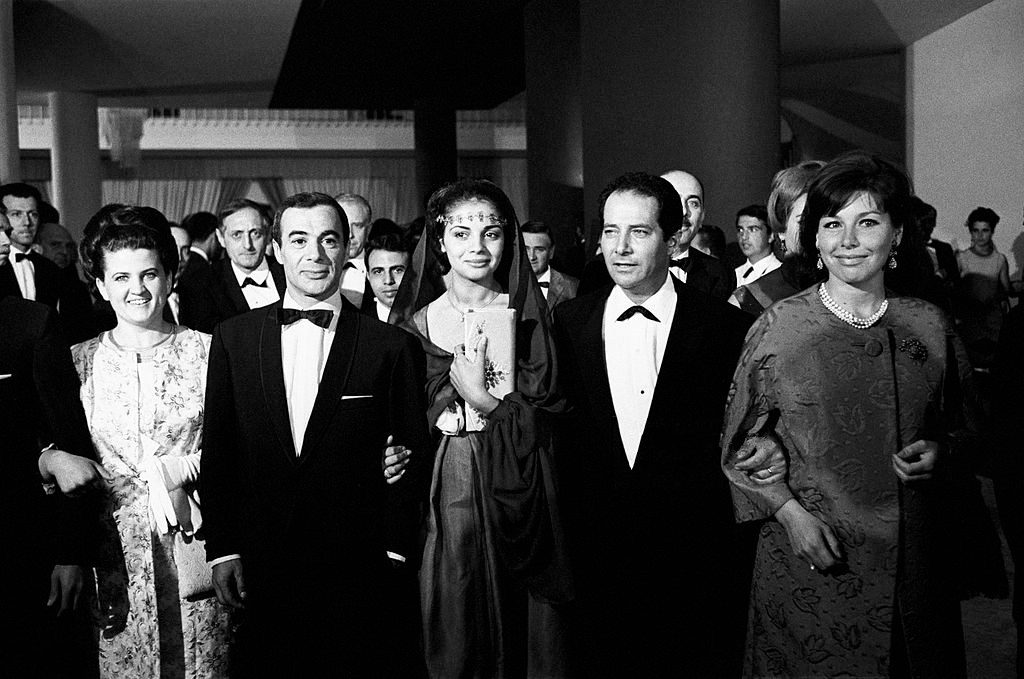
Italian director Gillo Pontecorvo (second from right) with his wife Picci and Algerian actor and co-producer Saadi Yacef posing beside some guests at the 27th Venice Film Festival, in which the movie won the Golden Lion.

The film won the Golden Lion at the Venice Film Festival and was nominated for three Academy Awards (in non-consecutive years, a unique achievement): Best Foreign Language Film in 1966, and Best Screenplay (Gillo Pontecorvo and Franco Solinas) and Best Director (Gillo Pontecorvo) in 1968. Other awards include the City of Venice Cinema Prize (1966), the International Critics Award (1966), the City of Imola Prize (1966), the Italian Silver Ribbon Prize (director, photography, producer), the Ajace Prize of the Cinema d'Essai (1967), the Italian Golden Asphodel (1966), Diosa de Plata at the Acapulco Film Festival (1966), the Golden Grolla (1966), the Riccione Prize (1966), Best Film of 1967 by Cuban critics (in a poll sponsored by Cuban magazine Cine), and the United Churches of America Prize (1967). Given national divisions over the Algerian War, The Battle of Algiers generated considerable political controversy in France. It was one of the first films to directly confront the issue of French imperialism that reached the French Métropole; earlier films like Godard's Le petit soldat had only addressed such matters in passing. Its initial festival screenings sparked nearly unanimous backlash among French critics. At the Venice Film Festival, the delegation of French journalists refused to attend the film's screening and abandoned the festival altogether when it received the Golden Lion. Despite the high international acclaim, the national press and film industry united in opposition to the idea of releasing the film in French cinemas.

The Battle of Algiers was formally banned by the French government for one year, though it did not see release in France for several more years because no private distributor would take the film. Pontecorvo maintained that he had made a politically neutral film, contrary to the reaction of a French government that he described as "very sensitive on the Algerian issue," and he said "The Algerians put no obstacles in our way because they knew that I'd be making a more or less objective film about the subject." In 1970 the film finally received a certificate for distribution in France, but release was further delayed until 1971 because of terroristic threats as well as civil opposition from veterans' groups. The Organisation Armée Secrète (OAS), a far-right paramilitary group, made bomb threats to theaters that sought to show the film. Pontecorvo also received death threats. Upon its release, reviews in the French press were generally much more favourable. Anti-censorship advocates came to the film's defense, and many critics reevaluated the film in light of the country's recent protest movements. Most French audiences found its portrayal of the conflict to be nuanced and balanced, and the only disruption occurred in Lyons when an attendant threw ink at the screen. Also, the international version of the film was shortened with torture scenes cut for British and American theaters.

In the United States, the response to the film was altogether and immediately more positive than it had been in France. The film achieved a surprising degree of popular success at the American box office, stoked by anti-war sentiments amid the movement against military involvement in Vietnam. In a review for the Chicago Sun-Times, Roger Ebert called it a "great film" that "may be a deeper film experience than many audiences can withstand: too cynical, too true, too cruel and too heartbreaking. It is about the Algerian war, but those not interested in Algeria may substitute another war; The Battle of Algiers has a universal frame of reference." Robert Sitton at The Washington Post called the film "One of the most beautiful I have ever seen" and said it "is just as important for our times as the works of Griffith, Leni Riefenstahl, Carl Dreyer and Luchino Visconti were for theirs." Pauline Kael championed the film in The New Yorker, writing: "probably the most emotionally stirring revolutionary epic since Eisenstein's Potemkin" and "The burning passion of Pontecorvo acts directly on your emotions. He is the most dangerous kind of Marxist: a Marxist poet."

=== Retrospective appraisal and influence ===
On review aggregation website Rotten Tomatoes, the film holds an approval rating of 99% based on 96 reviews, with an average rating of 9.50/10. The site's consensus reads: "A documentary-like depiction of a nation's real-life efforts to expel a colonizing force, The Battle of Algiers puts viewers on the front lines with gripping realism." The site ranked it 11th and 12th on their "300 Best Movies of All Time" list in 2024 and 2025, respectively. On Metacritic, the film has a weighted average score of 96 out of 100—indicating "universal acclaim"—based on 22 reviews collected since its 2004 re-release.

By the time of the film's 2004 re-release, French reception was much more positive, with most critics accepting the film's aesthetic merits and historic significance as a given. A review in Libération deemed it the "best film ever made about the Algerian war" because it had been "the most credible and the fairest". A notable dissent came from Cahiers du Cinéma, which devoted a special feature to the film comprising five articles by various authors; the magazine's collective editorial denouncement of the film was "cast in such strong terms that it undermined, on moral grounds, the legitimacy of any critic or analyst who did not condemn the film, let alone anyone who dared consider it worthy of filmic attention," though ultimately their disapproval exerted little influence upon the broader French media.

Roger Ebert added the film to his Great Movies series in 2004. The film occupied the 48th place on the Critics' Top 250 Films of Sight and Sound's 2012 poll of the greatest films of all time, as well as 120th place on Empire magazine's list of the 500 greatest movies of all time. In 2010, Empire ranked the movie 6th in its list of the 100 Best Films of World Cinema. It was selected to enter the list of the "100 Italian films to be saved". In 2007, the film was ranked fifth in The Guardian's readers' poll listing the 40 greatest foreign films of all time.

The Battle of Algiers has influenced numerous filmmakers. The American film director Stanley Kubrick praised the film's artistry in an interview with the French magazine Positif: "All films are, in a sense, false documentaries. One tries to approach reality as much as possible, only it's not reality. There are people who do very clever things, which have completely fascinated and fooled me. For example, The Battle of Algiers. It's very impressive." Also, according to Anthony Frewin, Kubrick's personal assistant, he stated: "When I started work for Stanley in September 1965 he told me that I couldn't really understand what cinema was capable of without seeing The Battle of Algiers. He was still enthusing about it prior to his death." The Greek-French political filmmaker Costa-Gavras cited the film as an influence on his filmmaking. The American filmmaker Steven Soderbergh took inspiration from the film while directing the drug war drama Traffic, noting that it (along with Costa-Gavras's Z) had "that great feeling of things that are caught, instead of staged, which is what we were after." The German filmmaker Werner Herzog admired the film and made it one of the few films designated as required viewing to his film school students. The American filmmaker Kathryn Bigelow named it her favorite movie of all time and praised its unrelenting "metronome of tension".

The film has been cited as an influence on Red Dawn, a 1984 film about a group of American guerrillas resisting a joint Soviet–Latin American invasion, with journalist Andrew Kopkind calling it "the most convincing story about popular resistance to imperial oppression since the inimitable Battle of Algiers". The Mexican filmmaker Alfonso Cuarón used The Battle of Algiers as an influence for the dystopian drama Children of Men (2006) as a model for social reconstruction in preparation for production, presenting the film to actor Clive Owen as an example of his vision for the film: "It's meticulous, and the sense of reality is so unique. I remember, the first time I saw it, I swore they were lying when they said that everything was fictional." The American actor and filmmaker Ben Affleck said The Battle of Algiers was a key influence on his film Argo (2012). The British-American filmmaker Christopher Nolan has named the film as one of his favorites and has credited it as an influence on his films The Dark Knight Rises (2012) and Dunkirk. The Australian filmmaker George Miller named the film as one of his five favorite films. The American filmmaker Jason Hall named the film as one of his five favorite military films. It appears in the action thriller film One Battle After Another, and was cited as an influence by director Paul Thomas Anderson. The film also influenced Andor, with various cinematic parallels including a direct parallel between the Theme of Ali and the song played by the marching band in the first season’s final episode, as they march on a police line.

The film has also received praise from political commentators. The Palestinian-American academic Edward Said (famous for his work Orientalism) praised The Battle of Algiers (along with Pontecorvo's other film, Burn!) as the two films "stand unmatched and unexcelled since they were made in the 60s. Both films together constitute a political and aesthetic standard never again equaled." The British-Pakistani writer and activist Tariq Ali placed The Battle of Algiers in his top 10 films list for the 2012 Sight and Sound poll. In 2023, the progressive American magazine The New Republic ranked it first place on its list of the 100 most significant political films of all time.

=== The Battle of Algiers and guerrilla movements ===
The release of The Battle of Algiers coincided with the decolonization period and national liberation wars, as well as a rising tide of left-wing radicalism in European nations in which a large minority showed interest in armed struggle. Beginning in the late 1960s, The Battle of Algiers gained a reputation for inspiring political violence; in particular, the tactics of urban guerrilla warfare and terrorism in the movie supposedly were copied by the Black Panthers, the Provisional Irish Republican Army, the Palestinian Liberation Organization and the Jammu Kashmir Liberation Front. The Battle of Algiers was apparently West German militant Andreas Baader's favourite movie. Pontecorvo, hearing that the journalist Jimmy Breslin had characterized The Battle of Algiers as a guerrilla warfare training film on American television, replied:

Perhaps he is right, but that is much too simple. The film champions everyone who is deprived of his rights, and encourages him to fight for them. But it is an analogy for many situations: Vietnam, for one. What I would prefer for people to discover is something that is in all my films, a certain kind of tenderness for man, an affection which grows from the fragility of the human condition.

== Later screenings ==
=== Screenings for counterinsurgency agencies ===
==== 1960s screenings in Argentina ====
President Arturo Frondizi (Radical Civic Union, UCR) directed introduction of the first course on counter-revolutionary warfare in the Higher Military College. By 1963, cadets at the Navy Mechanics School (ESMA) started receiving counter-insurgency classes. In one of their courses, they were shown the movie The Battle of Algiers. Antonio Caggiano, archbishop of Buenos Aires from 1959 to 1975, was associated with this as military chaplain. He introduced the movie approvingly and added a religiously oriented commentary to it. ESMA was later known as a center for the Argentine Dirty War and torture and abuse of insurgents and innocent civilians. Anibal Acosta, one of the ESMA cadets interviewed 35 years later by French journalist Marie-Monique Robin, described the session:

They showed us that film to prepare us for a kind of war very different from the regular war we had entered the Navy School for. They were preparing us for police missions against the civilian population, who became our new enemy.

==== 2003 Pentagon screening ====
During 2003, the press reported that United States Department of Defense (the Pentagon) offered a screening of the movie on August 27. The Directorate for Special Operations and Low-Intensity Conflict regarded it as useful for commanders and troops facing similar issues in occupied Iraq. A flyer for the screening said:

How to win a battle against terrorism and lose the war of ideas. Children shoot soldiers at point-blank range. Women plant bombs in cafes. Soon the entire Arab population builds to a mad fervor. Sound familiar? The French have a plan. It succeeds tactically, but fails strategically. To understand why, come to a rare showing of this film.

According to the Defense Department official in charge of the screening, "Showing the film offers historical insight into the conduct of French operations in Algeria, and was intended to prompt informative discussion of the challenges faced by the French."

=== 2003–2004 theatrical re-release ===
At the time of the 2003 Pentagon screening, legal and "pirate" VHS and DVD versions of the movie were available in the United States and elsewhere, but the image quality was degraded. A restored print had been made in Italy in 1999. Rialto Pictures acquired the distribution rights to re-release the film again in the United Kingdom in December 2003 as well as in the United States and in France on separate dates in 2004. The film was shown in the Espace Accattone, rue Cujas in Paris, from November 15, 2006, to March 6, 2007.

== Home media ==
The home media release history of Battle of Algiers is summarized in the following table.

Title	Released	Publisher	Aspect Ratio	Cut	Runtime	Commentaries	Resolution	Master	Medium	Reference(s)
#249	October 19, 2021	The Criterion Collection	1.85:1	2018 restoration	2h 02m	none	2160p	4K	Blu-ray	
Dual Edition	May 2, 2018	Cult Films	1.85:1	2018 restoration	2h 02m	none	1080i/2160p	4K	Blu-ray	
CULT501	July 9, 2012	Cult Films	1.85:1		2h 02m	none	1080i	4K	Blu-ray	
#249	August 9, 2011	The Criterion Collection	1.85:1		2h 02m	none	1080i	2K	Blu-ray	
AGTD011	August 30, 2009	Cult Films	1.85:1		2h 02m	none	480i	2K	DVD	
#249	October 12, 2004	The Criterion Collection	1.85:1		2h 01m	none	480i	2K	DVD	
#9322225034198	2004	Madman Entertainment	1.33:1		1h 57m	none	576 lines	PAL	DVD	
TVT 1085	February 19, 2001	Palisades Tartan Video	1.33:1		1h 57m	none	576 lines	PAL	VHS	
EE1043	1993	Encore Entertainment	1.66:1		2h 0m	none	425 lines	PAL	LaserDisc	
RNVD 2108	1993	Rhino Home Video	1.33:1			none	240 lines	NTSC	VHS	
	January 9, 1990	Foothill Home Video	1.33:1		2h 01m	none	240 lines	NTSC	VHS	
AVC #0208	1988	Axon Video	1.33:1		2h 5m	none	240 lines	NTSC	VHS	
ID6786X	1985	Axon Video	1.33:1		2h 02m	none	425 lines	NTSC	LaserDisc	
CVL1002	October 1983	Capstan Video	1.33:1			none	240 lines	NTSC	VHS	

=== Special editions ===
==== 2004 Criterion DVD edition ====
On October 12, 2004, The Criterion Collection released the movie, transferred from a restored print, in a three-disc DVD set. The extras include former US counter-terrorism advisors Richard A. Clarke and Michael A. Sheehan discussing The Battle of Algiers' depiction of terrorism and guerrilla warfare. Directors Spike Lee, Mira Nair, Julian Schnabel, Steven Soderbergh, and Oliver Stone discussed its influence on film. Another documentary in the set includes interviews with FLN commanders Saadi Yacef and Zohra Drif.

== See also ==
- Jamila, the Algerian, a commercial film on the same topic released in 1958.
- Lost Command, a commercial film on the same topic released the same year.
- Chronicle of the Years of Fire, a 1975 Algerian drama historical film directed by Mohammed Lakhdar-Hamina. It depicts the Algerian War of Independence as seen through the eyes of a peasant.
- Lion of the Desert, a similar movie about Omar al-Mukhtar's Libyan resistance against Italian occupation.
- List of submissions to the 39th Academy Awards for Best Foreign Language Film
- List of Italian submissions for the Academy Award for Best Foreign Language Film
