= Le Doigt dans l'engrenage =

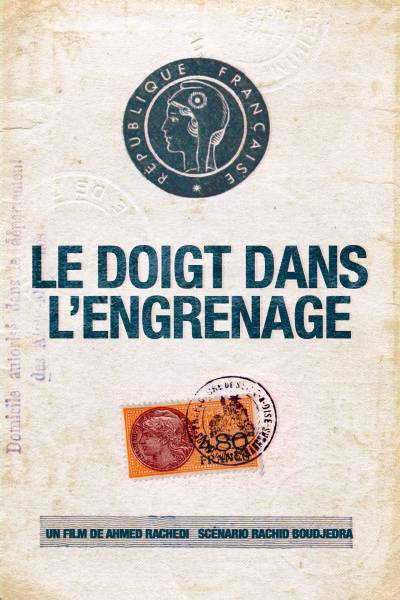
- Poster of the film The Finger in the Gear
- Le Doigt dans l'engrenage
- Directed by: Ahmed Rachedi
- Written by: Rachid Boudjedra
- Starring: Brahim Hadjadj
- Release date: 1974
- Running time: 90 minutes
- Countries: Algeria; France
- Language: French

Le Doigt dans l'engrenage (The Finger in the Gear)is an Algerian film directed by Ahmed Rachedi in 1974, from a screenplay by Rachid Boudjedra. The film was shot in France. Through archival footage and interviews, the film retraces the journey of an Algerian activist living in Paris.

== Synopsis ==
The film follows the arrival of an Algerian immigrant worker who gets lost in the Paris metro. The narrative blends fiction and archival footage to reflect the contrasts and living conditions of immigrants in France.

== Technical details ==
- Title: Le Doigt dans l'engrenage
- Director: Ahmed Rachedi
- Screenplay: Rachid Boudjedra
- Country: Algeria (filmed in France)
- Year: 1974
- Running time: 90 minutes

== Cast ==
- Brahim Hadjadj

== Production and development ==
The film was directed by Ahmed Rachedi from a screenplay written by novelist and screenwriter Rachid Boudjedra. It is a hybrid work combining fiction and documentary elements, centered on the experience of Algerian migrant workers in Europe.

== Themes ==
The film addresses immigration, urban isolation, and the working-class condition of immigrant laborers, combining fiction with documentary materials such as testimonies and archival footage. It is part of a 1970s Algerian and Maghrebi cinematic movement that merged political reflection with a documentary aesthetic.

== See also ==
- List of Algerian films
- Rachid Boudjedra
