= Die Windrose =

1957 East German film by Alberto Cavalcanti

- Directed by: Alberto Cavalcanti; Sergey Gerasimov; Yannick Bellon; Gillo Pontecorvo; Alex Viany; Wu Kuo-yin
- Written by: Jorge Amado; Alberto Cavalcanti; Vladimir Pozner; Franco Solinas; José Hipolito; Trigueirinho Neto
- Produced by: Mário Audrá; Joris Ivens
- Starring: Simone Signoret; Yves Montand
- Cinematography: H.E. Fowle
- Music by: Wolfgang Hohensee; Enrico Simonetti
- Production companies: Cinematográfica Maristela; DEFA
- Release date: 8 March 1957 (East Germany)
- Running time: 104 minutes
- Country: German Democratic Republic
- Language: German

Die Windrose (The Windrose) was a film made for the East German production company DEFA in 1957 and commissioned by the Women's International Democratic Federation. Alberto Cavalcanti was film director, with artistic input from Joris Ivens, Simone Signoret, Yves Montand and Helene Weigel, wife of German dramatist Bertold Brecht. All collaborated in the making of this film, a docu-drama about the struggle of female workers in Italy, Brazil, the Soviet Union, China and France, united as "pioneers of the way which leads to a better future".

== Cast ==
- Angela Brunner ... (voice)
- Aracy Cardoso
- Valdo César
- Marlene França
- Armida Gianassi ... Giovanna
- Yves Montand
- Vanja Orico
- Carla Pozzi
- Simone Signoret
- Aurélio Teixeira
- Miguel Torres
- Helene Weigel
- Yen Mei-yi
- Zinaida Kirienko
