= Les Mains libres (1964 film) =

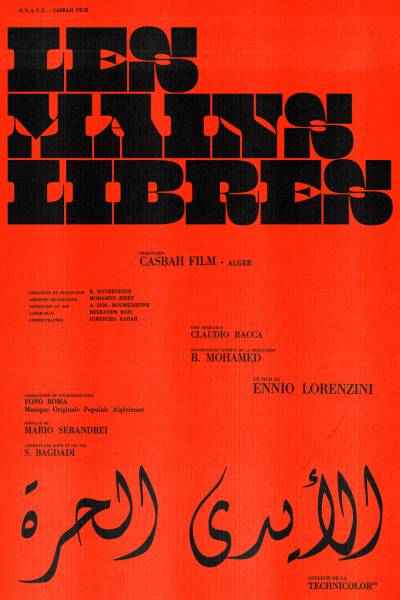
- Poster
- الأيدي الحرة
- Directed by: Ennio Lorenzini
- Written by: Ennio Lorenzini (documentary)
- Produced by: Casbah Films (studio)
- Release date: 1965 (Algeria)
- Running time: 60 minutes
- Country: Algeria
- Language: French / Arabic

Les Mains libres (in Arabic: الأيدي الحرة) is an Algerian documentary film directed by the Italian filmmaker Ennio Lorenzini and produced by Casbah Films. Filmed during the winter of 1964, it is considered one of the first major cinematic productions of independent Algeria. The documentary's themes are: Sea and Desert, Struggle, Land and Freedom.

== Synopsis ==
The film is composed of several segments dedicated to the landscapes, struggles, and social transformations in post-independence Algeria. It combines testimonies, images of the territory (sea, desert, countryside), and sequences highlighting the traces of colonization and the national reconstruction.

== Technical details ==
- Director: Ennio Lorenzini
- Production: Casbah Films.
- Country of origin: Algeria
- Year: 1964–1965 (shot in 1964, previewed and released in 1965)
- Runtime: varies depending on sources (estimated around 60 minutes)

== Context and production ==
The film was directed by Ennio Lorenzini at a time when the newly independent Algeria sought to establish a national film industry. It is often cited as the “first major production” of the post-independence period, made in collaboration with local crews (Casbah Films) and technicians such as Yacef Saâdi, who contributed to production and coordination.

== Distribution and reception ==
The film was screened at festivals and public showings at the time. It was mentioned in the international press as an example of Third World cinema and as one of the first documentary representations of independent Algeria. Recently, restored versions and retrospectives have been presented (notably at Il cinema ritrovato / Cineteca di Bologna and other festivals and cinematheques).

== Preservation and current status ==
According to several research sources and archival records, the film suffered from preservation issues and complete copies have been difficult to locate. Fragments of the film have been found in international archives (AAMOD, cinematheques), and partial restored versions have been screened at recent festivals. The cooperation between Algerian archives (Casbah Films, national archives) and European institutions has made it possible to recover and screen some elements between 2022 and 2023.

== Crew and related figures ==
- Director: Ennio Lorenzini.
- Voices / participants / witnesses: Si Mohamed Baghdadi (voice-over / narrator mentioned in certain records).
- Technicians / collaborators: local participation (Casbah Films staff, Algerian assistants such as Mohamed Zinet, mentioned in historical records)

== Bibliography ==
- Luca Peretti and others — studies and essays on Italian cinema and its connections with independent Algeria (see academic works citing Les Mains Libres)
