= The Wide Blue Road =

- A poster with the film's English title: The Wide Blue Road
- Directed by: Gillo Pontecorvo
- Written by: Ennio De Concini; Gillo Pontecorvo; Maleno Malenotti
- Story by: Franco Solinas
- Produced by: Maleno Malenotti
- Starring: Yves Montand; Alida Valli
- Cinematography: Mario Montuori
- Edited by: Eraldo Da Roma
- Music by: Carlo Franci
- Distributed by: G.E.S.I. Cinematografica
- Release date: 22 November 1957
- Running time: 103 minutes
- Countries: France; Italy; West Germany; Yugoslavia
- Language: Italian

The Wide Blue Road (Italian: La grande strada azzurra) is a 1957 Italian romance drama film directed by Gillo Pontecorvo.

== Plot ==
The story follows the harsh rugged life of a poor fisherman on La Maddalena. In a desperate effort to improve the lives of his family he begins to fish illegally using bombs instead of relying on nets. However this method invokes the hatred of the other fishermen.

== Cast ==
- Alida Valli – Rosetta
- Yves Montand – Squarciò
- Francisco Rabal – Salvatore
- Umberto Spadaro – Marshal
- Peter Carsten – Rivo
- Federica Ranchi – Diana
- Terence Hill – Renato

== Reception ==
On the review aggregator website Rotten Tomatoes, 92% of 13 critics' reviews are positive. Metacritic, which uses a weighted average, assigned the film a score of 76 out of 100, based on 13 critics, indicating "universal acclaim".
