= Raymonde Peschard =

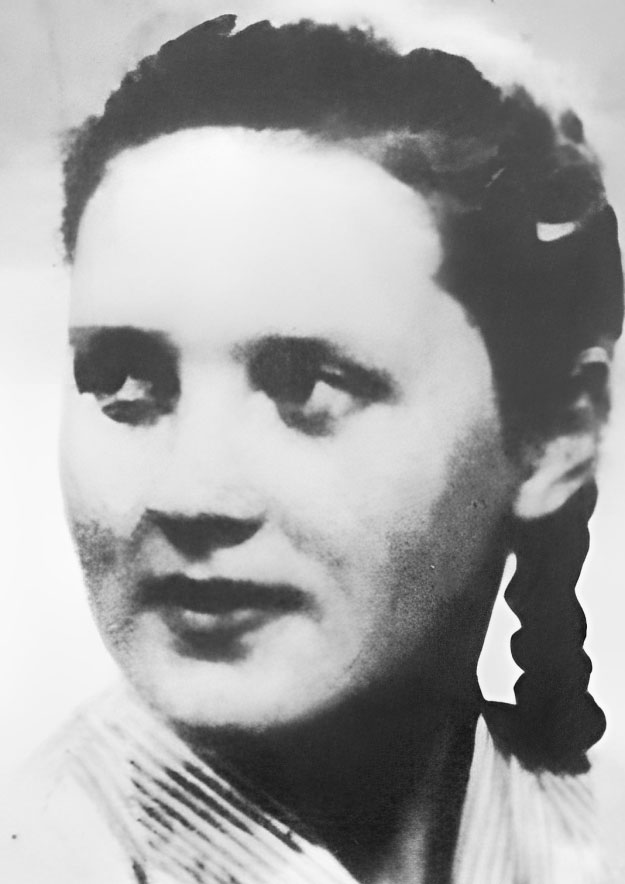
- Born: Raymonde Peschard; September 15, 1927; Bologhine, Algeria
- Died: 26 November 1957 (aged 30)
- Organization: Armée de Libération Nationale (ALN)
- Movement: Front de Libération Nationale (FLN)

Raymonde Peschard (15 September 1927 – 26 November 1957) was an Algerian social worker and freedom fighter during the Algerian War of Independence. She was first a member of the Algerian Communist Party but joined the National Liberation Army after she was incorrectly accused of planning the Milk Bar Café bombing with Zohra Drif. While a member of the ALN, she adopted the codename "الطاووس," meaning peacock in Arabic.

== Biography ==
Peschard was born on 15 September 1927 in Bologhine, French Algeria. Her father worked as a station master. During the 1950s, Peschard joined the Algerian Communist Party; when the French government cracked down on communist activity in Algeria, she was exiled from Constantine. In 1956, Peschard was incorrectly accused of being an accomplice to the Milk Bar Café bombing and was forced to flee from the colonial authorities. As such, Peschard joined the Front de Libération Nationale, going on to participate in several missions the group launched against the colonial government. Peschard continued her activities, joining the more militant National Liberation Army in 1957. While operating with the ALN, she operated under the code-name "الطاووس"—"Peacock" in Arabic—serving as a nurse for the rebels.

On 26 November 1957, Peschard and 10 other rebels were killed by the French army near the town of Medjana. Following the end of the Algerian War for Independence, Peschard was declared a martyr of the conflict. According to Jean-Luc Einaudi, she was the only Algerian of European descent to be named as a martyr of the conflict.
