= Marcello Gatti =

Italian cinematographer (1924-2013)

Marcello Gatti (9 February 1924 – 26 November 2013) was an Italian cinematographer.

Born in Rome, Gatti started as a film operator in the early 1940s, then debuted as a cinematographer in 1953. In 1943, he was sentenced to five years in prison, then turned into exile, for having defaced a portrait of Benito Mussolini hung on the walls of Cinecittà.

He is probably best known for his collaboration with director Gillo Pontecorvo, especially for the experimental cinematography of The Battle of Algiers, which was inspired by the cinéma vérité theory. He won five Silver Ribbon for Best Cinematography. He also worked, among others, with Roman Polanski, Nanni Loy, Damiano Damiani, Eriprando Visconti, Luigi Zampa, George P. Cosmatos and Sergio Corbucci. Gatti has long been the president of the Italian Association of Cinematographers (Aic).
