= The Stranger (1967 film) =

1967 film directed by Luchino Visconti

- Directed by: Luchino Visconti
- Screenplay by: Luchino Visconti; Suso Cecchi d'Amico
- Based on: The Stranger; 1942 novel by Albert Camus
- Produced by: Dino De Laurentiis
- Starring: Marcello Mastroianni; Anna Karina; Bernard Blier; Jacques Herlin; Georges Géret; Georges Wilson
- Cinematography: Giuseppe Rotunno
- Music by: Piero Piccioni
- Production company: Dino de Laurentiis Cinematografica
- Distributed by: Paramount Pictures
- Release date: 14 October 1967
- Running time: 104 minutes
- Country: Italy
- Language: French/Italian

The Stranger (Italian: Lo straniero) is a 1967 Italian film directed by Luchino Visconti, based on Albert Camus's 1942 novel The Stranger, with Marcello Mastroianni.

== Plot ==
Arthur Meursault's friend Raymond beats his girlfriend and is sued by her. In court, Meursault testifies to his friend's advantage. Raymond is off the hook, but now his girlfriend's male relatives stalk Meursault. He shoots one of them and ends up in prison.

== Cast ==
- Marcello Mastroianni as Arthur Meursault
- Anna Karina as Marie Cardona
- Bernard Blier as the Defense counsel
- Georges Wilson as the Examining magistrate
- Bruno Cremer as Priest
- Pierre Bertin as the judge
- Jacques Herlin as the Director of the rest home
- Marc Laurent as Emmanuel
- Georges Géret as Raymond
- Brahim Haggiag as the Arab
- Alfred Adam as the prosecutor
- Jean-Pierre Zola as the employer
- Mimmo Palmara as Monsieur Masson
- Angela Luce as Madame Masson
- Larry J. McDonald as the bearded man at the port

== Production ==
Alain Delon originally was announced for the lead.
