= Djamila Bouazza =

Algerian independence activist

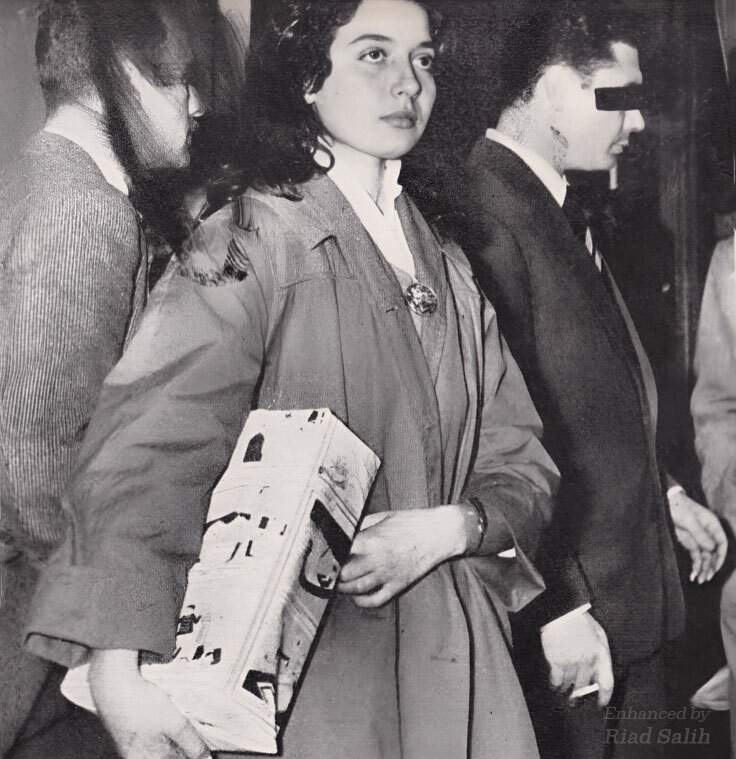
- Born: 1938
- Died: 12 June 2015 (aged 76–77); Algiers, Algeria
- Occupation: Militant
- Known for: Planting a bomb in the Coq Hardi café in Algiers (1957)
- Movement: Algerian nationalism, FLN

Djamila Bouazza (Arabic: جميلة بوعزة; 1938 – 12 June 2015), also spelled Jamila Bouaza, was an Algerian militant who supported Algerian nationalism, opposing French colonial rule. She is remembered for planting a bomb in April 1957 on the terrace of the Coq Hardi café in Algiers, killing four people and injuring many more. She was initially sentenced to death by a French military court but was finally released in 1962 under the Évian Accords.

== Biography ==
During the Algerian War, Bouazza worked at the Postal Cheque Centre in Algiers where, fully integrated into the French colonial regime, she was known by her French-Algerian colleagues as Miss Cha Cha Cha. Recruited by Djamila Bouhired, she became an active member of the FLN whose objective was Algerian independence.

=== Coq Hardi incident ===
On 26 January 1957, Bouazza was instructed to plant a bomb in the Coq Hardi bar, a popular venue for the affluent French Algerians. She managed to escape the attention of the guards and leave the bomb inside. The explosion caused four deaths while some sixty were injured. Regarded as a heroine by the Algerians, she was arrested as a terrorist by the French.

Bouazza was arrested on 25 April and admitted she had planted the bomb. After being interrogated, she was interned at the prison in Maison-Carée, together with the activists Djamila Bouhired, Jacqueline Guerroudj and Zohra Drif. At the trial in mid-July 1957, Bouazza and Bouhired were both sentenced to death. Bouazza expressed her sorrow for the bomb victims while Bouhired confirmed her nationalism.

After spending several years in prison, Bouazza was finally released in 1962 following the Évian accords. She died in Algiers on 12 June 2015, aged 78.
