= Hassiba Ben Bouali =

Algerian independence leader and fighter (1938–1957)

Hassiba Ben Bouali حسيبة بن بوعلي
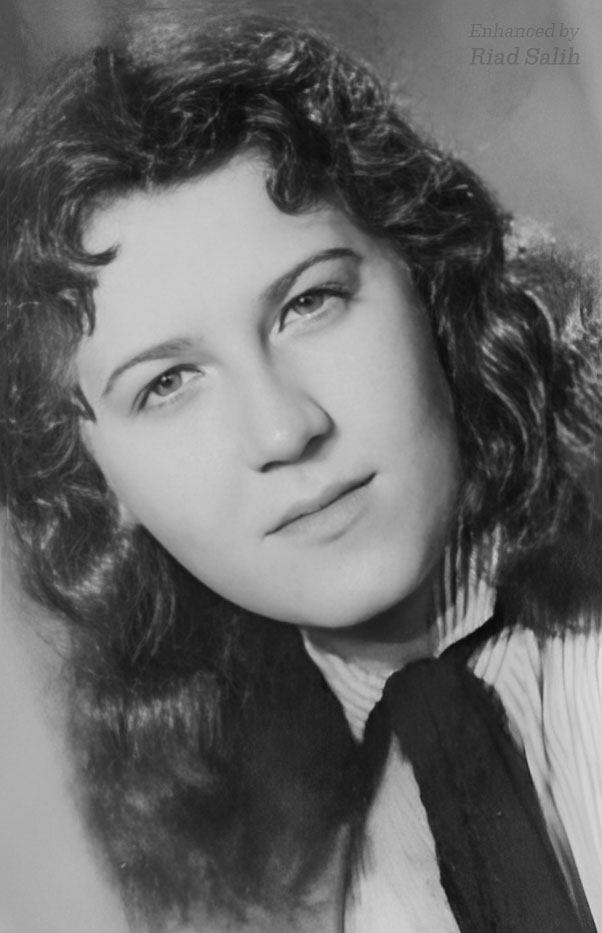
- Bouali in 1955
- Born: Hassiba Ben Bouali; 18 January 1938; El-Asnam (Chlef), Algeria
- Died: 9 October 1957 (aged 19); Casbah, Algiers, Algeria
- Cause of death: Killed in action
- Education: University of Algiers
- Organization: Armée de Libération Nationale (ALN)
- Known for: Battle of Algiers
- Movement: Front de Libération Nationale (FLN)

Hassiba Ben Bouali (Arabic: حسيبة بن بوعلي) (18 January 1938 – 9 October 1957) was an Algerian militant and revolutionary figure of the Algerian War.

== Biography ==
Hassiba Ben Bouali was born in El-Asnam (Today, Chlef), Algeria, into an aristocratic family.

Her parents moved to Algiers in 1947, where she studied at the Lycée Delacroix (high-school). She joined the Scout Movement, and her travels made her aware of the conditions of the Algerian people under the colonial government. This motivated her to join the Union générale des étudiants musulmans algériens (General Union of Algerian Muslim Students) in 1954, at the age of 16. She participated in the nationalist struggle until her death. In the 1957 Battle of Algiers, she and three companions including Ali Ammar (aka Ali La Pointe) were killed when French forces bombed their hideout in the Casbah.

Benbouali was depicted in the movie The Battle of Algiers by actress Fusia El Kader. One of the largest avenues in Algiers and the university of Chlef were named after her.
