= Gillo Pontecorvo =

Italian film director (1919–2006)

Gillo Pontecorvo OMRI
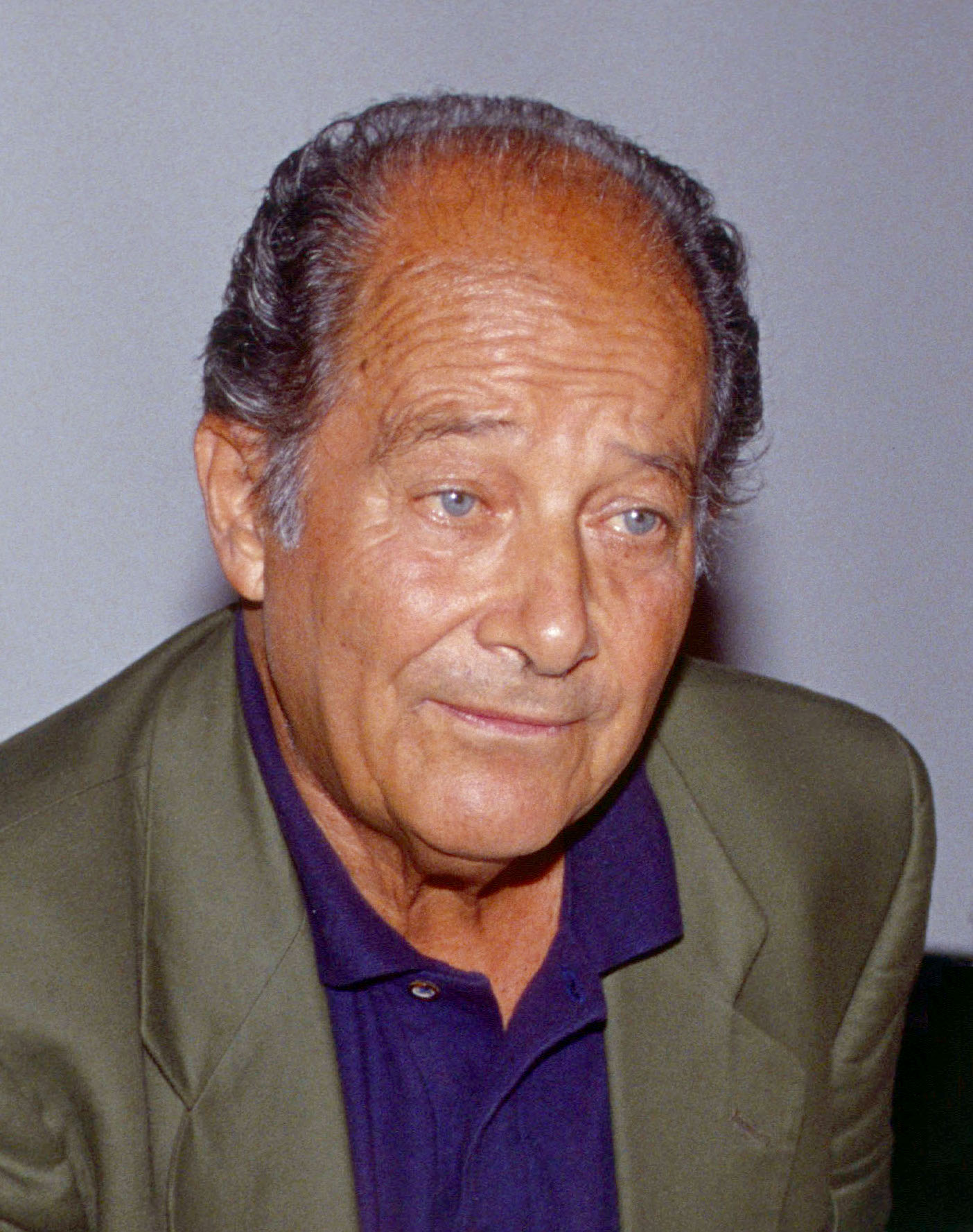
- Born: Gilberto Pontecorvo; 19 November 1919; Pisa, Italy
- Died: 12 October 2006 (aged 86); Rome, Italy
- Occupations: Film director, screenwriter, composer
- Years active: 1953–2003
- Notable work: The Battle of Algiers; Kapò; Burn!; Ogro
- Spouse: Maria Adele "Picci" Ziino (m. 1964)
- Children: Marco Pontecorvo
- Relatives: Bruno Pontecorvo (brother); Guido Pontecorvo (brother)

Gilberto Pontecorvo (Italian: [ˈdʒillo ponteˈkɔrvo]; 19 November 1919 – 12 October 2006) was an Italian filmmaker associated with the political cinema movement of the 1960s and '70s. He is best known for directing the landmark war docudrama The Battle of Algiers (1966). It won the Golden Lion at the 27th Venice Film Festival, and earned him Oscar nominations for Best Director and Best Original Screenplay.

His other films include Kapò (1960), a Holocaust drama; Burn! (1969), a period film about a fictional slave revolt in the Lesser Antilles; and Ogro (1979), a dramatization of the assassination of Spanish Prime Minister Luis Carrero Blanco by Basque separatists. He also directed several documentaries and short films.

In 2000, he received the Pietro Bianchi Award at the Venice Film Festival. The same year, he was ascended as a Knight's Grand Cross of the Order of Merit of the Italian Republic.

== Early life ==
Pontecorvo, born in Pisa, was the son of a wealthy secular Italian Jewish family. His father was a businessman. Gillo's siblings included brothers Bruno Pontecorvo, later an internationally acclaimed nuclear physicist and one of the so-called Via Panisperna boys, who defected to the Soviet Union in 1950; Guido Pontecorvo, a geneticist who settled in Britain; Paolo [Poli] Pontecorvo, an engineer who worked on radar after World War II; and Giovanni. Their sisters were Giuliana (m. Talbet); Laura (m. Coppa); and Anna (m. Newton).

Pontecorvo studied chemistry at the University of Pisa, but dropped out after passing just two exams. There he first became aware of opposition political forces, and first encountered leftist students and professors. In 1938, faced with growing antisemitism in Italy with the rise of Fascists, he followed his elder brother Bruno to Paris, where he found work in journalism and as a tennis instructor.

In Paris, Pontecorvo became involved in the film world, and began by making a few short documentaries. He became an assistant to Joris Ivens, a Dutch documentary filmmaker and well-known Marxist, whose films include Regen and The Bridge. He also assisted Yves Allégret, a French director known for his work in the film noir genre, whose films include Une si jolie petite plage and Les Orgueilleux. In addition to these influences, Pontecorvo began meeting people who broadened his perspectives, among them artist Pablo Picasso, composer Igor Stravinsky and political thinker Jean-Paul Sartre. During this time Pontecorvo developed his political ideals. He was moved when many of his friends in Paris packed up to go and fight on the Republican side in the Spanish Civil War.

In 1941, Pontecorvo joined the Italian Communist Party. He traveled to northern Italy to help organize Anti-Fascist partisans. Going by the pseudonym Barnaba, he became a leader of the Resistance in Milan from 1943 until 1945.

After the war, he coedited the weekly communist magazine, Pattuglia, with Dario Volari between 1948 and 1950. Pontecorvo broke ties with the Communist party in 1956 after the Soviet intervention to suppress the Hungarian uprising. He did not, however, renounce his dedication to Marxism.

In a 1983 interview with The Guardian, Pontecorvo said, "I am not an out-and-out revolutionary. I am merely a man of the Left, like a lot of Italian Jews."

== Film career ==
=== Early films ===
After the Second World War and his return to Italy, Pontecorvo decided to leave journalism for filmmaking, a shift that appears to have been developing for some time. The catalyst was his seeing Roberto Rossellini's Paisà (1946). He bought a 16mm camera and shot several documentaries, mostly self-funded, beginning with Missione Timiriazev in 1953. He directed Giovanna, which was one episode of La rosa dei venti (1957), a film made of episodes by several directors.

In 1957, he directed his first full-length film, La grande strada azzurra (The Wide Blue Road), which foreshadowed his mature style of later films. It explores the life of a fisherman and his family on a small island off the coast of Sardinia. Because of the scarcity of fish in nearby waters, the fisherman, Squarciò, has to sail out to the open sea, where he fishes illegally with bombs. The film won a prize at the Karlovy Vary International Film Festival. Pontecorvo spent months, and sometimes years, researching the material for his films in order to accurately represent the social situations he explored.

In the next two years, Pontecorvo directed Kapò (1960), a drama set in a Nazi death camp. The plot of the film is about an escape attempt from a concentration camp by a young Jewish girl. In 1961 it was the Italian candidate for the United States' Academy Awards, and it was nominated for an Oscar for Best Foreign-Language Film. In this same year, the film won two awards: the Italian National Syndicate of Film Journalists awarded Didi Perego a Silver Ribbon for best supporting actress, and the Mar del Plata Film Festival awarded Susan Strasberg for best actress.

=== The Battle of Algiers ===
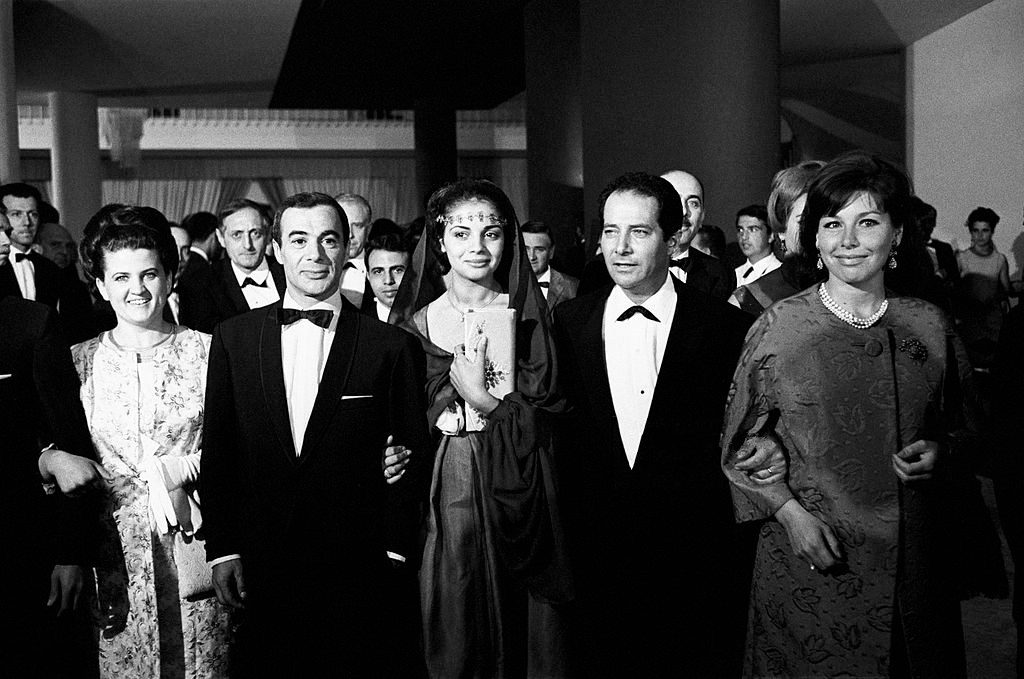
Gillo Pontecorvo with his wife Picci and Saadi Yacef posing beside some guests at 27th Venice International Film Festival

Pontecorvo is best known for his 1966 masterpiece The Battle of Algiers (released in Italian as La battaglia di Algeri). It is widely viewed as one of the finest films of its genre: a neorealistic film. Its portrayal of the Algerian resistance during the Algerian War uses the neorealist style pioneered by fellow Italian film directors de Santis and Rossellini. He used newsreel-style footage and non-professional actors.

He focused primarily on the native Algerians, a disenfranchised population who were seldom featured in the general media. Though very much Italian neorealist in style, Pontecorvo co-produced with an Algerian film company. The script was written with intention that Front de Libération Nationale (FLN) leaders would act in it. (For example, the character Djafar was played by an FLN leader, Yacef Saadi.) Pontecorvo's theme was clearly anti-imperialist. He later described the film as a "hymn ... in homage to the people who must struggle for their independence, not only in Algeria, but everywhere in the third world" and said, "the birth of a nation happens with pain on both sides, although one side has cause and the other not."

The Battle of Algiers achieved great success and influence. It was widely screened in the United States, where Pontecorvo received a number of awards. He was nominated for two Academy Awards for direction and screenplay (a collaboration). The film has been used as a training video by revolutionary groups, as well as by military dictatorships dealing with guerrilla resistance (especially in the 1970s during Operation Condor). It has been and remains extremely popular in Algeria, providing a popular memory of the struggle for independence from France.

The semi-documentary style and use of an almost entirely non-professional cast (only one trained actor appears in the film) was a great influence on a number of future filmmakers and films. Its influence can be seen in the few surviving works of West German filmmaker Teod Richter, made from the late 1960s up to his disappearance, and presumed death, in 1986. In addition, more recent commercial American films, such as the Blair Witch Project, Paranormal Activity and others draw from these techniques for less lofty purposes.

=== Late career ===
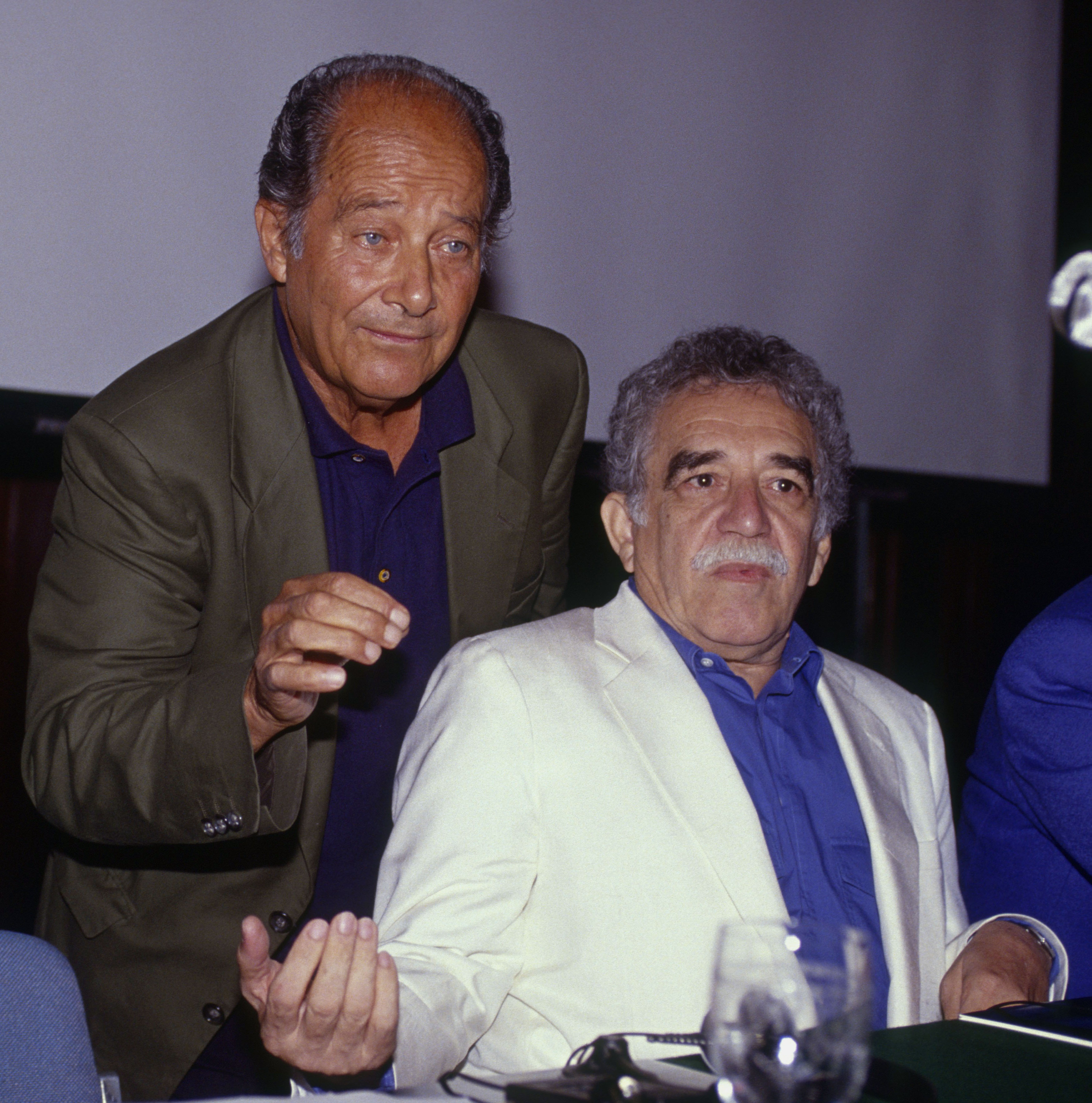
Pontecorvo with Gabriel García Márquez

Pontecorvo's next major work, Queimada! (Burn!, 1969), deals with a fictional slave revolt, set in the Lesser Antilles. This film (starring Marlon Brando) depicts an attempted revolution in a fictional Portuguese colony.

Pontecorvo continued his series of highly political films with Ogro (1979), which addresses the occurrence of Basque terrorism at the end of Francisco Franco's dwindling dictatorship in Spain. He continued making short films into the early 1990s. He also directed a follow-up documentary to The Battle of Algiers, entitled Ritorno ad Algeri (Return to Algiers, 1992).

In 1992, Pontecorvo was selected to replace Guglielmo Biraghi as the director of the Venice Film Festival; he was responsible for the festivals of 1992, 1993 and 1994. In 1991, he was a member of the jury at the 41st Berlin International Film Festival.

In an interview that Pontecorvo gave in 1991, when asked why he had directed so few feature films, his response was that he could only make one with which he is totally in love. He also said that he had rejected many other film concepts for lack of interest.

== Death ==
In 2006, Pontecorvo died from congestive heart failure in Rome at age 86.

== Filmography ==
=== Feature films ===
Title	Year	Functioned as			Notes
Title	Year	Director	Writer	Composer	Notes
The Wide Blue Road (La grande strada azzurra)	1957	Yes	Yes	No	Nominated - Crystal Globe (Karlovy Vary International Film Festival)
Kapo (Kapò)	1960	Yes	Yes	Yes	Nominated - Great Jury Prize (Mar del Plata International Film Festival)
The Battle of Algiers (La Battaglia di Algeri)	1966	Yes	Yes	Yes	Golden Lion (Venice Film Festival); Nastro d'Argento for Best Director; Nominated - Academy Award for Best Director; Nominated - Academy Award for Best Original Screenplay; Nominated - Nastro d'Argento for Best Score
Burn! (Queimada)	1969	Yes	Story	No	David di Donatello for Best Director
Ogro (Operación Ogro)	1979	Yes	Yes	No	David di Donatello for Best Director

=== Documentary films ===
Title	Year	Functioned as			Notes
Title	Year	Director	Writer	Composer	Notes
Missione Timiriazev	1953	Yes	No	No	
Porta Portese	1954	Yes	No	No	
Festa a Castelluccio	1954	Yes	No	No	
Uomini del marmo	1955	Yes	No	No	
Cani dietro le sbarre	1955	Yes	No	No	
Pane e zolfo	1959	Yes	No	No	
Gli uomini del lago	1959	Yes	No	No	
Paras	1963	Yes	No	No	
Addio a Enrico Berliguer	1984	Yes	No	No	
Un altro mondo è possibile	2001	Yes	No	No	
Firenze, il nostro domani	2003	Yes	No	No	

=== Short films ===
- Giovanna (1957, segment of Die Windrose)
- Udine (1984, segment of 12 registi per 12 città)
- Gillo Pontecorvo's Return to Algiers (1992)
- Danza della fata confetto (1996)
- Nostalgia di protezione (1997)

== Tribute ==
In 2026, from 21st edition of Rome Film Festival an award in memory of Gillo Pontecorvo on the twentieth anniversary of his death was established. It was presented by his son Marco Pontecorvo to Emmanuel Marre's A Man of His Time, the first recipient of the award.
