= Palestro ambush =

1956 military operation in the Algerian War

- Part of Algerian War
- Location of the ambush
| Date | 18 May 1956 |
| Location | Lakhdaria, Kabylie, French Algeria |
| Result | FLN victory: French unit destroyed |
| Territorial changes | FLN temporarily controls Djerrah |

Belligerents
| FLN | (France) French Republic |

Commanders and leaders
| Ali Khodja | (France) Hervé Artur † |

Strength
| 40 men | 21 marines |

Casualties and losses
| Unknown; Estimated 1 killed | 17 killed 3 prisoners killed 1 prisoner released Total: 20 killed 1 wounded |

The Palestro ambush, or Djerrah ambush, took place on 18 May 1956, during the Algerian War, near the village of Djerrah in the region of Palestro (now Lakhdaria) in Kabylie. A section of about forty men from the National Liberation Army (ALN) under the command of Lieutenant Ali Khodja ambushed a unit of 21 men from the 9th Colonial Infantry Regiment of the French Army commanded by Second Lieutenant Hervé Artur.

The ambush led to the complete destruction of the small unit of French marines, with a total of 20 French soldiers killed, including their commander, Hervé Artur. One French soldier was taken prisoner and later released. Algerian losses are unknown, but thought to number around one killed and a few wounded.

== Historical context ==
After 1 November 1954, Algeria was at war. As the armed insurgency led by the National Liberation Front (FLN) grew in size, the French army's numbers fell, because Moroccan troops were returning to their now-independent country, a drop in effective strength of the units, and increasing numbers of desertions of Algerian spahis and tirailleurs. President of the Council Guy Mollet recalled available reservists to increase the military strength in Algeria to 200,000 soldiers. Recently elected to ensure "peace in North Africa," he nevertheless implemented a repressive policy and refused to negotiate on independence until a ceasefire was reached. It was also the first time a socialist government, supported by the Communists, decided to send in the army. In May 1956, the first recalled reservists landed in Algeria.

The FLN, for its part, organized in September 1955, very shortly after the events of Constantine, one of its first propaganda operations. Abane Ramdane, head of the Algiers zone, invited into the Palestro maquis the French journalist Robert Barrat, to whom were presented the demands of the independence movement; Barrat also met with djounoud, National Liberation soldiers.

== Protagonists ==
The ambush pitted the French Army against the Algerian National Liberation Army with, on the French side, the 2nd section of the 2nd Battalion of the 9th Colonial Infantry Regiment. commanded by Second Lieutenant Hervé Artur, and on the Algerian side part of the Ali Khodja commando unit, several groups with a total of some forty djounoud.

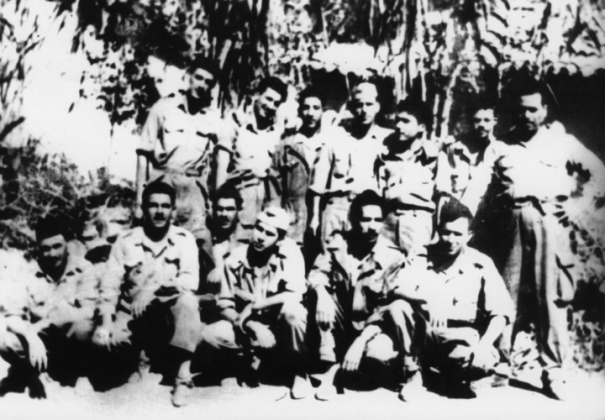
Staff of the ALN wilaya 4, 1956–1957.

Ali Khodja was born in Algiers on January 12, 1933. In October 1955, he deserted from the Hussein Dey barracks with two others, carrying with them weapons, and joined the maquis in Palestro led by Amar Ouamrane. Khodja was entrusted with the command of an ALN section with a strength of one hundred men. He soon distinguished himself in action, becoming the commando Ali Khodja, one of the legends of the ALN. To obtain weapons and clothing, the Khodja unit, like all other units of the NLA at that time, favored ambushes executed in accordance with the motto "Strike, Recover and Stall."

Hervé Artur was born in Paris on September 17, 1926; after his military service in Algeria, he prepared a philosophy degree, which he abandoned for a job in a transport company. At the end of April 1956 he was recalled to military service and served with the rank of second lieutenant in the 9th Colonial Infantry Regiment stationed in Kabylie. This officer, who believed in the pacification of Algeria by the French army, commanded a section of twenty infantry consisting of two sergeants, two corporals, two corporals, and fourteen soldiers. Most were working-class in civilian life.

On the morning of 18 May, the unit went on a reconnaissance mission to the villages near Ouled Djerrah. The guerilla attack lasted less than twenty minutes and ended in an ALN victory. Only five members of the 2nd section survived the ambush: sergeant Alain Chorliet, master corporal Louis Aurousseau, and Lucien Caron. The three were injured, as were two other men, Jean David-Nillet and Pierre Dumas. Gravely wounded, Caron was left with the kabyle villagers of the douar, and the other survivors taken away by the moudjahideen. The two wounded men were entrusted to the villagers of the neighboring douar, Bou Zegza. David-Nillet and Dumas were held as prisoners by Khodja, who retreated into the mountains.

== Mutilations ==
At the moment of leaving the location of the ambush, the soldier Pierre Dumas taken prisoner, saw the elders of the neighboring village of Djerrah arrive. The press of the time reported uncritically that these residents began to mutilate the French soldiers. The true course of events is unknown but the mutilations were not on the scale reported. Lieutenant Artur's throat was cut and his men had knife marks all over their bodies. The eyes of some had been put out, but it was not possible to exclude animals as a cause of this. But gendarmes noted neither emasculations, nor eviscerations. Writings persist to this day that talk of lips and noses cut off, cut throats, eyes put out, throats cut, stomachs eviscerated and stuffed with pebbles, or testicles cut off.

According to Bernard Droz and Évelyne Lever, "these mutilations were carried out by the survivors of the local population, the day after a particularly brutal ratissage, or raid. Yves Courrière shared this point of view, specifying that the mutilations took place "after the death of the French soldiers."

== 23 May 1956: French retaliation ==
On May 19, not having heard from the 2nd section, the French Army sent three battalions and four helicopters to find them. In the helicopters were elements of the 4th squadron of the 13th Parachute Dragoon Regiment (RDP) based at Draâ El Mizan. On May 23, the parachutists of the 1st Foreign Parachute Regiment (1st REP) and of the 20th Colonial Parachute Battalion (20th BPC) found 19 members of commando Ali Khodja fortified in a grotto with the two prisoners, near Tifrène. In the ensuing fighting sixteen moudjahideen were killed and three taken prisoner. Jean David-Nillet was accidentally killed in the assault, and the wounded Pierre Dumas was set free.

Historian Raphaëlle Branche notes that on the afternoon following discovery of the French bodies "forty-four Algerians were summarily killed" while "most, even the military admitted, were fleeing the encircling French troops north of the ambush location." The village of Djerrah was also completely destroyed in reprisal. The actions of Henri Maillot, a militant from the Algerian Communist Party (PCA) who had deserted a few weeks before with a truckful of weapons, has sometimes been juxtaposed to the ambush of May 18, 1956. This hypothesis was rejected by Branche, who underlined the hostility of the FLN towards Maillot's attempt to set up a maquis in the Ouarsenis region.

== Consequences ==
=== Press ===
The Palestro ambush gave the French government reason to put into place strict information controls. Five days after the ambush, on May 21, 1956, Max Lejeune, Armed Forces Secretary, sent General Henri Lorillot an instruction forbidding communication to the press of the numbers of military casualties. Also, a few days later, a code of conduct came to very strictly govern information on military operations in progress. Finally, a communiqué from resident minister Robert Lacoste forbade the press, without authorization, from identifying units engaged in fighting, disclosing casualties sustained by friendly forces, or the names of victims or other information "which might upset the interested families."

=== Executions ===
On 19 June 1956, a month after the ambush, two "rebels" condemned to death were executed, Ahmed Zabana and Abdelkader Ferradj. The choice of Zabana can easily be explained by his important role in the Algerian independence movement, but that of Ferradj seems to only be explained by his membership in the Ali Khodja commando group; he was accused by the press and by the resident minister of having participated in attacks prior to the Palestro ambush. These executions constituted "an answer" to the ambush.

Some clues indicate that Aurousseau and Serreau, the two soldiers who disappeared from the Artur unit, were still alive at the beginning of June 1956, prisoners of the ALN and were possibly executed in reprisal for the deaths of Zabana and Ferradj.

=== Collective memory ===
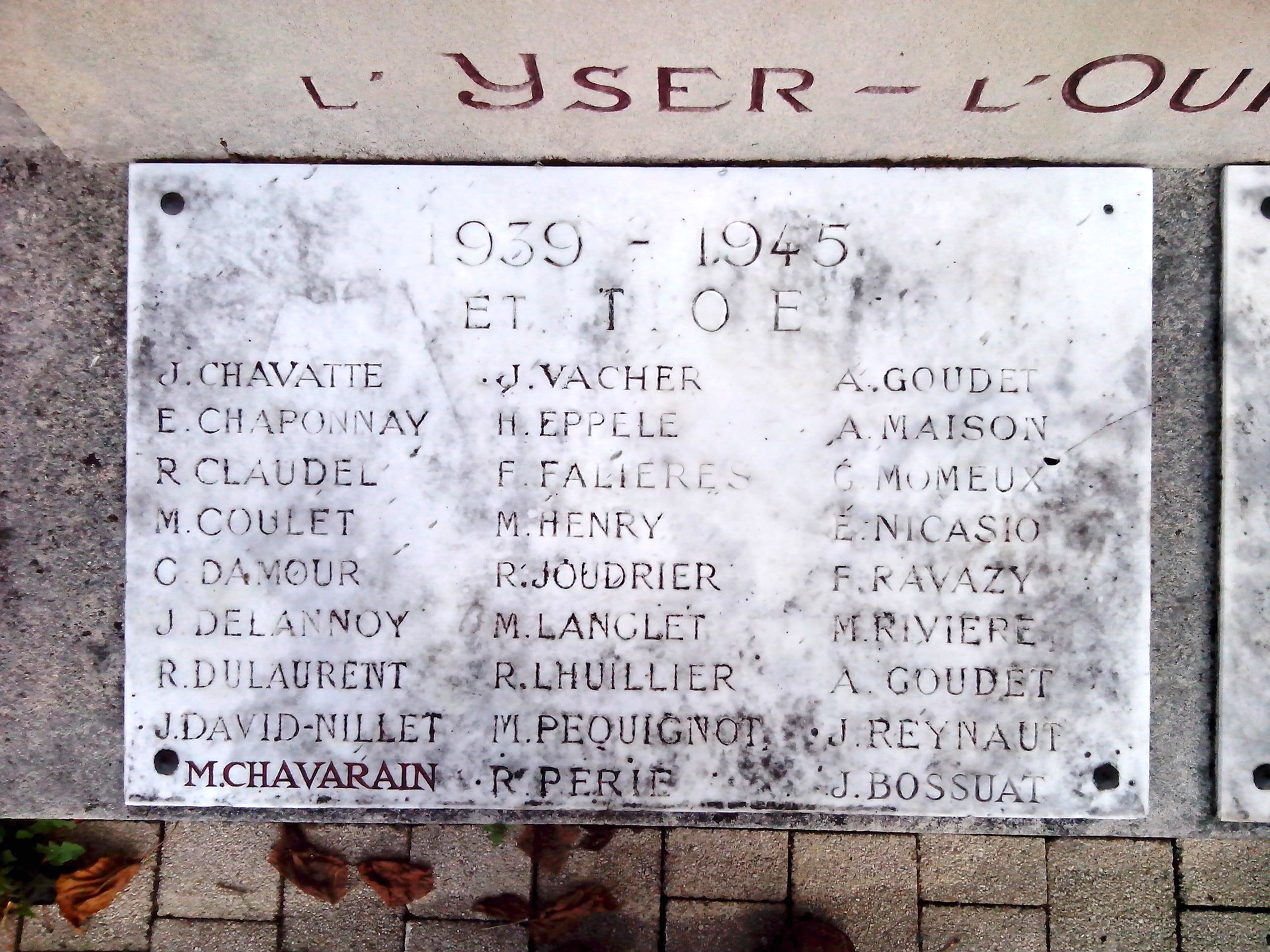
Commemorative plaque on the monument to the dead in Crosne carrying the name of Jean David-Nillet, originally from this town who died in the French Army's assault to free him.

According to historian Benjamin Stora, "Palestro would remain the most famous ambush of the war, a symbol of the worst that can happen: a surprise attack, impossible to defend against, mutilation of corpses. The military hierarchy was also adept at using this trauma to overcome reluctance."

As a military event the ambush itself was not particularly significant, in terms of either casualties or the death of the particular officer commanding the section, the incident was well within the norms of 1956. The event nonetheless took on, in the following days and for very long afterwards, a particular importance, joining in the French imagination, next to the massacre in Constantinois on August 20, 1955, and, a year later, the massacre of Melouza, a triptych that supposedly symbolised the violence and savagery of the independence fighters.

Official discourse, or in the media, associated with the "fellagha" an image of "savagery" and "fanaticism", proof of the "primitive character" of the Algerian being the ambush itself and the mutilations that accompanied it. The word "massacre" came to be used rather than "ambush", as the event was initially called. Finally, the event itself took on a whole other meaning: it was no longer a defeat of the French Army, but violence that targeted — by assimilation — "civilians".

=== Insurrection of 1871 ===
The creation of the French village of Palestro was decreed by Napoléon III in 1869, in the centre of an alluvial plain edged by mountains 80 km south-east of Algiers. The Isser oued flows into this bowl after a course of four kilometers through the rocky defile of the gorges of Palestro. It is a strategic area between Kabylie and the Mitidja coastal plain. It was named for the French victory at the Battle of Palestro.

Less than three years after it was founded, during the revolt of Cheikh Mokrani, the village was attacked April 21, 1871, by 1,500 to 1,800 armed men. Roughly fifty colonists were killed in a few moments: among them were mayor of Palestro Dominique Bassetti, and the brigadier of the gendarmerie, killed with an axe by three detainees freed by the insurgents.

In 1991, the Islamic Salvation Front (FIS), then in 1992, the Armed Islamic Group of Algeria, installed their rear bases there.

Raphëlle Branche, has said that Djerrah (or Palestro) remains the symbol of a place that is difficult to control, where violence seems to almost take on a certain logic.

== See also ==
- Algerian War
- Battle of Bouzegza
- Battle of Algiers

== Sources and bibliography ==
- Raphaëlle Branche, L’Embuscade de Palestro : Algérie 1956, (The Palestro Ambush: Algeria 1956), Paris, Armand Colin, 2010, 256 p. (ISBN 978-2200256074, read online).
- François Buton, « Peut-on dévoiler les imaginaires ? Questions sur l'interprétation d'un massacre », (Can One Unveil the Imaginary? Questions on the Interpretation of a Massacre), Le Mouvement Social, vol. 1, no 238, 2012, p. 81-86.
- Raphaëlle Branche, « Le récit historique et les intentions des acteurs. Réponse à François Buton », (The Historic Account and the Intentions of the Protagonists. Answer to François Buton) Le Mouvement Social, vol. 1, number 238, 2012, p. 87-93.
- Raphaëlle Branche, « 18 mai 1956 : l'embuscade de Palestro/Djerrah », (May 18, 1956: The Ambush at Palestro/Djerrah), in Abderrahmane Bouchène, Jean-Pierre Peyroulou, Ouanassa Siari Tengour and Sylvie Thénault, Histoire de l'Algérie à la période coloniale : 1830–1962, (History of Algeria to the Colonial Period: 1830–1962), Paris, Alger, Éditions La Découverte and Éditions Barzakh, 2012, 717 p. (ISBN 978-2707173263), p. 514-519.
- Ugo Iannucci, Soldat dans les gorges de Palestro.(Soldier in the Gorges of Palestro), Journal de guerre, Aléas, 2

== Documentaries ==
- 2012 : Palestro, Algérie : histoires d'une embuscade, (Palestro, Algeria: Stories of an Ambush), by Rémi Lainé and Raphaëlle Branche (based on Raphaëlle Branche), length 1 h 25m, coproduction : ARTE France, Les Poissons Volants on arte.tv March 19, 2012, consulted 20 September 2013 archive
