= Sadek Hadjeres =

Algerian politician (1928–2022)

Sadek Hadjres
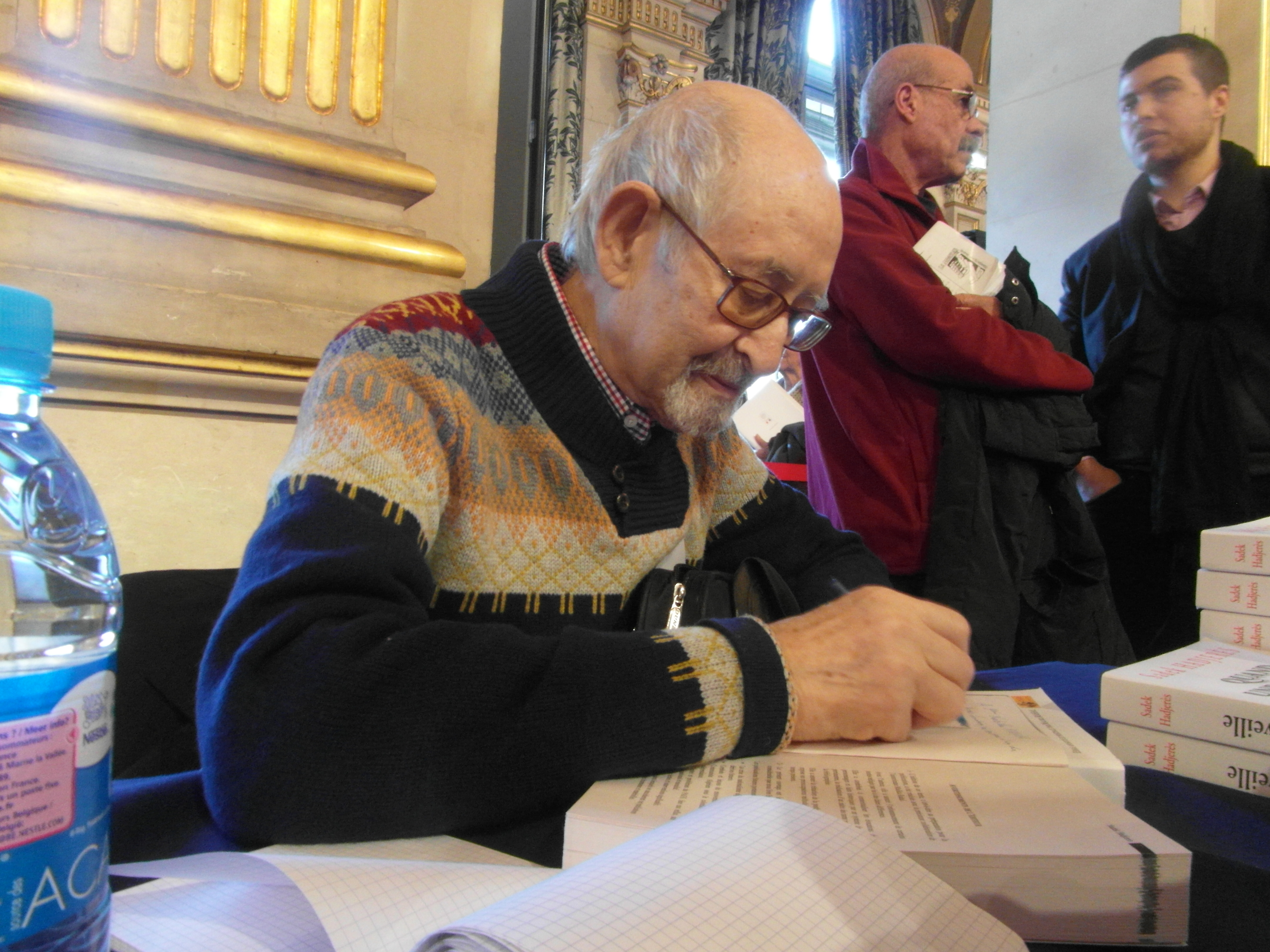
- Hadjeres in 2015
- Born: 13 September 1928; Larbaâ Nath Irathen, French Algeria
- Died: 3 November 2022 (aged 94); Paris, France
- Political party: Algerian Communist Party
- Website: https://www.socialgerie.net/

Sadek Hadjerès (13 September 1928 – 3 November 2022) was an Algerian politician of the Algerian Communist Party.

== Biography ==
Hadjeres went to primary school in Berrouaghia and Larba, and secondary school in Médéa, Blida and Ben Aknoun. During this time he became a medium-level leader of the Algerian Muslim Scouts (Scouts Musulmans Algériens) in the Mitidja from 1943 to 1946 and then a militant of the Algerian People's Party (PPA) in 1944.

From 1946 to 1953 he was a medicine student at the University of Algiers. In 1948 he became the leader of the university section of the Party of the Algerian People, a nationalist party which was arguing for independence from France. In 1949 he was one of the co-authors of the party's platform document 'L'Algerie libre vivra' (Free Algeria will live).

After the so-called Berber crisis of 1949 within the PPA party, Hadjerès left having been involved in the crisis. He himself refused the term 'Berber' for this crisis on several occasions including in 2007 in an interview for the Soir d'Algérie daily newspaper.

After being a member for several years since his youth of the AEMAN, in 1950 he became the president of the AEMAN (Association des étudiants musulmans de l'Afrique du Nord), which was the first political organisation created in North Africa. The AEMAN was created in Algiers in 1912 by Emir Khaled, the grandson of Emir Abdelkader.

In 1951 Sadek Hadjerès joined the Algerian Communist Party (Parti Communiste Algérien). He became a member of the Party Council (Conseil Consultatif) in 1952. In 1953 and 1954 he was the director of the magazine 'Progrès' (Progress) and became the General Advisor of the Party for the El Harrach and Mitidja East regions. That year, the Algerian War had begun on 1 November. In 1955 he became a member of the Political Bureau of the Algerian Communist Party and in December his support for the independence struggle was forced underground. He was condemned in absentia to hard labour by a French court, and became national co-director of the armed organisation 'Combattants of the Liberation', which was the Algerian Communist Party's armed wing and was cooperating with the much larger nationalist guerilla force: the National Liberation Front, but without being a part of it.

With his fellow communist friend Bachir Hadj Ali he negotiated in April, June, and July 1956 with the representatives of the National Liberation Front (Benyoucef Ben Khedda and Abane Ramdane) regarding the integration of the Communist troops into the FLN forces. He continued to fight within the PCA (Algerian communist party) throughout the war, until independence.

After independence in July 1962, he became a member of the Secretariat of the Algerian Communist Party. In October 1962, the new president Ahmed Ben Bella banned the Communist Party which went underground. Sadek Hadjeres then became the coordinator of the Communist Party. During the Socialist Charter of Algiers of 1964 he attempted to advance the ideas of the party. From 1963 to 1965 he was a medical practitioner and medical sciences researcher.

After the coup of Boumediène which ousted Ben Bella from power in 1965, he continued to operate clandestinely for the next 24 years. He was a member of the ORP (Organisation of Popular Resistance) during some of that time at the beginning, and a founding member in 1966 of the PAGS party (Parti de l'Avant Garde Socialiste) which was a new facade for the Communist Party. The Organisation of Popular Resistance had been created by Mohamed Harbi and Hocine Zahouane, two left-wing leaders of the FLN to oppose Boumedienne's coup. Hadjeres joined the ORP while other communist leaders such as Henri Alleg and Larbi Bouhali went into exile. With the leaders exiled, the ORP was weakened and the PAGS party was created the following year.

In the early 70s, Boumediène undertook several leftist projects such as the Agrarian Revolution, the nationalisation of lands and factories, and other such socialist projects. President Boumediène also made Algeria closer to the Eastern bloc of the USSR and all these steps pleased indirectly Sadek Hadjeres' PAGS party which found a favourable political terrain to advance its ideas, while still remaining an opposition closely watched by the government and excluded from all official activities and subject to repression like all other opposition parties.

In 1976 during the debate on the national Charter, Hadjeres led the underground PAGS briefly out of clandestinity by expressing loudly its views via student organisations such as the UNJA. This was the zenith of the communist party's political activities and influence on state affairs in Algeria according to many political commentators.

With the arrival of the new president Benjedid Chadli in 1979 however, and the progressive introduction of right-wing policies, slow liberalisation and the introduction of article 120 which allowed only one party (FLN) to operate legally, Sadek Hadjeres and his PAGS party began to clash more and more with the government and the FLN. The FLN in turn looked for new support within the Islamist currents of Algerian politics. The fact the FLN supported the freedom fighters in Afghanistan combating the USSR only served to sour relations further with Sadek Hadjeres and his PAGS party. The PAGS became more and more clandestine and in 1986 voted for its own expatriation due to internal disputes. Hadjeres would then assist Eastern European Communist Party congresses and conferences, sometimes with the FLN delegation sitting only two rows away, putting the FLN in an uncomfortable position with its socialist partners from the Eastern bloc.

Hadjeres entered back completely into the legal framework in 1989 with the beginning of the multi-party system in Algeria. His re-entry on the Algerian political scene occurred however at a time when the Berlin Wall was falling and his communist convictions were several shaken by the birth of a new era. His communist PAGS party was in this context severely defeated at the 1990 and 1991 elections by the Islamic Salvation Front (FIS) and Hadjeres decided to pull out of politics in 1991. That same year Islamists began violent confrontations with the communists as their doctrines were totally opposed (Islamists were and remained convinced that Hadjeres and his communists are atheists and must be killed). The following year in 1992 several communists were assassinated by Algerian Islamists and this continued until 1994. When the government and the army cancelled the elections in 1992, they asked for Hadjeres' vocal support but he refused to give it, even though he was condemned to death by several Islamist para-military and then terrorist organisations (MIA, FIDA, GIA etc...).

The PAGS party ceased all activity in 1992 and Hadjeres himself left Algeria and settled in France where he undertook work as an associate lecturer and researcher in geopolitics with the CRAG centre of Paris 8 University (Centre de recherches et d’analyses géopolitiques à l'Université de Paris VIII). He published several articles in the journal Hérodote and gave talks at colloquiums and study conferences, as well as publishing articles in the Algerian and international press, and prepared books on the evolution of the national and social Algerian movements, starting with the PPA crisis of 1949.

In 2007, the PAGS returned to the political scene under the name MDS (Democratic and Social Movement). It won one seat in the Algerian Parliament in the 17 May Algerian legislative elections. Sadek Hadjeres continued to be a very influential figure for Algerian communists and members of the MDS until his death, although he did not take part officially in any more political activities.

Hadjerès died on 3 November 2022, in Paris, at the age of 94.
