= Maillot (disambiguation) =

Maillot is the French word for jersey (sports), as well as for swimsuit, and may refer to:

- maillot, swimsuit

== Places ==
- Maillot, Yonne, town in France
- Neuilly–Porte Maillot station, RER station in Paris, France
- Porte Maillot station, Paris Metro station in Paris, France
- Theuville-aux-Maillots, French commune in the Seine-Maritime département

== Sports ==
- Maillot jaune (yellow jersey), maillot vert (green jersey), maillot à pois rouges (polka dot jersey), or maillot blanc (white jersey): colors of the jerseys worn by the leader of each classification in the Tour de France
- Prix de la Porte Maillot, Group 3 flat horse race in France
- Pour Un Maillot Jaune, Title of a documentary about the 1965 Tour de France

== People ==
- Frédéric Maillot, French politician from Réunion
- Jean-Christophe Maillot (born 1960), French dancer and choreographer
- Henri Maillot (1928-1956), pied noir member of the Algerian Communist Party
- Members of the Maillot de la Treille line:
  - Nicolas Maillot de la Treille (1725–1794), theologian
  - Nikolaus Freiherr von Maillot de la Treille (1774–1834), Bavarian general and war minister
