= Autonomous Zone of Algiers =

Autonomous Zone of Algiers (ZAA)
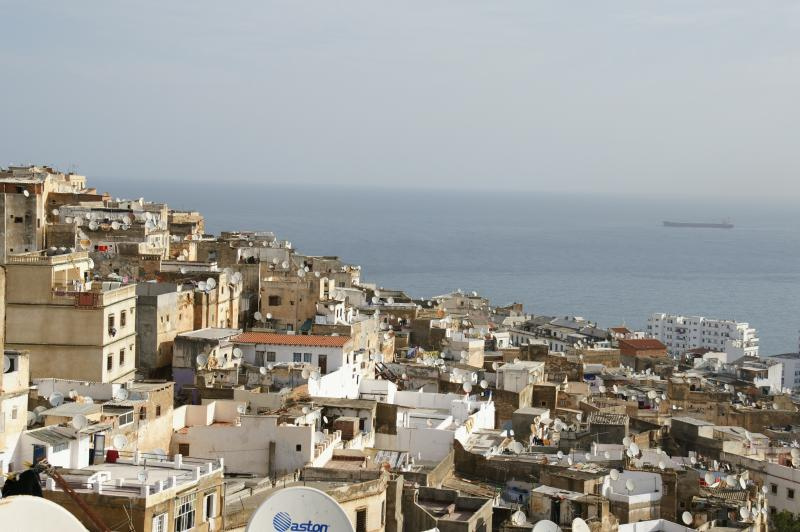
- The Casbah of Algiers — “the urban maquis”; the Casbah, favourable to complete clandestinity for FLN leaders, was the headquarters of the ZAA general staff.
- Active: 1956–1962
- Country: Algeria
- Allegiance: FLN
- Branch: ALN
- Role: Urban guerrilla; subversion; sabotage and bomb attacks
- Size: 5,000 (approx.)
- Engagements: Battle of Algiers; struggle against the OAS; 1962 summer crisis

Commanders
- Notable commanders: Abane Ramdane · Krim Belkacem · Larbi Ben M'hidi · Yacef Saâdi · Haffaf Arezki · Ali la Pointe

The Autonomous Zone of Algiers (in French: Zone autonome d'Alger, ZAA) was the FLN’s organisational structure for the capital during the Algerian War (1954–1962). Created following the Soummam Congress of 20 August 1956, the ZAA covered the city of Algiers specifically; other territorial divisions were organised as six numbered “wilayas”. Shortly before the eight-day general strike of January 1957 during the Battle of Algiers, the ZAA was organised into three territorial regions and had distinct political, military and financial components.

== History ==
=== Creation of the Autonomous Zone of Algiers ===
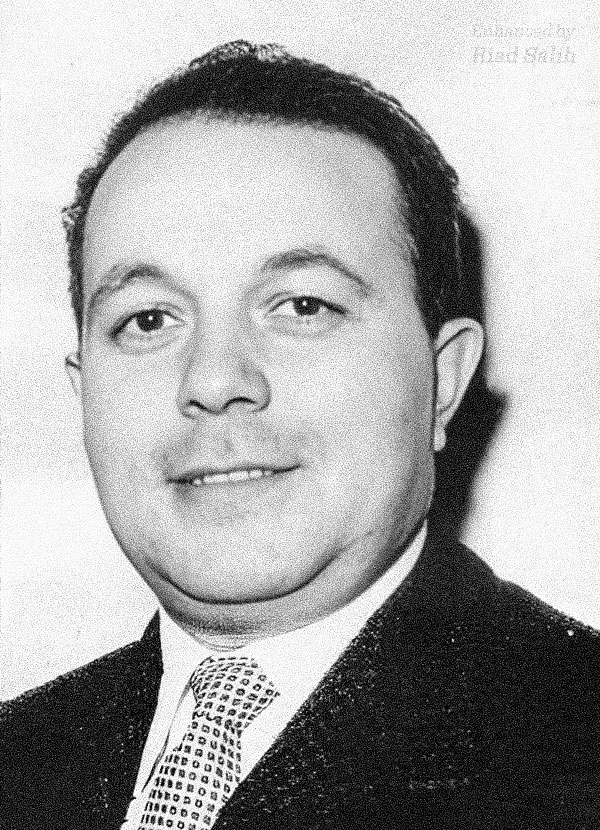
Abane Ramdane, political and financial leader and member of the CCE during the early phase of the Battle of Algiers.

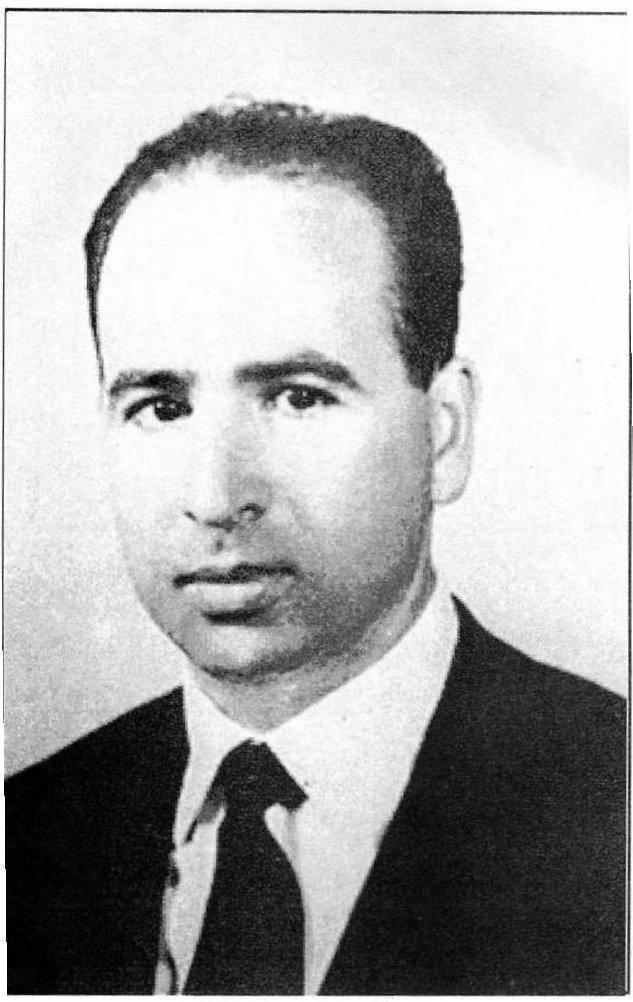
Krim Belkacem, in charge of liaison and chief of staff during the early phase of the Battle of Algiers.

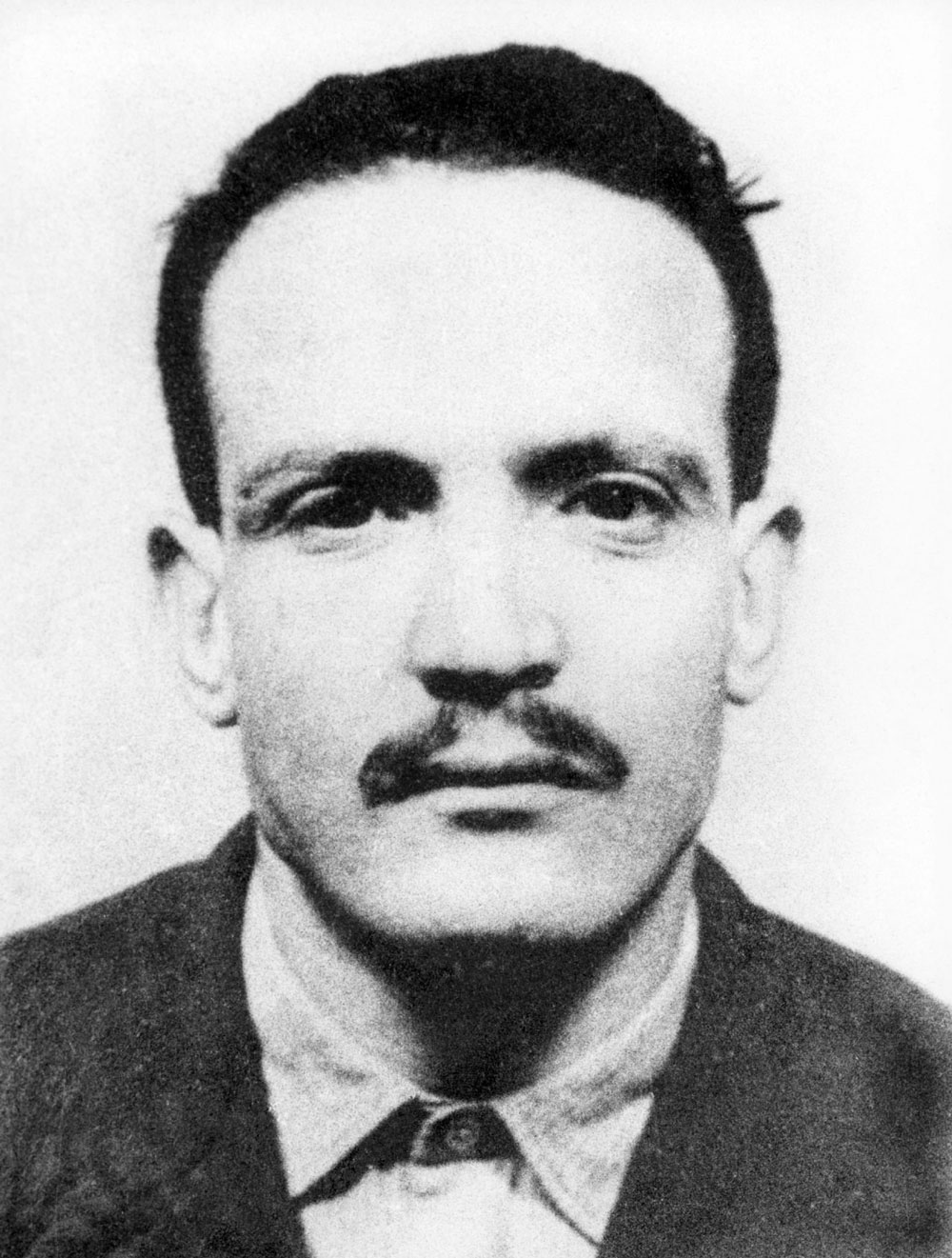
Larbi Ben M'hidi, responsible for armed action during the early phase of the Battle of Algiers.

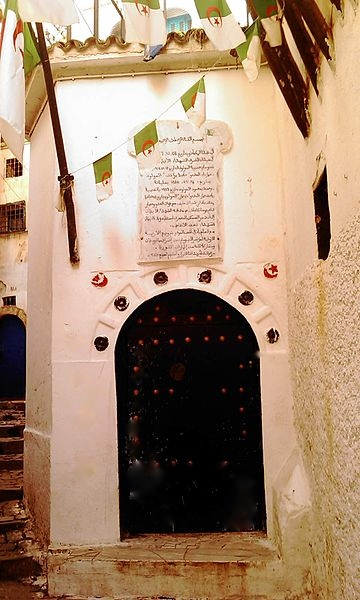
The house of Yacef Saâdi in the upper Casbah, where the first meeting of the CCE took place and which also served as a hideout for Ali la Pointe before it was destroyed by the 1st REP on 8 October 1957.

Newly elected at the Soummam Congress, members of the Committee of Coordination and Execution (CCE) met clandestinely — after an initial meeting at the house of Nassima Hablal — at the house of Yacef Saâdi in the upper Casbah: Abane Ramdane, Larbi Ben M'hidi, Krim Belkacem, Saâd Dahlab and Benyoucef Benkhedda — the effective leaders of the revolution — decided to base their seat in the Casbah of Algiers where they expected better control over FLN militants, superior lines of liaison and, above all, because they believed the capital favoured total clandestinity with its many safe houses, network of couriers and protections. Sitting in Algiers also meant being at the heart of Algeria and being in a position to deploy urban guerrilla tactics, which they considered as important as fighting in the rural maquis.

The five men divided responsibilities as follows: Benkhedda took charge of contacts with Europeans and the management of the new Autonomous Zone of Algiers (now detached from Wilaya IV); Dahlab took propaganda and the direction of the newspaper El Moudjahid; Ben M’hidi became responsible for armed action in Algiers (and thus was the direct superior of Yacef Saâdi); Krim Belkacem assumed liaison with the different wilayas, making him the chief of staff and the strategist for the armed struggle; finally, Abane Ramdane became political and financial head — effectively number one despite the collegial intent of the “five”.

When the CCE left Algiers on 25 February 1957, shortly after the arrest of Ben M'hidi, it delegated its powers over the ZAA to Abdelmalek Temmam, a substitute member of the CNRA. After Temmam’s arrest in 1957, Yacef Saâdi took charge of what remained of the organisation, severely weakened by repeated assaults from General Jacques Massu’s parachute division and thus accumulated leadership of both the political and military branches. Yacef was later betrayed by the “bleus” of the Intelligence and Operations Group (GRE) under Captain Paul-Alain Léger; in particular Hacène Ghendriche (known as Zerrouk), who collaborated in the capture of the ZAA leader on 24 September 1957. The last surviving top leader, Ali la Pointe, assumed command for only two weeks before being located in Rue des Abderames in the Casbah of Algiers and dying with comrades Hassiba Ben Bouali and the 12-year-old child « Petit Omar » when the house was blown up by the 1st REP on 8 October 1957. The first phase of the Battle of Algiers thus ended, as did the first chapter in the history of the ZAA.

At the end of 1958, Larbi Alilat (alias Abdelhatif), together with Belkacem Betouche, discreetly formed a network linked with Wilaya IV. The zone was reconstituted by Commander Azzedine on 14 May 1962; he brought militants from the FLN Federation in France to help dismantle the OAS. The ZAA was independent of Wilayas III and IV. Commander Azzedine was reported to have frequent contacts with the prefect of Algiers, Vitalis Cros, and with Michel Hacq, one of the two heads of the French “Mission C” (named from December 1961), the official French organisation fighting the OAS, which from January 1962 handed over lists of OAS activists compiled by the French mission. Azzedine organised kidnappings of Europeans in April–May 1962 in greater Algiers and ordered executions in May, prompting the French government to put mild pressure on the head of the provisional executive, Abderrahmane Farès, to have Azzedine stopped or apprehended.

=== Summer crisis of 1962 ===
In Algiers, Yacef Saâdi, who had retaken leadership of the ZAA during the summer of 1962 after his release from French prisons, formed some 4,000 armed men. He rallied with all weapons to the “Oujda clan” and opposed Wilaya IV, which remained loyal to GPRA men who had taken control of the capital. Yacef seized the radio, the port and many administrations and refused to recognise Ahmed Ben Bella. Violent clashes took place in the Casbah of Algiers between ZAA units and forces from Wilaya IV; there were dead and wounded, including many civilians. The people of Algiers took to the streets to demand peace, shouting: “**Sebaa Snine Barakat!**” — “Seven years, enough!”

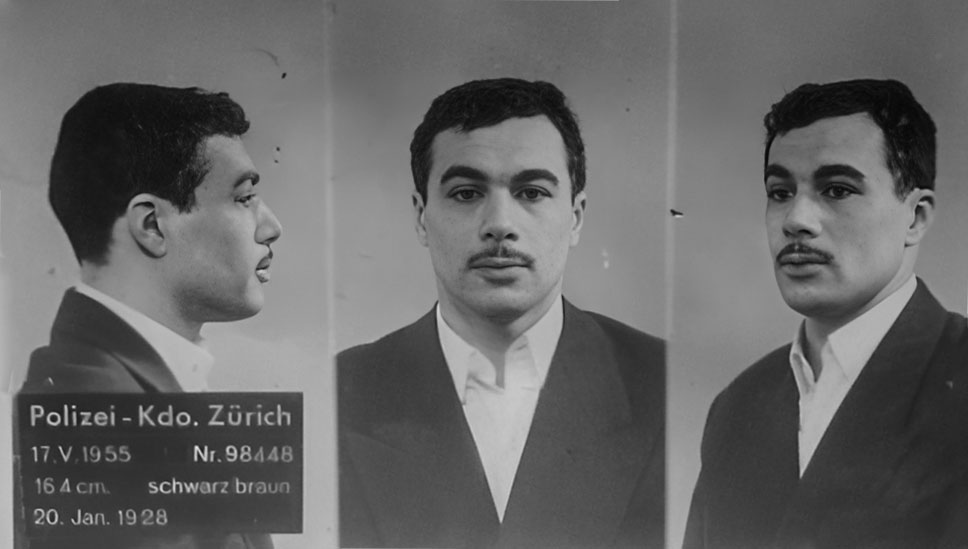
Yacef Saâdi, political-military head of the Autonomous Zone of Algiers (ZAA) and emblematic figure of the Battle of Algiers.

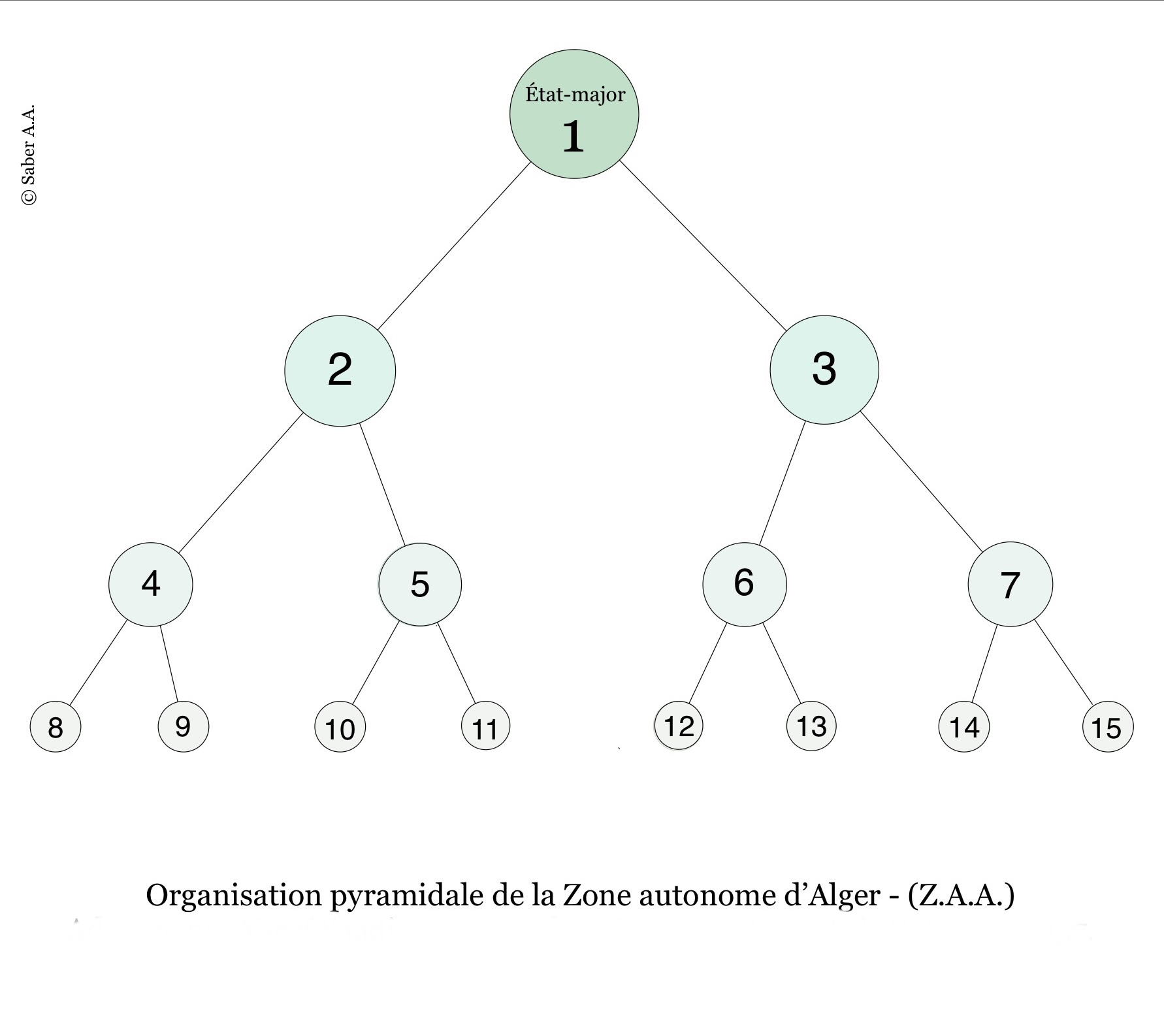
Pyramidal system adopted by Yacef Saâdi, politico-military head of the ZAA.

== Organisation ==
=== Pyramidal system ===
Yacef Saâdi adopted a pyramidal cell system of three members. In each cell one militant knew his superior but not the third member. This structure limited loose talk (always dangerous) and reduced the risk that an arrested man would, under torture, reveal organisational details. An intermediate leader knew only three men: two under his orders and one above him. He knew nothing of men at the base or at the apex.

At the time the chain of command included: Commander Ben M’Hidi (alias El Hakim) with deputies Yacef Saâdi (alias Si Djaâfar, Réda Lee) and Haffaf Arezki (alias Houd), and Ali la Pointe as Yacef’s adjutant.

- **Region I**: Abderrahmane Arbadji. Deputy: Othmane Hadji (Khamel).
- **Region II**: Abderrahmane Adder (Si Hammoud). Deputy: Ahcène Ghandriche (Zerrouk).
- **Region III**: Omar Bencharif (Hadj Omar). Deputy: Boualem Benabderrahmane (Abaza).
  - Political commissar**: Mohamed El Hadi Hadj-Smaïne (Kamel).

(Alternative listings and regional deputy names circulated in contemporary organisational charts; the ZAA also used variant regional leadership names — Aldi Ziane, Hachem Malek, Si El Mahfoud Belloumi, Slimane Amirat — each with deputies, depending on the stage and the attrition of leaders.)

At the eve of the Battle of Algiers (late 1956), the theoretical organisation was described as follows.

=== Military branch ===
The military branch developed the urban maquis and armed groups, which formed the bulk of its troops, plus commandos tasked with special “strike” operations, often seeking spectacular impact. Each region comprised three groups of three cells of three men each (theoretical total 27 men). Each region had a military chief and deputy (2), supported by three group chiefs and three deputies (6) — a theoretical total of about 35 men per region and some 105 combatants for the whole of Algiers.

=== Political branch ===
The political branch’s role was mobilisation, propaganda and information, dissemination of FLN directives and slogans, and the production of tracts and leaflets for militants and sympathisers (including the publication of El Moudjahid). It could field its own intervention groups — distinct from the military’s armed groups — giving it a quasi-paramilitary character and the ability to use armed force when the security of the organisation required it, without necessarily appealing to the military branch.

Each region was subdivided into sectors (3–5), districts (8–18), sub-districts, groups, half-groups, cells and half-cells of three men. Political cadres were classified as militants (those with responsibilities), adherents (who could lend a hand for tasks or meetings) and sympathisers (who paid an *ichtirâk* — a contribution). In practice, each region had a core of several dozen active militants who could form shock groups for intimidation; many of these structures inherited personnel and methods from the pre-FLN MTLD.

=== Bomb network ===
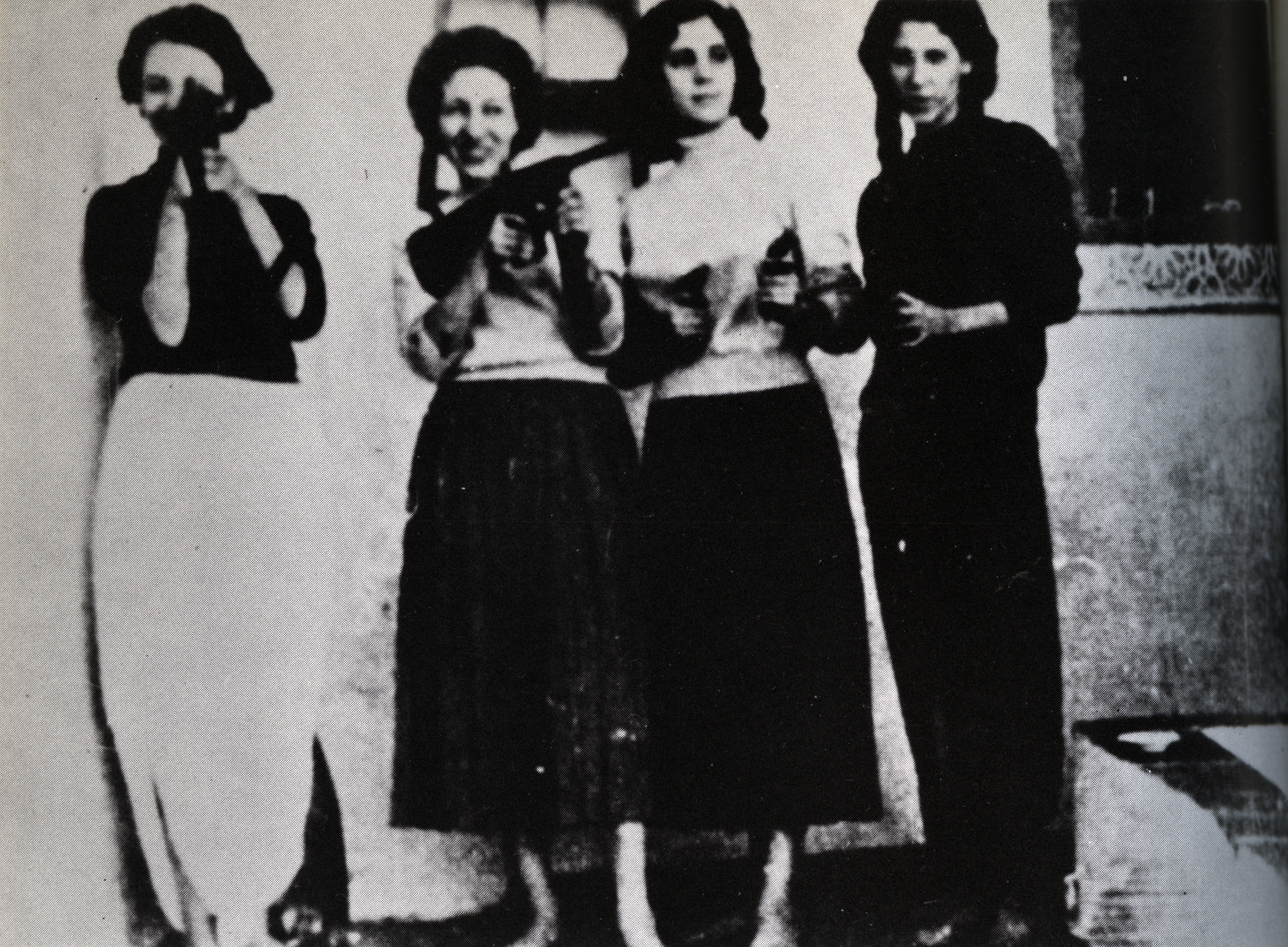
Members of the ZAA’s “bomb network”: Samia Lakhdari, Zohra Drif, Djamila Bouhired and Hassiba Ben Bouali.

Directly dependent on the ZAA council in summer 1956, the bomb network emerged within the military branch. It initially included scientists turned chemists — such as Abderrahmane Taleb — and militants from the CDL (Combattants de la Libération), including Debih Cherif, Habib Redha, Sid Ali Haffaf, Hamid Doukanef, Boualem “Tapioca” Giorgio, Daniel Timsit and Abdelaziz Bensadok. The network was organised into four teams: casing, explosives makers, transport and bomb placers. Women played a notable role in transport and placement — e.g. Djaouher Akrour, Hassiba Ben Bouali, Djamila Bouazza, Djamila Bouhired, Zohra Drif, Baya Hocine, Djamila Boupacha, Samia Lakhdari, Danièle Minne (Djamila Amrane-Minne), Annie Steiner, etc. Disguise methods ranged from using the Algerian *hayek* veil to hide devices, to beach bags carried by young women of European appearance who could pass through the security cordons.

=== Intelligence network ===
In Algiers the FLN sought information on French army deployments — strength, armament and planned operations — to avoid and to prepare attacks. A specific organisation developed at all levels under a liaison-intelligence responsible (RLR) under the command of “Houd” Haffaf Arezki, who maintained ties with the population.

Yacef Saadi recorded in his memoirs the existence of an intelligence committee within his politico-administrative apparatus (DPA). Targets included the 10th military region and the cabinet of Minister Lacoste, where the ZAA reportedly had a mole (Fadila Attia). Intelligence collection drew on dockworkers, artists, sex workers, prisoners and liberal Europeans.

Abderrazak Haffaf (Houd) centralised information. Some of the best informants were individuals in the French security apparatus; some informants were double agents working for the GRE under Captain Léger (most notably Hacène Ghendriche, Zerrouk), whose betrayal led to the dismantling of much of the ZAA in September 1957, although double agents also fed useful information to Yacef.

A dossier on torture was compiled by the ZAA in July 1957, published by *El Moudjahid* and handed to Germaine Tillion.

Intelligence collected on security forces in Algiers was often fragmentary and inaccurate; it did not enable the ZAA to organise major attacks against the 10th RM, General Massu or the French General Government.

=== ZAA committees ===
Specialised committees included accommodation and liaison committees; the latter worked closely with the intelligence committee (later replaced by the liaison-intelligence branch) on relations with other wilayas, the CCE, Maghrebi neighbours and the FLN Federation in France, under Haffaf Arezki (“Houd”). There were also committees of scholars and intellectuals, a justice committee to supervise and sanction wrongdoers, a social and medical aid committee (doctors, dentists, nurses, midwives) to treat the wounded (which in June 1957 took the name of the Red Crescent), and corporative committees (for professions: vegetable vendors, tram drivers, railway workers, dockers). A trade union committee functioned as a liaison with the UGTA and the UGCA. Planned financial and women’s committees did not fully materialise despite the essential role women played in the Battle of Algiers.

== Strength ==
According to the theoretical organigram, the total membership of militants and armed group members is estimated at around 5,000 people.

== In culture ==
=== In film ===
- The Battle of Algiers (*La battaglia di Algeri*), directed by Gillo Pontecorvo (1966).
- The Centurions (also *Lost Command*), directed by Mark Robson (1966).
- Yves Boisset documentary: *Bataille d'Alger* (TV), France 2 (2007).

== See also ==
- Battle of Algiers
- Yacef Saadi
