= Combattants de la Libération =

Former guerrilla group of the Algerian Communist Party

Les Combattants de la Libération (CDL), also known as Le Maquis Rouge, were a guerrilla group established by the Algerian Communist Party (PCA) after the outbreak of the Algerian War of Independence.

The FLN did not welcome a rival on the scene and its mistrust was heightened by memories of the participation of the Algerian Communist Party in the repression after the Setif riot in 1945. The FLN admitted members of the communist party into its ranks as individual members but would not countenance the existence of a separate guerrilla force.

The CDL was never a large group but did have both Muslim and European members. Abdelkader Guerroudj, a Muslim, was a political officer who tried to establish a liaison between the organization and the FLN. Three European members were Maurice Laban, Fernand Iveton and Henri Maillot.

In April 1956, Maillot, a PCA member, deserted the French army, taking with him to the CDL an important stock of arms and ammunition. Less than two months later, an informer gave away their location and the group was ambushed by a unit of French army, Maillot and Laban being killed; there are suspicions that the army was assisted by information leaked by the FLN. Less than a month later, on 1 July 1956, an agreement was signed, integrating the PCA and the CDL into the FLN.
