= Abdelkader Guerroudj =

Algerian politician (1928–2020)

Abdelkader Guerroudj (26 July 1928 – 7 November 2020) was an Algerian man who was condemned to death in December 1957 along with his French wife, Jacqueline Guerroudj. They were convicted as accomplices of Fernand Iveton, the only European who was guillotined for his part in the Algerian revolt. As a result of a high-profile campaign in France, where the issue was called L'Affaire Guerroudj, neither was executed.

== Biography ==
Guerroudj was born on 26 July 1928 in Tlemcen. He was a political officer of the Algerian Communist Party who liaised between the Communist Combattants de la Libération and the FLN.

His stepdaughter, Danièle Minne, was sentenced, on 4 December 1957, to 7 years in prison for her part in the revolt.

A declaration made by Guerroudj to the court is sometimes cited as showing that some pro-independence Algerian activists nevertheless hoped for close relations with France after independence:

"I am sure that we will need material, technicians, doctors and professors to construct our country; it is to France which we address ourselves first. I believe that would be in the true interest of both of our countries. It is not in the interest of France to have valets ready at every moment here to run to the call of the most powerful master, but friends who have freely consented to this friendship."

Guerroudj died on 7 November 2020, at the age of 92.
