= Fernand Iveton =

Algerian freedom fighter

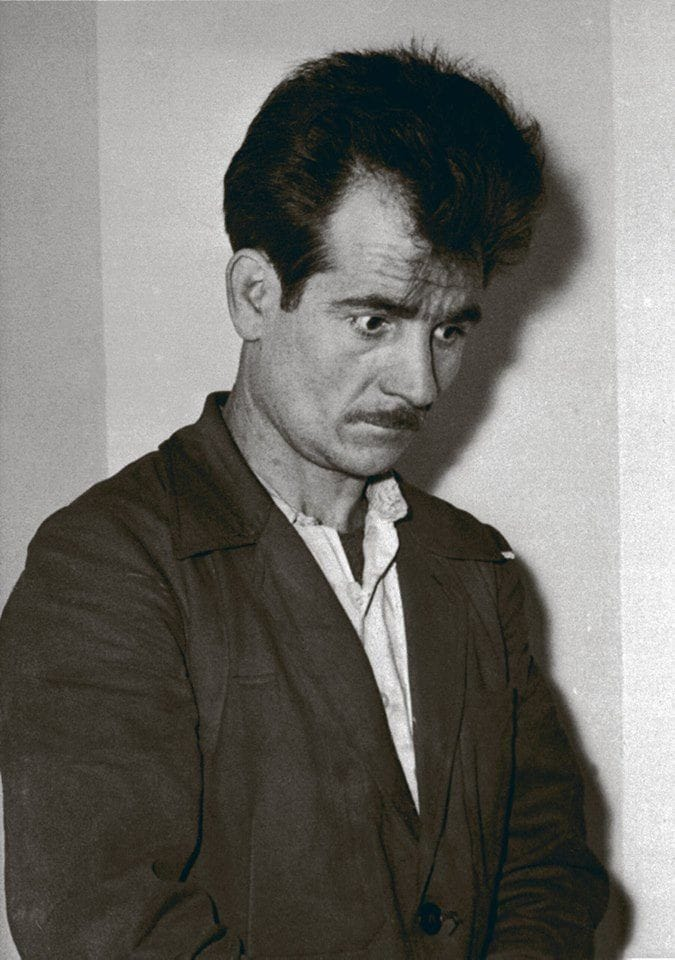
- Born: 12 January 1926; Algiers, French Algeria
- Died: 11 February 1957 (aged 31); Barberousse Prison, Algiers, French Algeria
- Cause of death: Execution by guillotine
- Organization(s): Combattants de la Libération; National Liberation Army
- Political party: Algerian Communist Party
- Movement: National Liberation Front
- Spouse: Hélène Ksiazek (m. 1953)

Fernand Iveton (sometimes misspelled as Yveton; 12 January 1926 – 11 February 1957) was the only pied-noir among the 198 members of the FLN who were executed (as opposed to being killed in battle) during the Algerian War.

== Biography ==
=== Early life ===
Iveton was born in Algiers to a Spanish mother and a French father, and grew up in the El Madania neighborhood. His father, Pascal, was a member of the Algerian Communist Party (PCA) and a trade unionist, who had been dismissed from his job at the state gas company EGA under the Vichy regime.

Like his father, Fernand took up work as a turner at the EGA gasworks in the El Hamma neighborhood of Algiers, and joined the youth wing of the PCA in 1943. He also joined the Algerian CGT, and later the UGSA, and was elected a trade union representative at the El Hamma gasworks. In 1953 he married Hélène Ksiazek, a Polish emigrant whom he had met in Paris.

=== Militant activity ===
In June 1955 Iveton joined the Combattants de la Libération (CDL), the guerrilla wing of the PCA. After an agreement between the PCA and the National Liberation Front (FLN) in July 1956, the CDL was integrated into the National Liberation Army (ALN).

After already having participated in several sabotage actions of the ALN, Iveton was given the task of planting a bomb at his workplace in November 1956. In order not to kill anybody, he placed the bomb in his locker and set the timer so that the bomb would explode when the gasworks would be empty. However, because of his political record, Iveton was closely watched, and the bomb was found before it could explode.

=== Arrest, trial, and execution ===
Iveton was arrested on 14 November 1956, tortured, and sentenced to death by a military tribunal after a one-day trial on 24 November. The trial is reported to have taken place under an "atmosphere of hatred": insults were hurled at Iveton, and his lawyers were threatened. At the suggestion of François Mitterrand, at the time minister of justice in the SFIO-led government of Guy Mollet, the trials of FLN militants were to be accelerated, and those who had their pardons refused were to have their death sentences executed as soon as possible.

Despite pleas by Iveton's lawyers, noting the fact that nobody had been killed or injured, or would have been killed or injured if the bomb had exploded, French president René Coty refused to commute his sentence on 10 February 1957. Iveton was guillotined, together with fellow FLN militants Mohamed Ouennouri and Ahmed Lakhnèche, in the yard of Barberousse Prison prison in Algiers the following day.

=== Aftermath ===
Shortly after Iveton's execution, his accomplices, Jacqueline and Abdelkader Guerroudj, were tried. Jacqueline had been given the task of handing the bomb materials to Iveton; on being given the assurance that no lives would be lost, she did so. Like Iveton, the Guerroudjs were sentenced to death; however, after a high-profile campaign in France, which involved Jean-Paul Sartre and Simone de Beauvoir, their sentences were never carried out, and they were released following the Évian Accords in 1962.

== In popular culture ==
Joseph Andras' novel De nos frères blessés, published in May 2016, is centered around Fernand Iveton. The novel was awarded the Prix Goncourt for debut novels; however, Andras declined the prize. It was translated into English by Simon Leser as Tomorrow They Won't Dare to Murder Us in 2021.

== Sources ==
- Letter from Fernand Iveton to his lawyer Joë Nordmann, 8 February 1957
- Jean-Luc Einaudi, Pour l'exemple, l'affaire Fernand Iveton, Éditions L’Harmattan, Paris, 1986 ISBN 2-85802-721-8
