= Abderrahmane Taleb =

Also known by his wartime pseudonym Mohand Akli (born 1930)

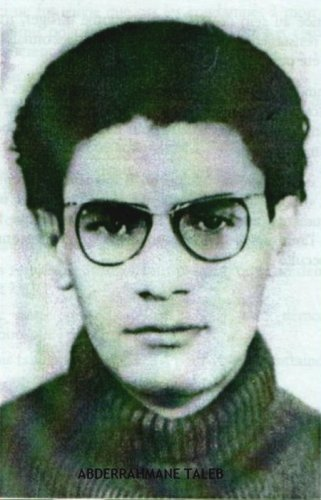
Abderrahmane Taleb

Abderrahmane Taleb (in Kabyle: ⵎoⵀⴰⵏⴷ ⴰⴽⵍⵉ, in Arabic: طالب عبد الرحمان), also known by his wartime pseudonym Mohand Akli, born on 5 March 1930 in the Casbah of Algiers, was the artificer of the Autonomous Zone of Algiers during the Battle of Algiers. He was guillotined on 24 April 1958 at the Barberousse Prison (now Serkadji prison) in Algiers.

== Biography ==
Born in Sidi Ramdane in the Casbah of Algiers of a family originating from Azeffoun in Kabylie, Taleb Abderrahmane attended the Fateh school, then the Sarrouy school in Soustara where he had Mohand Lechani as a teacher, among others, before joining the Guillemin college, currently the Okba high school, in Bab El Oued, where the prevailing racial discrimination forced him to leave the school and continue his studies in private institutions.

He applied as a free candidate to the University of Algiers. He was accepted and enrolled in the Faculty of Sciences in order to pursue studies in chemistry.

At the call of the FLN, he left the faculty benches to devote himself to the national cause and joined the maquis in 1956, in the wilaya III.

Then, following the attack of August 10, 1956, in the street of Thèbes in the Casbah of Algiers perpetrated by ultras of the French Algeria against the Algerian civil populations, the chemistry student is assigned to the Autonomous zone of Algiers to manufacture explosives in makeshift laboratories.

In the company of Rachid Kaouche, he set up a clandestine workshop at the impasse de la grenade in the Casbah, then another at the Villa des Roses in El Biar. But on 11 October 1956, a spark caused an explosion that killed his friend and drew the attention of the French military to their activities.

Taleb Abderrahmane found refuge with his combat brothers in the mountains of Chréa.

Actively sought, he was apprehended in June 1957 south of Blida by the 3rd Regiment of Marine Infantry Parachutists. Considered as the artificer of the Bombing network of Yacef Saâdi during the Battle of Algiers, he was sentenced to death by the Permanent Court of the Armed Forces of Algiers on 7 December 1957, at the same time as Djamila Bouhired, Djamila Bouazza and Abdelghani Marsali.

He was executed on 24 April 1958, at dawn. On the day of his execution, he told the imam appointed by the colonial administration to read the Fatiha: "Take a weapon and join the maquis!"
