= Danièle Djamila Amrane-Minne =

French feminist

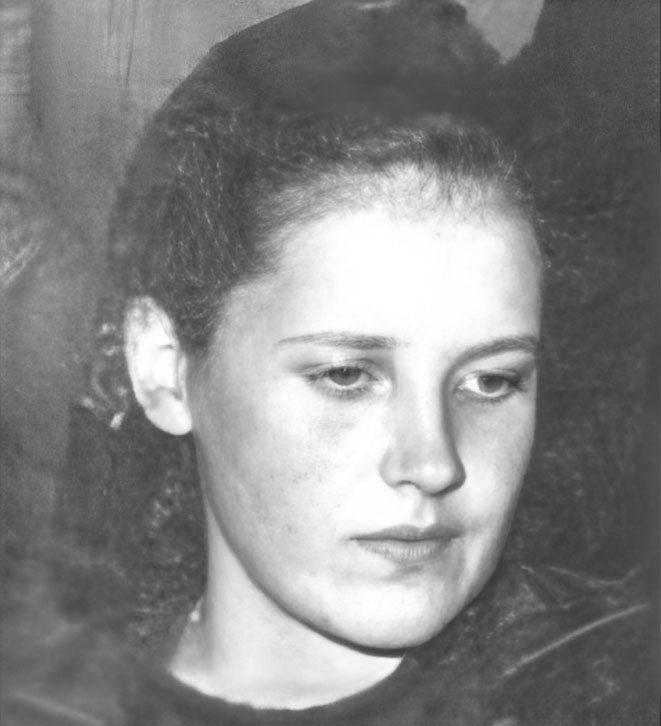
- Born: August 13, 1939; Neuilly-sur-Seine, France
- Died: February 11, 2017 (aged 77)
- Resting place: Béjaïa, Algeria
- Years active: 1956–1962
- Organization: National Liberation Army (ALN)

See also Djamila Bouhired

Danièle Minne (13 August 1939 at Neuilly-sur-Seine – February 2017) was one of the few European women convicted of assisting the FLN during the Algerian War. Her mother Jacqueline Netter-Minne-Guerroudj and her stepfather Abdelkader Guerroudj, were both condemned to death as accomplices of Fernand Iveton, the only European who was guillotined for his part in the Algerian revolt. Her mother was never executed, partly due to a campaign on her behalf conducted by Simone de Beauvoir; her stepfather was also freed.

Danièle Minne joined the struggle when she was 17, going underground under the nom de guerre of Djamila. Minne was considered a woman combatant in the Algerian War known as a fidayat. She "planted at least two bombs during the Battle of Algiers, and joined the maquis in wilaya 3 in 1957". A historian, Alistair Horne, described one of Minne's missions:

"The targets were the Otomatic, a favourite students's bar on the Rue Michelet; the Cafeteria opposite (second time over) and the Coq-Hardi, a popular brasserie…placed in the ladies' lavatory, Daniéle Minne's bomb in the Otomatic seriously injured a young girl and several others".

Arrested and jailed in December 1956, she was sentenced, on 4 December 1957, to 7 years in prison by a juvenile tribunal.

Freed after independence in 1962, she wrote a PhD dissertation on the participation of Algerian women in the war, based on interviews with eighty-eight women between 1978 and 1986; the dissertation was later published as a book, Des femmes dans la guerre d'Algérie (Karthala, Paris). The book was the basis for the film Algeria: Women at War by Parminder Vir.

Danièle Minne became Djamila Amrane by marriage in 1964. She later worked at the University of Algiers but, by 1999, was a professor of history and feminist studies at the University of Toulouse.

== Des femmes dans la guerre d'Algérie ==
Amrane's Des femmes dans la guerre d'Algérie, "remains the major historical study on women's participation in the Algerian War" and identifies not only why women were involved in the war, but the various roles of women combatants and their contributions to the FLN. Her research is based mainly on interviews with former FLN women activists and consists of "eighty-eight interviews with Algerian women combatants". As a militant herself, Minne "was in a privileged position to conduct person interviews that probe the intimate experiences of militant women". However, it is also clear that as a former militant her work has been "influenced by her reconstruction and understanding of her own role during the war".

Minne limits herself as a historian by making it clear through her cited testimony that women had indeed been tortured but chose to leave much unsaid in this regard. The rationale behind this was, "given the trauma inflicted upon torture victims, she did not feel that she could interview her subjects about their ordeal. In her view, their silence proved their wish to forget a traumatic episode". In this sense, Minne's Des femmes dans la guerra d'Algérie "breaks the silence surrounding women's participation in the war, yet contributes to the silence concerning torture and its psychological consequences" that would last for decades after Algeria's independence. It would not be until a decade later that the memoir of Louisette Ighilariz would come to light, thus revealing in more detail the nature of torture during the Algerian War.

Amrane also completed important research on the estimate of women who had participated in the Algerian War by using the register of the Ministry of Mujahidin. She concluded that "there were 10,949 FLN-ALN female activists; 3.10 percent of the total number of FLN-ALN members".

== The Otomatic attack (January 26, 1957) ==
Danièle Minne took part in the student strike in 1956 and joined the rebellion of Algerian nationalists under the name of Djamila. Member of the "bomb network" of the FLN during the Battle of Algiers, she was part of the group of young women bombers in public places of Algiers, in particular cafes frequented by young people, causing the death of several people.

== University and poetry ==
After Algeria's independence Danièle Minne opted for Algerian and deviant nationality Djamila Amrane since her marriage in 1964. She studied at Algerian University. After earning a doctorate (1988), she became, in 1999, a professor of history and feminine studies at the University of Toulouse. Other poems, except for several works written, were funded by 88 entries made between 1978 and 1986, on the participation of Algerian women in the "liberation war".

Poems by Djamila Amrane are among those by twenty-six authors in Espoir et parole.

== Works ==
Women and Politics in Algeria from the War of Independence to Our Day Research in African Literatures 30.3 (1999) 62-77
