= Larbi Bouhali =

Algerian politician (1912–?)

Larbi Bouhali (Arabic: العربي بوهالي; born 1912 in El Kantara) was an Algerian communist politician. He served as general secretary of the Algerian Communist Party.

Bouhali was from an Arab peasant family. In 1934, he travelled to Moscow, where he received political training for nine months. He took part in the founding congress of the Algerian Communist Party in 1936. In 1939, he was named secretary of the Algerian People's Aid (Secours populaire algerien), an organization dedicated to assisting victims of colonial repression.

In 1940, Bouhali, along with other Communist Party leaders, was imprisoned and deported to the Sahara, where he was detained at the Djenien-Bou-Rezg concentration camp. At the third party congress, held in 1947, Bouhali was elected general secretary, replacing Amar Ouzegane.

Bouhali was exiled throughout the Algerian War of Independence. When the insurrection broke out, he moved to France, and after the banning of the Algerian Communist Party on 13 September 1955, he migrated to East Germany, where he remained at the time of Algerian independence, in 1962. Bouhali returned to Algeria but went into exile again (along with other communist leaders) a few months after the 1965 coup d'état.

He later became a member of the central leadership of the Socialist Vanguard Party (PAGS).

Bouhali represented the Algerian communists at different international events, such as the 10th anniversary of the People's Republic of China in Beijing in 1959 and the 1969 International Meeting of Communist and Workers Parties in Moscow.
