= Joseph Andras =

French writer

Joseph Andras (born 1984) is a French writer who lives in Le Havre.

== Biography ==
In 2016, Joseph Andras published his first novel, De nos frères blessés, dedicated to Fernand Iveton, a "pied-noir" worker and independentist. The book was acclaimed by critics and won the Goncourt Prize for first novel, which the author refused because he didn't approve the institutionalization of writing and the idea of "competition". In May 2017, he released the record-book S'il n'restait qu'un chien, a long poem in free verse about the port of Le Havre.

At the beginning of 2018, he spent nearly two months in Chiapas, staying in one of the five centers of the Zapatista Army of National Liberation and in an indigenous community as part of a Civil Observation Brigade. In September 2018, he published Kanaky. Sur les traces d'Alphonse Dianou, a biographical investigation carried out between 2015 and 2018 in New Caledonia and metropolitan France. The investigation focuses on a socialist, pro-independence activist involved in the FLNKS and killed in 1988 after the assault on the Ouvéa cave. As part of this research, he stayed with the tribe of Gossanah.

On November 20, 2019, he published in L'Humanité an open letter to Manuel T., a "yellow vest" from the North who had been dazed by a grenade attack four days earlier. The same year, he participated in the launch of the international Free Nûdem Durak campaign.

== The Prix Goncourt, first novel, 2016 ==
Initially not included in the list of the prix Goncourt du premier roman 2016, Joseph Andras was finally the winner, on May 9, 2016, with five votes, with four going to Catherine Poulain for Le Grand Marin and one going to Loulou Robert for Bianca, that is - and exceptional fact - two days before its release in bookstores. (Note: However, the novel was available as an electronic book on some sales sites since May 4, 2016.) It is the second Goncourt du premier roman consecutive novel for the editions Actes Sud, what is more about the theme of the Algerian war, after The Meursault Investigation by Kamel Daoud rewarded the previous year.

The week before the official announcement of the results, Andras let it be known, by his publisher and at the private request of the Académie Goncourt, that he refused to go to Paris, thereby signifying his refusal to participate in the selection. Despite this, the Academy awarded him the prize. – Joseph Andras sent a letter to the Académie Goncourt to decline the prize and his endowment, justifying his decision by declaring that "competition, and rivalry were in his eyes notions foreign to writing and creation." This relatively unusual move, (Note: Since 1951 with Julien Gracq who refused the prix Goncourt for Le Rivage des Syrtes, no author ever declined an award from the Académie Goncourt, with the exception of the Émile Ajar/Romain Gary case for La Vie devant soi (1975) which revealed the dual identity and mystification of the same writer a few years later.) led some media to think that he could be an already famous novelist, on the Gary/Ajar model. As a result of these interrogations, Joseph Andras gave interviews to L'Humanité and to the literary supplement of the Beirut daily L'Orient-Le Jour in which he explained his motivations and his work as a novelist to salute the memory of Fernand Iveton and, again, the reasons for his refusal of the prize: "I could not accept it for the sake of consistency, to help "Institutionalize" this narrative and the ideals worn by the characters. [...] I live in Normandy, quietly, I do not know the literary and Parisian environment, do not want to know more and want more than anything to concentrate on my next texts."

Only one photo of him is known. He indicates that he voluntarily keeps away from the mainstream media, preferring to devote himself to literature.

== Work ==
- De nos frères blessés, Actes Sud, 2016 BnF 45065636
  The book retraces the life of the Communist militant Fernand Iveton, who was the only European executed during the Algerian War because of his commitment and his actions to the National Liberation Front (Algeria). It is based on the reference book Pour l’exemple, l’affaire Fernand Iveton by Jean-Luc Einaudi and concludes thus: "These pages could not have been written without the patient investigative work of Jean-Luc Einaudi - be he, although disappeared, thanked here."
