= Jacqueline Guerroudj =

French woman condemned to death(1919-2015)

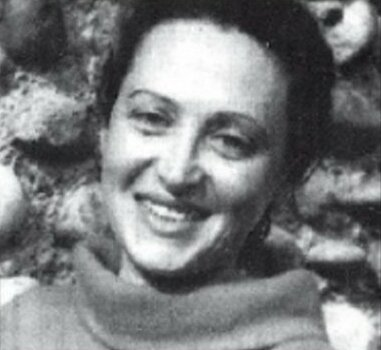
- Born: April 27, 1919
- Died: January 18, 2015 (aged 95)
- Other name: Jacqueline Netter-Minne-Guerroudj
- Spouses: Pierre Minne; Abdelkader Guerroudj

Jacqueline Netter-Minne-Guerroudj (27 April 1919 – 18 January 2015) was a Frenchwoman condemned to death as an accomplice of Fernand Iveton during the Algerian War. She was never executed, partly due to a campaign on her behalf conducted by Simone de Beauvoir.

She was born to a well-off bourgeois family of Alsatian Jews in Rouen in 1919. She arrived in Algeria in 1948 as the wife of Pierre Minne, a professor of philosophy. She remarried in 1950 to Abdelkader Guerroudj (nicknamed "Djilali"), an activist in the FLN. On 4 December 1957 Guerroudj's daughter by her first marriage, Danièle Minne, was sentenced to 7 years in prison by a tribunal for juveniles. Guerroudj died on 18 January 2015 in Algiers, Algeria.

== Biography ==
Jacqueline Netter was born on April 27, 1919 in Rouen, into a wealthy, bourgeois family. Her grandparents were Alsatian-Lorrain Jews who settled in Rouen at the time of the First World War. Her father was an insurance manager and general commissioner of the Rouen Fair and Exhibition. She studied philosophy and law.

She married Pierre Minne, a teacher like herself and a French Communist Party. Their daughter, Danièle Djamila Amrane-Minne, was born in 1939. In 1942, because of her Jewish origins, she was interned by the Nazism. Fortunately, with the help of her husband, communist activists and a priest, she managed to escape to the Zone libre and avoid deportation.

Jacqueline, her husband and their daughter moved to Senegal, where her husband, a civil servant in the French education system, was a philosophy teacher at the Collège de Slane in Tlemcen. They were expelled in 1947 as a result of Pierre's anti-colonial militancy and his organization of Marxist philosophy circles.

In 1948, the Minne family left to teach in Algeria. They settled in the Tlemcen region, first in Chetouane (then Négrier), then in Aïn Fezza where Jacqueline was a primary school teacher. Divorced, Jacqueline Netter remarried in 1950 to Abdelkader Guerroudj, an Algerian Communist Party activist and principal of the school where she taught. In April 1955, Jacqueline and Abdelkader Guerroudj were expelled for their activities. After spending a few months in France, they returned to Algiers and from January 1956 took part in the organization of the Combattants de la libération and Saadi Yacef network. She was arrested on January 4, 1957 for complicity in the failed attempt to plant a non-lethal bomb of Fernand Iveton, the only European moudjahid to be guillotined. She was sentenced to death (like her husband) and imprisoned in Rennes. She and her husband were pardoned, along with Djamila Bouazza and Djamila Bouhired, on March 8, 1962.

She was the oldest of six women sentenced to death for “terrorist” acts during the Algerian war.

== Published works ==
- Des douars et des prisons (in French). Bouchene. 1993. ISBN 9782841090037.

== Bibliography ==
- Dore-Audibert, Andrée (1995). Des Françaises d'Algérie dans la Guerre de libération: des oubliées de l'histoire (in French). KARTHALA Editions. ISBN 978-2-86537-574-5.
- Tidd, Ursula (1999). Simone de Beauvoir, Gender and Testimony. Cambridge University Press. ISBN 978-1-139-42660-2.
