= Baya Hocine =

Algerian rebel

Baya Hocine (born 20 May 1940, in the Casbah of Algiers, died 1 May 2000), also known as Baya Mamadi, was an Algerian independence fighter, and later, a journalist and politician.

== Biography ==
Hocine was born in May 1940, the third child in her family, which originally hailed from Ighil Imoul, after two brothers.

As a teenager she joined the National Liberation Front of Algeria. She went on to become a member of Yacef Saâdi's Zone autonome d'Alger bombing network. On 10 February 1957, during the Battle of Algiers, she carried out bombing raid in Belouizdad and El Biar, killing 9 people and wounding 45.

She was taken prisoner after the raids, and incarcerated in Serkadji Prison by the end of the month. Only 17 years old, she was sentenced to death by the Alger Armed Forces Tribunal. The death sentence was confirmed by the Armed Forces Tribunal of Oran in January 1959. Of the women condemned to death for terrorism during the War of Independence, she was the youngest.

However, she was not executed, remaining imprisoned, before the end of the war in 1962. In the Évian Accords, she was granted amnesty.

After the war, she returned to her studies, becoming a journalist. In the 1977 Algerian legislative election, she was elected to the People's National Assembly, one of 9 women elected. She held her seat until 1982.
