= Union générale des syndicats algériens =

UGSA
- Union générale des syndicats algériens
- Founded: June 1954
- Dissolved: 1957
- Location: Algeria
- Affiliations: World Federation of Trade Unions

The Union générale des syndicats algériens ('General Union of Algerian Trade Unions', abbreviated UGSA) was a communist trade union in Algeria from 1954 to 1957.

== Background ==
UGSA emerged from the Algerian branch of the French CGT. As of 1953, nationalist sectors inside the Algerian CGT had sought to convert the political line of the organization towards Algerian nationalism. They failed to win over the Algerian CGT, but these sectors founded an independent nationalist trade union centre in 1956 (l'Union générale des travailleurs algériens, UGTA). The Algerian CGT reconstituted itself into the UGSA at a congress held June 24–27, 1954, whilst remaining an affiliate organization of the French CGT. At the congress there had been 236 Algerian delegates and 125 Europeans.

== An independent labour centre ==
On July 1, 1956, UGSA severed its links to the metropolitan CGT and became an independent trade union centre. CGT retained an organized presence of its own in Algeria even after the split. Also, some of the UGSA constituent unions retained their affiliations to the metropolitan CGT (particularly those operating in the public sector). Overall, the break with CGT resulted in a collective migration of French workers out of UGSA (some joined other, more moderate, trade unions, some left trade union activism altogether). The independent UGSA became a member of the World Federation of Trade Unions.

== Repression ==
In the fall of 1956 the French authorities withdrew the registration of UGSA. The French government would later explain its decision by stating that UGSA was the labour wing of a political party which "was in armed rebellion against the laws of the French Republic". Several issues of the UGSA organ Travailleur Algérien ('Algerian Worker') were confiscated by the authorities, and the publication was eventually banned.

== Disbanding ==
UGSA rejected the early overtures for a merger into UGTA, as UGSA considered itself to have a wider influence than UGTA. At the time, there was a fierce competition between UGTA and UGSA over hegemony in the Algerian labour movement. Towards the end of 1957, the Algerian communists reconsidered their anti-UGTA stance. After UGTA had participated in the Leipzig congress of the WFTU, the Algerian Communist Party issued a call for trade unionist unity, urging UGSA to dissolve itself and appealed for its members to join UGTA. UGSA complied with this call, and disbanded itself.
