= Boualem Rahal =

Rahal Boualem
- Born: Boualem Rahal; 30 December 1937; Algiers, Algeria
- Died: 20 June 1957; Serkadji prison (Barberousse), Algiers, Algeria
- Other names: "El-Maqnin / المقنين" (popular nickname: "المقنين الزين" / "El meknine ezzine")
- Occupation: Resistance fighter / activist
- Years active: Algerian War (FLN/ALN militant)
- Known for: Participation in the Algerian War of Independence
- Notable work: Recognized as a martyr of the Algerian War (commemorations)

Boualem Rahal (in Arabic: بوعلام رحال), nicknamed El-Maqnin or (in Arabic المقنين الزين), was an Algerian activist in the War of Independence who was executed by the French authorities at Serkadji prison (Barberousse) on 20 June 1957. He is remembered as one of the youngest people executed during the colonial repression during the Battle of Algiers and is the subject of songs and popular tributes.

== Biography ==
Born on 30 December 1937 in Algiers, Boualem Rahal played for Mouloudia Club Algérois (MCA) before joining the national cause.

== Commitment and actions ==
During the urban campaign of Battle of Algiers (1956–1957), Rahal was affiliated with the urban networks of the FLN/ALN. He was notably involved in the attack on the municipal stadium in Algiers on 10 February 1957 (an attack that left several people dead and wounded), in conjunction with other activists active in the city networks. His arrest came during a wave of police and military operations targeting FLN networks in Algiers.

== Arrest, trial, and execution ==
After his arrest — described in the French press and documentation of the time — Boualem Rahal was brought before military or war courts. Contemporary reports mention confessions and information about other members of the network (named in the press at the time). He was sentenced to death and executed by guillotine at the Barberousse (Serkadji) prison at dawn on 20 June 1957. Several commemorative notices specify the time of the executions (between 3:25 and 3:28 a.m.) and mention that he was the youngest of those executed during the Battle of Algiers.

== Falsification of his age ==
The question of Boualem Rahal's age at the time of his execution remains controversial. Several sources claim that he had not yet reached the legal age of majority when the French colonial court sentenced him to death. According to several accounts reported in the press, the colonial administration falsified his identity papers in order to declare him an adult and thus make his execution legally possible.

According to an article published by TRT Arabi, Boualem Rahal, nicknamed El Maknin Zine, was executed despite his young age, with the authorities having changed his age on the records to circumvent the law prohibiting capital punishment for minors. The media outlet *El Ayem* echoes this version, emphasising the young age of the resistance fighter, too young to die but too brave to remain silent. For its part, *Maghreb Voices* speaks of a tragedy of the beautiful bird whose head was cut off by France, describing a hasty execution marred by judicial irregularities. Finally, *UltraAlgeria* points out that this manipulation of documents has become a symbol of colonial injustice, reinforcing the legend of Maknin Zine, a martyr executed before he even reached adulthood.

However, no authenticated contemporary archives (birth certificate, complete judicial file) have been made public to formally confirm this falsification. The debate therefore continues between popular memory and documentary evidence.

== Nickname and popular memory ==
Rahal remained in the Algerian popular memory under the nickname (sometimes transliterated as El meknine ezzine or El-Maqnin Ezzine), a nickname given to him by Mohamed El Badji, who was detained in the same prison. In an interview, he recounts their meeting[6]. He is the subject of popular songs and musical pieces that recount his tragedy and symbolise colonial repression (e.g. contemporary songs and audiovisual reports that refer to يا المقنين الزين).

== Tributes and commemorations ==
Since independence, the memory of those executed in Serkadji has been regularly honoured during commemorations (National Martyrs' Day, gatherings, plaques, references in local place names, television programmes and documentaries). Algerian press articles and reports regularly recall the memory of Boualem Rahal alongside other martyrs guillotined in June 1957. </references>

== Historical critiques and controversies ==
The executions of 1957 and the colonial proceedings were subject to critical analysis after the fact: some historians and legal experts denounced the speed of the proceedings, the conditions of the investigation and, more generally, the use of the death penalty during the Algerian War. Individual cases (including that of Rahal) are often cited in works on repression and colonial memory.
