= Serkadji Prison =

Prison in Algiers, Algeria

Coordinates: 36.7833°N 3.0603°E

- Interactive map of Serkadji Prison
- Location: Algiers, Algeria
- Status: former prison, future national museum
- Opened: 1857
- Closed: 2014

Serkadji Prison, formerly Barberousse Prison, was a high-security prison in Algiers, Algeria; in 1995, about two-thirds of the 1,500 prisoners detained are (or were) accused or convicted of terrorism.

== History ==
The Barberousse Prison was constructed during the period of French rule, being built on the site of a former fortification from the Regency of Algiers period, located above the Casbah of Algiers. During the Algerian War of 1954-62 several hundred FLN activists and fighters were imprisoned there and 58 were executed by guillotine in the main courtyard. The prison was referred to as "Serkadji Prison" by Algerians even during colonization, but was called "Barberousse Prison" by the French and other Europeans until independence. Following Algerian independence there were plans to convert the prison into a historical museum. However under President Houari Boumediène the building resumed its role as a prison for political prisoners plus convicted criminals. Before the program of economic development from 2005 to 2009, the prison systems in Algeria were essentially the same as they had been during the colonial period in Algeria. Before the 2005-2009 period, Algeria had 127 penitentiary establishments classified into prevention, re-education, rehabilitation, specialized centers for women and specialized centers for minors. 76 of the prisons had been built prior to 1962 with 59 of them having been built before 1900. Post-1962, 51 more prisons had been built. This indicates that over half the prisons had been built prior to Algerian independence and had therefore been built with colonial subjugation in mind. 29 of the total penitentiaries were had been built for other purposes but were subsequently converted into prisons. Throughout colonization, Algeria became a site for criminal deportees from other countries, for example the June Insurgents who were from France but served their sentences in Algeria. Equally, Algerians who committed crimes or perpetrated rebellious acts against colonization were sometimes deported to other countries to serve their sentences as they were seen as negative influences on the population. In 2005, Algeria began the process of restructuring its penitentiary system and building new facilities. One of the reasons for this was that the prisons were overcrowded and lacked room for newcomers.

== Architectural Development ==
Before colonization, prisons in Algeria were called "bagnes" as prisoners were put in baths during the night. The architecture of these buildings were characteristic of the Ottoman period with rooms arranged around a central patio. The entry of France into Algeria actually coincided with a period within the prison system in France. Therefore, those new styles of architecture being used in France were used in Algerian prisons as well. Prisons built during the colonial period were constructed in the penal architectural style. Their main focus was preventing escape rather than maximizing the wellbeing of the prisoners. Some of the prisons built are: Bilda (1936,) Ténès (1845,) Tazoult (1852,) Berouaghia (1857) and el Harrach (1910.) Several prisons from the colonial period are still functioning, but others like Serkadji prison are classified as national architectural heritage sites.

Before the main Serkadji prison, 3 others of the same name existed in Algeria:

1. Dar Serkadji el kedima was a prison for Turkish soldiers during the Ottoman period. It was used for torture and hangings primarily.

2. Dar Serkadji was located on today's rue Sallust in Algeria. It was a military prison and a civil prison simultaneously. After 1830 (colonization,) it was reestablished by the French as a military prison.

3. Dar Serkadji el Djedida was used exclusively for janissaries. The Europeans called this prison Barberousse after 1830 because of its location. It became a civil prison and was demolished in 1858 by the French.

When it was first built, Serkadji prison was referred to as the "civil prison of Algiers." The plans for the prison were created by French architects Guiauchain (main architect,) Abel Blouet and Henri Dugat. The prison underwent many architectural developments over the years. It was built in 1846 and, according to documents, was constructed in the shape of a cross. Originally, the prison had a front wing for administration, three wings of cells with walkways in between each wing, a basement for prisoners being punished, a basement for those sentenced to death and a wing for female prisoners in the east wing. In the center of the cross shape was a room for surveillance and the prison's chapel. The first extension to the prison was added in 1856. At this time, two new wings were added as well as two basements and an additional ground floor. One wing was specifically for those in debt, two wings were allotted for additional female prisoners and three infirmary rooms were added in the basement. As the actual floor plans for this extension were not discovered, these additions are essentially a hypothesis made by historians based on other documentation. A second extension occurred in 1937. As the infirmary had proven to be insufficient to house all the sick inmates, a medical block was added to the prison with consultation rooms, quarantine rooms for contagious detainees etc. A third extension took place in 1942. At this time, the number of prisoners was increasing and the prison was overrun. There were additional wings added to compensate for the growing number of inmates. After 1962 and Algerian independence, the prison was set to be turned into a museum. However, this was not the case and the prison remained functional. However, it no longer had a wing for prisoners on death row nor did it house female prisoners any longer. The prison has undergone several additional renovations since independence. After the construction of new prisons, the permanent closure of Serkadji was announced in 2014. It became a museum of national memory. In terms of architecture, Serkadji evolved around two things. It developed and was altered in accordance with the evolution of French and European architecture (due to colonization.) It was also extended and renovated to reflect the needs of the country, whether that be more space for more prisoners or better medical facilities. In this way, it became a sort of reflection of the state of Algeria itself.

== Martyrs of the guillotine ==
The martyrs of guillotine is the name given to the nearly 200 prisoners of war who were beheaded by the French during the Algerian War of Independence, many of whom were at Serkadji Prison.

== Massacre ==
A prison riot took place between 21 and 23 February 1995 at Serkadji Prison. The catalyst to the riot was the alleged attempted escape of 4 prisoners aided by a guard. During the escape attempt, four guards and one prisoner were killed. On the morning of 21 February, a small group attempted to escape, having been given 4 guns and 3 grenades by a recently appointed prison guard, Hamid Mebarki. After killing 4 prison guards before the security forces arrived, which is a fact agreed upon by officials and witnesses, they began opening the cell doors of fellow prisoners. Some prisoners chose to leave their cells and joined a growing riot while others remained in their cells or fled to the courtyards. According to the prisoners who left their cells, the original escapees were wearing masks, making them unidentifiable. During the negotiations between prisoners and prison administration, the prisoners demand lawyers be present. Prisoners demanded they be protected and not punished if they had no involvement in the uprising and the killing of the guards, however the administration rejected this request and terminated the negotiations. At mid-afternoon, the security forces stormed the prison and started shooting. Gunfire and the detonation of grenades continued until about 11 am the next day. Some human rights groups cited claims that the government had executed prisoners after resistance stopped without due process and shot the wounded.

After the failed breakout, security forces killed 96 prisoners (according to official figures; other sources claimed up to 110) while trying to suppress the resulting riot.

=== Controversy ===
Much controversy exists surrounding the exact circumstances under which the deaths of the guards and the prisoners occurred. There is a significant discrepancy between the official accounts provided by the government, the comments made by officials years after the fact, and the accounts of witnesses. From the official account, a small group of prisoners refused to surrender after the deployment of the security forces, took fellow prisoners hostage and used them as human shields against the bullets. This group allegedly killed detainees and threatened to hurt them if they agreed to surrender to the administration. The version of events as told by the prisoners, however, is different. Detainees at the time claim that security forces came in shooting haphazardly and gave prisoners no time to return to their cells or surrender. Equally, they claim that security forces targeted specific individuals to kill and deliberately shot detainees as they fled down corridors and through courtyards. Prisoners were also shot dead in their own cells and while hiding in the cells of others despite not participating in the uprising at all. Prisoners also claimed that names were called out on a list and those that stepped forward were quickly shot. Finally, even after the security forces had regained complete control, prisoners were brutally beaten in their cells, in the cells of others, and in courtyards.

=== ONDH Report ===
The ONDH Report on the events were also called into question as to their legitimacy. This report outlines that the security forces chose not to use tear gas as they did not want to cause asphyxiation among the prisoners who were in enclosed spaces. However, it did not justify why they instead chose to use firearms and grenades, which were obviously much more deadly weapons. ONDH officials agree that only a very small group of prisoners were armed and those that were armed were swiftly executed by snipers that were able to target them successfully. With this in mind, the need to deploy security forces with so many and such deadly weapons is further called into question. There was a huge discrepancy between how armed and protected prisoners were versus guards in this incidence. It appears as if, given this information, a large death toll would have been unsurprising to prison officials. The report equally states that only 12 prisoners were injured compared to 96 dead. This difference is striking and raises questions about the tactics of the security forces. The burial of those killed was another issue that became controversial. The corpses were buried without relatives or next of kin being informed. They were equally buried in graves marked only by "X-Algerian." Relatives of those killed who heard of what had happened often reached out to the prison for information, but received little. No autopsies or post-mortem exams were carried out, which could have revealed the cause of death of each prisoner. In addition to cause, it would have revealed whether the prisoner was killed by weapons carried by the security forces or by the weapons carried by escaped prisoners. It also would have shown how many were killed by grenades or other weapons. As the official claim states that many prisoners were killed by their peers and not security forces, autopsies would have confirmed or denied the legitimacy of these claims. Amnesty International chose to investigate the massacre, but were not permitted to visit the prison itself. They were also not allowed to meet with the Attorney General who had visited the prison after the incident. Amnesty asked several specific questions during their investigation. One was why the bodies were buried so quickly and why the government did not choose to exhume the bodies to examine them more closely. The response of the ONDH was not they already knew they had been shot despite saying in their report that some were also killed by grenades and knives. Another question involved whether or not the bodies were intact and what kinds of injuries they had sustained. The commission originally answered that most had only sustained one bullet wound to the head. When Amnesty International responded that this suggested that the security forces were intentionally killing prisoners in a targeted manner, the ONDH changed their answer to two or three bullet wounds per prisoner. Amnesty International cited the part of the report where the ONDH claimed they had taken pictures of each body, taken their fingerprints and wrote a description of their injuries before burying them. However, neither families nor lawyers nor any human rights organizations had been able to gain access to this documentation. The ONDH commission, according to reports, visited the prison and spoke to detainees. However, they were only able to speak to 10 of them despite there being 1500 prisoners being held there at the time of the massacre. Those 10 prisoners had also been on TV shortly after the events and gave an account identical to that of officials. Many have suggested that the prisoners were coerced or incentivized into testifying, but this has not been proved. It is indubitably odd, however, that the commission did not choose to speak with a larger group than 10 prisoners. Due to suspicions about their dead loved ones' whereabouts, families appealed to the courts to make the list of those killed public and to allow family members to see the dead bodies of their loved ones. Lawyers equally filed motions to have a few questions answered about the unfolding of the massacre. These involved why so many prisoners were transferred to the prison right before the riot, why the guard allegedly involved in supplying the prisoners with weapons had been transferred to the prison so soon before the riot and why some prisoners were incarcerated in a manner incompatible with Algerian code of prisons. Lawyers also questioned why guards were stationed in parts of the prison at the time that they were not trained to be in and why no third-party inspector was allowed into the prison after the massacre.

== Current-day developments ==
No proper inspection has been carried out and the list of victims still has not been made public. No bodies have been exhumed or had a more detailed examination performed upon them. Amnesty International has continuously encouraged the Algerian government to carry out a detailed investigation and to publish the names of the dead.

An inquiry into the incident was conducted in March by an official human rights organization, the Observatoire National des Droits de l'Homme, which supported the Minister of Justice's account. Eight people were later sentenced to death for their parts in the escape attempt.

Today, the prison is a public museum.

== Moroccans detained ==
Three Moroccans belonging to Al-Qaeda in the Islamic Maghreb were arrested in early June 2008, and transferred to Serkadji prison to await trial. Considered foreign elements in security jargon, it was unclear if they would be tried in Morocco or Algeria. Algerian security forces arrested the Salafists after they were successful in penetrating the western borders of Algeria. The three attested to carrying arms against the United States and advocating the overthrow of the pro U.S. monarchy in Morocco.

== See also ==
- Fernand Iveton
- Boualem Rahal
- Ahmed Zabana
- Abderrahmane Taleb
