= Henri Maillot =

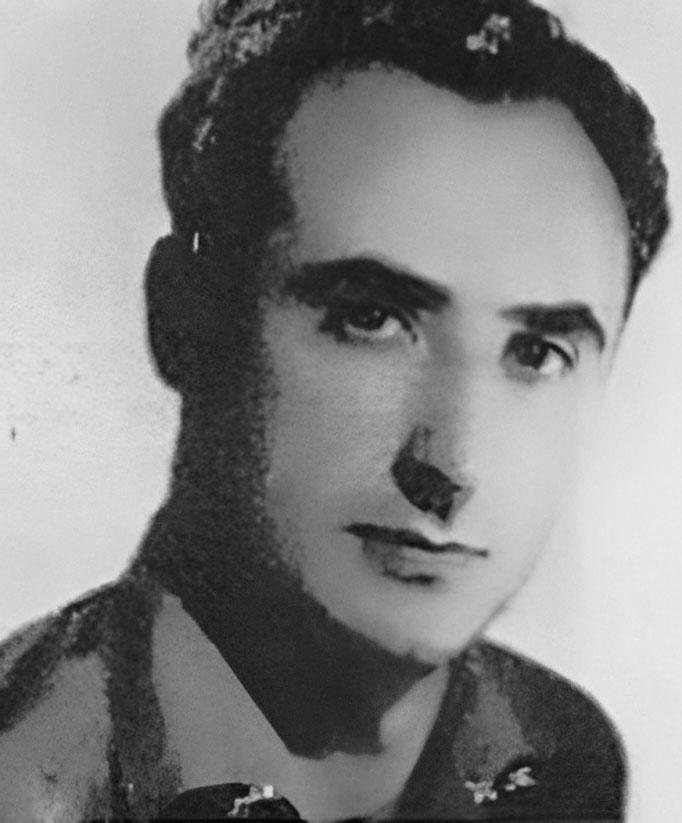
Portrait of the Aspirant Henri Maillot

Henri François Maillot (11 January 1928 in Algiers – 5 June 1956) was a pied-noir member of the Algerian Communist Party and participated in the Algerian War. In 1956, Maillot deserted from his military unit, taking with him an important stock of arms and ammunition for the guerrillas. He was killed in a battle against French forces near Orléansville two months later.

== Biography ==
Born in Algiers, Maillot was the son of a municipal employee who had once been secretary general of the Communist-dominated Municipal Employees' Union. He became secretary-general of the Union de la Jeunesse Démocratique Algérienne, a Communist-front organization, and was employed as an accountant by the Communist daily, Alger Républicain. He also represented Algeria at youth congresses in Prague and Warsaw. However, when he volunteered for active service in the French Army, Maillot had sworn that he had severed all ties with the party. Maillot made his decision to desert to the Algerians after witnessing the Philippeville Massacre.

On April 4, 1956, Maillot commanded a convoy which escorted an army truck loaded with arms and ammunition that left Miliana at dawn and headed for Algiers, seventy-four miles to the northeast. The truck arrived a little before 9:00 AM. When the men of the escort went to breakfast, Maillot climbed into the cab of the truck and ordered the driver, Private Jacques Domergue, to drive to a wood at Bainem just west of the city. When the vehicle was later recovered, Domergue was found tied to a tree but Maillot had disappeared and, with him, the cargo of light machine guns, rifles, pistols, and a stock of hand grenades. Two days later, a statement issued by the Combattants de la Libération (Freedom Fighters), the Communist guerrilla organization, announced that Maillot had joined the "resistance forces"; it also contained a list of the stolen weapons. On May 18, Maillot himself sent a mimeographed statement to his former comrades in the 504th Transport Battalion, to the police, and to the press. In it, he explained that in joining the ranks of the "fighting Algerians," he had responded to his party's call—the underground Communist paper, Liberté, had ordered party members to "procure in every possible way arms for the forces engaged in the struggle for the liberation of Algeria".

The main newspaper in Algiers, L'Echo d'Alger declared that this was "new proof of the collusion between the Communist Party and the terrorists". Maillot was tried in absentia on May 22, 1956, by a tribunal which sentenced him to death.

On June 5, 1956, an armed band was sighted near Lamartine, east of Orléansville, an area which had not previously contained guerillas. The group was pursued by a security unit and was attacked outside the Muslim village of Boudouane. Seven members of the group were killed, among them two pied-noir. When the henna-dyed hair and eyebrows of one of these were dyed black, he was recognized as Henri Maillot. The other pied-noir was Maurice Laban, a founding member of the Algerian Communist Party who was born at Biskra and was a veteran of the Spanish Civil War.

In 2002, Algerian President Abdelaziz Bouteflika inaugurated a Stele in his memory.
