= For a Yellow Jersey =

- VHS cover
- French: ...pour un maillot jaune
- Directed by: Claude Lelouch
- Cinematography: Claude Lelouch; Patrice Pouget
- Edited by: Claude Barrois
- Release date: 1965
- Running time: 20 minutes
- Country: France
- Language: French

For a Yellow Jersey (French: ...pour un maillot jaune) is a French 1965 documentary – described as a cinematic tribute – about the 1965 Tour de France. It was made by the French film director, Claude Lelouch. Lelouch is best known as the director of Un Homme et Une Femme (A Man and a Woman in English) in 1966.

== Synopsis ==
The film follows the 1965 Tour de France not as a sports documentary but an atmospheric film of the events that surround it. Where riders are shown racing, it is an illustration of the hardship or the danger they face. The main events are the daily routines of the competitors, the bossing about of spectators by officials (which Lelouch emphasises by adding animal noises to the soundtrack), the monotonous days of journalists who follow the race for hours to write only a few hundred words, and the evening entertainment laid on by the Europe-1 radio station.

The film starts with a scene of riders arriving at the start by train and then of race organisers Jacques Goddet and Félix Lévitan and an anonymous man with a cigarette in his mouth supervising the cutting of a blue, white and red ribbon across the road as a band plays the Marseillaise, the French national anthem. The film then jumps – as it does throughout its 30 minutes – to an open-air mass for riders wearing their race clothes.

There are dramatic shots of riders climbing mountains, often with breathtaking views, a struggle which Lelouch emphasises by slowly fading down the heartbeat-like music to near silence, stressing each rider's lone and silent battle with himself. In more light-hearted scenes, the team manager Raphael Géminiani is shown angrily realising he has been filmed while he has been asleep, and the soigneur Louis Guerlacher is shown kneading a rider's muscles as though they were soggy baguettes.

== The technique ==
Unlike Vive Le Tour, an earlier film by Louis Malle and with which Pour Un Maillot Jaune is inevitably associated, Claude Lelouch uses no narrator and depends on the film to tell its own story. He portrays the spirit of the moment with repeated musical themes, some of them not always perfectly edited. Only occasionally does the sound of the moment reach the screen and in one scene, when riders are descending at speed from a mountain, Lelouch has made the error of adding the sound of squealing brakes that would never have happened in real life.

Throughout, the film jumps from colour to black and white and back.

== The race ==
The 1965 Tour de France was won by a young Italian called Felice Gimondi, riding only as a late inclusion. The French had hoped that the winner would be Raymond Poulidor relieved for once of riding against Jacques Anquetil who had always beaten him. By the Chartreuse, however, Gimondi was unbeatable and even attacked Poulidor and left him behind "just to show Raymond that I could go faster and that I was the better man."

The film ends as Gimondi takes his lap of honour at the Parc des Princes Paris.

The charm of the film to cycling enthusiasts is to see the Tour de France as it was four decades ago, when the winners stood on rickety podiums of scaffolding poles, slept in bad hotels and retrieved a spanner from their pockets to change the height of their handlebars as they rode.
