= Amar Ouzegane =

Algerian politician

Amar Ouzegane (Tamaziɣt: ⵄⴻⵎⵎⴰⵕ ⵓⵣⴻⴳⴳⴰⵏ; Arabic: عمار أوزقان; 7 March 1910 in Algiers – 5 March 1981 in Algiers) was an Algerian politician. Ouzegane became a leader of the Algerian Communist Party, but later broke with the party and became a nationalist. After independence, he served as a Minister.

== Biography ==
Ouzagane came from a family of Kabylean peasants who had lost their possessions after the 1871 insurrection against the French. He studied in a Quranic school, and later went on to get a French education. He sold newspapers, and later got a job at the Post. He joined the Communist Youth in 1930. In the same year he became a member of the Algiers committee of the trade union movement Confédération générale du travail unitaire. In 1934 he became secretary of the Algiers branch of the French Communist Party. Moreover, he was appointed second in command of the Communist Youth in Algiers, but in reality (as the Algiers First Secretary Ben Ali Boukort was imprisoned) he led the organization.

In 1935 Ouzegane led the Algerian delegation to the Seventh Congress of the Communist International.

Ouzegane was fired from his job at the Post, as a result of his political activities. Afterwards he became a party whole-timer. When the Algerian Communist Party was banned in 1940, Ouzegane went underground. In April 1940 he was arrested. He was jailed in southern Algeria until 1943.

After being released from jail, he re-entered the Communist Party leadership and was included in the party secretariat. In 1944 he became First Secretary of the party. He headed the list launched by the Algerian Communist Party in the 1945 French Constituent Assembly election for the Muslim non-citizens constituency in the Algiers department. The list received 82,285 votes (34.9%) and won one seat (Ouzegane). In the Constituent Assembly he was included in the Interior, Algeria and General, Department and Municipal Administration Commission and in the Finances and Budget Control Commission.

In 1947 he was expelled from the Communist Party, accused of 'nationalism'. After his expulsion from the party, he associated himself with the Algerian national movement. He became a member of the Coordination and Executive Council of the National Liberation Front (FLN), a socialist political party in Algeria, representing the Algiers zone. Ouzegane was the main architect behind the FLN programme (the Soummam platform) adopted in 1956. He was jailed in April 1958, and remained in prison until October 1962 when hostilities with the French ended.

In 1962 Ouzegane published the work Le meilleur combat ('The Better Struggle'), written during his incarceration in the Fresnes Prison. Le meilleur combat is a detailed review of his break with communism and adoption of a nationalist political line. Ouzegane argued in favour of fusing socialist and Islamic thinking, stating that

...the incompatibility of Islam and socialism is a false image of Marxist theory. Their coexistence reflects a socio-economic reality and expresses a certain relationship of forces within the underdeveloped countries. ... We need a new kind of jihad to achieve the Algerian revolution, the triumph of national democracy, the conquest of social justice.

After independence, he became a member of the first Algerian National Assembly and became Minister for Agriculture and Land Reforms in the first Algerian government. He later held other Minister of State positions in subsequent Algerian governments.
