= Algerian Communist Party =

Communist party in Algeria

- French name: Parti Communiste Algérien
- Arabic name: الحزب الشيوعي الجزائري
- Abbreviation: PCA
- General Secretary: Ben Ali Boukort
- Founded: 1920 as an extension of the French Communist Party; 1936 as an independent party
- Dissolved: 1965
- Split from: PCF
- Headquarters: Algiers
- Ideology: Communism; Marxism-Leninism; Algerian nationalism; Anticolonialism
- Political position: Far-left
- International affiliation: Comintern (1919-1943)
- Slogan: "Bread, Peace, Liberty" ("Pain, Paix, Liberté")

The Algerian Communist Party (French: Parti Communiste Algérien; Arabic: الحزب الشيوعي الجزائري) was a Marxist-Leninist party in Algeria. The PCA emerged in 1920 as an extension of the French Communist Party (PCF) and eventually became a separate entity in 1936. Despite this, it was recognized by the Comintern in 1935. Its first congress was in Algiers in July 1936, also the site of the PCA's headquarters.

In the post-war period, it gained substantially in influence, increasing from around 3000 members in 1939 to between 12,000 and 15,000 members in 1948.

In September 1955 the PCA was banned by the French administration due to the ongoing violence of the Algerian War, but remained an active part within the independence movement and many of its members participated as part of the National Liberation Army (ALN).

By the end of the Algerian War, the PCA had been severely organizationally damaged; many of its leadership had been killed or arrested and its decision to subsume large parts of its membership within the ALN reduced its influence significantly. The PCA re-obtained legal status following independence in 1962, but was banned and dissolved later that year by the National Liberation Front. The Algerian communists later regrouped in groups such as the Socialist Vanguard Party (PAGS).

The general secretaries of PCA were Ben Ali Boukort from 1936 to 1939, Amar Ouzegane during the period of the underground central committee, Larbi Bouhali from 1947 to 1949, and Bachir Hadj Ali from 1949.

== History ==
=== The PCA's early days (1920-1936) ===
The PCA, from the beginning, lacked a coherent approach to the Algerian situation and its relationship with both France and its main body in the PCF. Part of this was due to the disproportionate concentration of Pieds-Noirs in the urban centers of Algeria, and thus the numbers of Pieds-Noirs in the party, given its focus on urban organisation. The linguistic composition of Algeria also played into the difficulties of the PCA's organisational capacities as communist ideas, proliferated widely in French, had difficulty crossing the language barrier to the predominantly Arabic speaking, Islamic Algerian population. During the First World War male Pieds-Noirs had emigrated to France to assist in the fight on the Western front, leaving a bulk of Algeria's proletariat outside of the country and creating difficult for communist in Algeria given the traditional focus within Marxism on the urban proletariat.

The party was, throughout its existence, more popular with Europeans living in Algeria than Algerians themselves. This ethnic divide was worsened by the Code de l'indigenat which excluded non-French citizens in Algeria from joining the PCA. Despite this, some Muslims were attracted to the PCA, for example: Ben Ali Boukort, Ahmed Akkache and the general secretary Bachir Hadj Ali. During this period, the party did emphasize a demand for Algerian independence, though this invariably resulted in harsh repression and, consequently, a diminished size and reduced organisational capacity.

However, throughout the 1920s the PCA struggled to maintain an organisational foothold in Algeria, and by the late 1920s the Algerian arm of the PCF was seemingly moribund.

=== The PCA before and during the Second World War (1936-1945) ===
In the 1930s the PCA began to gain influence again after the failure in proliferating its message in the 1920s. Recognizing the weakness in attempting to administer the Algerian section of the PCF from France, the PCA was officially launched as a distinct organisation on 17–18 October 1936. The 1930s saw both a growth in the PCA's importance and marked the advent of some of its tactical mistakes in gaining public support. Particularly important to this period was the developing international events and the communist movement's wider position on it (in particular, the attitude of the Comintern and the guidance it was giving to communist parties on priorities).

During the 1930s, the party was left in disarray due to continued French repression in Algeria, as many of its leading figures were subject to arrest and police surveillance. The spread of fascism in 1930s Europe led to the Comintern switching emphasis away from supporting anti-colonial struggles to advocating for "popular front" strategies with all liberal parties to resist fascism. The Spanish Civil War, beginning in 1936, was particularly important for this switch in the PCA's position, and the increasing propagation of Spanish fascist propaganda to Northern Africa prompted the PCA to de-emphasize its anti-colonialist position so as not to weaken the efforts of the PCF in France in constructing a popular front against domestic fascism.

During this time, the PCA also faced increasing competition from Messali Hadj's Algerian People's Party (PPA), which it saw as competing for a similar base of political support in the radicalised Algerian masses. Though the PCA performed well in Algiers' local elections of 1937, thereafter its voter base steadily began to switch to supporting the PPA, who began to capitalise on the PCF's equivocation over the issue of independence. The PCF exerted pressure upon the PCA during this time to support PCF General Secretary Maurice Thorez's 'nation in formation' thesis which argued that Algeria was a 'nation in formation', at the early stages of its development, and thus unsuited to separation from the French nation it naturally belonged to. Whilst many members of the PCA, particularly Islamic members, rejected this thesis, it influenced PCA organizational slogans and theory, and contributed to the notion that France's communist revolution would have to occur before Algeria's. This continued boosting the PPA's popularity with an Arabic population in Algeria, who felt the PCA was increasingly subordinated to the concerns of Pieds-Noirs in the industrial centers and their preoccupation with European affairs.

Following the Nazi invasion of Poland beginning 1 September 1939, and France's declaration of war on Nazi Germany, the PCA, along with numerous other Algerian political parties and organisations, faced severe repression by the French authorities. On 26 September 1939 the French government banned both the domestic PCF, the PCA and Messali Hadj's PPA on the ground of national security, and by November it had granted itself powers to arrest any individual seen to threaten national security, severely hindering the actions of the PCA. On top of this, the Molotov–Ribbentrop Pact threw the entire international communist movement into confusion, given the sudden switch from the previous emphasis on anti-fascism forced upon it by the Soviet Union through the Comintern.

As the war progressed the influence of the PCF intensified and the PCA became increasingly preoccupied with the events in Europe, continuing to alienate the Algerian population and precluding stronger alliances with Algerian nationalist movements such as the PPA and Friends of the Manifesto and Liberty (AML). Though the PCA continued to grow in popularity - doubling in membership between 1939 and 1944 - the growth in membership and popularity continued to be concentrated among European populations. Towards the end of the war, the PCA's hostility towards the US contrasted with the warmth many Algerians felt towards America in light of the Atlantic Charter of 1941, which lent legitimacy to the nationalist aim of independence. The PCA continued to lend its support to Charles de Gaulle and participate in his alternative government headquartered in Algiers. Following violence against Algerian nationalists during what came to be known as the Sétif and Guelma massacre in May and June 1945, the PCA condemned the nationalist side as "hiterlite" provocateurs. All this continued to alienate the Algerian masses who saw the PCA as supporting the French colonial administration in Algeria, and solidified the national/ethnic division between the European minority and the Algerian majority.

=== The PCA between World War 2 and the Algerian War (1945-1954) ===
Following the end of the Second World War and the dissolution of the Comintern in 1943 the PCA was given more autonomy on its approach to Algerian politics, allowing it to re-focus on the Algerian nationalist struggle without fear of weakening the PCF's struggle against fascism in France. Despite this, the party initially remained committed to campaigning for democratic liberties within a French framework, rather than for Algerian independence.

Towards the end of the 1940s, and due to its failure in the June elections of the National Assembly elections of 1946, the PCA began recognising the need to widen its appeal to a non-European base through advocating for Algerian nationalism. The party began releasing publications and conducting meetings in Arabic to widen its appeal, and attempted to forge closer links with nationalist movements such as the Democratic Union of the Algerian Manifesto (UDMA). The party's appeal increased substantially with Algerians, particularly young intellectuals in the urban centers who favored the more class-based analysis of the PCA, and by 1948 it had between 12,000 and 15,000 members. Despite this, efforts at unity with nationalist parties often stalled due to nationalist distrust of the PCA in light of its condemnation of Algerian nationalists in the wake of the Sétif and Guelma massacres in 1945.

By 1949, the PCA had significantly increased its base among the Algerian population, leading it to firmly announce its support for an Algerian Republic at its fifth congress in May 1949. Support for Algerian nationalist movements such as the Special Organisation (SO) finally began to be reciprocated, and in July 1951 the PCA, UDMA, Movement for the Triumph of Democratic Liberties (MTLD) and the 'ulama united in the form of the Algerian Front. This unity, however, proved short-lived, as disagreements over strategies frustrated cooperation between the nationalist movements and the PCA. During 1952 and 1953 efforts to cultivate a united front continued, and in late 1953 the MTLD and PCA announced an intention to form a new united front, though this endeavour was hindered by increasing factionalism within the MTLD between supports and opponents of Messali Hadj. By the advent of the Algerian War, the PCA had grown substantially in support, though increasingly found itself torn between its commitment to non-violence on the one hand, and its extensive coverage, through its publication Liberté, on the success of Vietnamese anti-colonial guerillas against France during the First Indochina War on the other.

=== The PCA during the Algerian War (1954–1962) ===
As a result of their focus on non-violent struggle, the attacks orchestrated by the National Liberation Front (FLN) in November 1954 took the PCA, like most of Algerian society, by surprise. Sticking to its focus on non-violent struggle, and pressured by its pacifist-leaning European members, it released an obscure statement on 2 November condemning violence, though whether this was directed at the perpetrators or the French administration's response to the attacks was not clear. In private, the PCA did begin supplying the newly formed FLN with arms, despite outwardly adopting a position of deliberate ambiguity so as to ensure it was given room by the French colonial administration to continue organizing publicly. In 1955, the central committee decided to wholly commit itself to the Algerian War. Despite this, the PCA suffered immensely from government repression, given its position as the most widely known radical group (the FLN was still relatively obscure in the early years of the Algerian War). Key leaders of the movement were either arrested or, in cases such as that of Henri Maillot, killed by the French army. The PCA, whilst initially reluctant to join the FLN for fear of becoming subsumed in a wider, non-communist movement, agreed to combine its military wing - the Combattants de la Libération (CDL) - with the FLN's National Liberation Army (ALN) (though it insisted on remaining politically separate). Importantly, the FLN insisted on marginalizing possible communist influence on its power and maintain support from non-communist countries such as the US by keeping this collaboration private. The FLN viewed the alliance with the PCA as strictly pragmatic, keenly aware of the differences between its own prioritization of the peasant struggle and the PCA's belief in proletarian vanguardism.

Over the course of the late 1950s, the PCA was disproportionately targeted by French authorities due to the fear of communist influence in the context of the Cold War, and was often held accountable for FLN orchestrated attacks during the Battle of Algiers. Despite having subsumed itself militarily within the ALN, the PCA began objecting to the FLN's increasing focus on military struggle and neglect of political organisation. Though agreeing to an alliance with the PCA out of necessity, the FLN remained distrustful of any communist influence within the movement and began speaking more openly about its intention to "liquidate" communist elements following independence, favoring a one party system over the PCA's endorsement of a pluralist, multi-party democracy. By the end of the war in 1962 the PCA was organizationally still intact but had diminished significantly in membership due to its effective merger with the FLN.

=== The PCA after the Algerian War (1962–1966) ===
Following the end of the Algerian War, the PCA began agitating openly again, capitalizing on the absence of rival newspapers to extend the popularity of its publications Alger républicain and El-Hourriya. After the cessation of hostilities with the French army, the FLN's hostility to communism was free to bubble to the surface and in November 1962 the PCA was banned by the FLN. In 1963 the FLN was proclaimed the sole legal party through a constitutional referendum, and in 1964 the FLN took control over the PCA paper Alger républicain. Though the PCA continued to operate underground and continued to launch (unsuccessful) communist and socialist groups, its influence continued to decline, particularly after the military coup of Houari Boumediene in 1965, and it would never recover the influence it once commanded.

== Relation with the FLN ==
During the Algerian War, the PCA initially operated independently through the creation of its own combatant units called Combattants de la Libération (CDL). However, due to intense repression by the French authorities and a heavy blow against these units in June 1956, the PCA and the FLN agreed on the integration of the CDL into the National Liberation Army (ALN), separating it from the political wing of the PCA which remained in Algiers. The FLN's preclusion of inner debate by communists severely restricted the PCA's influence, as many members were forced to put aside communist agitation for FLN activities. By 1962, however, the PCA reemerged as a key force in Algerian politics, controlling one of the few Algerian newspapers which had survived the Algerian War intact. However, FLN repression soon followed to quash possible rivals, solidified in Ben Bella's constitutional referendum of 1963 declaring the FLN as the only legal party. At 1965 some of the leaders of the PCA, with the left wing of the FLN created an organization to combat the military coup of Boumediene, the Organization de la résistance populaire (OPR).

== Relation with other Communist Parties ==
=== Relation with the French Communist Party (PCF) ===
The PCA and French Communist Party (PCF) shared a close link throughout the PCA's existence, and much of early PCA policy was dictated by the demands of the PCF. The PCA came into existence in 1920 as an Algerian section of the PCF, but in 1936 was granted autonomy and became an independent party. The PCF, for a large part of the PCA's existence, placed an emphasis on Maurice Thorez's "nation in formation" thesis, which rejected Algerian nationalism and compelled the PCA to focus on unity with France rather than joining calls for Algerian independence. This was largely due to Soviet influence in viewing opposition to the US as paramount and all other concerns secondary.

During the 1930s, the PCA was still largely subordinated to the political situation of the French communists, and this severely impacted its appeal to Algerian members, who felt marginalized in a party concerned primarily with anti-fascism in Europe. Despite the Comintern outwardly supporting anti-imperialism, the PCA's ties to it - until its dissolution in 1943 - also meant the PCA's program was often being designed in support of Soviet aims, rather than Algerian ones. During the 1930s, the PCA was forced, along with the PCF, to support "popular front" aims and therefore reduce the emphasis on Algerian independence to avoid weakening the anti-fascist alliance in France. With the advent of war in 1939, France banned both the PCA and the PCF on the grounds of national security.

Following the dissolution of the Comintern and the collapse of fascism in Europe, the PCA was given more autonomy from both the Soviet Union and the PCF, and thus renewed its focus on Algerian nationalism.. In November 1954, following the outbreak of the Algerian insurrection, the PCF reaffirmed its support for Algerian independence. From 1954 to 1956, it supported strike actions led by the CGT as well as the movement organized by the Young Communists in which young conscripts refused to join the French army; the first such case was that of Alban Liechti in July 1956. Several French communist activists took part in solidarity actions supporting Algerian communists, notably following the 1957 assassination of Maurice Audin (a PCA activist) and the sentencing to death that same year of Fernand Iveton, an Algerian communist of European origin. On February 8, 1962, nine French communist activists were killed by the French police at the Charonne metro station in Paris following a demonstration against the Algerian War and the OAS. According to historian Alain Ruscio, more than 250 French and Algerian communist activists were killed during the Algerian War for their pro-independence activities.

=== Relations with the Communist Party of the Soviet Union (CPSU) ===
The CPSU commanded significant influence over the PCA's policy program through the Comintern, particularly in the 1930s due to concerns over maintaining alliances with non-communist countries in Europe in order to repel fascism. Relations with the Soviet Union were initially defined as the PCA's membership of the Comintern. The CPSU also provided support for the PCA's war effort through provision of aid. However, during the course of the Algerian War, the Soviet Union began to turn its allegiance away from the PCA towards the National Liberation Front (FLN). The CPSU was more hesitant than the Chinese Communist Party (CCP) in describing the FLN as a socialist party, but still began to support both it and the Provisional Government of Algeria (GPRA) towards the end of the Algerian War as part of its strategy to shift the global balance of power between the socialist bloc and the West.

The CPSU criticized the FLN's later banning of the PCA as a blatant attempt to appeal to Western nations keen to prevent communist influence in newly liberated colonies.

=== Relations with the Chinese Communist Party (CCP) ===
The CCP had a fractious relationship with the PCF, and thus the PCA due to its strong organizational links with the former. During the Algerian War, the CCP prioritized aid to the FLN, viewing the anti-colonial and anti-imperial struggle as of paramount importance. The Sino-Soviet split also caused tension between the PCA and CCP as the former lined up with the Soviet Union in the split, with the latter being favored by the FLN. Indeed, the CCP's preference for the FLN over the PCA led to Chairman Mao speaking of both the French and Algerian communists as having a hatred for the CCP. China continued to prioritize close relations with the FLN after the Algerian War, extolling the party as not only a party fighting 'against imperialism and feudalism', but also as a party practicing socialism proper.

== Notable members of the PCA ==
- Henri Alleg
- Alice Sportisse Gomez-Nadal
- Baya Jurquet
- Henri Maillot
- Kateb Yacine

== Bibliography ==
- Chiviges Naylor, P., Andrew Heggoy, A. Historical Dictionary of Algeria. Second Edition. 1994. The Scarecow Press Inc. Metuchen, N.J., & London. ISBN 0810827484 Consulted 15 March 2017.
- Rahal, M. Impossible Opposition: The Magic of the One-Party Regime. 2013. Jadaliyya. Consulted 17 March 2017. Available Online: http://www.jadaliyya.com/pages/index/14890/impossible-opposition_the-magic-of-the-one-party-r
- Drew, A. We are no longer in France. Communists in colonial Algeria. 2014. Manchester University Press. ISBN 9780719090240 Consulted 18 March 2023.
