= Khouya =

- Directed by: Yanis Koussim
- Screenplay by: Yanis Koussim
- Produced by: M. D. CINE
- Starring: Sonia Samia Mezina Anya Louanchi Salima Abada Nabil Asli
- Cinematography: Jean-Marie Delorme
- Edited by: Pauline Dairou
- Release date: 2010
- Running time: 16'
- Countries: Algeria; France

Khouya is a 2010 film.

== Synopsis ==
Within the anonymity of a normal Algerian home, Yamina, Nabila and Imen are regularly beaten by their brother, Tarek. Their mother, a witness to their brother's violent behavior, does nothing to end the drama suffered by her daughters. Khouya is the story of a drama that takes place behind closed doors and that will soon evolve into a tragedy. After Khti (My Sister), Kouya (My Brother) is the second part of the trilogy "Algerian women" created by Yanis Koussim.

== Awards ==
- Locarno 2010
- Amiens 2010
