= Samira TV =

Algerian cooking television channel

- Country: Algeria
- Broadcast area: Maghreb; Middle East; France
- Headquarters: Algiers, Algeria

Programming
- Language(s): Algerian arabic
- Picture format: 1080i (16:9 SDTV)

Ownership
- Owner: Samira Bezaouia

History
- Launched: 1 July 2013; 11 years ago

Samira TV is an Algerian television channel specialising in cooking shows, focusing on Algerian cuisine.

The channel was founded in 2013 by Samira Bezouaia, the editor-in-chief of Samira Magazine and her husband Yacine Sadek. Since then, the channel has become one of the most viewed in Algeria, and was the most popular television channel among Algerian women as of 2020. Samira TV's creative and administrative activities have been split between Bezouaia and Sadek, with Bezouaia overseeing the former and Sadek the latter.

== History ==
Samira TV was created in 2013 by Samira Bezouaia, the editor-in-chief of Samira Magazine, and her husband Yacine Sadek. Featuring food and sewing content, Samira TV was rare for a television channel in Algeria in targeting a female audience. For advertisers, this was viewed as a valuable means of accessing housewives, who are responsible for most household purchases in Algeria. As Bezouaia lacked previous experience in producing audiovisual media, she received help from Mohamed Oukaci, a specialist in TV production. The channel hired chefs from within Algeria and internationally, including from countries such as China, Syria and Lebanon.

By 2020, Bezouaia occupied multiple production roles beyond her official position of production director, including partaking in some responsibilities of artistic director, editorial work and production designer. A profile that year in Jeune Afrique described Bezouaia as working as many as 14 hours a day. The piece characterized Bezouaia as a low-profile figure, unknown by the channel's viewers. Sadek at this time oversaw the channel's administrative matters.

== Viewership ==
As of 2016, Samira TV was one of the most popular channels in Algeria, being viewed by 35.1% of households in a seven day survey period, third overall in the category. In response to its popularity, competitor Echorouk TV relaunched its food channel, Bena TV. Its popularity, and the popularity of food channels more generally, occupied an audience segment who had previously mostly consumed Turkish soap operas. By 2020, the channel was watched by around 9 million viewers a week, making it the most popular channel among Algerian women. The channel was also broadcast in Morocco and Tunisia. The channel has a reputation for having attractive set design and a consistent visual aesthetic.

== Content ==
TV programs have included El Najm Errabeh, a self-help reality TV show and Qaadatna Djazairia, a talk show that released episodes daily during Ramadan, covering Algerian culture in a positive light. The set design for Qaadatna Djazairia was relatively costly for the channel and was inspired by the Casbah of Algiers.

Beyond television content, Samira TV has released cookbooks.
