= Women of Algiers in Their Apartment (novel) =

1980 novel

Women of Algiers in their Apartment
- First edition (French)
- Author: Assia Djebar
- Original title: Femmes d'Alger dans leur appartement
- Translator: Marjolijn de Jager
- Language: French
- Publication date: 1980
- English publication date: 1992
- Media type: Print

Women of Algiers in Their Apartment French: Femmes d'Alger dans leur Appartement is a 1980 novel by the Algerian writer Assia Djebar. It is a collection of short stories celebrating the strength and dignity of Algerian women of the past and the present. It interweaves the stories of the lives of three Muslim Algerian women. Assia Djebar's inspiration to write Femmes d'Alger dans leur appartement came from Delacroix's painting The Women of Algiers.

== Plot ==
The book is a collection of short stories about the lives of pre-colonial, colonial, and postcolonial women at various levels of Algerian society. It is a work about the compartmentalization of women in Algeria and the "harems"—social, economic, symbolic, into which they are placed.
