= Georges Gasté =

French artist (1869–1910)

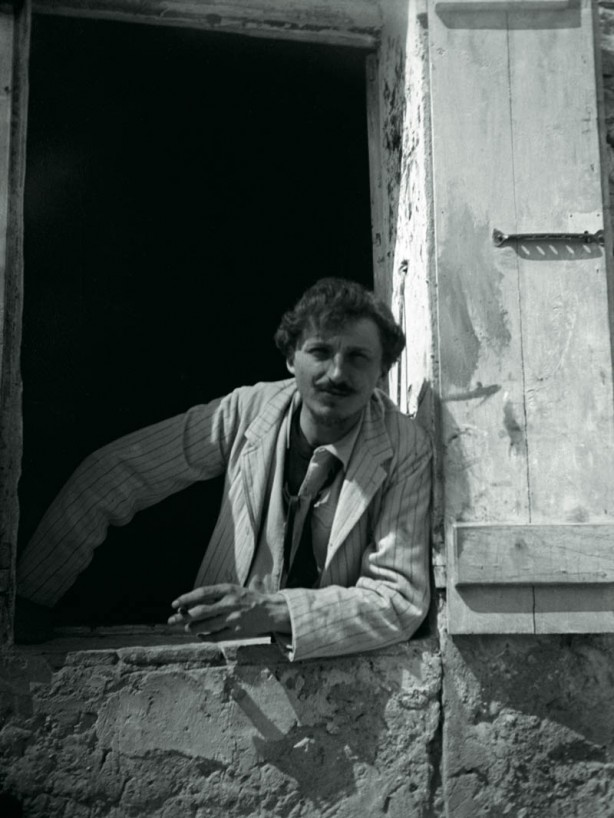
- Georges Gasté in 1908
- Born: Constant Georges Gasté; 30 August 1869; Paris, France
- Died: 12 September 1910 (aged 41); Madurai, India
- Education: Atelier Colarossi, Ecole des Beaux Arts in the studio of Alexandre Cabanel
- Known for: Painter, photographer
- Movement: Orientalist

Georges Gasté (August 30, 1869, in Paris – in 1910 in Madurai, India) is a French Orientalist painter and photographer.

== Biography ==
Born Constant Georges Gasté on August 30, 1869, at 3, rue du Gindre in the 6th borough of Paris, he was born into a great painting family. His father, Henry Gasté (1845-1871), a native of Laval, was an art dealer, and was the son of Pierre Gasté (1820-1884) (Georges Gasté's grandfather) who is also an art dealer himself. He received his early art education at the Atelier Colarossi and at age 18 he enrolled at the Ecole des Beaux Arts at the Alexandre Cabanel Studio.

On a visit to Morocco, Algeria and Palestine in 1892, he marvelled at the quality of light he observed there. After this, he made the conscious decision to become an Orientalist artist. In 1893, the French Orientalist, Nasreddine Dinet noticed his work and invited him to stay at Bou Saâda in southern Algeria, where Dinet and a small group of French painters had set up an artists' colony. Fascinated by the local inhabitants, he found inspiration for his paintings, producing many portraits of them. For five years, between 1892 and 1898, he travelled across North Africa, visiting Algeria and Egypt. In 1907 he settled in Cairo. During this period, he rarely returned to his native France.

Eager to discover new horizons, Gasté sailed for India, which for him became a new source of inspiration for his paintings. In 1905, he settled in settled in Agra, the city of the Taj Mahal, in northern India. During this period, he travelled to Venice and then to Constantinople, before returning to India in 1907 and settling in Madurai. India was a major source of inspiration and there he took many photographs and executed many paintings and watercolours. This was to be the most productive period of his career.

In 1907, he was appointed as the official correspondent of the Orientalist Painters’ Society in India. In 1909, he was given rare permission to spend six months inside the great temple of Madurai. From this privilege, he produced several works, including: Le Bain des Brahmines, now in the collection of the Orsay Museum. He became known as the painter of India.

He died, at his studio in Madurai, India from an illness on 12 September 1910.

In 2013, an exhibition entitled Georges Gasté, un Orient d’ombre et de lumière (literally "Georges Gasté, an East[ern place made up] of light and shadow"), an exhibition that has been dedicated to the Montparnasse museum in Paris.

== Work ==
His paintings of the Orient are noted for the authenticity, warmth and emotion. In 1913, he was acknowledged posthumously as the "Indies painter."

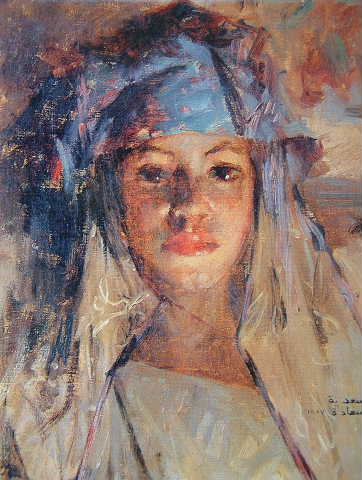
Woman of Bou Saâda, Algeria, date unknown

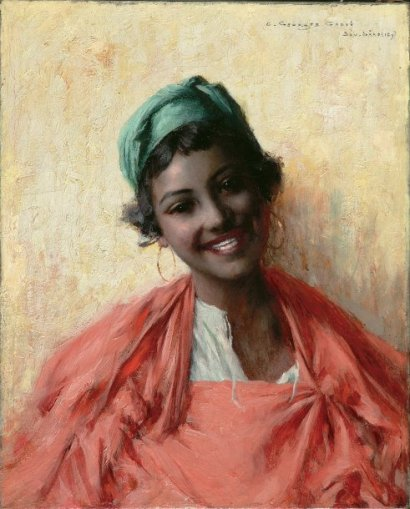
A young woman from Bou Saâda, Algeria, date unknown

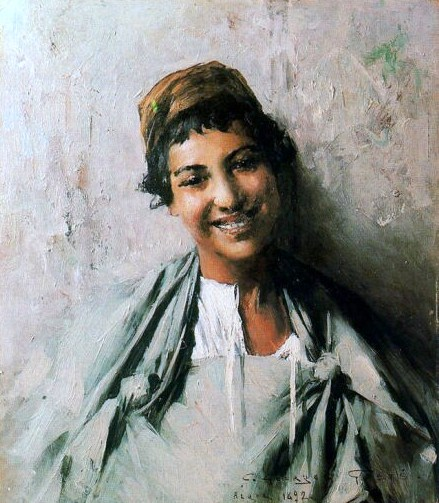
Smiling woman from Bou Saâda, date unknown

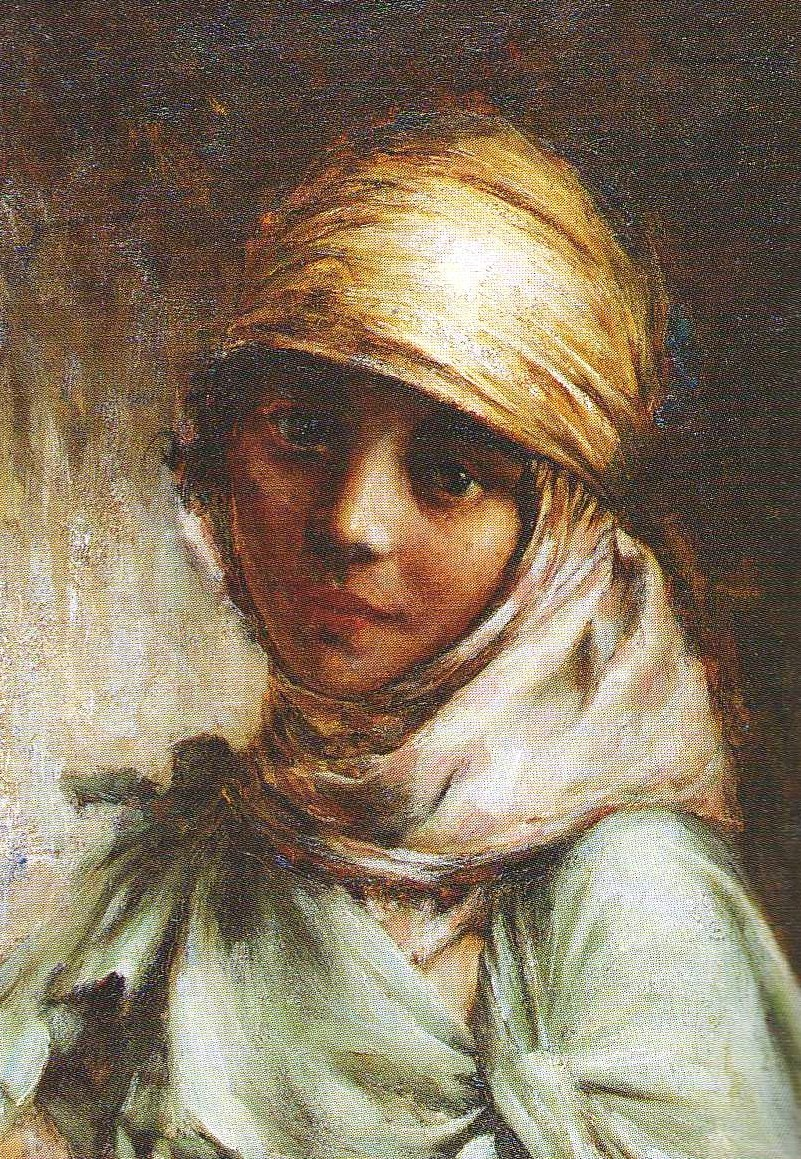
A portrait young woman from Algeria, date unknown

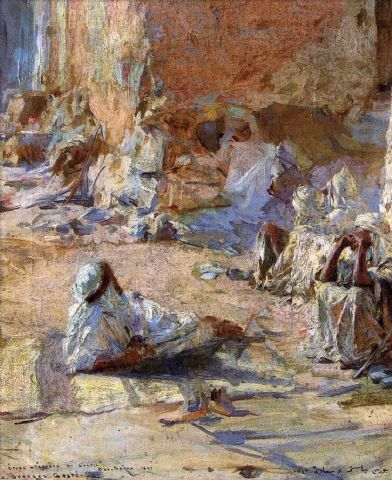
Study of Arabs in the Sun, 1897, date unknown

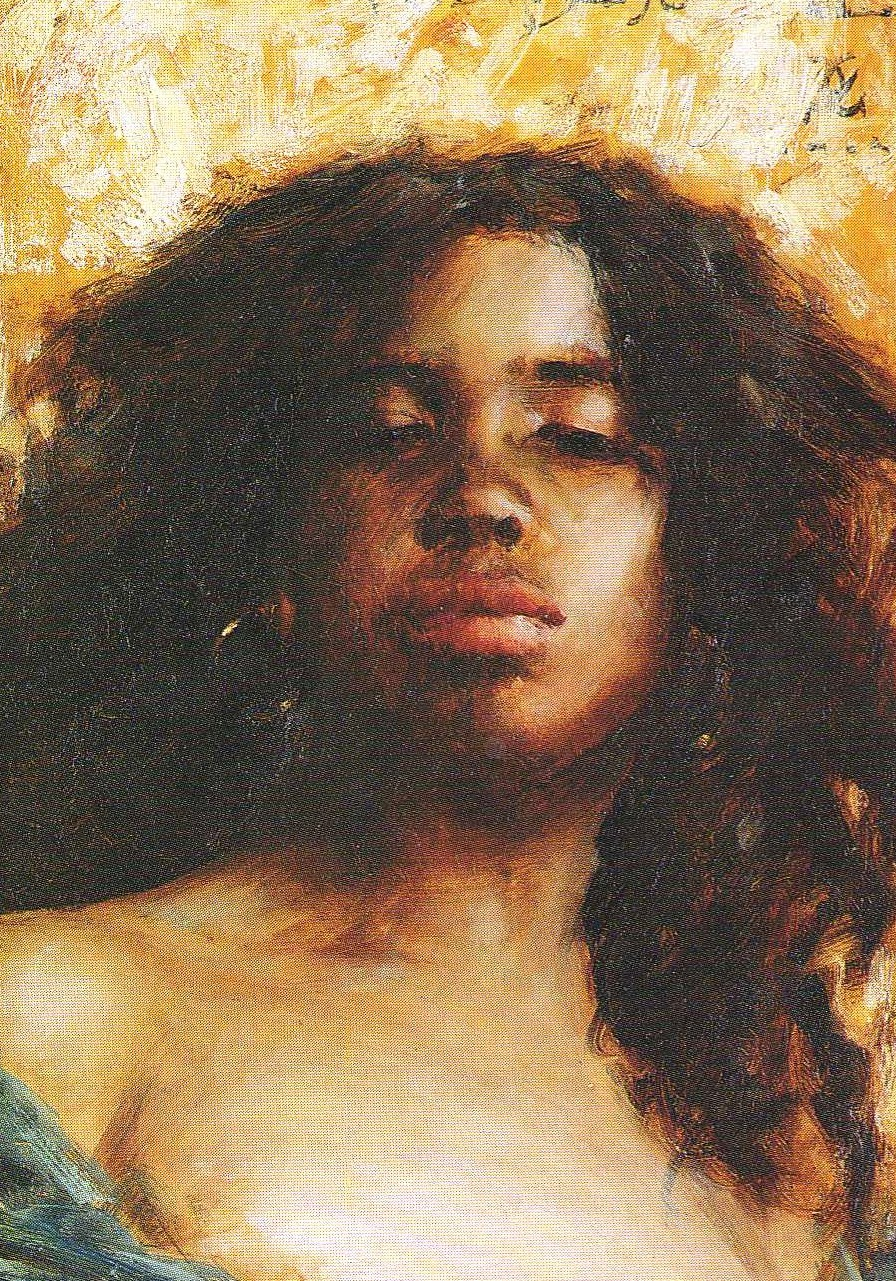
Portrait of a Sudanese woman

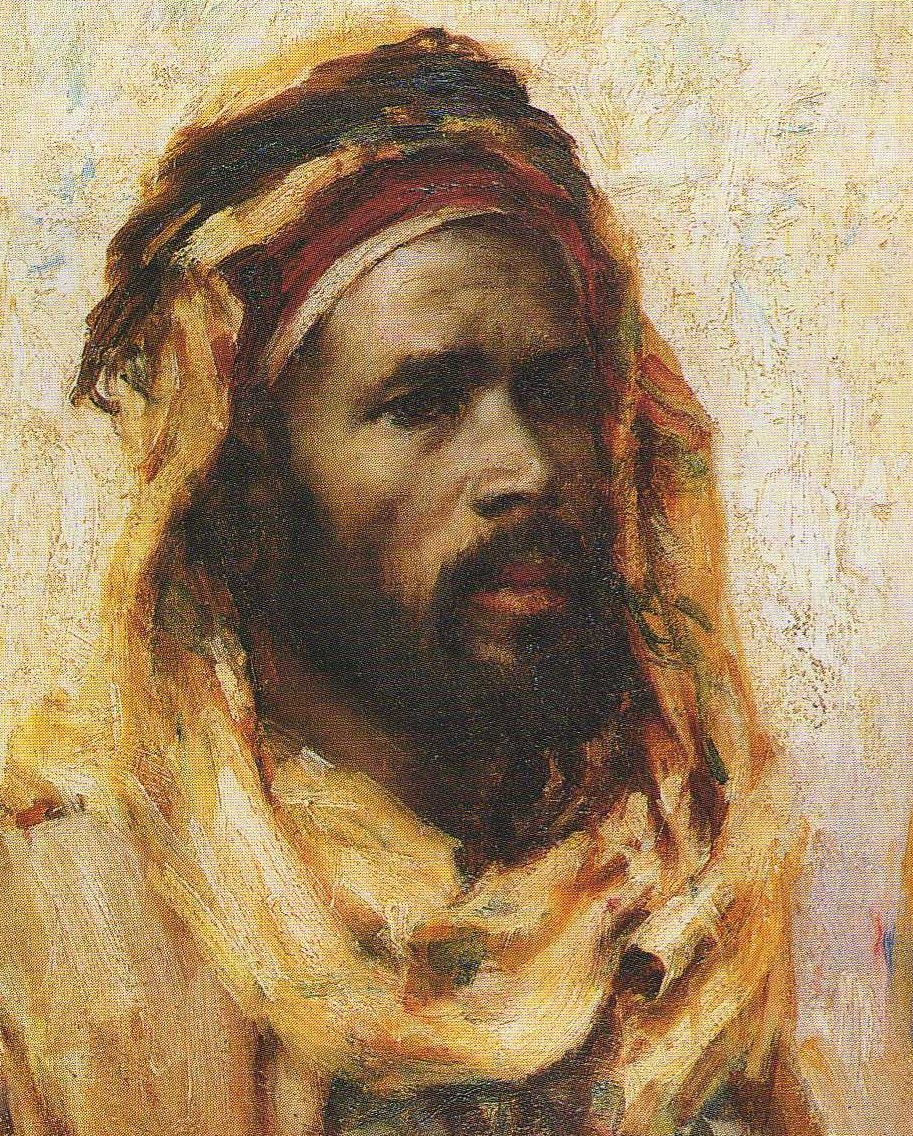
Portrait of a Man

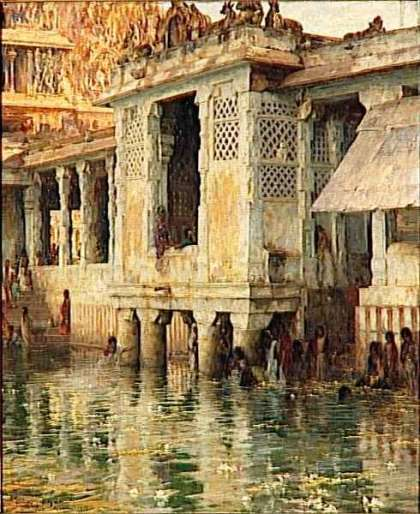
Le Bain de Brahmines, Madurai, 1909

== See also ==
- List of Orientalist artists
- Orientalism
- Société des Peintres Orientalistes Français
