= Algerian Family Code =

1984 Algerian code of laws

The Algerian Family Code (French: Code de Famille, Arabic: قانون الأسرة), enacted on June 9, 1984, specifies the laws relating to familial relations in Algeria. It includes strong elements of Islamic law which have brought it praise from Islamists and condemnation from secularists and feminists.

== History ==
The regulations imposed by the Family Code were in stark contrast to the role that women had during the struggle for liberation that Algeria faced. During this struggle, National Liberation Front FLN ensured the equality of men and women. This is reflected in the 1976 Algerian Constitution. These rights slowly started to diminish as in 1980, a ministerial order prohibiting women from travelling after a certain distance unaccompanied by a male relative was passed.

The Algerian Family Code is a document that governs the marriage and property rights of Algeria. It contains specifications that were based on Islamic traditions and are, according to the United Nations, “informed directly by the Islamic law “Fiqh”. The introduction of a Family Code allowed for restrictions that were contradictory to the role of women during the Algerian war for independence (1954–1962) to be present. In 1996, Algeria ratified the Convention on the Elimination of All Forms of Discrimination against Women and stated that they would aim to counter “discrimination against women in all matters relating to marriage and family relations […],” but in the condition that the convention followed the regulations in the pre-existing Family Code: “The Government of the People's Democratic Republic of Algeria declares that the provisions of article 16 concerning equal rights for men and women in all matters relating to marriage, both during marriage and at its dissolution, should not contradict the provisions of the Algerian Family Code.”. This had caused criticism by individuals including theorist Zahia Smail Salhi. Its critics particularly focus on its implications for women (who have less right to divorce than men, and who receive smaller shares of inheritance) and sometimes for apostates (who are disinherited, and whose marriages may be nullified.)

President Abdelaziz Bouteflika declared that the Family Code must be revised in the spirit of universal human rights and Islamic law. Reactions were mixed. Lachhab of the Islamist El Islah party declared that "We oppose these amendments which are contrary to Sharia, and thus to article 2 of the Constitution," whereas Nouria Hafsi of the pro-government RND declared "These timid amendments put forward a modern reading of the Sharia; the rights of women will finally be recognized by law. As of early 2005 it has not been changed.

== Marriage ==
Marriage is defined as a legal contract between a man and a woman. The legal age of marriage is 19, but judges may in special cases allow earlier marriage. A man may marry up to four wives; if so, he must treat them equally and inform them in advance, and they may demand a divorce. Marriage requires the consent of both parties and a gift by the groom of a dowry to the bride, as well as the presence of the bride's father or guardian (wali) and of two witnesses. The father of the bride may block the marriage, although her guardian may not. The marriage must be registered before a notary or legal functionary. Marriage is forbidden between close relatives by descent, marriage, or nursing: thus a man may not marry his mother, daughter, sister, aunt, niece, mother-in-law, daughter-in-law, stepmother-in-law, or stepdaughter-in-law, nor may he marry anyone who suckled from the same woman as he did, or from whom he suckled. A man may not be married to two sisters simultaneously. Marriage is also forbidden between a couple who have divorced each other for the third time, unless the wife has since been married to someone else. A Muslim woman may not marry a non-Muslim man, and a marriage may be annulled on the grounds of the spouse's apostasy. A husband is required to provide for his wife to the best of his abilities, and to treat his wives equally if he marries more than one. A wife is required to obey her husband and respect him as head of the family, to bring up and nurse his children, and to respect his parents and relatives. A wife has the right to visit her parents and to receive visits from them, and has rights over her own property.

Adoption is forbidden: a child may be brought up as part of the family, but must be considered the child of its natural parents, that is what Islamic law calls Kafala.

== Divorce ==
The husband may divorce his wife at will; if he is judged to have abused this privilege, his wife may be awarded damages, and he must provide for his divorced wife and her children if she has no family to go to, unless she had previously divorced or was guilty of immorality. The wife may request a divorce if any of the following apply:

- her husband has failed to provide for her;
- her husband is impotent;
- her husband has refused to have sex with her for over 4 months;
- her husband has been condemned to a dishonorable imprisonment of over a year's length;
- her husband has been absent for over a year without a good reason;
- her husband has failed to fulfill his legal duties towards her;
- her husband is guilty of grave immorality.

A women may also obtain the divorce if she pay reparations to her husband not to exceed the value of the dowry, and may not remarry until three menstrual periods have elapsed, or, if pregnant, until her baby's birth. In case of the father's absence or of divorce, custody of the child goes to his mother, or failing that his maternal grandmother or aunt, or failing that his father or paternal grandfather, or some other relative. A child brought up by a guardian attains independence at 15 (if male), or at marriage (if female).

The Family Code of 1984 condemned non-marital rape yet allowed for marital rape to continue to be decriminalised. Officially, women had the status of full citizens and were equal to men. Article 56 of the Code grants custody of the children to the father if the mother remarries, a section that failed to be removed in the 2005 revision and does not apply to the same situation for the male counterpart. Much like the law condemning violence against women, there exists a loophole that could easily void all progress made in parliament, a loophole held open by societal pressures. Keeping the remarriage clause would enable once more the father to gain full custody, taking into account that voluntarily unmarried women in Algeria are seen as “immoral” and functioning in society without a husband is extremely inconvenient considering the extensively male-oriented bureaucracy and systemic discrimination.

== Revolts against Family Code ==
In her text, Algerian Women, Citizenship and the 'Family Code', Zahia Smail Salhi looks at the efforts taken by women to contest the family code. She draws on experiences of women at that time to note that men were generally absent in this struggle. Since 1984, younger generations of women have joined the fight against the family code. This has led to some revisions to be made. The family code was revised in 2005, after then President Bouteflika announced stated, “I order the government to instate an ad hoc committee for the revision and redevelopment of the articles of said Code relating to divorce, which are open to interpretation […] to fill the gaps and ensure the protection of the rights of spouses and children."

Amendments were made in 2005 “in order to disconnect it from the most rigid interpretations of Islamic law." These amendments altered aspects including the minimum age for marriage and consent to marriage. The minimum age was changed to 19 years for both men and women and the bride had to consent herself (without proxy) to the marriage in order for a marriage contract to be formed.

Calls have continued to be made to repeal the Family Code, including by human rights activists such as Amel Hadjadj.
