= Amel Hadjadj =

Algerian human rights activist (born 1986)

- آمال حجاج
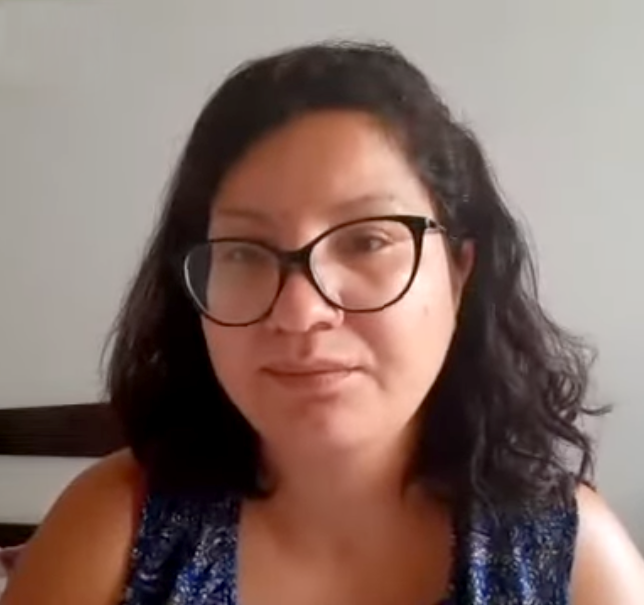
- In an online discussion in 2021
- Born: 1986 (age 39–40); Constantine, Algeria
- Occupations: Activist, writer

Amel Hadjadj (Arabic: آمال حجاج; born 1986) is an Algerian human rights activist. She is the founder of Le Journal Féministe Algérien (lit. 'Algerian Feminist Journal'), which reports on feminist news and initiatives.

== Biography ==
Hadjadj was born in 1986 in Constantine, Algeria. She initially worked in market and business consultancy before working for non-governmental organisations focused on gender and feminism.

Hadjadj is a member of the Algerian Feminist Association. She founded Le Journal Féministe Algérien, which aimed to share news and initiatives about feminist movements.

As a result of her activism, Hadjadj has been surveilled by Algerian security forces, including being interrogated at an airport and having her home raided. On 21 November 2019, Hadjadj was arbitrarily detained and physically assaulted by police officers outside a court in Algiers; the officers also made derogatory remarks about her during the arrest. Hadjadj was subsequently detained for two hours, during which she time she was prohibited from contacting her family or lawyer, before being released.

In 2020, Hadjadj criticised the Algerian government's decision to repeal a 2012 law that had introduced a women's quota system in municipal, provincial and parliamentary levels of governance to increase women's participation in politics; the new 2021 law reduced women's minimum guaranteed representation from 31.6% to 8%. She described the decision as evidence of Algerian authorities' "discrimination" against Algerian women, noting that the use of "competence" to justify the decision to reduce the quotas was untrue due to Algerian women being on average more educated than men. Hadjadj called for the quota system to be reinstated.

Hadjadj has cited a cycle between the understanding in Algeria that women are "inferior", which in turn causes Algerian women to "doubt" their own leadership abilities. She has called for a review of legislation to repeal any clauses that are discriminatory against women, particularly within family law. She has called for a repeal to allow women to receive their inheritance even if they do not have a husband or sons. Hadjadj has been critical of the Algerian Family Code, a 1984 code of laws which she described as "unconstitutional" due to it not achieving equality between men and women, including article 66, which caused women to lose custody of their children if they remarried; in addition to other articles that allowed men being allowed to divorce with justification or leave the country with their children without permission, while women were not. Hadjadj praised some steps made by the government, such as the 2005 repeal that saw "duty of obedience" principle legally expected of women abolished.

In 2025, Hadjadj participated in the Global March to Gaza from Algeria to the Rafah Border Crossing between Egypt and Palestine, alongside Sarah Lalou and Yakouta Benrouguibi, in support of Palestinian rights.
