= Women in Algeria =

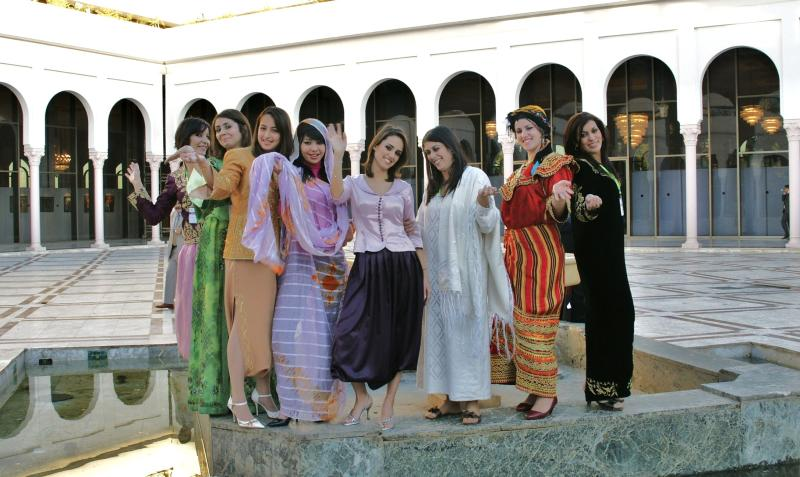
- Algerian women dressed in traditional garbs.

General statistics
- Maternal mortality (per 100,000): 112 (2017)
- Women in parliament: 8.11% (2021)
- Women over 25 with secondary education: 79.30% (2021)
- Women in labour force: 19.5% (2021)

Gender Inequality Index
- Value: 0.499 (2021)
- Rank: 126th out of 191

Global Gender Gap Index
- Value: 0.614 (2025)
- Rank: 141th out of 148

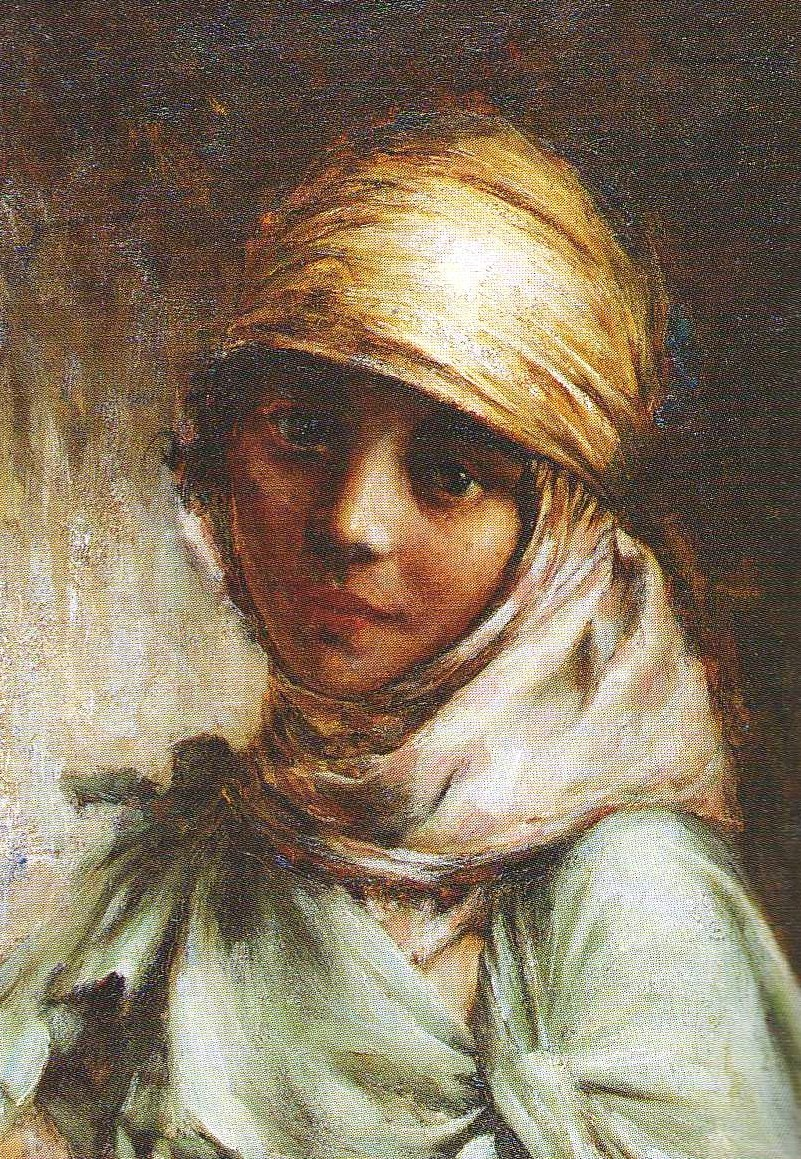
Portrait of a young Algerian woman, painted by Georges Gasté before 1910.

Throughout history of Algeria as an independent state, there has been conflict between women's rights activists and conservatives about the status of women in Algeria. The 1984 Algerian Family Code entrenched certain forms of gender inequality and discrimination against women. Some progressive reforms were implemented in 2005 and amendments were made to the laws.

== Background ==
Map of Algeria.

Algeria is a country in North Africa on the Mediterranean coast. After a prolonged rule by France, Algeria obtained independence from France in 1962. The Algerian Civil War (1991-2002) had a negative influence on women's wellbeing. 99% of the population is Arab-Berber, and a similar percentage is Muslim, predominantly Sunni. In Algeria, as in the rest of the MENA Region, women are traditionally regarded as the housekeeper, however women make up 65% of Algeria's university graduates and are the most educated gender. Algeria also has a strong culture of family honor, even amongst more liberal citizens.

== Marriage and personal life ==
The legal age for marriage is nineteen for men and women. Many Algerian women are getting married and starting families at much older ages than they did under French Rule. Education, work commitment, and changing social attitudes are the reasons for the change. In 2010, the total fertility rate was 1.76 children born/woman. This is a drop from 2.41 in 2009 and 7.12 in the 1970s just after the Algerian War of Independence from France.

French colonizers opposed veiling because of their secular sovereign constitution and the concept of laïcité. The French secular constitution is based in the Declaration of the Rights of the Man and of the Citizen of 1789.

== Education and employment ==
In 1845, Eugénie Allix Luce opened the first school open to girls, the Luce-Benaben school in Alger; however, few native girls were allowed to study in secular schools by their families, and only a small elite were able to study in the French schools.

Prior to the country's Independence, very few native Algerian women could read and write. This was the result of a French-imposed ban on Islamic education for the entire native Algerian population. Which also led to the shut down of many schools, until there were barely enough schools to fit the needs of the country. After independence, in 1990 "93% of boys and 83% of girls between 6 and 15 attended school girls constituted 49% of all pupils entered for the baccalaureate examination, and female students constituted 40% of all university". According to UN Women, female literacy rate has reached 81.4% while male literacy rate is 75.3%.

Post-Independence, North African and Algerian women enjoy many more human rights than their counterparts in neighboring and other African countries. Algerian women can inherit property (In accordance with the family law derived from Islamic Sharia in the distribution of inheritance between men and women), obtain a divorce, retain custody of their children, gain an education and work in many sectors of society. Women make up 70 percent of Algeria's lawyers and 60 percent of its judges. They also dominate the fields of medicine, healthcare and science. Increasingly, women contribute more to household income than men. As of 2007, sixty-five percent of university students are women, with more than 80% joining the workforce after graduation. They are encouraged by family members to become educated and contribute to Algerian society. Algerian women are among the first in North Africa to become taxi and bus drivers. Their numbers are also increasing in the police force and security positions. Also, according to a UNESCO report published in February 2021, entitled the Race against Time for Smarter Development, Algeria has a female engineer graduate proportion of 48.5%.

== History ==
Algeria was a French colony, French Algeria, between 1830 and 1962. In the 19th century, Algerian women lived in gender segregation in harem. The French did very little to liberate women. In the treaty Convention Franco-algérienne de 1830, signed on 5 July 1830 between the French and Hussein Dey, the last Bey of Alger, the French agreed to respect the traditional cultural customs of the Algerians, which meant that French law was only to apply to French colonist women, while indigenous Algerian women were to continue to be subjected to Islamic law. As a result, the life of Algerian women long remained unchanged and all reforms were slow, when they occurred at all.

While Eugénie Allix Luce founded a school in 1840s that did accept Algerian girls as students, this was an isolated example. The French Jules Ferry-law with mandatory elementary education for both genders which was introduced in the 1880s did not apply to Algerian girls, and in the 1950s, only 4 percent Algerian girls was enrolled in school. In 1930, educational centers were opened for Algerian women, but the number of students were few, and in 1962, 90 percent Algerian women were illiterate. Due to the treaty of 1830, the reforms of the French in favor of women's rights in Algeria were largely limited to granting bigger divorce rights to women, and to the reforms of women's suffrage and raising of the age of marriage for women in 1958.

In French Algeria, traditional custom and tradition, protected by the treaty of 1830, was seen as a bastion of resistance against French colonialism by the Algerians. As a result, the Algerians remained very conservative in regard to women's rights, with the exception of a small educated elite, and suggestions of reforms in the Islamic family law was met with intense resistance in the 1930s.

It was not until the 1940s that women's rights found support among the Algerians, since women were integrated in the political independence struggle, and it was within the political system the first women's organisations were founded, notably the Algerian Women's Union (UFA) and Association of Algerian Muslim Women (AFMA). During the Algerian war of independence, veiling were used both by the Algerians and the French. The French used deveiling of women as a symbol of the liberation women could achieve supported by the French, while the Algerians reacted to this by viewing veiling as a symbol of resistance to colonialism. After the war, women did not achieve liberation, but was instead subjected to a repressive conservative family law.

== Role of women in the Algerian War ==
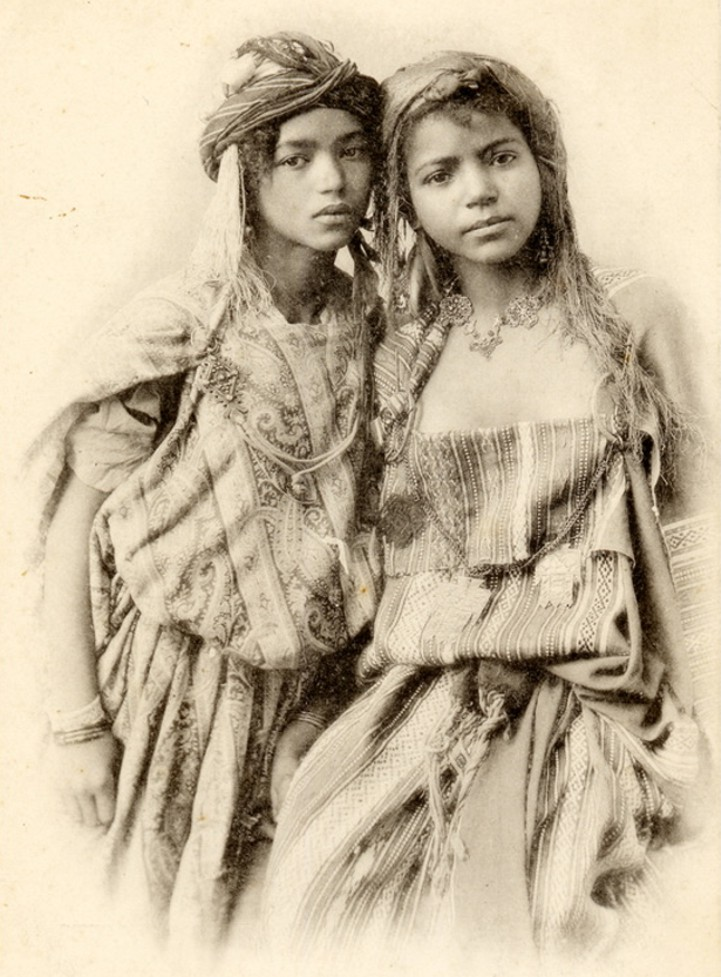
Photograph of two Algerian women from Bou Saâda, c. 1906.

Women fulfilled a number of different functions during the Algerian War. The majority of Muslim women who became active participants did so on the side of the National Liberation Front (FLN). The French included some women in their war effort, but they were not as fully integrated, nor were they charged with the same breadth of tasks as their Algerian sisters. The total number of women involved in the conflict, as determined by post-war veteran registration, is numbered at 11,000, but it is possible that this number was significantly higher due to underreporting.

There exists a distinction between two different types of women who became involved, urban and rural. Urban women, who constituted about twenty percent of the overall force, had received some kind of education and usually chose to enter on the side of the FLN of their own accord. Largely illiterate rural women, on the other hand, the remaining eighty percent, due to their geographic location in respect to the operations of FLN often became involved in the conflict as a result of proximity paired with force.

Women operated in a number of different areas during the course of the rebellion. "Women participated actively as combatants, spies, fundraisers, as well as nurses, launderers, and cooks", "women assisted the male fighting forces in areas like transportation, communication and administration", the range of involvement by a woman could include both combatant and non-combatant roles. While the majority of the tasks that women undertook centered on the realm of the non-combatant, those that surrounded the limited number that took part in acts of violence were more frequently noticed. The reality was that "rural women in maquis [rural areas] support networks" contained the overwhelming majority of those who participated. This is not to marginalize those women who did engage in acts of violence but simply to illustrate that they constituted in the minority.

== Post-Independence ==
Prior to the war of independence, women were in general excluded from the political life. Even though Algerian women had a big role in the war of independence, in the immediate postwar period after 1962 women’s roles as combatants and fighters were removed from the historical narrative by a “patriarchal nationalist movement”. So, gender roles changed only during the war for independence, after that women were asked to return to the original tasks of housewives. During the first National Assembly, there were only 10 women out of the 194 members that were present. These women had all taken part in the war for independence. In the second meeting of the National Assembly, 2 out of 138 members were women.

When Ben Bella became president in 1963 he tried to include women in the Algerian socialist society and tried to encourage men to let women start working and be a part of the process of national construction. Under the rule of Ben Bella it was not mandatory for women to wear a veil or a hayk. However, with the overthrow of Ben Bella and the rule of Boumediene in 1965 he started transforming the country to return to its “Arab Islamic roots”

In the 1960s and 1970s Algerian society has determined every aspect in women’s public and private life. However, for many Algerian feminists, the problems they faced were not supposed to be confined into only gender issues. The problems Algerian women faced should be seen through a wider lens, in the context of economic development and education. As Zohra Drif said “‘The liberation of men and women comes down to the question of education”. It was only in September 1981 with the family code when the Algerian women who participated in the war for independence decided to step into politics again and protest this project publicly. As this code undermined the rights of women. The family code which became a law in 1984 portrays sexism very clearly. With article 39 making it a “legal duty for Algerian women to obey their husbands. Article 11 prevents women from arranging their own marriage contracts unless represented by a matrimonial guardian”.

In October 1988 riots broke out in Algiers and then spread to other cities. With these riots the one party system came to an end and a new constitution in 1989 introducing a multi-party system and allowing the formation of associations and political parties. Over two thousand three hundred associations were founded, thirty of which were feminist associations. Some of the well known feminist associations during that time were “equal rights for men and women”, “the triumph of women's rights”, “the defense and promotion of women”, and “the emancipation of women”.

Today, women are represented, although still not proportionally to men, in both parliament and in ministerial positions. In 2012, Algerian women occupied 31 percent of parliamentary seats, placing the country 26th worldwide and 1st in the Arab world. In 2012 political reforms were established, with the support of the United Nations Development Program, to provide a legal framework that granted women 30 percent representation in elected assemblies. On the local level, the rate was only 18 percent, due to the fact that it was difficult to find women willing to appear on ballots in the communes. Currently, Algeria is facing a major setback in the representation of women in parliament. While women held 145 seats in the 2012 parliament, and 120 seats in the 2017 parliament, the number of seats in 2021 fell to “34 seats, comprising only 8 percent of the total 407 seats”.

Following President Bouteflika's re-election in 2014, seven women were appointed as ministers in his cabinet. This adds up to 20 percent of all the ministerial positions. The women occupying the seven new ministerial posts are: Minister of Education Nouria Benghebrit; Minister of Land-Use Planning and Environment Dalila Boudjemaa; Minister of Culture Nadia Labidi; Minister of Family and Women Mounia Meslem; Minister of Post, Information Technology and Communication Zahra Dardouri; Minister of Tourism Nouria Yamina Zerhouni and Delegate Minister of Handicrafts Aish Tabagho. There has until this day not been a female head of state. Louisa Hanoune became the first women in both Algeria and the Arab world to run for office in 2004.

== Economic participation ==
When it comes to owning land, women are at a major disadvantage. Their access to owning land is limited by the traditional laws of Algeria. Even though Algerian women by law have the right to access bank loans and are free to negotiate financial or business contracts, these actions are usually restricted by their husbands. There is still a gap between men and women when it comes to their percentage in the Algerian workforce. In 2019, women in the Algerian workforce represented 16.6% versus men who accounted for 66.73%. Also, in the year 2023, the female and male unemployment rates in Algeria corresponded to approximately 20.4 and 9.4 percent. The proportion of women in all careers (sciences, technology, medicine, literature) is 45%, while it is 50% in the exact sciences, which include physics, chemistry, and mathematics.

== Family life for women ==
When it comes to legal protections for women in Algeria, the current protections in place are general/vague and insufficient. The Family Code of 1984 is based on conservative religious principles. While the law was modified by Ordinance No. 05-02 of 27 February 2005, it still maintains many discriminatory provisions. The 1984 code had a growing tendency towards Islamic fundamentalism. Which in turn threatens women’s rights and privileges in Algeria. This new family code had restrictions for divorce for women, it required male guardians for women in marriage, and it permitted polygamy. Under this law, it was a legal duty for women to obey their husbands in everything, they did not have the right to apply for a divorce unless they choose to give up their alimony. Algerian women cannot marry foreigners, and they cannot give their names, nationalities, or religion to their children.

== Notable figures ==
- Kahina - 7th century female Berber religious and military leader, who led indigenous resistance to Arab expansion in Northwest Africa.
- Djamila Bouhired and Djamila Boupacha - Algerian revolutionaries and nationalists who opposed French colonial rule of Algeria in the 1960s.
- Assia Djebar - Novelist, translator and filmmaker. Most of her works deal with obstacles faced by women, and she is noted for her feminist stance.
- Zohra Drif - Retired lawyer and the vice-president of the Council of the Nation, the upper house of the Algerian Parliament.
- Hassiba Ben Bouali - A leader in the Algerian independence war, got killed by French troops in her hideout in 1957.

== See also ==
- Algerian women in France
- Algeria women's national football team
- Algeria women's national volleyball team
- Algeria women's national handball team
- List of Algerian women artists
- Women in the Algerian War
- Women of Algiers in Their Apartment
- Algerian Family Code
- Women in Africa
- Women's rights
