= Fatima Besnaci-Lancou =

French writer

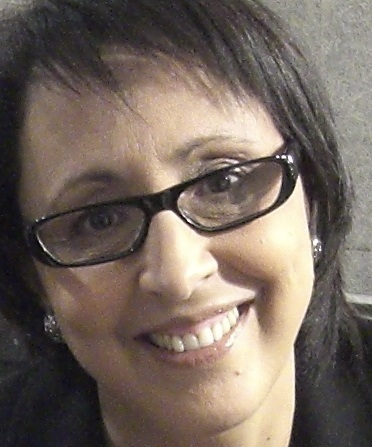
- Born: September 3, 1954; Novi (now Sidi Ghiles), Algeria
- Occupations: Essayist, novelist
- Writing career
- Genre: Memories of harkis
- Notable works: Fille de harki/Daughter of a Harki, Nos mères, paroles blessées - Une autre histoire de harkis/Our Mothers, words hurt, another story of Harkis, Treize chibanis harkis/Thirteen chibanis Harkis, Les harkis dans la colonisation et ses suites/The Harkis during colonization and the aftermath, Les harkis - idées reçues/Common Misconception of the Harkis, Des vies - 62 enfants de harkis racontent/Some lives - 62 children of Harkis are speaking out, Les harkis, Histoire, mémoire et transmission/Harkis, History, memory and transmission.
- Notable awards: Seligmann prize (2005)

Fatma Besnaci (1954 – present), known as Fatima Besnaci-Lancou, her pen name, is a French writer known for her work on Memories of harkis in France. Harkis were Algerian auxiliaries who fought for France during Algerian War (from 1954 to 1962).

== Biography ==
Fatma Besnaci (whose pen name is Fatima Besnaci-Lancou) was born in 1954 in Novi (now called: Sidi Ghiles), a town in Tipaza Province in northern Algeria. She is the eldest of eight siblings.

Fatima Besnaci-Lancou's father was a harki who fought in the Algerian War. After the war, French Army brought her family to France on 21 November 1962 as she was eight years old.

In France, Fatima Besnaci-Lancou and her family were placed and lived in few different Harkis camps located in various French regions. They were first in Camp at Rivesaltes, subsequently were moved to Bourg-Lastic, to Mouans-Sartoux (which was a "hameau de forestage"). As a daughter of a “Harki”, Fatima spent 15 years of her childhood in Harki Camps in France.Fatima attended school in Harki camps where they were taught in French. Children of Harkis then were not permitted to integrate with other French students.

== Key events ==
During the official visit of Algerian President Abdelaziz Bouteflika in France in June 2000, Algerian President, in response to a journalist's question on Harkis on TV declared that he was “not ready to accept Harkis'visit or return to Algeria..." He further declared and compared harkis to French collaborators under the Nazi occupation of 1940-44.”.

From that day on, Fatima Besnaci-Lancou fused her anger and decided to write. She was determined to write the true story of harkis in contrary to what is being said; and her desire to have her children to know their mother's life story. She rolled out her first personal testimonial life story as a Daughter of Harki in 2003.

On March 4 the same year, after Fatima published her book Daughter of a Harki, a notable historian and a former leader of FLN, Mohammed Harbi, after having read Fatima's book, wrote his view point in Le Monde, To say at last the war is over, in order to also explain that the Algerian drama had to be seen in its complexity and not in a manichean way.

January 10, 2004, she organized a demonstration, with the motto, the request for recognition of the neglect of the Harkis were victims, and the discrimantion they are still subject. The support of Human Rights League (LDH), Movement Against Racism and for Friendship between Peoples (MRAP), and International League against Racism and Anti-Semitism (LICRA). Fatima was criticized by some former Harkis for working with these organizations as they did not support Harkis in 1962 when they arrived in France. Fatima felt it "better than never".

The same year, Fatima founded the Association Harkis and Human Rights with Hadjila Kemoum. The objective is to work on the perspective memories of Harkis and its history. Also in 2004, Fatima worked to revisit with children of harkis and of Algerian immigrants. Fatima opened door to Manifesto for Recuperation of Confiscated Memories", those who stood up against the "simplification of the history"; classified as the "good "and the "mean"; people those "by choice, chance or necessity", again encounter themselves faced with the war in Algeria.

In 2005, Fatima was awarded the Seligmann Prize against racism and antisemitism, (founded by Françoise Seligmann) for her book Daughter of a Harki. February 28, 2005, she broadcasts a press release criticizing some aspects of the Law of February, 25th, 2005. In December 2005, Fatima was named as Honorary Citizen of Saint-Maximin-la-Sainte-Baume (Var).

In February 2006, Fatima organized a symposium at the National Assembly : The harkis during colonization and the aftermath. In September 2006, Fatima wrote and dedicated the book Our Mothers, words hurt, another story of Harkis based on several testimonials of first generation Harki women who came to France in 1962 with their husbands. Then in November, Fatima published testimonials of former harkis in Thirteen chibanis harkis.

In August 2008, Fatima published Common Misconception of the harkis with Abderahmen Moumen. In October 2008, Fatima organized series of public events with the Association of Harkis and Human Rights (series of cultural and scientific events, exhibitions, films, theater, international symposium, debates, lectures, under the generic title of French and Algerians, Art, Memories, History to share different visions of history).

She continued work of reconciliation between the Algerian harkis and immigrants through meetings, particularly with the Algerian writer, Maïssa Bey; while the situation remain highly critical and exigent against harkis remained in Algeria or state of reception of former harkis living in France and wish to travel to Algeria.

After the "Manifesto for Recuperation of Confiscated Memories," was published in 2004, an article France Algeria: the Ways of Reconciliation. " appeared in the newspaper "Le Figaro" by Yazid Sabeg and Fatima Besnaci-Lancou, followed by the France-Algeria: Go Beyond the Historical Dispute signed by prominent French and Algerian personalities, which was published in the daily "Le Monde" on December 1, 2007.

May 29, 2009, Fatima organized with the assistance of the National Museum of the History of Immigration (CNHI), the National Institute for Pedagogical Research (INRP), a study day for teachers How to teach the history of harkis.".

She is a member of " Marianne of Diversity " and a Board member of "Memories and History " of the Memorial of Rivesaltes. She is an editor in chief of the Journal of the NGO PLAC 21.

== Bibliography ==
- Fille de harki/Daughter of a Harki, Éditions de l’Atelier, (2003), 2005 (preface by Jean Daniel et Jean Lacouture, afterword by Michel Tubiana), ISBN 978-2-7082-3834-3.
- Témoignage et regard d’écrivain , dans Lila Ibrahim-Lamrous, Catherine Milkovitch-Rioux (dir.), Regards croisés sur la guerre d’Algérie, collection « littératures », Presses Universitaires Blaise Pascal, 2005, pp. 245–249.
- Nos mères, paroles blessées - Une autre histoire de harkis/Our Mothers, words hurt, another story of harkis'', Éditions Zellige, 2006 (preface by Claude Liauzu), ISBN 978-2-914773-07-2.
- Treize chibanis harki/Thirteen chibanis harkis, éd. Tiresias, 2006 (preface by Gilles Manceron, afterword by Amar Assas,ISBN 978-2-915293-39-5 .
- With Gilles Manceron, Les harkis dans la colonisation et ses suites/The harkis during colonization and the aftermath, Éditions de l'Atelier, 2008 (preface by Jean Lacouture), ISBN 978-2-7082-3990-6.
- With Abderahmen Moumen, Les harkis/Common Misconception of the harkis, Éditions Le Cavalier Bleu, collection « idées reçues », 2008, ISBN 978-2-84670-208-9.
- Le rapatriement vu par une femme de harki, témoignage recueilli par Fatima Besnaci-Lancou , dans C. Harrir, J.J. Jordi, A. Perroy (dir.), Les valises sur le pont – La mémoire du rapatriement maritime d’Algérie – 1962, Marines éditions, 2009.
- Des vies - 62 enfants de harkis racontent/Some lives - 62 children of Harkis are speaking out (dir.), éd. de l'Atelier, 2010 (preface by Boris Cyrulnik), ISBN 978-2-7082-4108-4.
- With Benoit Falaize et Gilles Manceron (dir.), Les harkis, Histoire, mémoire et transmission/Harkis, History, memory and transmission, preface by Philippe Joutard, Ed. de l'Atelier, septembre 2010, ISBN 978-2-7082-4117-6.

== Notes and references ==
This article has been expanded with material from the corresponding page in French Wikipedia.
