= Internment camps in France =

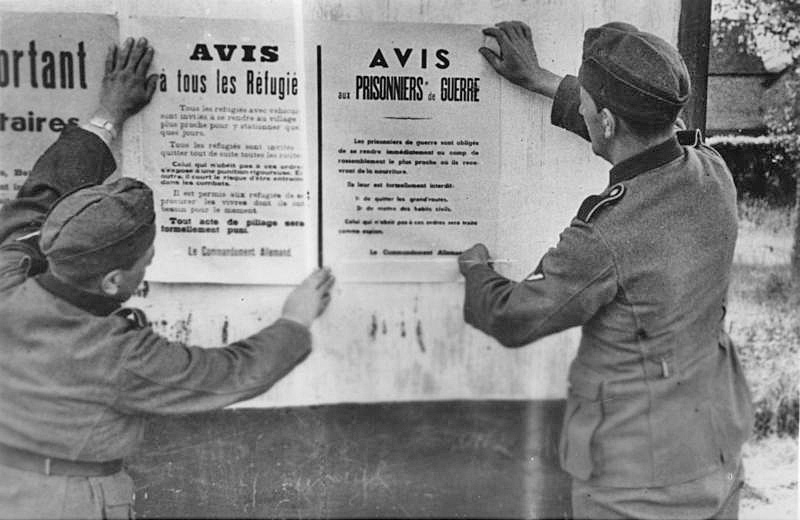
German soldiers posting notices for refugees and prisoners of war in France, May 1940

Numerous internment camps and concentration camps were located in France before, during and after World War II. Beside the camps created during World War I to intern German, Austrian and Ottoman civilian prisoners, the Third Republic (1871–1940) opened various internment camps for the Spanish refugees fleeing the Spanish Civil War (1936–1939). Following the prohibition of the French Communist Party (PCF) by the government of Édouard Daladier, they were used to detain communist political prisoners. The Third Republic also interned German anti-Nazis (mostly members of the Communist Party of Germany, KPD).

Then, after the 10 July 1940 vote of full powers to Marshal Philippe Pétain and the proclamation of the État français (Vichy regime), these camps were used to intern Jews, Gypsies, and various political prisoners (anti-fascists from all countries). Vichy opened up so many camps that it became a full economic sector, to the extent that historian Maurice Rajsfus writes: "The quick opening of new camps created jobs, and the Gendarmerie never ceased to hire during this period." In any case, most of these camps were closed definitively after the liberation of France at the end of World War II. Some "regroupement camps" were however used during the Algerian War (1954–1962). Several of these were then used to intern harkis (Algerians who had fought on the French side) after the 19 March 1962 Évian Accords. Finally, the Camp de Rivesaltes in the Pyrénées-Orientales and the camp of Bourg-Lastic in the Puy de Dôme were also used to intern Kurdish refugees from Iraq in the 1980s.

== First World War and later ==
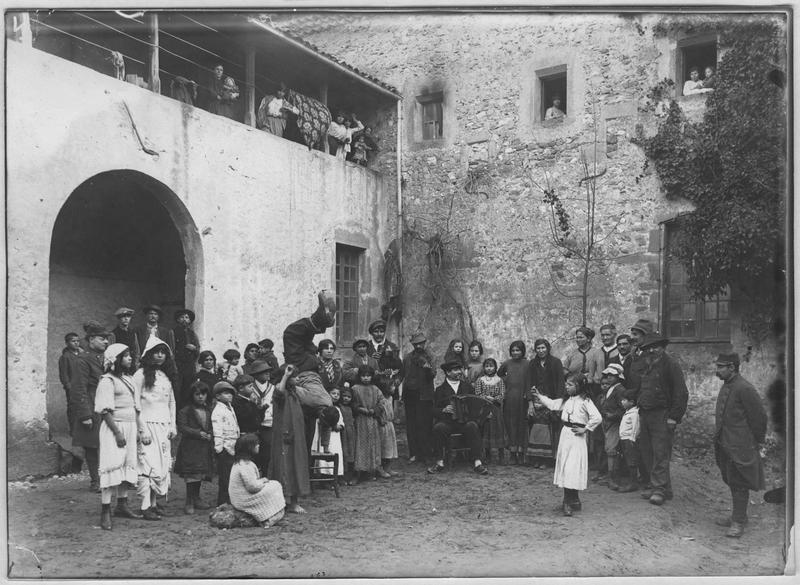
Gypsies at the Crest concentration camp, 1916

The first internment camps were opened during the First World War (1914–1918) to detain civilian prisoners (mainly German, Austro-Hungarian and Ottoman). These prisoners were detained in Pontmain in the department of Mayenne, Fort-Barreaux in Isère, in the military camp of Graveson (Bouches-du-Rhône), in Frigolet near Tarascon (Bouches-du-Rhône), Noirlac (Abbey) (Cher), and Ajain(Creuse).

Other internment camps were used for Armenians in the 1920s-1930s (Mirabeau camp, Victor Hugo camp and Oddo Camp in Marseille); Gypsies after the 1912 Act on nomadism (for instance in the Royal Saltworks at Arc-et-Senans, but also in iron mines in the Manche and other disaffected industrial centers in Mayenne, in the Manche, in Loire-Atlantique, in the Sarthe, in the Maine-et-Loire, etc.).

== Spanish Civil War ==
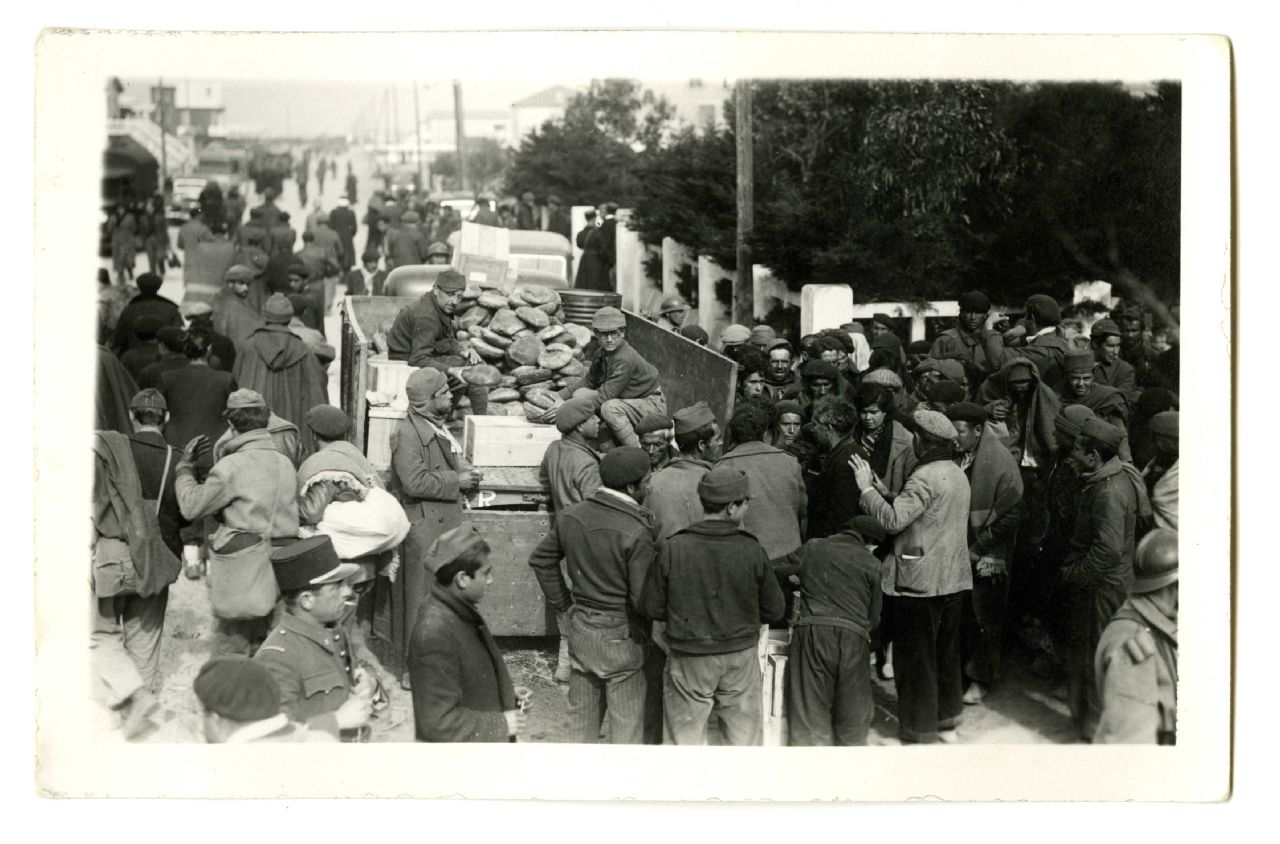
Refugees at the Argelers concentration camp, 1939

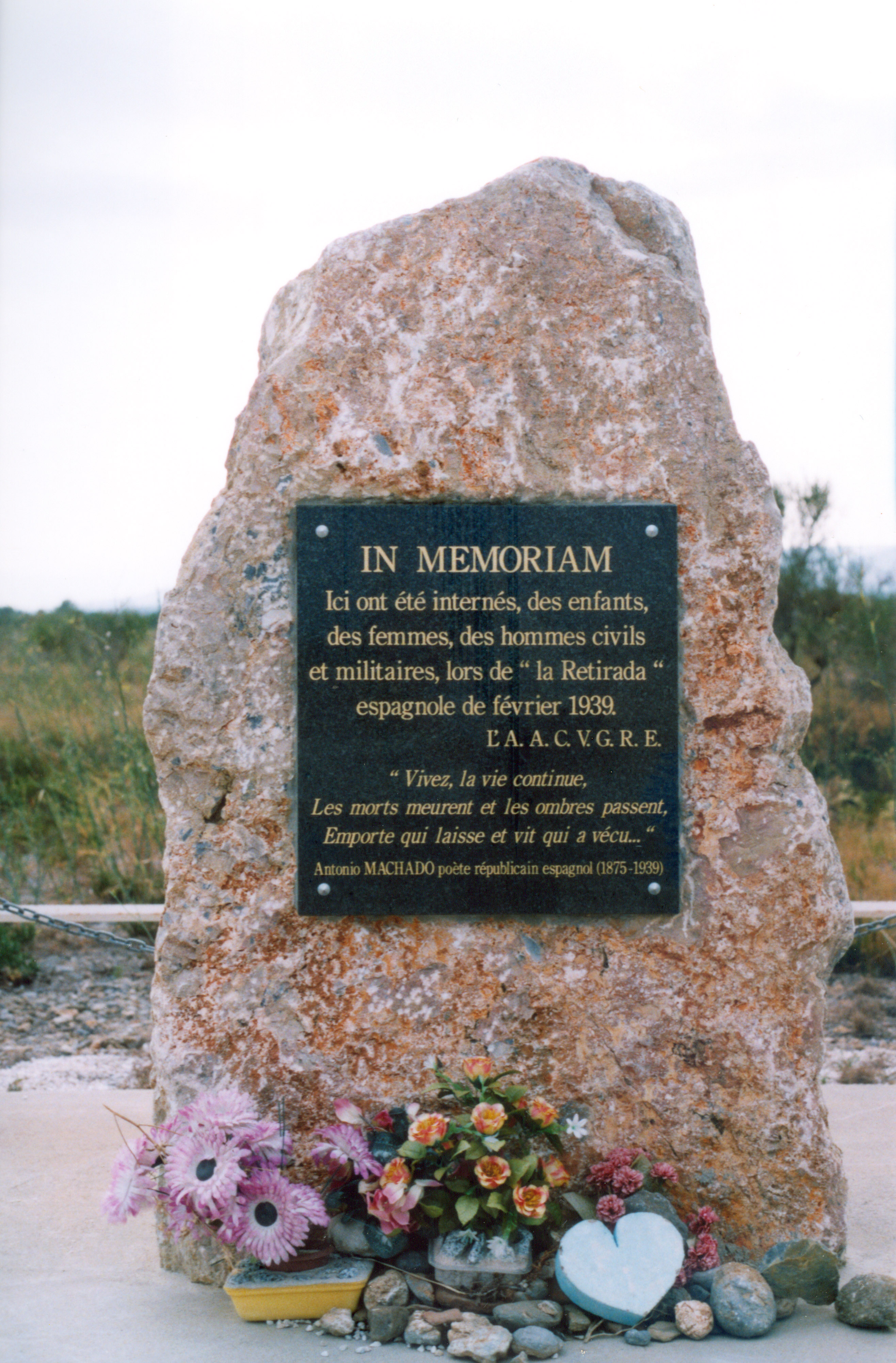
Commemorative stele for survivors of the retirada at Camp de Rivesaltes.

The most infamous internment camps before World War II were used to intern the Spanish Republican refugees and military personnel during the Spanish Civil War. In 2 weeks in January and February 1939 around 500,000 men, women and children crossed the border. These were interned mostly in camps in the Roussillon Province, such as the Camp de concentration d'Argelès-sur-Mer although internment camps for defeated Spanish Republicans were established in all of French territory, even in Brittany, in the north-west of France. These camps were located in:

- Agde in the Hérault department (near Montpellier)
- Argelès-sur-Mer, between Perpignan and the border
- Camp Gurs in the Pyrénées-Atlantiques, which received Spanish refugees following the defeat of the Spanish Republic. These were distinguished by the French state into Brigadists, gudaris (Basque nationalists) who had escaped from the siege of Santander, pilots, and farmers. The latter had trades that were in low demand, and the French government, in agreement with the Francoist government, incited them to return to Spain. The great majority did so and were turned over to the Francoist authorities in Irún. From there they were transferred to the Miranda de Ebro camp for purification according to the Law of Political Responsibilities.
- Camp Vernet near Pamiers, in the Ariège.
- Moisdon-la-Rivière and Juigné-des-Moutiers in Loire-Atlantique department (Brittany).
- The Camp de Rivesaltes, in the department of Pyrénées-Orientales. The Jewish detainees were sent to Drancy internment camp, near Paris, the Gypsies to Saliers and the Spaniards to camp Gurs.

To these camps must be added the camps for the German prisoners in 1939 (sometimes overlapping with those above), and those of the Colonial Empire, not well known in Europe.

Furthermore, the Chilean poet Pablo Neruda, who had been named Consul in Paris for Immigration, organized the transportation to Chile of 2,200 Spanish refugees who had been detained in the camps on board the Winnipeg, which departed on 2 August 1939, and arrived in Valparaíso at the beginning of September 1939.

After 1940 when Nazi Germany divided France in occupied and free zone, the camps were also used to imprison Jews, Gypsies, and sometimes gays, and the original prisoners were used as forced labor to make the camps larger.

== During World War II and the Vichy regime ==
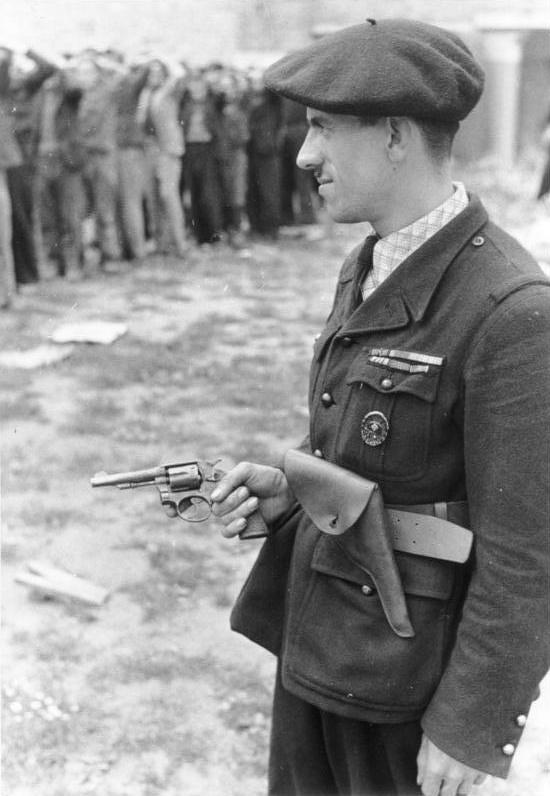
French Milice guard watching resistants

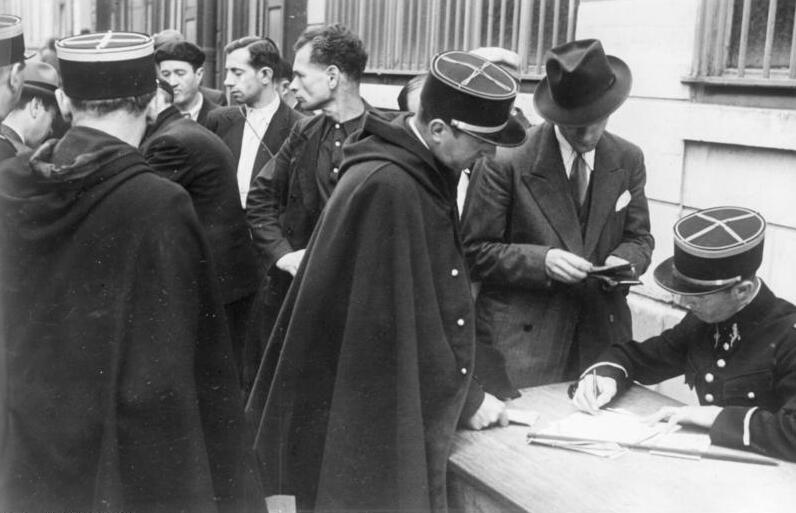
Arrest of Jews in France, August 1941

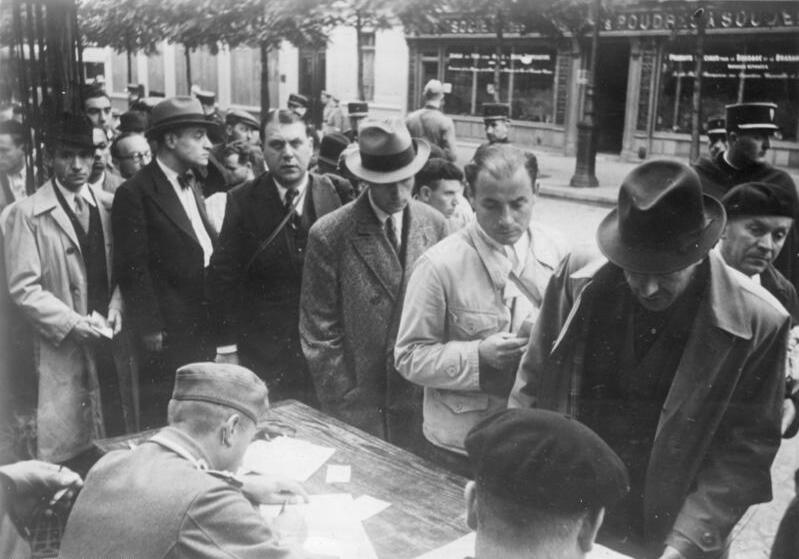
Arrest of Jews in France, August 1941

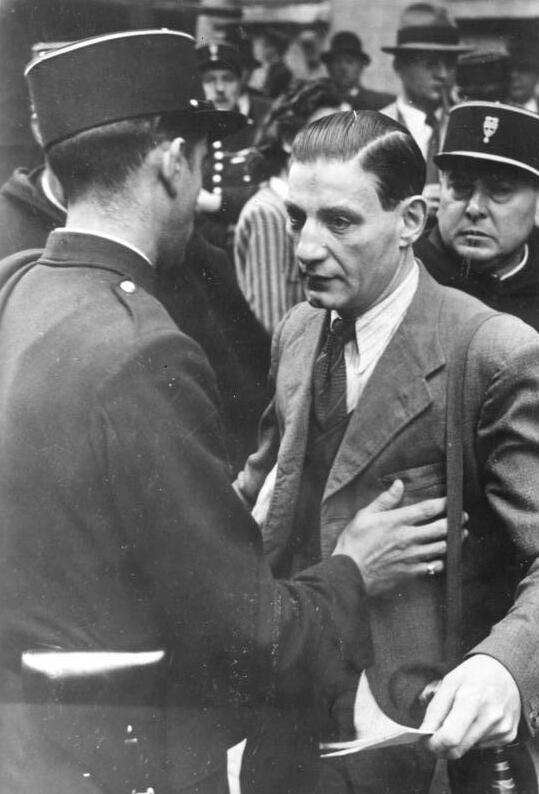
Arrest of a Jewish man by the French police in Paris, during the roundup of 20 August 1941

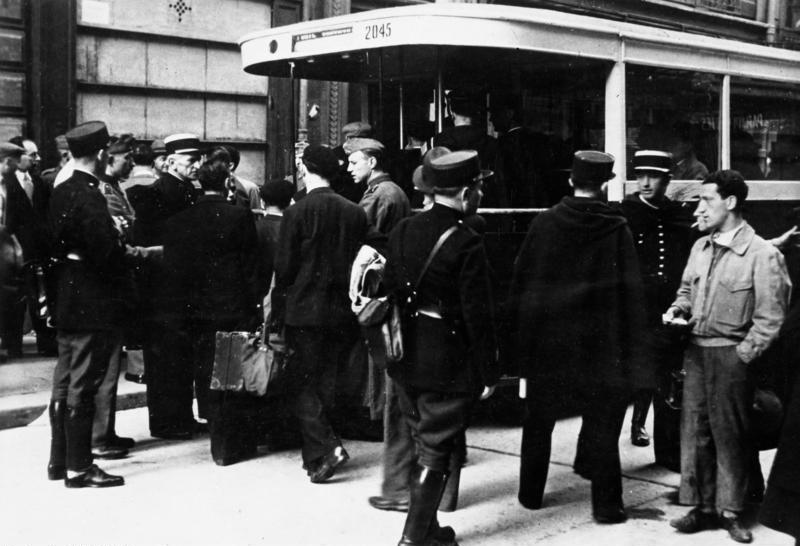
Arrest of Jews by the French police in Paris, August 1941

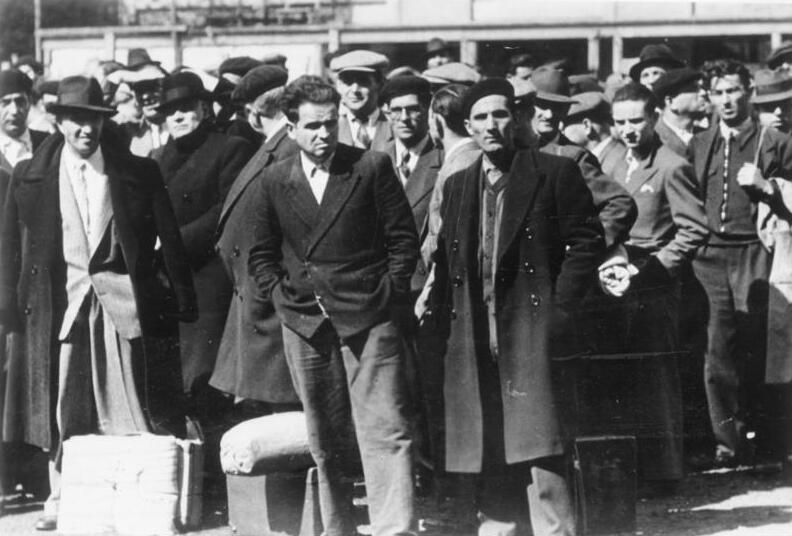
Jewish prisoners in France, August 1941

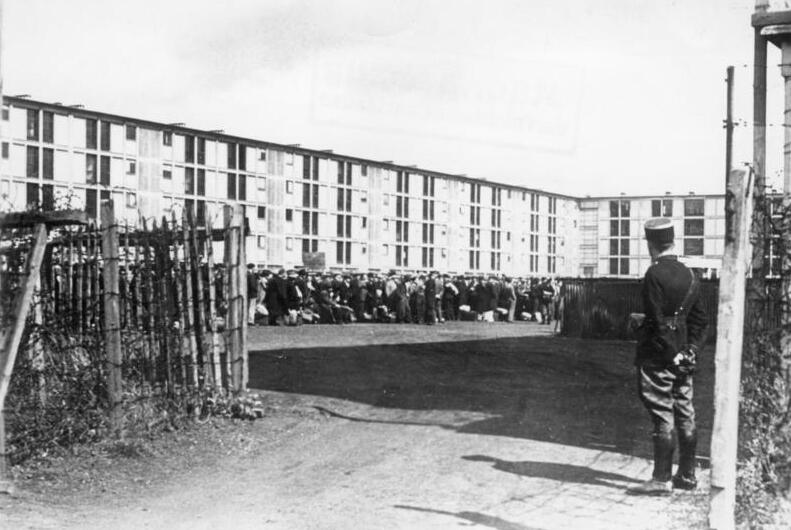
Jewish prisoners in France, August 1941

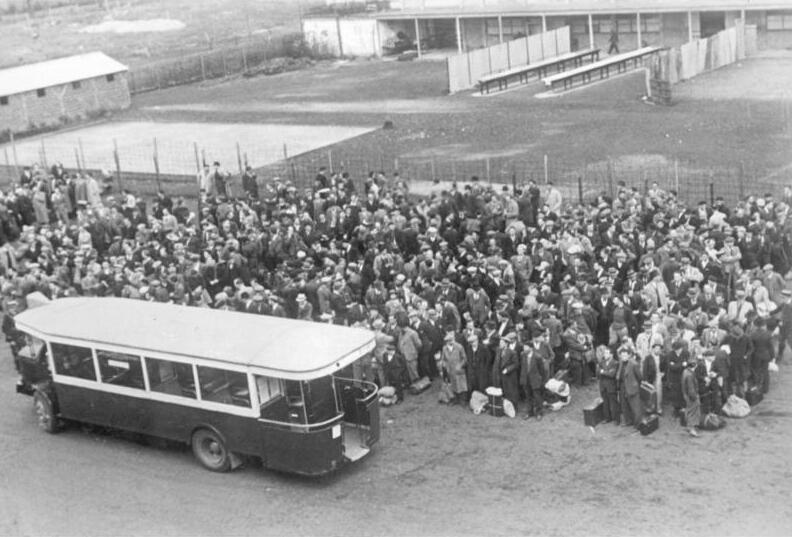
Jewish prisoners in France, August 1941

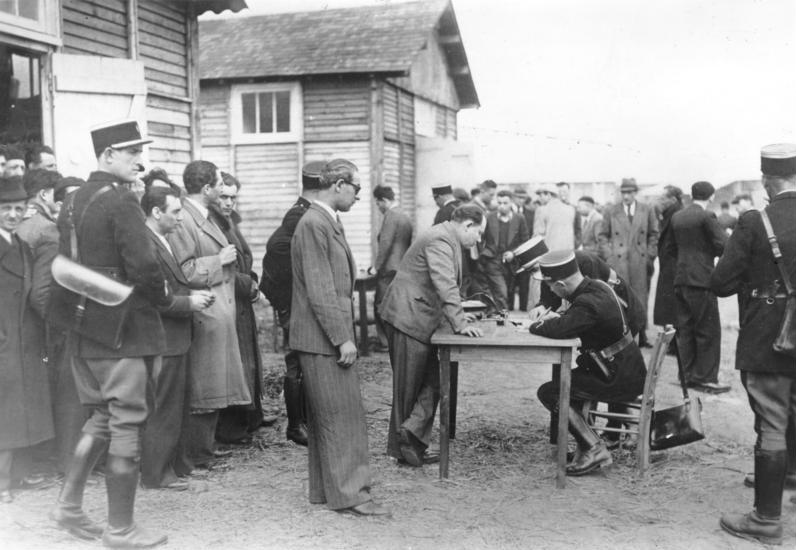
French Police checking new inmates in the camp Pithiviers

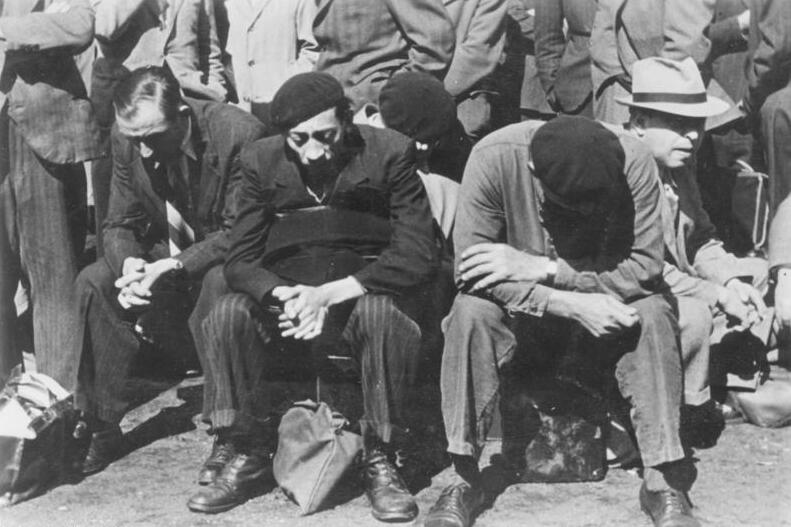
Jewish prisoners in France, August 1941

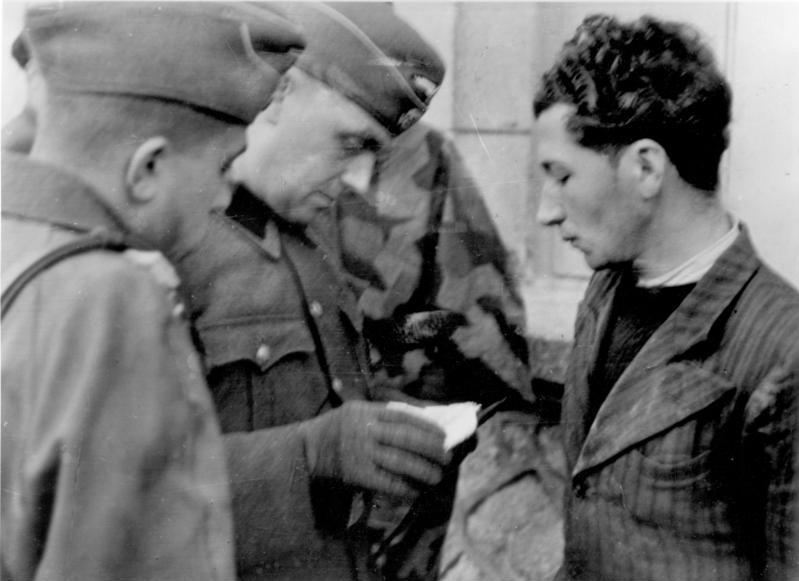
Alleged Communist Resistance prisoner in France, July 1944

As early as 1939, the existing camps were indiscriminately filled with German anti-Nazis (Communists, German Jews, etc. Following the 1940 defeat, and the 10 July 1940 vote of full powers installing the Vichy regime, these camps were filled with Jews, first with foreign Jews, then indifferently with foreign and French Jews. The Vichy government would progressively hand them up to the Gestapo, and they would all transit by Drancy internment camp, the last stop before concentration camps in the Third Reich and in Eastern Europe and the extermination camps.

Beside Jews, Germans and Austrians were immediately rounded-up in camps, as well as Spanish refugees, who were later deported. 5,000 Spaniards thus died in Mauthausen concentration camp. The French colonial soldiers were interned by the Germans on French territory, instead of being deported.

The Third Republic and the Vichy regime would successively call these places "reception camps" (camps d'accueil), "internment camps" (camps d'internement), séjour camps (camps de séjour), "guarded séjour camps" (camps de séjour surveillés), "prisoner camps" (camps de prisonniers), etc. Another category was created by the Vichy regime: the "transit camps" ("camps de transit"), referring to camps that briefly held prisoners before deportation to other Nazi camps. Beaune-la-Rolande, Pithiviers, Drancy and Compiègne formed the core of the internment and deportation system for Jews in northern France. Pithiviers and Beaune-la-Rolande were used during the 1941 green ticket roundup as well as during the 1942 Vel' d'Hiv Roundup, before the victims, including children, were transferred to Drancy and finally deported to Auschwitz were they were murdered.

During the 1944 Battle of Marseille and urban scaping operations in the center of town, 20,000 people were expelled from their homes and interned during several months in military camps nearby Fréjus (La Lègue, Caïs and Puget).

The camp of Struthof, or Natzweiler-Struthof, in Alsace, one of the concentration camps created by Nazis on annexed French territory, included a gas chamber which was used to kill at least 86 detainees (mostly Jewish) with the aim of forming a collection of preserved skeletons for the use of Nazi professor August Hirt.

== Second World War camps ==
- Aincourt, in Seine-et-Oise, was the first internment camp in the Northern Zone. It was opened on 5 October 1940, and quickly filled with members of the French Communist Party (PCF)
- Les Alliers, near Angoulême, in Charente
- Royal Saltworks at Arc-et-Senans (Saline royale d'Arc-et-Senans) in the Doubs, used for Gypsies
- Avrillé-les-Ponceaux in Indre-et-Loire, camp of the Morellerie for Gypsies
- Le Barcarès in the Roussillon
- Beaune-la-Rolande internment camp at Beaune-la-Rolande in the Loiret
- Bourg-Lastic in the Puy de Dôme, a former military camp where Jews were detained (André Glucksmann was detained there for four years). The camp was used to intern Harkis in the 1960s and Kurdish refugees from Iraq in the 1980s (see below).
- Bram in the Aude (1939–1940)
- Brens in the Tarn, near Gaillac (1939–1940)
- Choisel, in Chateaubriant in Brittany, in Loire-Atlantique (1941–1942)
- Camp of Royallieu in Compiègne, Picardy (June 1941 to August 1944). It was used to intern the Jewish detainees arrested during the January 1943 Marseille roundup. Robert Desnos (1900–1945) and the famous French Resistance member Jean Moulin (1899–1943) transited through this camp.
- Coudrecieux in the Sarthe, was used to intern Romanis.
- Douadic in the Indre department
- Drancy internment camp: On 20 August 1941, French police conducted raids throughout the 11th arrondissement (district) of Paris and arrested more than 4,000 Jews, mainly foreign or stateless Jews. French authorities interned these Jews in Drancy, marking its official opening. French police enclosed a police barrack with barbed-wire fencing and provided Gendarmerie to guard the camp. Drancy fell under the command of the Gestapo Office of Jewish Affairs in France and German SS Captain Theodor Dannecker. Five subcamps of Drancy were located throughout Paris (three of which were the Austerlitz, Lévitan and Bassano camps)
- Fort-Barraux in the department of Isère. It had already been used as a prison during the French Revolution; Antoine Barnave was imprisoned there.
- Gurs internment camp in the Pyrénées-Atlantiques, created in 1939 for the Spanish refugees. During the Phony War, the Third Republic used it to intern "indésirables", that is Germans who were found in France, without regard to ethnicity or political orientation, as foreign citizens of an enemy power. Among them stands out a significant number of German Jews who had fled the very Nazi regime; citizens of countries who were in the orbit of the Reich, like Austria, Protectorate of Bohemia and Moravia, Slovak Republic, Fascist Italy, or Poland; French activists of the left (trade unionists, socialists, anarchists, and especially, communists), following the proscription of the Parti Communiste Français (PCF) by Daladier after the German–Soviet Non-aggression Pact; the first of these arrived 21 June 1940, and the majority were relocated in other camps before the end of the year. In Gurs were also interned during this period: anti-militarists, representatives of the French extreme right who sympathized with the Nazi regime, ordinary prisoners evacuated from prisons in the north of the country ahead of the German advance, common criminals awaiting trial. Then, under Vichy, Camp Gurs was used to detain foreign Jews, German Jews deported by the SS from southern Germany, persons who had illegally crossed the border of the zone occupied by the Germans, Spaniards fleeing Francoist Spain, Spaniards coming from other camps that had been condemned for being uninhabitable or due to their scarce contingent, stateless persons, people involved in prostitution, homosexuals, Romani people and indigents.
- Jargeau, near Orléans, used for the internment of Romani people
- Lalande in the Yonne,
- Linas-Montlhéry in the Seine-et-Oise for Romani people
- Marolles in the Loir-et-Cher
- Masseube in the Gers
- Les Mazures in the Ardennes department, where a Judenlager was opened from July 1942 to January 1944
- The Merignac internment camp in the Gironde. This is where Maurice Papon had Jews of the Bordeaux region interned before going to Drancy. Among others, Robert Aron was detained there.
- Meslay-du-Maine, in Mayenne department (1939–1940) (Leon Askin held here 1939)
- Camp des Milles near Aix-en-Provence in the Bouches-du-Rhône, which was the largest internment camp in the southeast of France. 2,500 Jews were deported from there following the August 1942 raids. Novelist Lion Feuchtwanger, Surrealist artists Hans Bellmer and Max Ernst were among the most famous inmates detained in this concentration camp.
- Montceau-les-Mines
- Natzweiler-Struthof a German-run concentration camp located in the Vosges Mountains close to the Alsatian village of Natzwiller (German Natzweiler)
- Nexon in the Haute-Vienne
- Noé - Mauzac in the Haute-Garonne
- Montreuil-Bellay in the Maine-et-Loire, created to intern Romani people
- Les Tourelles in Paris
- Pithiviers transit camp in Pithiviers. Jewish novelist Irène Némirovsky (1903–1942) was interned there.
- Poitiers in the Vienne department to intern Romani people
- Port-Louis, in Morbihan, in the fort
- Recebedou, in Haute-Garonne, in the suburbs of Toulouse
- Camp of Rieucros in Lozère (the mathematician Alexander Grothendieck was interned there)
- The Camp de Rivesaltes, in the Pyrénées Orientales, "The Drancy of the zone sud";
- Fort de Romainville ("Fort of Romainville"), was a Nazi prison, located in the outskirts of Paris. The Fort was invested in 1940 by the German military and transformed into a prison. From there, resistance members and hostages were directed to the Nazi concentration camps: 3,900 women and 3,100 men were interned before being deported to Auschwitz, Ravensbrück, Buchenwald and Dachau. 152 persons were executed by firing squad in the Fort itself. A few escaped, such as Pierre Georges, alias "Colonel Fabien." From her cell, Danielle Casanova, motivated and encouraged her comrades to confront their torturers. From October 1940, the Fort held only female prisoners (resistance members and hostages), who were jailed, executed or redirected to the Nazi concentration camps outside France. At the time of the Liberation in August 1944, many abandoned corpses were found in the Fort's yard.
- Saint-Cyprien in the Pyrénées-Orientales. 90,000 Spanish refugees were interned there in March 1939, and it was officially closed on 19 December 1940 for "sanitary reasons", its occupants transferred to the Camp of Gurs.
- Saint-Maurice-aux-Riches-Hommes in the Yonne, for Gypsies
- Saint-Paul d'Eyjeaux in the Haute-Vienne
- Saint-Sulpice-la-Pointe. Located near Toulouse, this transit camp was set up after the beginning of the Phony War. It was to house "individuals representing a danger to national security" - mostly militant communists. In June 1940, with the first German attacks on the Soviet Union, people with Russian citizenship were interned there. Later, foreign Jews who had been living in hiding in the south of France and were rounded up in the summer of 1942 were also sent to the camp. The inmates, especially the communists, organized many cultural activities, a "little university", in which each one contributed their knowledge for the collective good. From the summer of 1942 to the closing of the camp in August 1944, most of its inmates were deported to camps in Eastern Europe, Auschwitz and Buchenwald.
- Saliers concentration camp near Arles in the Bouches-du-Rhône, interned Romani people
- Schirmeck in Alsace in the part not annexed by the Third Reich
- Septfonds
- Thil in Meurthe-et-Moselle
- Le Vernet Internment Camp in the Ariège which concentrated 12,000 Spanish refugees as early as 1939. It was used later on for the internment of the harkis.
- Vittel in the Vosges department, where US or British citizens were interned
- Voves in the Eure-et-Loir
- Woippy in the department of Moselle, created in 1943.

=== Camps under foreign authorities ===
The Nazis also opened Struthof in Alsace (in the part annexed by the Reich).

The United States military police also possessed legal authority over the camp in Septèmes-les-Vallons, in the Bouches-du-Rhône.

==== Ilags ====
Ilag (for Internierungslager) were internment camps established by the German Army to hold Allied civilians, captured in areas that were occupied by the Germans. They included US citizens caught in Europe by surprise when the war was declared in December 1941 and citizens of the British Commonwealth caught in areas engulfed by the Blitzkrieg.

- Besançon in the Doubs (in the Vauban barracks). Also called Frontstalag 142, it was actually an internment camp. At the end of 1940, 2,400 women, mostly British, were interned in the Vauban barracks and another five hundred, old and sick, in the St. Jacques hospital close by. In early 1941, many of them were released, the rest were transferred to Vittel.
- Saint-Denis, near Paris. Located in the barracks, the camp was opened in June 1940 and remained in use until liberated by the United States Army in August 1944. Part of the grounds were surrounded by barbed wire to provide open space for exercise. In early 1942, there were more than 1,000 male British internees in the camp. The meagre food rations were augmented by the International Red Cross packages, so that overall their diet was satisfactory. Life was tolerable because there was a good library and recreation was provided by sports activities and theater.
- Vittel, Frontstalag 121 was located in requisitioned hotels in this spa near Epinal in the Vosges department. Most of the British families and single women were transferred here from Saint-Denis and Besançon. In early 1942, women over sixty, men over seventy-five and children under sixteen were released. The overall population was thus reduced to about 2,400. The inmates included a number of North-American families and women.

Although not architecturally conceived as an internment camp, the Vel' d'Hiv (Winter Velodrome) in Paris was used during the July 1942 Roundup. Most internment camps, however, were not conceived as such. The Vel d'Hiv was also used during the Algerian War (see below).

=== Colonial administration ===
Within the French colonial empire, the Vichy régime established labour camps (French: camps de travail) for Jews in Algeria and in Morocco. They included:

- Abadla, Algeria
- Ain el Ourak, Algeria
- Bedeau camp, Algeria
- Bechar, Algeria
- Berguent
- Bogari
- Bouarfa, Morocco
- Djefa
- Kénadsa, Algeria
- Meridja, Algeria
- Missour, Morocco
- Tendrara, Morocco

=== The liberation ===
==== German prisoners of war ====
Camps were also used after the liberation to intern German prisoners. In Rennes, after General Patton's United States Third Army liberated the city on 4 August 1944, about 50,000 German prisoners were kept in four camps in a city of 100,000 inhabitants at the time.

In the Camp de Rivesaltes, the German prisoners worked extensively in the reconstruction of Pyrénées-Orientales, between May 1945 and 1946, 412 German prisoners of war died in the camp.

== After World War II ==
=== Indochina War ===
Internment camps were used to receive French from Indochina following the end of the Indochina War in 1954, as well as approximatively 9,000 Hungarian refugees following the Budapest insurrection of 1956 (in Annecy, Colmar—Caserne Valter—, in Gap, in Le Havre, in Metz—Caserne Raffenel, in Montdauphin, in Montluçon—Caserne de Richemond—, in Nancy (camp de Chatelleraud), in Poitiers, in Rennes, in Rouen, in Strasbourg—caserne Stirn—and in Valdahon). Humanitarian concerns largely intertwined with repressive aims, and internment restrictions and assistance given to populations varied widely (Hungarian refugees were better treated than French from Indochina).

=== Algerian War ===
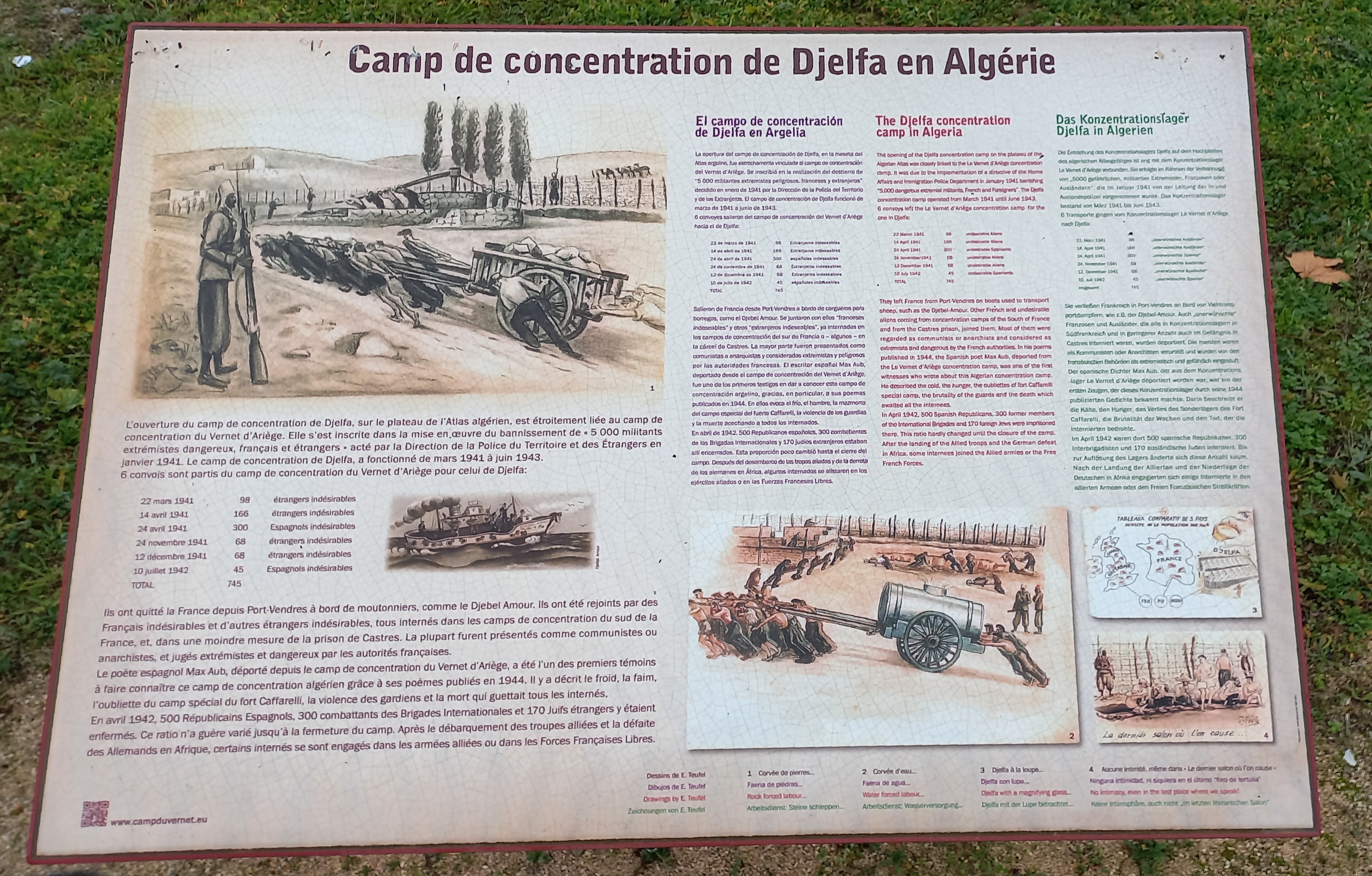
Memorial at Djelfa camp, Algeria

Internment was also put to use during the Algerian War (1954–1962), generally under the name of "camps de regroupement" ("regrouping camps"). Within Algeria, the colonial administration used a form of camps as a counter-insurgency tactic, with up to 2 million civilians being internally deported in villages de regroupement) to prevent their falling under the influence of the opposing FLN forces. were brought to French metropolitan territory.

In France, some camps used under Vichy were opened again, in Paris in particular, to hold suspected FLN and other Algerian independentists.

=== The Harkis ===
Internment camps were also used to intern the Harkis (Algerians who fought on the French Army's side) after the 19 March 1962 Évian Accords which put an official end to the war. Finally, the Camp de Rivesaltes in the Pyrénées-Orientales, and Bourg-Lastic in the Puy de Dôme, used to intern Jews, were also used to intern Harkis in the 1960s, and Kurdish refugees from Iraq in the 1980s.

== See also ==
- The Holocaust
- Collaboration with the Axis Powers

== Bibliography ==
- La SNCF sous l'Occupation allemande. Institut du temps présent, CNRS. 1996.
- Rajsfus, Maurice (2005). Drancy, un camp de concentration très ordinaire, 1941–1944. Le Cherche-midi éditeur. ISBN 2-86274-435-2.
- Steinbeck, Madeleine (January–March 1990). "Les camps de Besançon et de Vittel". Le Monde Juif. 137.
- Fontaine, Thomas (2005). Les oubliés de Romainville. Un camp allemand en France (1940–1944). Paris: Taillandier. ISBN 2-84734-217-6.
- Peter Gaida, Camps de travail sous Vichy, Lulu Press 2014
