= Harki =

Term for Muslim Algerians in the French Army in the Algerian War of Independence

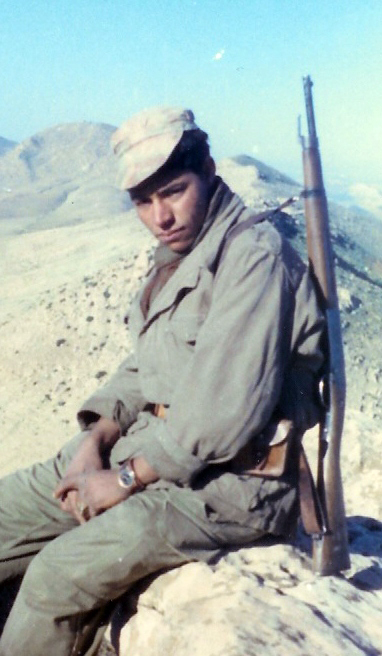
A young Harki, French Algeria. c. 1961

Harki (adjective from the Algerian Arabic "ḥarka", standard Arabic "ḥaraka" [حركة], "war party" or "movement", i.e., a group of volunteer militia) is the generic term for native Muslim Algerians who served as auxiliaries alongside the French Army during the Algerian War from 1954 to 1962. The word sometimes applies to all Algerian Muslims (thus including civilians) who supported French Algeria during the war. The motives for enlisting were mixed. They were regarded as traitors in independent Algeria and thousands of them were reportedly killed after the war in reprisals, despite the Évian Accords ceasefire and amnesty stipulations. President Charles de Gaulle controversially made the decision to not give the Harkis sanctuary in France, viewing them as "soldiers of fortune" who should be discharged as soon as possible.

In France the term can apply to Franco-musulmans rapatriés (repatriated French Muslims) living in the country since 1962—and to their metropolitan-born descendants. In this sense, the term Harki refers to a social group—a fraction of the French Muslims from Algeria—as distinct from other French of Algerian origin, or from Algerians living in France.

The French government wanted to avoid their massive resettlement in France. Early arrivals were interned in remote detainee camps and were victimized by endemic racism. By 2012, however, 800,000 Harkis, Pieds-Noirs and their descendants over the age of 18 lived in France. French President Jacques Chirac established 25 September 2001 as the Day of National Recognition for the Harkis. On 14 April 2012, President Nicolas Sarkozy recognized France's "historical responsibility" in abandoning Harki French Muslim veterans at the time of the war.

== Before the Algerian conflict ==
Muslim Algerians had served in large numbers as regular soldiers with the French Army of Africa from 1830 to 1962. Enlisting as spahis (cavalry) and tirailleurs (lit. skirmisher, i.e. infantry), they played an important part during the Franco-Prussian War of 1870 and especially during World War I (1914–1918), when 100,000 died in fighting against the Imperial German Army.

During World War II, after the rearmament of the French Army accomplished by the participation of the United States military in the North African campaign during 1942–1943, North African troops serving with the French Army numbered about 233,000 (more than 50% of Free France's effective force). They made a major contribution during Operation Dragoon (the 1944 liberation of Provence), and in the campaigns in Italy (French Expeditionary Corps) and Germany of 1944–45.

Tirailleurs from Algeria, Morocco and West Africa fought in French Indochina as part of the French Expeditionary Force until the Battle of Điện Biên Phủ in 1954.

== Algerian War ==
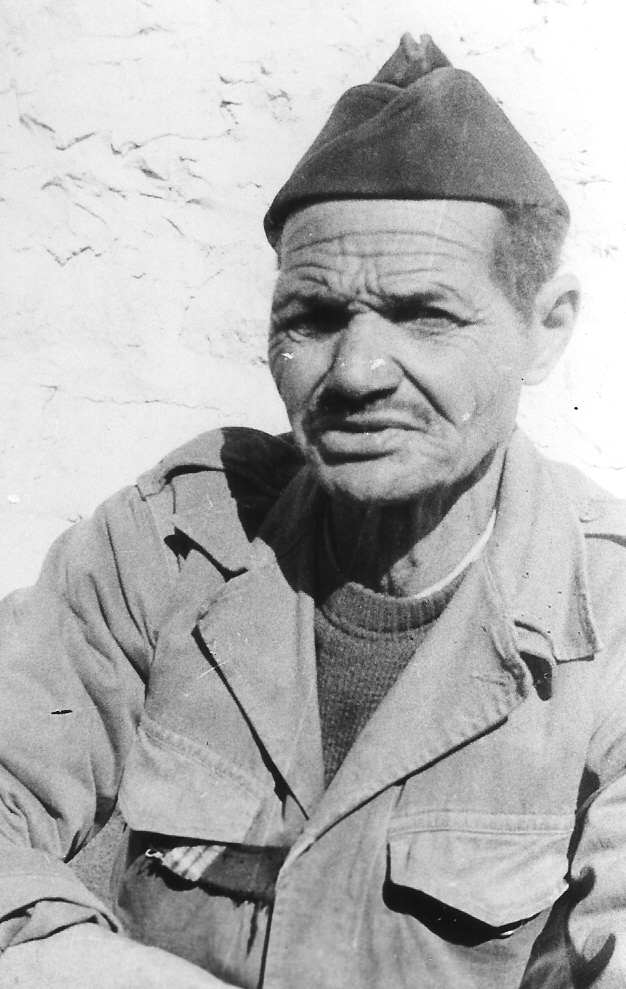
A World War II Harki veteran, French Algeria, c. 1961

With the outbreak of the Algerian War in 1954, the loyalty of the Muslim Algerian soldiers to France inevitably came under heavy strain. Some of the regular units were transferred from Algeria to France or Germany following increased incidents of desertion or small-scale mutiny.

As a partial replacement, the French administration recruited the Harkis as irregular militia based in their home villages or towns throughout Algeria. Initially raised as self-defence units, the Harkis, from 1956 on, increasingly served alongside the French Army in the field. They were lightly armed (often only with shotguns and antique rifles), but their knowledge of local terrain and conditions made them valuable auxiliaries to French regular units.

According to General R. Hure, by 1960 approximately 150,000 Muslim Algerians served in the French Army or as auxiliaries. In addition to volunteers and conscripts serving in regular units, this total took into account 95,000 Harkis (including 20,000 in separate mokhazni district police forces and 15,000 in commando de chasse tracking units).

French authorities claimed that more Algerian Muslims served with the French regular army than with the Algerian nationalist Front de Libération Nationale (FLN). According to US Army data, possibly compiled at a different date, the Harkis numbered about 180,000, more than the total FLN effectives. A 1995 study by General Faivre indicates that by 1961 about 210,000 Muslim Algerians served in the French Army or as auxiliaries, and a maximum of 50,000 in the FLN. A report to the United Nations dated 13 March 1962 gave an estimated total of 263,000 "pro-French Muslims" broken down to 20,000 regular soldiers, 40,000 conscripts, 78,000 Harkis and Moghaznis, 15,000 mobile group commandos and 60,000 civilian self-defense group members. The remaining 50,000 included Muslim government officials and veterans of the French Army.

The French civil administration used the Harkis as either home defence militia or as guerrilla-style field units, though mostly in conventional formations. They generally served either in all-Algerian units commanded by French officers seconded from the regular army or in mixed units. Others were employed in platoon- or below-sized units attached to French battalions. A third use involved Harkis in intelligence-gathering roles, with some reported minor false flag operations in support of intelligence collection.

The Harkis had mixed motives for working with the French. Unemployment was widespread amongst the Muslim population, especially in rural districts with a low level of literacy. Therefore, serving in irregular home defence or other auxiliary units alongside the French army, was seen as providing a stable livelihood. A principal motive for fighting on the side of the French was to provide for family and protect property, rather than strictly a patriotic devotion to France.

The FLN had also attacked members of rival nationalist groups as well as pro-French Muslim collaborators; and some Algerians enrolled in the Harkis to avenge the deaths of relatives who had been political opponents of the FLN. Others defected from the FLN rebel forces, persuaded by one means or another to change sides. Many Harkis came from families or other groups who had traditionally given service to France. From the viewpoint of Algerian nationalists, all Harkis were traitors; but at independence, the signatories of the March 1962 cease-fire ("Accords d'Evian" signed by France and the Algerian FLN), guaranteed that no one, Harkis or Pieds-noirs (Algerian-born Europeans with French nationality), would suffer reprisals after independence for any action during the war.

== Post-war abandonment and reprisals ==
In 1962 the French government of Charles de Gaulle originally ordered officials and army officers to block Harkis from following the pieds-noirs in seeking refuge in metropolitan France. William B. Cohen wrote:

There was little sympathy for the Harkis in the [French] government.... De Gaulle described the Harkis as 'soldiers of fortune' who served no purpose and should be got rid of as soon as possible. [Harkis] were not of interest to the French government because they were not French.

— William B. Cohen

Some officers of the French army disobeyed and tried to assist the Harkis under their command—as well as their families—to escape from Algeria. About 90,000 Harkis (including family members) found refuge in France.

On the other hand, the Organisation armée secrète, a far-right terror organisation, initiated a campaign of bombings in Algeria following the Évian Accords to block pieds-noirs from leaving the country.

As feared, widespread reprisals took place against those Harkis who remained in Algeria. It is estimated that the National Liberation Front (FLN) or lynch mobs in Algeria killed at least 30,000 and possibly as many as 150,000 Harkis and their dependents, sometimes in circumstances of extreme cruelty. In A Savage War Of Peace, the historian Alistair Horne wrote:

Hundreds died when put to work clearing the minefields along the Morice Line, or were shot out of hand. Others were tortured atrociously; army veterans were made to dig their own tombs, then swallow their decorations before being killed; they were burned alive, or castrated, or dragged behind trucks, or cut to pieces and their flesh fed to dogs. Many were put to death with their entire families, including young children.

— Alistair Horne

By 1961, there were about 400 Algerian Muslim officers in the French Army, although only one had achieved promotion to the rank of general. Originally the only official provision made for transferring serving Harkis to France had been for those who were willing to enlist in the regular French Army. Most Harkis were ineligible for this option because it applied only to single men within limited age categories.

The French government, concerned mainly with disengagement from Algeria and the repatriation of the pieds-noirs, disregarded or downplayed news of the massacres of Harkis. Charles de Gaulle appears to have been indifferent to the plight of the Muslim loyalists, according to Horne, who reported that the president remarked to one of their spokesmen "Eh bien ! vous souffrirez" ("Well then—you will suffer"). He also ignored the 1961 Paris massacre of Algerians by the National Police. On 19 March 1962. the responsible Minister of State. Louis Joxe, ordered attempts by French officers to transfer Harkis and their families to France to cease, followed by a statement that "the Auxiliary troops landing in the Metropolis in deviation from the general plan will be sent back to Algeria". After March 1962, the Algerian Muslim troops who were still serving as volunteers in the French Army were offered the option to continue serving under contract in France or elsewhere. Those who opted to be discharged and remain in independent Algeria were only occasionally subject to reprisals. Some leaders of the new Algerian Republic were veterans of the French Army, which prior to independence had provided one of the few avenues for advancement open to the Muslim majority in colonial society.

== Harki refugees in France ==
The French government did not plan for the Harkis after independence, and for some years it did not recognize any right for them to stay in France as residents and citizens. The Harkis were kept in "temporary" internment camps surrounded by barbed wire, such as the Camp de Rivesaltes (Joffre Camp) in Rivesaltes outside of Perpignan and in "chantiers de forestage"—communities of 30 Harki families on the outskirts of forests which the men maintained. The French government has since enacted various measures to help the Harki community (notably the 1994 Romani law and the 2005 Mekachera law); although in the views of community leaders these laws are often too little, too late.

The government of Jacques Chirac subsequently acknowledged these former allies, holding public ceremonies to commemorate their sacrifices, such as the 25 September 2001 Day of National Recognition for the Harkis. While active Harki associations in France continue working to obtain further recognition and aid in integrating into the society; they are still a largely un-assimilated refugee minority. For its part, the Algerian government does not recognize the Harkis as French citizens. It does not permit them to enter Algeria to visit their birth-places or family members left behind in that country.

Harkis are sometimes described in France as "Français par le sang versé" ("French by spilled blood").

Since Algerian independence, "Harki" has been used as a derogatory expression within Algeria. Amongst some of the Franco-Algerian community, Harkis have been likened to collaborators in France during the German occupation in World War II. Algerian historian Mohammed Harbi, a former FLN member, believes that comparison between Harkis and traitors or "collaborators" is not pertinent.

In July 2020, president Emmanuel Macron commissioned the French historian of Algerian-Jewish heritage Benjamin Stora to write a report and make his recommendations concerning the "memories of colonization and the Algerian War". This report was delivered to the French government in January 2021. In September 2021, Macron asked for "forgiveness on behalf of his country for abandoning Algerians who fought alongside France in their country's war of independence" and that France had "failed in its duty towards the Harkis, their wives, [and] their children".

== Other references ==
During the Algerian Civil War of 1991–2002, the Islamic fundamentalist insurgents used "harkis" as an abusive term for government police and soldiers.

In 2006, French politician Georges Frêche generated controversy after telling a group of Harkis in Montpellier that they were "subhumans". He later claimed he had been referring to a specific individual in the crowd, but was fined 15,000 Euros for the statement. Frêche was later expelled from the Socialist Party for his remarks.

Harkis were a distinct group from the Évolués, a sub-group of Algerians who became closely identified with the French, (or similar groups in other colonial territories), an Algerian or North African who assimilated closely to French culture through education, government service, and language.

By contrast, the Harkis were mostly culturally Algerian, speaking limited French, and largely indistinguishable from the majority of ordinary Algerians except for their service in French auxiliary military units. While many of the Évolués migrated to France during the Algerian Revolution, some remained in independent Algeria after 1962.

== See also ==
- ¡Harka! is a 1941 Spanish movie by Carlos Arévalo Calvet depicting Spanish officers serving alongside indigenous troops in Spanish Morocco.
- Historical revisionism (discussion on the highly controversial 23 February 2005 law on the "merits of colonization")
- List of French possessions and colonies
- French colonial empire

Similar organizations:

- Goumiers
- Philippine Scouts
- Regulares
- Razakars

== Bibliography ==
- Alistair Horne, A Savage War of Peace, 1978 ISBN 0-670-61964-7
- Edgar O'Ballance, The Algerian Insurrection 1954–62, 1967
- Martin Windrow, The Algerian War 1954–62 ISBN 1-85532-658-2
- Fatima Besnaci-Lancou, Benoit Falaize et Gilles_Manceron (dir.), Les harkis, Histoire, mémoire et transmission, préface de Philippe Joutard, Ed. de l'Atelier, septembre 2010.
- Fatima Besnaci-Lancou et Gilles_Manceron (dir.), Les harkis dans la colonisation et ses suites, préface de Jean Lacouture, Ed. de l'Atelier, février 2008.
- Fatima Besnaci-Lancou et Abderahmen Moumen, Les harkis, éd. Le cavalier bleu, collection Idées reçues, août 2008.
- Isabelle Clarke, Daniel Costelle et Mickaël Gamrasni, La blessure, la tragédie des harkis, Ed. Acropole, septembre 2010.
- Tom Charbit, Les harkis, Edition La découverte, Collection Repères, mars 2006.
- Vincent Crapanzano, The Harkis: The Wounds that Never Heal, pub. University Of Chicago Press, 2011, ISBN 978-0-226-11876-5.
- Guy Pervillé, "Le Drame des harkis", revue Histoire, avril 1988
- Jean-Jacques Jordi, La Réécriture de l'Histoire, actes du colloque du Centre universitaire méditerranéen de Nice, 1998.
- Mohand Hamoumou, Et ils sont devenus harkis, éd. Fayard, 1994 (réédité en 2001, épuisé).
- Mohand Hamoumou et Jean-Jacques Jordi, Les Harkis, une mémoire enfouie, Autrement, 1999.
- Elise Langelier, La situation juridique des Harkis (1962–2007), préface d'Emmanuel Aubin, éd. de l'Université de Poitiers, collection de la Faculté de Droit et des Sciences sociales de Poitiers, décembre 2009.
- Régis Pierret, Les filles et fils de harkis – Entre double rejet et triple appartenance, préface de Michel Wieviorka, Éditions L'Harmattan, Collection : Espaces interculturels, décembre 2008.
- Michel Roux, Les harkis, les oubliés de l'histoire, éd. la découverte, 1991.
- Abderahmen Moumen, Les Français musulmans en Vaucluse 1962–1991, Installation et difficultés d'intégration d'une communauté de rapatriés d'Algérie, Editions L'Harmattan, Collection Histoires et perspectives méditerranéennes, juillet 2003.
