= Josep Bartolí =

Catalan painter (1910–1995)

Josep Bartolí i Guiu
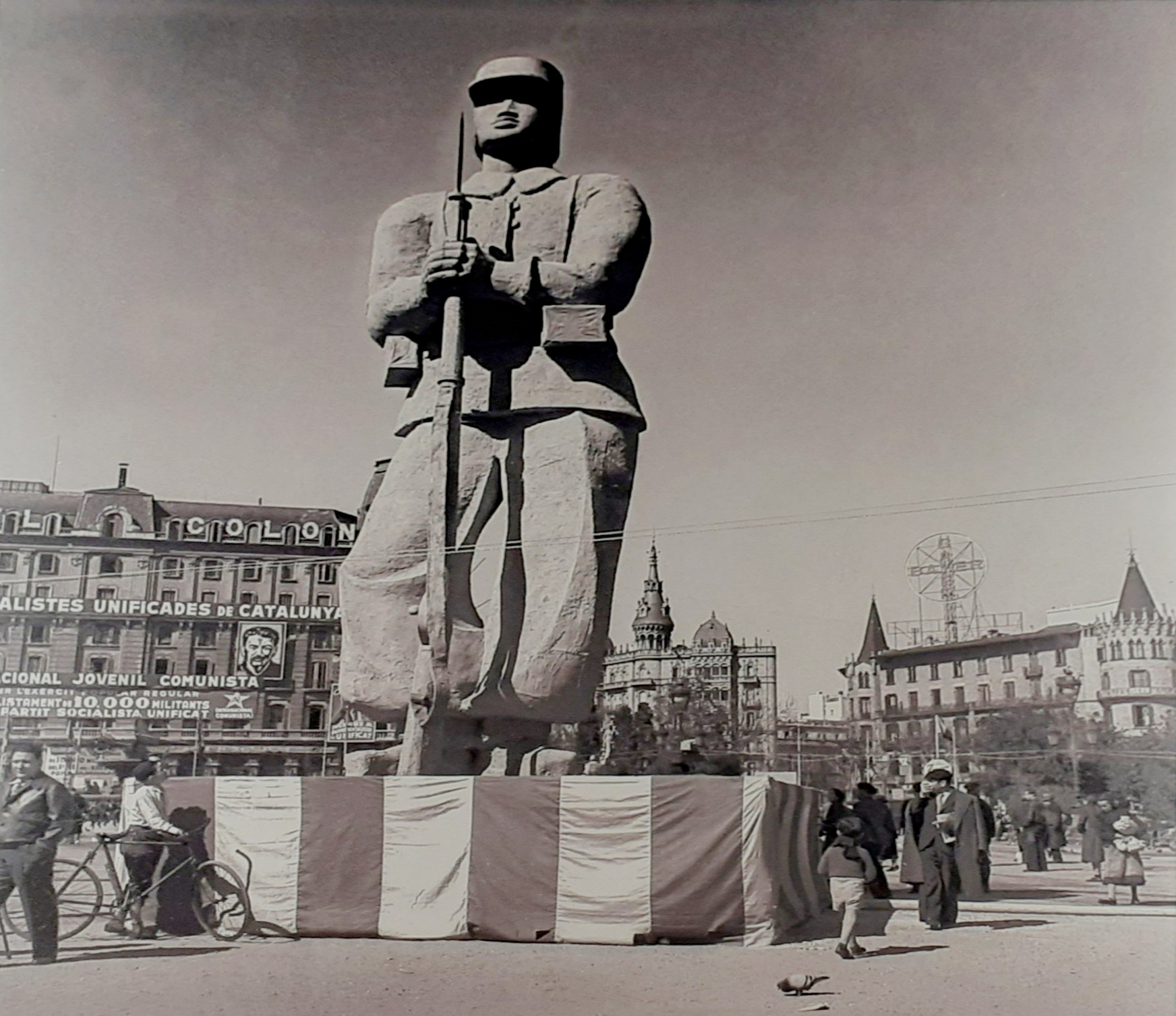
- Born: 30 June 1910; Barcelona
- Died: 3 December 1995 (aged 85); New York City
- Resting place: Ashes scattered in waters of Premià de Mar

Josep Bartolí i Guiu (1910-1995) was a Catalan painter, cartoonist and writer. He fought in the Spanish Civil War, and published a collection of drawings (Campos de Concentracion 1939-1943) from his time as a refugee in a French internment camp. He later travelled extensively, including to Mexico and the United States where he worked as a set designer and artist. In the 1950s he was a member of the 10th Street Group of artists, and in 1973 he won the Mark Rothko prize. His time in France was portrayed in the César Award winning 2020 film Josep, directed by French cartoonist Aurel.

== Biography ==
=== Spanish Civil War ===
While working as a newspaper illustrator, Bartolí was active in trade unions, helping to found a UGT affiliated illustrators' union. He later fought in Aragon with a unit of the Catalan Communist Party. In 1939 he crossed into France, and was incarcerated in a series of internment camps, including Bram, Argelès-sur-Mer and Le Barcarès.

Having escaped the camps to Paris, where he worked on costume and scenery design, Bartolí was subsequently arrested near Vichy and due to be transported to Dachau concentration camp. He was able to escape again, and made his way to Mexico via Casablanca, arriving in 1943.

=== Exile from Spain ===
While in Mexico in 1944, with some 20,000 fellow Spanish exiles, Bartolí first published his collection of drawings of life in the French camps.

In 1946, he moved to New York where he worked as a screenwriter, artist and writer, contributing to Holiday and The Reporter supplement of the Saturday Evening Post. He worked as a Hollywood set designer until he was blacklisted under McCarthyism. He also worked as an illustrator, contributing to French editions of Robinson Crusoe and Gulliver's Travels in the 1950s.

He would not return to Spain until the 1970s.

=== Personal life ===
In 1938 he met Maria Valdés. While pregnant, she died during a German aerial attack on her train as she attempted to leave Spain.

Bartolí met painter Frida Kahlo in 1946 and the two exchanged love letters for the next three years. A collection of these letters and poems sold for $137,000 in 2015.

He was survived in 1995 by his wife Bernice Bromberg, whom he had met in 1958.

=== Legacy ===
In 2020, a collection of works and sketchbooks were donated to the Camp de Rivesaltes Memorial. Other holders of his works include the Historical Archive of the City of Barcelona, following a 1989 donation.

His internment in France was portrayed in the César Award winning 2020 film Josep, directed by French cartoonist Aurel.

== Selected works ==
- Bartolí, José; Molins i Fábrega, N (1944). Campos de concentración, 1939-194 ... (in Spanish). Mexico City. OCLC 4330548.
- Bartoli, Joseph (1973). Proyecto de mural: the Black man in America (in Spanish). Mexicali: Juan Pablos Editor. OCLC 35146122.
- Bartoli, Joseph; Cañameras, Jaume (1990). Conversa amb Bartolí (in Catalan). Barcelona: Publicacions de l'Abadia de Montserrat. ISBN 978-84-7826-182-6. OCLC 28967383.
- Bartoli, Josep; Bartoli, Georges; Garcia, Laurence (2009). La Retirada: exode et exil des républicains d'Espagne (in French). Arles: Actes Sud. ISBN 9782742780402. OCLC 494642831.
