= Josep (film) =

2020 animated film

- Directed by: Aurel
- Written by: Jean-Louis Milesi (script)
- Produced by: Serge Lalou
- Starring: Sergi López; Bruno Solo; Gérard Hernandez; David Marsais
- Music by: Sílvia Pérez Cruz
- Production companies: Les Films d’Ici Méditerranée; Les Films du Poisson Rouge; In Efecto; Tchack; Les Films d’Ici; Lunanime; Promenons-nous dans les bois
- Distributed by: Sophie Dulac Distribution (France); Lumière (Belgium); Filmin Cinema (Spain)
- Release date: 30 September 2020
- Running time: 74 minutes
- Countries: France; Belgium; Spain
- Languages: French; Catalan; Spanish
- Box office: $1.3 million

Josep is a 2020 animated biographical film directed by Aurel (in his directorial debut) from a script by Jean-Louis Milesi, detailing the life of Catalonian cartoonist and revolutionary Josep Bartolí, following his experience during the Spanish Civil War, after the Second World War and his relationship with the Mexican painter Frida Kahlo. An international co-production between France, Belgium and Spain, the film was produced by Serge Lalou for Les Films d’Ici Méditerranée, in co-production with Les Films du Poisson Rouge, In Effecto, Tchack, Les Films d’Ici, Lunanime and Promenons-nous dans les bois.

Josep was set to premiere at the 2020 Cannes Film Festival in May 2020, however it was cancelled due to the COVID-19 pandemic. Subsequently, it premiered at the Annecy International Animation Film Festival in France on 22 June 2020, and was released theatrically in France on 30 September 2020. It received generally positive reviews from critics, and won several accolades, including the César Award for Best Animated Film and European Film Award for Best Animated Feature Film.

== Plot ==
In February 1939, artist Josep Bartolí had to flee his native Spain, which fell under Franco's dictatorship after the Spanish Civil War. Like thousands of other Spanish refugees, he went to France, but ended up in a concentration camp. The under-fed refugees are victims of ill-treatment. However, the artist befriends a gendarme (French military policeman) who secretly gives him a pencil and paper. Josep Bartolí eventually goes to New York and Mexico where he meets the painter Frida Kahlo, with whom he falls in love.

== Cast ==
- Sergi López as Josep Bartolí
- Bruno Solo as the military policeman (Serge)
- Gérard Hernandez as old Serge (Valentin's grandfather)
- David Marsais as Valentin
- Sílvia Pérez Cruz as Bertillia / Frida Kahlo
- Alain Cauchi as Leon
- François Morel as Robert
- Sophia Aram as the nurse
- Xavi Serrano as Helios Gómez
- Valérie Lemercier as Valentin's mother
- Thomas VDB as Valentin's father

== Release ==
Josep was originally set to premiere at the 2020 Cannes Film Festival in May 2020, however it was cancelled due to the COVID-19 pandemic. Subsequently, it premiered at the Annecy Film Festival in France on 22 June 2020. It was theatrically released in France on 30 September 2020, and grossed $1,373,465.

=== Reception ===
On the review aggregator website Rotten Tomatoes, 100% of 11 critics' reviews are positive Metacritic, which uses a weighted average, assigned the film a score of 77 out of 100, based on five critics, indicating "generally favorable" reviews.
