= French law on colonialism =

2005 act by the French National Assembly

The 23 February 2005 French law on colonialism (French: loi n° 2005-158 du 23 février 2005 portant reconnaissance de la Nation et contribution nationale en faveur des Français rapatriés, "Law No. 2005-158 of 23 February 2005 regarding recognition of the Nation and national contribution in favour of the French repatriates") was an act passed by the National Assembly, which imposed on high-school (lycée) teachers a requirement to teach the "positive values" of colonialism to their students (Article 4, Paragraph 2). The law, particularly the aforementioned paragraph and Articles 1 and 13, created a public uproar and drew massive opposition from the left, and Article 4, Paragraph 2 was repealed by president Jacques Chirac (UMP) at the beginning of 2006, after accusations of historical revisionism from various teachers and historians, including Pierre Vidal-Naquet, Claude Liauzu, Olivier Le Cour Grandmaison and Benjamin Stora. Its Article 13 was also criticized as it supported former Organisation armée secrète (OAS) militants.

== Context ==
At the end of Algerian War, upon independence in 1962, 900,000 European-Algerians (Pieds-noirs) fled to France within a few months in fear of the FLN's revenge. The French government was totally unprepared for the vast number of refugees, which caused turmoil in France. The majority of Algerian Muslims who had worked for the French were disarmed and left behind as the treaty between French and Algerian authorities declared that no actions could be taken against them. However, the Harkis in particular, having served as auxiliaries with the French army, were regarded as traitors by the FLN and between 50,000 and 150,000 Harkis and family members were murdered by the FLN or by lynch-mobs, often after being abducted and tortured. About 91,000 managed to flee to France, some with help from their French officers acting against orders, and as of 2016 they and their descendants form a significant part of the Algerian-French population.

== Article 4 on the "positive role of the French presence abroad" ==
The controversial Article 4 asked teachers and textbooks to "acknowledge and recognize in particular the positive role of the French presence abroad, especially in North Africa". This was considered by the left-wing and many in the former colonies as a denial of the problems of colonialism. There was rising antagonism both nationally and internationally until the law was repealed at the start of 2006. Abdelaziz Bouteflika, president of Algeria, refused to sign the envisioned "friendly treaty" with France because of this law. On 26 June 2005, he declared that the law "...approached mental blindness, negationism and revisionism." Famous writer Aimé Césaire, leader of the Négritude anti-colonialist literary movement, also refused to meet then-UMP leader Nicolas Sarkozy. The latter cancelled his visit to the overseas department of Martinique, where a thousand people demonstrated against him in Fort-de-France. Sarkozy was elected president in 2007.

UMP deputy Christian Vanneste was criticized for having introduced the expression "rôle positif" (French for "positive values") in the text. On 25 April 2005, more than a thousand professors and thesis students had signed the petition "Colonisation: No to the teaching of an official history". MP Christiane Taubira called the law "disastrous" and enacted because of lobbying from the harkis and the Pieds-Noirs, remaining silent on the Indigenate Code or forced labour in the former colonies.

== Partial repeal ==
Supporters of the law were decried as a resurgence of the "colonial lobby", a term used in late 19th-century France to label people (deputies, scientists, businessmen, etc.) who supported French colonialism. In defiance of this revisionism, Chirac finally turned against his own UMP majority that had voted for the law, and declared: "In a Republic, there is no official history. Writing history is the business of historians: it should not be circumscribed by laws." He passed a decree charging the president of the Assembly, Jean-Louis Debré (UMP), with modifying the controversial law, to take out the revisionist article. In order to do so, Chirac ordered Prime minister Dominique de Villepin to refer the matter to the Constitutional Council, hoping the decision would allow such a decree to repeal the law. The Constitutional Council indeed decreed that the regulation of history textbooks is an administrative matter, not a legal one, and as such, the contested amendment was repealed at the beginning of 2006.

== History and the law ==
In a tribune Liberty for History, 19 historians (including Élisabeth Badinter, Alain Decaux and Marc Ferro) demanded the repeal of all "historic laws": not only the 23 February 2005 Act, but also the 1990 Gayssot Act against "racism, xenophobia and historical revisionism", the Taubira Act on the recognition of slavery as a "crime against humanity", and the law recognizing the Armenian genocide. Historians found this demand controversial. While many agreed that the state should not be determining history, few believed that the previous acts had to be repealed. Some opposed the Gayssot Act and other laws, but thought repealing them would be perceived as a kind of condemnation of the ideas.

== Un passé qui ne passe pas (A past that never passes) ==
The debate on the 23 February 2005 law was linked to a wider debate in France concerning colonialism and current issues of immigration. As the historian Benjamin Stora pointed out, people interested in colonialism have a major "memory" stake in influencing the way various communities and the nation represent themselves. Official state histories generally have a hard time accepting the existence of past crimes and errors. The Algerian war of independence (1954–1962), characterized at the time by the French government as a "public order operation", was only recognized as a "war" in 1999 by the French National Assembly. In the same sense, philosopher Paul Ricœur (1981) has said that there has to be a "decolonization of memory", because mentalities themselves have been colonized during the "Age of Imperialism".

== See also ==
- List of French possessions and colonies
