= Camp de Rivesaltes =

French military camp during World War II

Coordinates: 42°48′03″N 2°52′13″E

- Transit camp
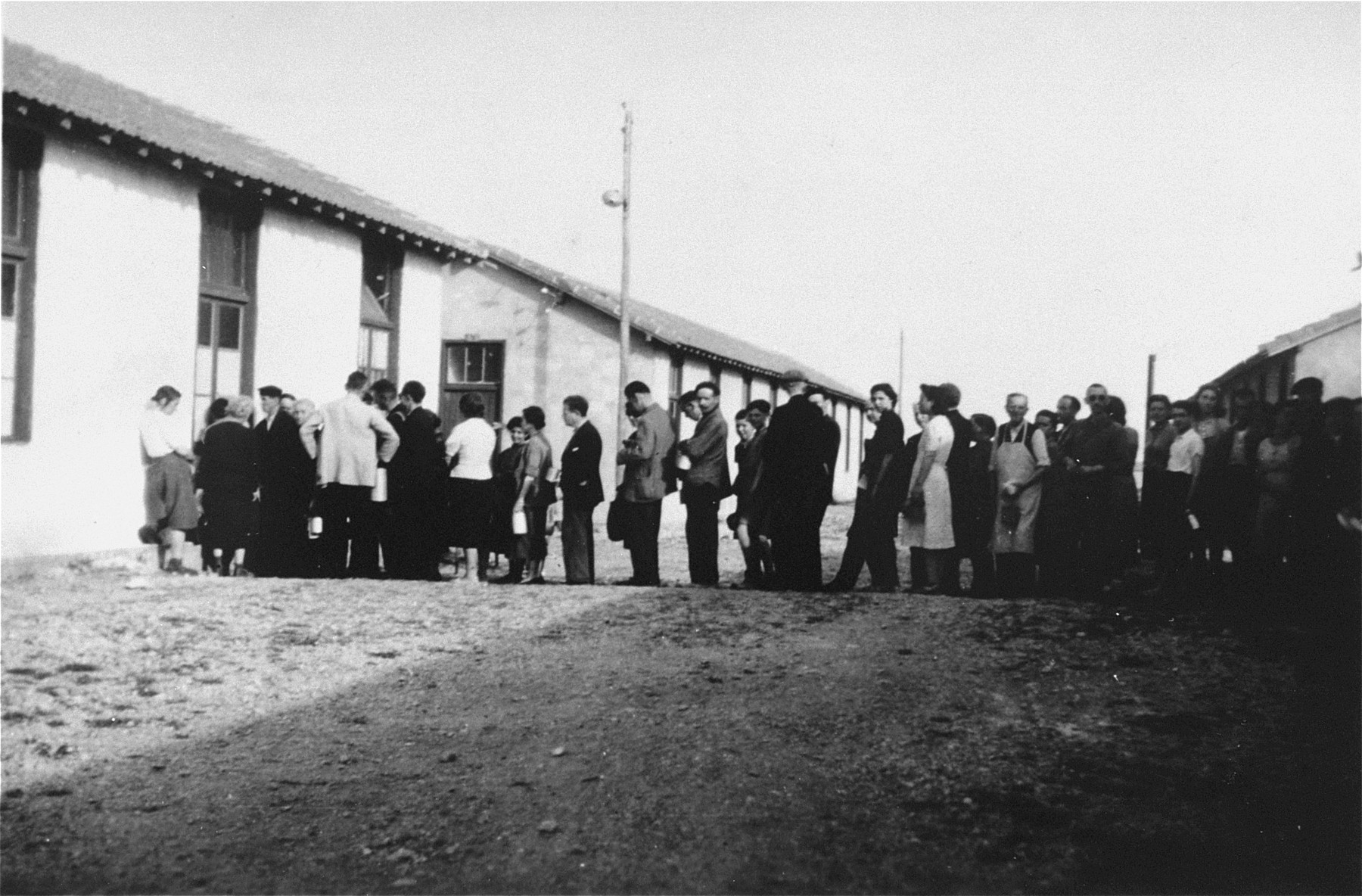
- Prisoners in Rivesaltes queuing for food distributed by relief agencies

- Location within France
- Location: Rivesaltes, Pyrénées-Orientales; Vichy France
- Operated by: French Police; German authorities
- Original use: Refugee camp
- Operational: 14 January 1941 – 19 August 1944
- Inmates: Spanish nationals, French and Foreign Jews, Romas
- Number of inmates: 8,000 (April 1941)

The Camp de Rivesaltes, also known as Camp Joffre, was an internment and transit camp in the commune of Rivesaltes in the department of Pyrénées-Orientales of the French Southern Zone during World War Two. Between August 11 and October 20, 1942, 2,313 foreign Jews, including 209 children were transferred from Rivesaltes via the Drancy internment camp to the Nazi extermination camp Auschwitz, where they were murdered. Serge Klarsfeld described the camp as the Drancy of the Southern Zone.

Since 2015, the site has been the Mémorial du Camp de Rivesaltes, a museum and memorial documenting the history of the site.

== History ==
In 1935, the commune of Rivesaltes, situated on a rail route 40 km from the Spanish border, was considered a strategic position for the French army, which took over 612 hectares between Rivesaltes and Salses, 5 km from the city of Rivesaltes, to construct a camp. It was originally intended to be used as a military base. At the same time, southern France became a major haven for Jewish refugees attempting to flee to neutral countries, whether legally or illegally.

=== Creation (1938–1940) ===
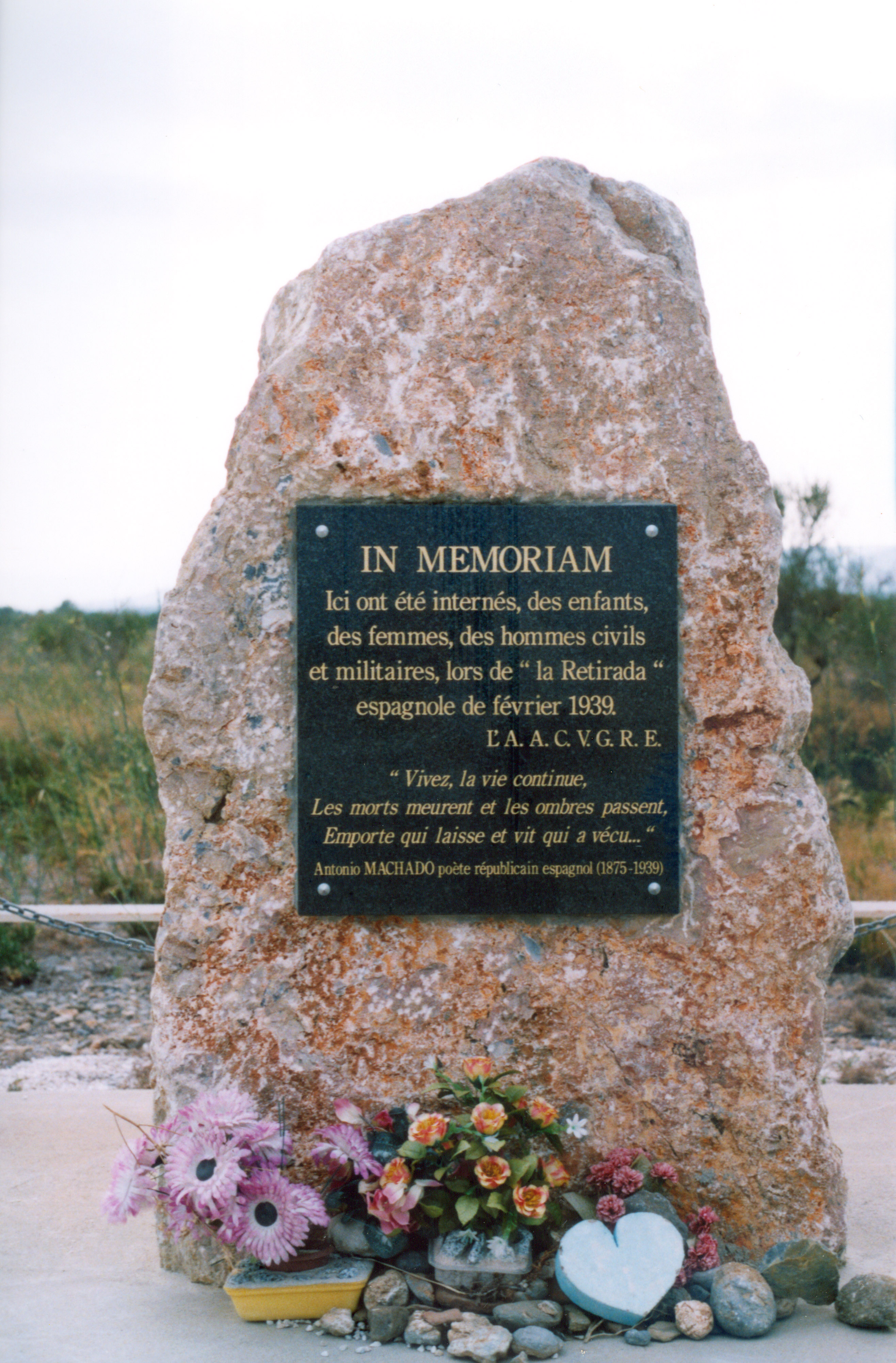
Commemorative stele for survivors of the Spanish Civil War

The military camp was built in 1938, a few miles from Perpignan. Four-fifths of the camp was situated within the commune of Rivesaltes and one-fifth within the commune of Salses. The camp was named "Camp Joffre" after General Joseph Joffre, the commander-in-chief of the French army during World War I.

Following the Retirada (the exodus of about half a million refugees from Spain to France in early 1939 at the end of the Spanish Civil War), the French government decided to use Camp Joffre to intern more than 15,000 Catalan refugees. This decision was never fully put into action, although a small influx of Catalan refugees was held there in 1939.

On December 10, 1940, the Ministry of Defense set aside 600 acres (2.4 km^{2}) south of the camp to house people expelled from Germany. The military camp was then run in parallel with the civilian camps.

In 1939, at the start of World War II, the camp became a military transit base, and in 1940 a refuge for Spanish refugees fleeing from Francoist Spain. After the signing of the armistice, France was split into two. The zone libre ("free zone"), in which the Pyrénées-Orientales was included, came under the administration of the Vichy government.

Gradually, the Joffre camp became a place of internment for families of gypsies, Jews and Spanish refugees. With a capacity of 8000, before long the camp became overcrowded, families were separated, and conditions deteriorated greatly.

=== Accommodation center (1941–1942) ===
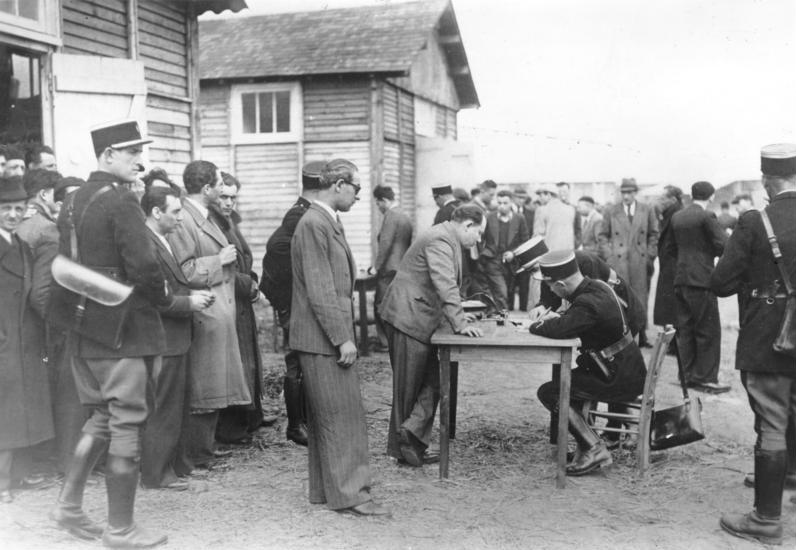
French Police checking new inmates in the camp Pithiviers

When the first internees arrived on January 14, 1941, the status of the camp was not yet settled. It was decided to make it an "accommodation center" for families. Initially planned for a maximum of 17,000 "guests", it included 150 large barracks with a capacity of 10,000 individuals. Families were divided between barracks: there were barracks for men, others for women and children. By May 31, 1941, the camp had 6,475 internees from 16 nationalities; Spaniards constituted more than half of them, and Jewish refugees from other countries more than a third.

=== Transit camp (1942) ===
France under German occupation (Nazis occupied the southern zone starting in November 1942 — Operation Case Anton). The green zone was under Italian administration.

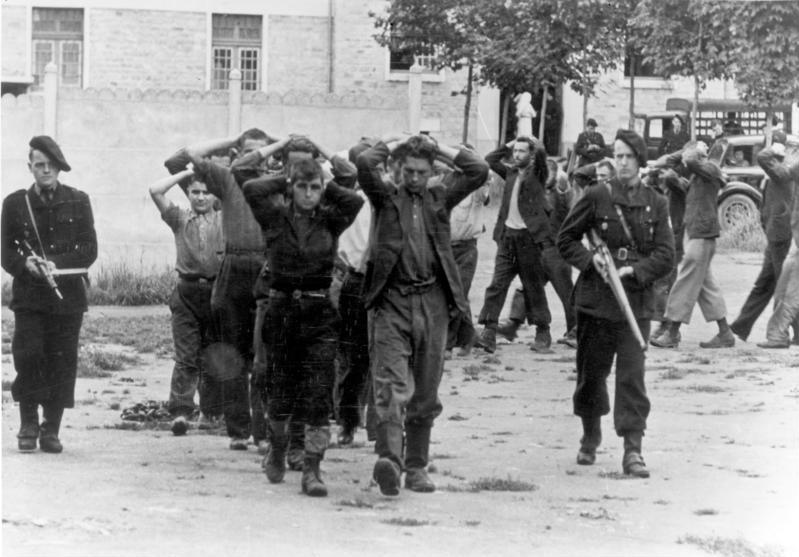
French milice and resistants

At five o'clock in the morning on August 26, 1942, the foreign Jews in the southern zone were rounded up and taken to the Centre national de rassemblement des Israélites at Rivesaltes. This "center" was newly established in the camp, in blocks J (for women and children), F (for men; this block had previously been reserved for workers) and K (reception, screening and sorting). It was planned as a transit camp for a total of 10,000 internees who would be housed there for 15 days before being deported. The 1,176 Jews already in the camp prior to the round-up were included in this count.

Convoys left Rivesaltes for Drancy internment camp on August 11 (400 people), August 23 (175 people), September 1 (173 people), September 4 (621 people), September 14 (594 people), September 21 (72 people), September 28 (70 people), October (101 people) and October 20 (107 people).

Serge Klarsfeld called the Rivesaltes camp "the Drancy of the free zone", noting that from September 4 to October 22 it played the same role as the Drancy camp in the occupied zone: a transit camp for deportees whose ultimate destination was the Nazi extermination camps. Rivesaltes was, during that time, the camp where the Jews arrested in the so-called "free zone" were gathered, and from which many of them (about 1,700) were sent to Drancy itself.

In November 1942, as Germany invaded the previously unoccupied southern zone of France, German troops moved into Camp Joffre, and it was closed as an internment camp on November 25. There were 277 staff members when it closed.

During those two years, the camp of Rivesaltes housed about 21,000 internees; about 5,714 of them were interned in the "special camp" or transit camp, of whom 2,313 were sent to Drancy and 2,251 were excluded from deportation by the screening committee. A further 215 internees died in the camp, including 51 children one year old or younger.

=== Guarded residence center (1944–1946) ===
The German army left Rivesaltes on August 19, 1944. While the military part of Rivesaltes camp resumed its original purpose, a new "guarded residence center" was established there on September 12, 1944. Located chiefly in block Q, this center housed people interned under the Vichy regime's épuration ("purification") policy. It had a maximum capacity of 1,080 internees.

The center continued to receive people from other European countries: Spaniards interned for crossing the border illegally were put to work to secure the center, and in January and March 1945 several hundreds of Soviet prisoners of war arrived.

The closing of the center was decided upon on December 10, 1945, and completed early in October 1946.

=== Prisoner-of-war depot (1944–1948) ===
The military authority transformed the camp into Depot No. 162 for prisoners of war. Housing mostly German and Italian soldiers, this camp held less than 10,000 prisoners in October 1944, and between 6,000 and 7,000 men in May 1945. It closed on May 1, 1948. The prisoners worked extensively on the reconstruction of the Roussillon region. Between May 1945 and 1946, 412 German prisoners of war died in the camp.

== Post Second World War ==
This facility continued to be used after the events of the Second World War. The Algerian war was the next opportunity to use the facility to detain people.

=== Algerian war (1962) ===
Under the stiffening of the French state caused by the Algerian War, the French government planned in 1957 to create an internment camp on the site. The Prefect tried to dissuade them because, in addition to a training center populated mainly by North Africans, the site contained a Professional Military Training Center particularly for North Africans and young soldiers mobilized for war. The plan was not carried out in its entirety, but a prison was set up discreetly for people convicted of supporting Algerian independence, and 527 prisoners were held there between March 9 and April 18, 1962.

=== Transit and rehabilitation camp (1962–1977) ===
==== Harkis ====
Harkis is the generic term for Muslim Algerians serving as auxiliaries with the French Army during the Algerian War (1954–1962).

In June 1962, the 1st regiment of Algerian riflemen was repatriated to Camp Joffre. They brought with them hundreds of civilians, women and children running away from the new independent Algeria. In October 1962, about 8000 Harkis were staying at the transit and rehabilitation camp of Rivesaltes (including those from the camp of Larzac and Bourg-Lastic). In all, according to the calculations of Abderahmen Moumen, about 20,000 people passed through and accumulated in the camp from 1962 to 1964. The stay varied from a few days for some families to years for others.

Families considered "irretrievable"—a term used by administrators at the time—were sent at the end of 1964 to the Saint-Maurice-l'Ardoise military camp in the Gard until 1975. Several hundred more families who had employment but no housing were accommodated in a "civil village" in the Rivesaltes camp during the 1960s. In 1963, a forestry village was also created in Rivesaltes for about 25 families of former auxiliaries (about a hundred people). The next decade saw the bulk of this population moved to the HLM (rent-controlled housing) of Réart, built in the city of Rivesaltes to finalize the situation of these families. The last residents left the camp in February 1977.

==== Colonial auxiliaries ====
Other French Colonial Forces and auxiliaries from Africa and French Indochina came, accompanied by civilians, with the decolonization of the French colonial empire: from 1964 to 1966 about 600 Guineans arrived, and other former soldiers and their families came from French Indochina.

== Immigration detention center (1986–2007) ==
In 1986 an administrative detention center was created, initially to detain Spanish nationals who had entered French territory illegally. With Spain's admission to the EEC it transitioned to holding undocumented migrants from other countries. It was closed in 2007 with the opening of a new site nearer Perpignan.

== The Rivesaltes memorial museum ==
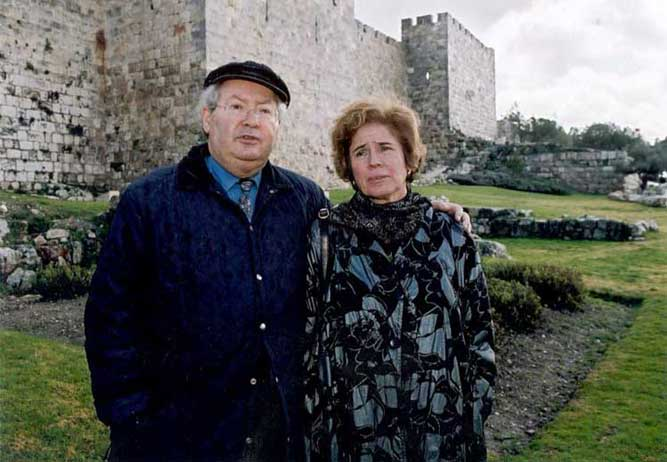
Serge and Beate Klarsfeld

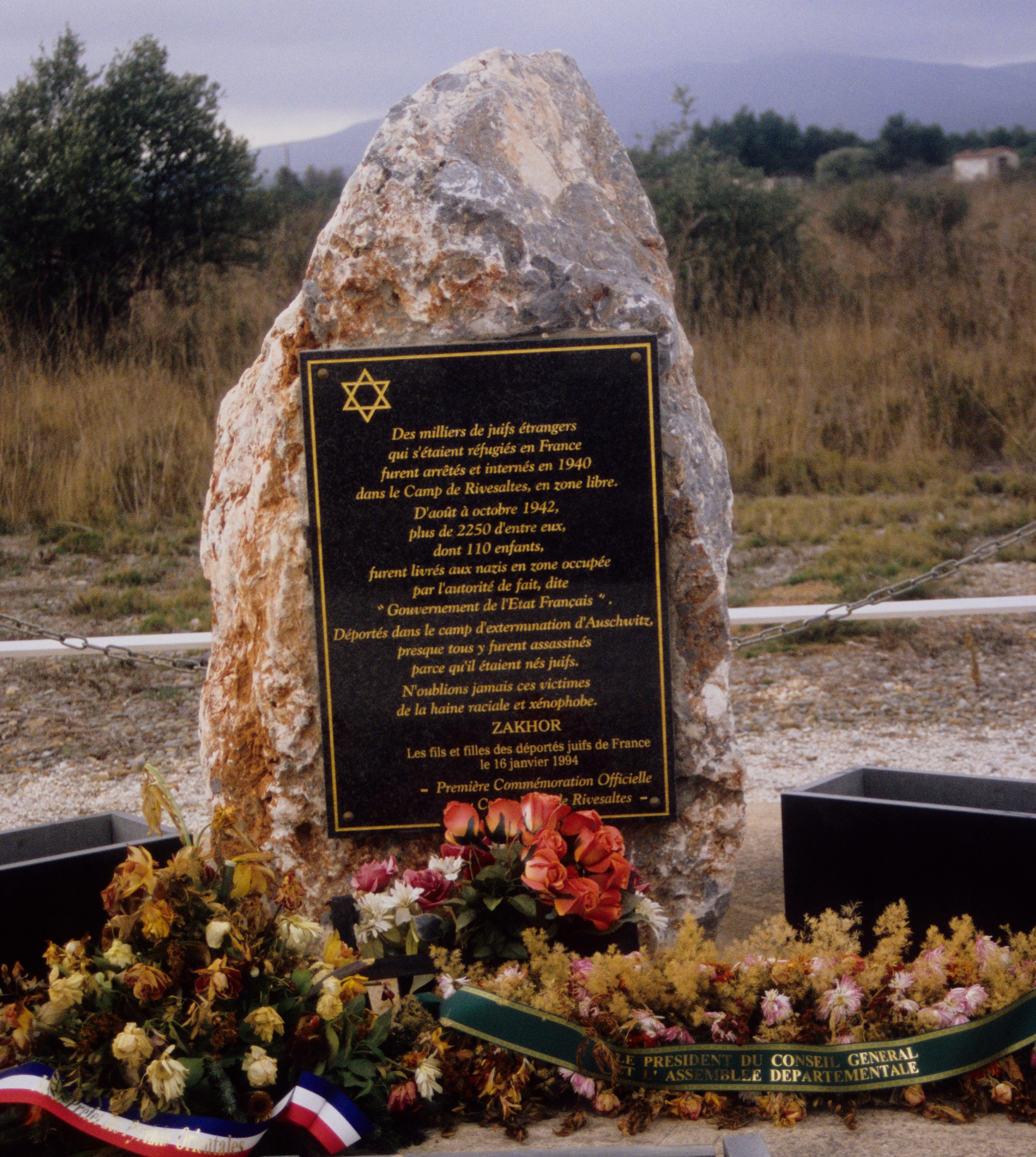
A Commemorative stele for the Jewish victims of the Rivesaltes camp erected by the "sons and daughters of Jews deported from France". Unveiled on January 16, 1994.

In the 1990s, a series of publications and memorials ultimately lead to the 2015 opening of a museum and memorial, known in French as the Mémorial du Camp de Rivesaltes.

=== History ===
==== Early memorials ====
Two 1993 publications brought attention to the experience of Jews at Rivesaltes. Serge Klarsfeld published The transfer of Jews from the camp of Rivesaltes and the Montpellier area towards the center of Drancy for deportation on August 10, 1942, a list of deported Jews and Jews who had died in the camp of Rivesaltes. Friedel Bohny-Reiter's Journal de Rivesaltes, 1941-1942 described life as a nurse during deportations.

On 16 January 1994, Klarsfeld's association, Sons and Daughters of Jewish Deportees from France, erected a monument to the memory of 2,313 Jews deported from the Rivesaltes camp to Auschwitz, On 2 December the following year a monument to the Harkis was installed. In 1999 a monument to Spanish Republicans was erected. These were followed by commemorations of gypsies and illegal immigrants in 2008 and 2009.

==== Establishment of a museum ====
In 1997, following the discovery of part of the camp's archives in a rubbish dump, a collective petition "To the living memory of the camp of Rivesaltes" (Pour la mémoire vivante du camp de Rivesaltes) was signed by Simone Veil, Claude Simon, Edgar Morin and over a thousand other citizens, to protest against the camp's threatened destruction. This gave backing to Christian Bourquin, the new president of the General Council of the Pyrénées-Orientales, and his opposition to the destruction of the site. A public consultation on the project was started in 1998.

In 2000, the French Ministry of Culture included the site in its supplementary list of monuments historiques, and part of the land was purchased from the French government by the General Council of the Pyrénées-Orientales.

In 2005, on the French Heritage Day, part of the camp was opened to the public for the first time. In November of the same year, the General Council of the Pyrénées-Orientales acquired F block on the site, covering about 42 hectares.

In January 2006, Rudy Ricciotti won an architecture competition for the memorial project, which Robert Badinter agreed to sponsor. On January 21, 2009, the construction permit was filed. Work was expected to start in 2010 and take two years. On 16 October 2015, the site was inaugurated by French Prime Minister Manuel Valls.

In 2020, 270 works by the Catalan artist Josep Bartolí, who was interned at the camp, were donated to the museum by his family.

== See also ==
- Concentration camps in France
- Camp du Récébédou
- Camp Gurs
- Camp Vernet

== Sources ==
- Megargee, G.P.; White, J. (2018). The United States Holocaust Memorial Museum Encyclopedia of Camps and Ghettos, 1933–1945, Volume III: Camps and Ghettos under European Regimes Aligned with Nazi Germany. Indiana University Press. ISBN 978-0-253-02386-5.
