= Claude Liauzu =

French historian

Claude Liauzu (April 24, 1940 in Casablanca, Morocco – May 23, 2007), was a French historian specializing in the history of colonialism. He was an ardent critic of the French law of February 23, 2005 of the teaching of French colonial empires describing the colonization positively. He was professor at the Sorbonne (Université de Paris VII - Denis-Diderot).

== Works ==
- Colonisation. Droit d’inventaire, Paris, Armand Colin, 2004
