= Maurice Rajsfus =

French historian (1928–2020)

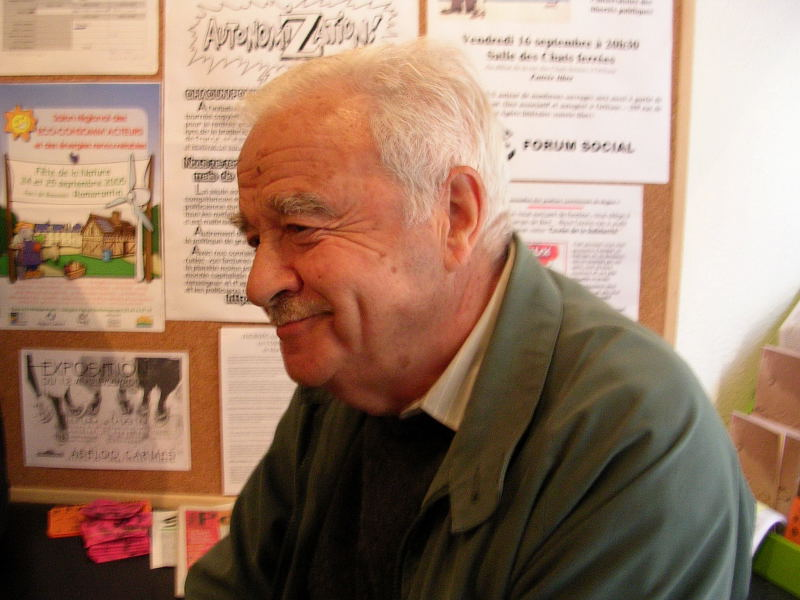
- Maurice Rajsfus in 2005
- Born: 9 April 1928; Aubervilliers, 93, France
- Died: 13 June 2020 (aged 92)
- Occupations: Historian; Journalist & Controversialist; Writer

Maurice Rajsfus (9 April 1928 – 13 June 2020) was a French writer, journalist, historian and anti-establishment militant. He was the author of numerous books addressing themes such as the Jewish genocide in France, the police, and attacks on civil liberties.

In 1994 he co-founded the "Observatory of Public Liberties" ("l'Observatoire des libertés publiques"), which he led.

== Life ==
=== Early years ===
Maurice Rajsfus was born in Aubervilliers on the north side of Paris. His parents were Polish Jews who had arrived in France in the early 1920s. Their marriage ceremony had been performed by the mayor of Aubervilliers, Pierre Laval, "still, back then, a pacifist lawyer".

A defining experience came in July 1942 when he was 14. In what came to be known as the Vel' d'Hiv Roundup more than 13,000 Jews were rounded up in and around Paris by French police and officials, to be held in appalling conditions in a velodrome before being shipped to the Auschwitz concentration camp. Rajsfus, his elder sister Jenny and his parents were included in the exercise. At the last minute, however, French Jewish children aged between 14 and 16 were released. The children never saw their parents again. Many years later, in 1988, he approached Marcel Mulot, one of the two policemen who had come to the house and arrested them on that occasion, in order to try and "understand". But the policeman replied that he was not interested in the discussion requested. Since 1988 Rajsfus has repeatedly recalled that brief discussion in interviews and published work, referring to the "Vichy police whose past today remains very much with us, without remorse and without memory" ("...police de Vichy au passé trop présent, sans remords et sans mémoire...").

=== After the war ===
Directly after the war he joined the Young Communists. However, two years later, in 1946 he was expelled for Hitlero-Trotskyism. He was active in the Fourth International before 1950, and then in the "Socialism or Barbarism" libertarian socialist group with Claude Lefort and Cornelius Castoriadis, mobilising the Youth Hostel Movement in opposition to the Algerian War after 1955.

Between 1991 and 1999 he was the president of the militantly anti-National Front group, Ras l'front.

=== "Observatory of Public Liberties" ===
One year after the killing, on 6 April 1993, of Makomé M'Bowolé by a "bullet grazing his head" while he was handcuffed and under interrogation at the Grandes Carrières police station, Maurice Rajsfus co-founded the "Observatory of Public Liberties" ("l'Observatoire des libertés publiques"), which produces a monthly bulletin entitled "Que fait la police?" ("What are the police doing?"), reporting incidents identified that involve perceived police violence.

For him the connection between the past and the present was seamless, especially when it came to monitoring the police: "They stole years of life from my parents. They all joined in those round-ups when required. Barely one of them resigned. If the French police had not submitted to those orders, so much damage would never have occurred. 250,000 were deported from France. 76,000 of those were Jews: most of the others were communists and gaullists....And what can you say about the policeman, writing a report to the prefecture, who dared to write on 22 July: "The Winter Velodrome has been cleared". There were still 50 sick Jews there, and items of lost property, all of which were transferred to the internee transit camp at Drancy."

=== Critique of Zionism ===
Rajsfus identified Zionism as a "project presented as "generous" by its instigators, intended to resolve persecution of Jews and racist pogroms" which "rapidly drifted into a similarly racist enterprise". He also denounced the use of the antisemitism accusation which he described as "a weapon raised against anyone who opposes Zionism, an active ideology that should not be allowed to face the least criticism".

In 1990 he published "Palestine: chronique des événements courants, 1988–1989" ("Palestine: Chronicle of Current Events") and "L'Ennemi intérieur : Israël-Palestine" ("The Enemy within: Israel-Palestine"), books in which he described Israel as "a democracy under high surveillance" and denounced abuses by the Israeli military.

=== Education ===
Having been orphaned and left school during the war when he was 14, he missed out on a structured secondary education. He nevertheless received a doctorate in Sociology in 1992.

Several times he was a jury member for the Big Brother Awards for France, and he wrote the preface for the book "Big Brother Awards. Les surveillants surveillés" ("...surveilling the surveillers" – 2008). But he did not have an academic background as an historian. As Pierre Vidal-Naquet wrote in the preface to a book by Rajsfus, "Between Maurice Rajsfus and myself I have to add another difference. I am, as he is not, a "professional historian", and I sometimes feel the need to discuss the way he deals with historical material, but dear historians – and I do not exclude myself here – we should have made a start".
