= Mohammed Harbi =

Algerian historian (1933–2026)

Mohammed Harbi

Mohammed Harbi (Arabic: محمد حربي; sometimes romanized as Mohamed; 16 June 1933 – 1 January 2026) was an Algerian historian who was a member of the National Liberation Front (Algeria) (FLN) during the Algerian War of Independence.

== Life and career ==
Mohammed Harbi was born on 16 June 1933 into a wealthy family in El Harrouch, Algeria. His father was a rural landowner and farmer. His family moved to Skikda in 1945 where he attended high school at the Collège Dominique-Luciani and was influenced by his history teacher, Pierre Souyri, a member of the leftist French Resistance during World War II. At the age of 15, he joined the Movement for the Triumph of Democratic Liberties, becoming the head of the party’s local youth wing in 1946. He completed high school at the Collège Sainte-Barbe in Paris and joined Sorbonne University in 1953 to study history. In August 1956, amidst the Algerian War of Independence, he joined the FLN Federation of France and worked in its Information and Press Commission. He became an advisor to Krim Belkacem and was assigned FLN ambassador to Guinea in 1960.

After the Algerian War of Independence, he became an advisor to the new president, Ahmed Ben Bella, and later a member of his cabinet. Harbi aided in the development of agricultural reform and policy under Ben Bella. In September 1963, he became an editor at the FLN newspaper Révolution Africaine.

Harbi's Marxism was fiercely opposed by many veterans of the war, as well as by the army. According to his memoirs, Harbi tried to resist the increasingly authoritarian approach of the new government and urged Ben Bella to arm the people to avert a military coup. He believed, like many Marxists in his generation, that popular militias were needed to revolutionise society as well as resist the impending coup. However, his own insistence on Marxist dogma helped fuel popular as well as political opposition toward him, which culminated in the very coup he had feared.

In June 1965, Houari Boumédiène seized power and arrested Ben Bella. Boumédiène offered Harbi several government positions, which he refused. Harbi was then arrested and transferred between prisons, without trial, until he was placed in house arrest in 1969. While detained at the Villa Bengana in Algiers, Harbi began writing his first book. In 1971, he escaped to Tunisia with a false Turkish passport and arrived in Paris in 1973. He spent the rest of his life residing in the Belleville neighborhood of Paris. Aux origines du FLN, le populisme révolutionnaire en Algérie (transl. The Origins of the FLN: Revolutionary Populism in Algeria 1975) and F.L.N.: mirage et realité (transl. The F.L.N.: Mirage and Reality 1980) were begun during his imprisonment and completed after fleeing to France. He released Les archives de la révolution algérienne (transl. The Archives of the Algerian Revolution in 1981. He released Le FLN, documents et histoire (transl. The FLN, Documents and History) with Gilbert Meynier and La guerre d'Algérie: 1954-2004. La fin de l’amnésie (transl. The Algerian War: 1954–2004. The End of Amnesia) with Benjamin Stora in 2004. In 2022, he released L’Autogestion en Algérie : Une autre révolution? (transl. Self-management in Algeria: Another revolution?) in collaboration with Robi Morder and Irène Paillard.

In France, Harbi began to teach political science in the University of Paris.

The first part of his memoirs was published in 2003.

Harbi died in Paris on 1 January 2026, at the age of 92.

== Personal life ==
Harbi was married to Djenett Regui Harbi until 1977. The couple had four children.

== Books ==
- Aux origines du Front de libération nationale (1975)
- F.L.N.: mirage et realité (1980)
- Les archives de la révolution algérienne (1981)
- Le FLN, documents et histoire (2004)
- La guerre d’Algérie: 1954-2004. La fin de l’amnésie (2004), with Benjamin Stora
- Une Vie Debout: Mémoires Politiques (2020)
