= Jean Lacouture =

French journalist, historian and author (1921–2015)

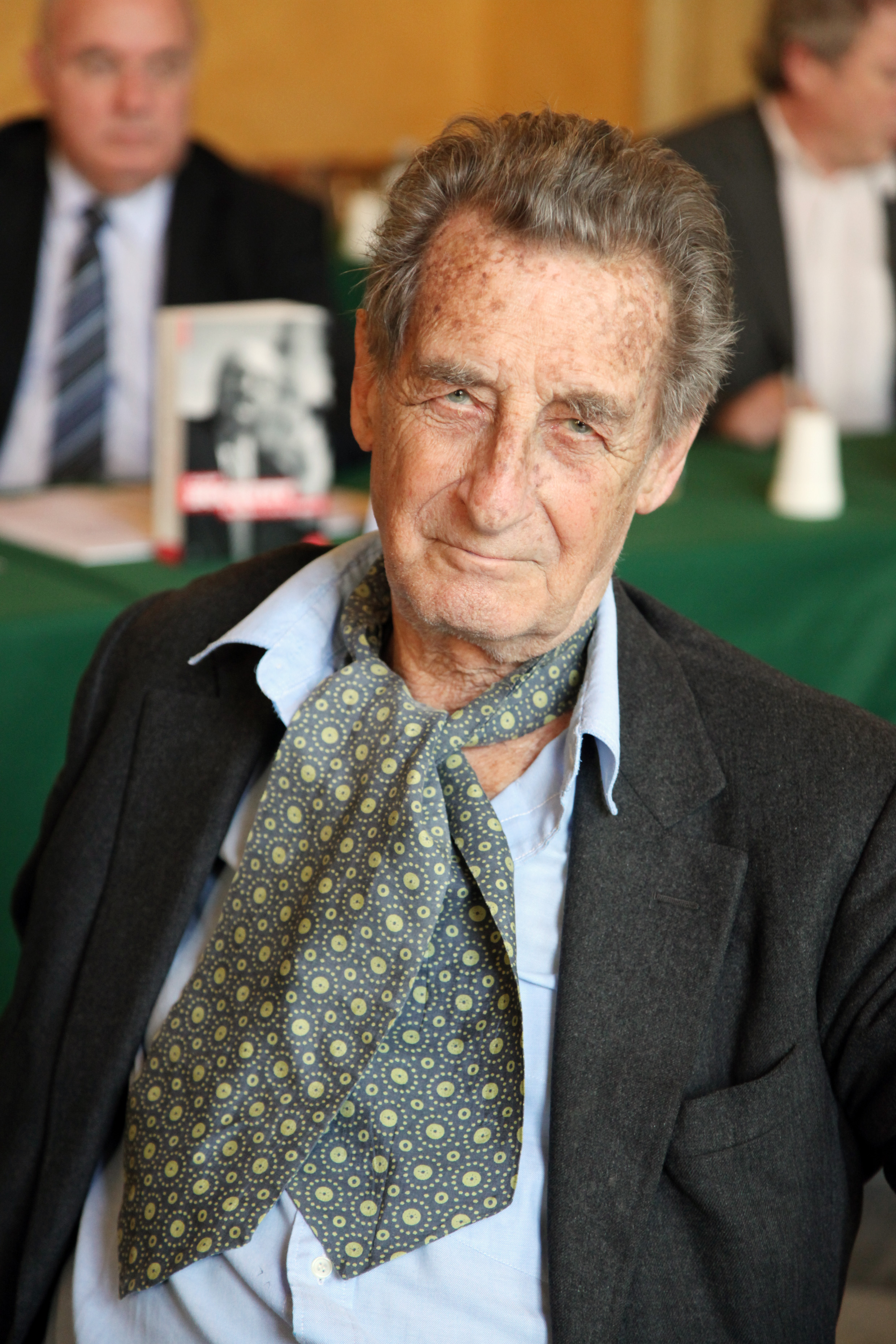
- Jean Lacouture in 2010
- Born: 9 June 1921; Bordeaux, France
- Died: 16 July 2015 (aged 94); Roussillon, France
- Occupations: Journalist, historian

Jean Lacouture (French pronunciation: [ʒɑ̃ lakutyʁ]; 9 June 1921 – 16 July 2015) was a journalist, historian and author. He was particularly famous for his biographies.

== Career ==
Jean Lacouture was born in Bordeaux, France. He began his career in journalism in 1950 in Combat as diplomatic editor. He joined Le Monde in 1951. In 1953, he worked in Cairo for France Soir, before returning to Le Monde as director for the overseas services, and grand reporter (one of the highest titles in French journalism) until 1975.

Politically engaged on the Left, Lacouture supported decolonisation, and Mitterrand from 1981. He worked for the Nouvel Observateur, and L'Histoire. He is interviewed in the 1968 documentary film about the Vietnam War entitled In the Year of the Pig.

Lacouture was also director for publication at Seuil, one of the main French publishers, from 1961 to 1982, and professor at the L'Institut d'Etudes Politiques de Paris (Sciences PO) between 1969 and 1972.

He was mainly known to the public because of his biographies, including the lives of Ho Chi Minh, Nasser, Léon Blum, De Gaulle, François Mauriac, Pierre Mendès France, Mitterrand, Montesquieu, Montaigne, Malraux, Germaine Tillion, Champollion, Jacques Rivière, Stendhal and Kennedy.

A dedicated music lover, Lacouture was also president of a society of devotees of Georges Bizet. In 2015 he died in Roussillon, France.

== Works ==
- Jesuits: A Multibiography ISBN 1-887178-60-0
- De Gaulle
  - De Gaulle: The Rebel 1890–1944 ISBN 0-393-30999-1
  - De Gaulle: The Ruler 1945–1970 ISBN 0-393-31000-0
- Robert Capa ISBN 0-679-72336-6
- Ho Chi Minh: A Political Biography ISBN 0-394-70215-8
- Vietnam: Between two truces ASIN B0006D759K
- Montaigne à Cavalo ISBN 85-01-04759-7
- Pierre Mendes France ISBN 0-8419-0856-7
- The demigods: Charismatic leadership in the third world ISBN 0-394-42194-9
- Nasser: A biography ISBN 0-394-46625-X
- Léon Blum ISBN 0-8419-0776-5
- J.F. Kennedy ISBN 2-09-754229-8
- "l’Égypte en mouvement"
