= Bourg-Lastic =

- Commune
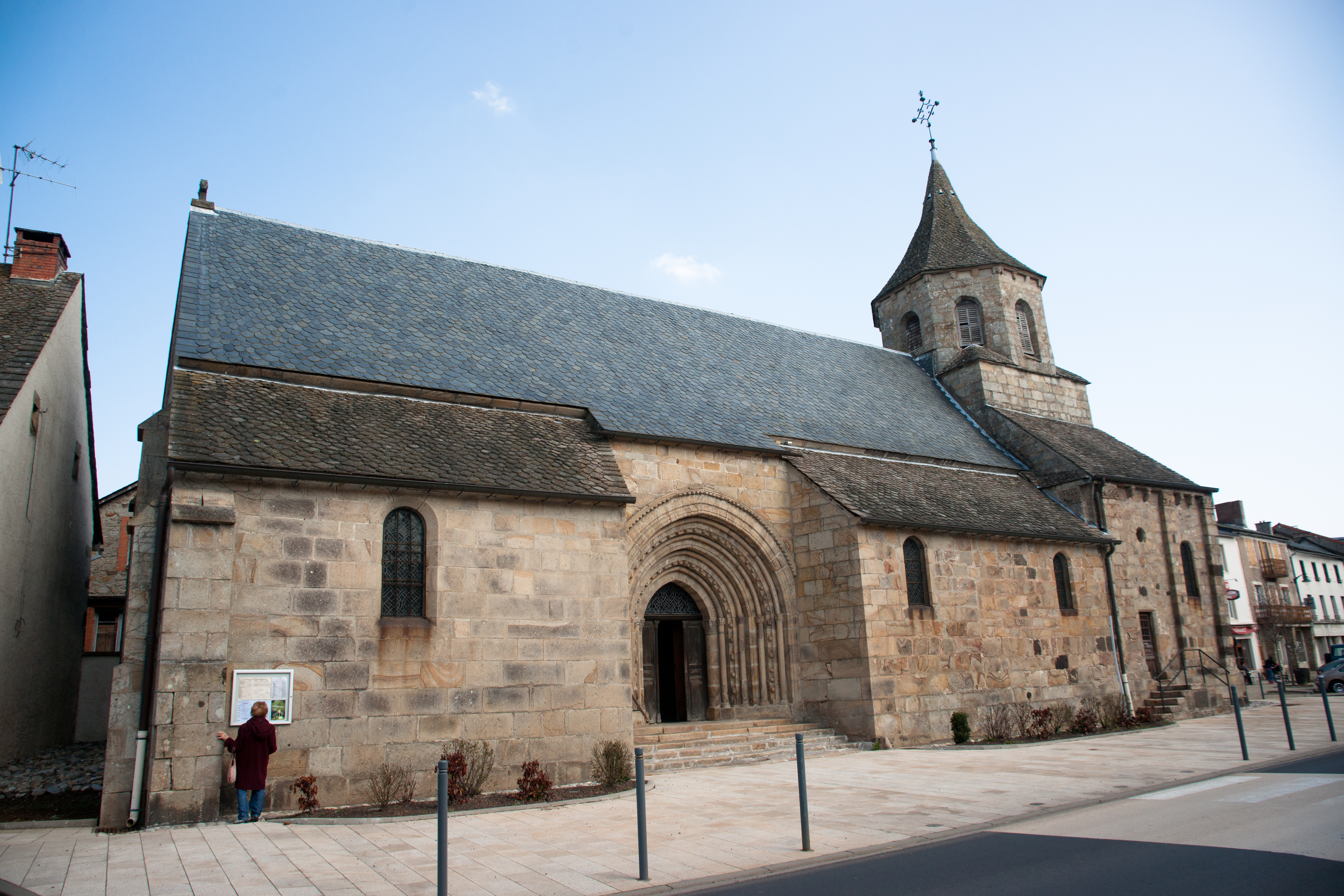
- Saint-Fargheon church.

- Coat of arms
- Location of Bourg-Lastic
- Location within France Location within Auvergne-Rhône-Alpes
- Coordinates: 45°38′53″N 2°33′33″E
- Country: France
- Region: Auvergne-Rhône-Alpes
- Department: Puy-de-Dôme
- Arrondissement: Riom
- Canton: Saint-Ours

Government
  - Mayor (2020–2026): Jean-François Bizet
- Area^{1}: 40.46 km^{2} (15.62 sq mi)
- Highest elevation: 931 m (3,054 ft)
- Lowest elevation: 637 m (2,090 ft)
- Population (2023): 874
  - Density: 21.6/km^{2} (55.9/sq mi)
- Time zone: UTC+01:00 (CET)
  - Summer (DST): UTC+02:00 (CEST)
- INSEE/Postal code: 63048 /63760
- ^{1} French Land Register data, which excludes lakes, ponds, glaciers > 1 km^{2} (0.386 sq mi or 247 acres) and river estuaries.

Bourg-Lastic (French pronunciation: [buʁ lastik]; Occitan: Lo Borg) is a commune in the Puy-de-Dôme department in Auvergne-Rhône-Alpes in central France.

== Geography ==
The Chavanon forms the commune's eastern border.

== Population ==
Historical population

Year	Pop.	±% p.a.
1793	2,065	—
1800	2,133	+0.46%
1806	2,088	−0.35%
1821	2,300	+0.65%
1831	2,707	+1.64%
1836	2,608	−0.74%
1841	2,759	+1.13%
1846	2,814	+0.40%
1851	2,404	−3.10%
1856	2,512	+0.88%
1861	2,579	+0.53%
1866	2,599	+0.15%
1872	1,740	−6.47%
1876	1,743	+0.04%
1881	1,601	−1.69%
1886	1,573	−0.35%
1891	1,612	+0.49%
1896	1,558	−0.68%
1901	1,582	+0.31%

Year	Pop.	±% p.a.
1906	1,571	−0.14%
1911	1,650	+0.99%
1921	1,545	−0.66%
1926	1,465	−1.06%
1931	1,361	−1.46%
1936	1,447	+1.23%
1946	1,221	−1.68%
1954	1,273	+0.52%
1962	1,310	+0.36%
1968	1,339	+0.37%
1975	1,168	−1.93%
1982	1,191	+0.28%
1990	1,069	−1.34%
1999	1,009	−0.64%
2007	955	−0.69%
2012	897	−1.25%
2017	877	−0.45%
2023	874	−0.06%

Source: EHESS and INSEE

== See also ==
- Communes of the Puy-de-Dôme department
