= Benjamin Stora =

French historian, expert on North Africa (born 1950)

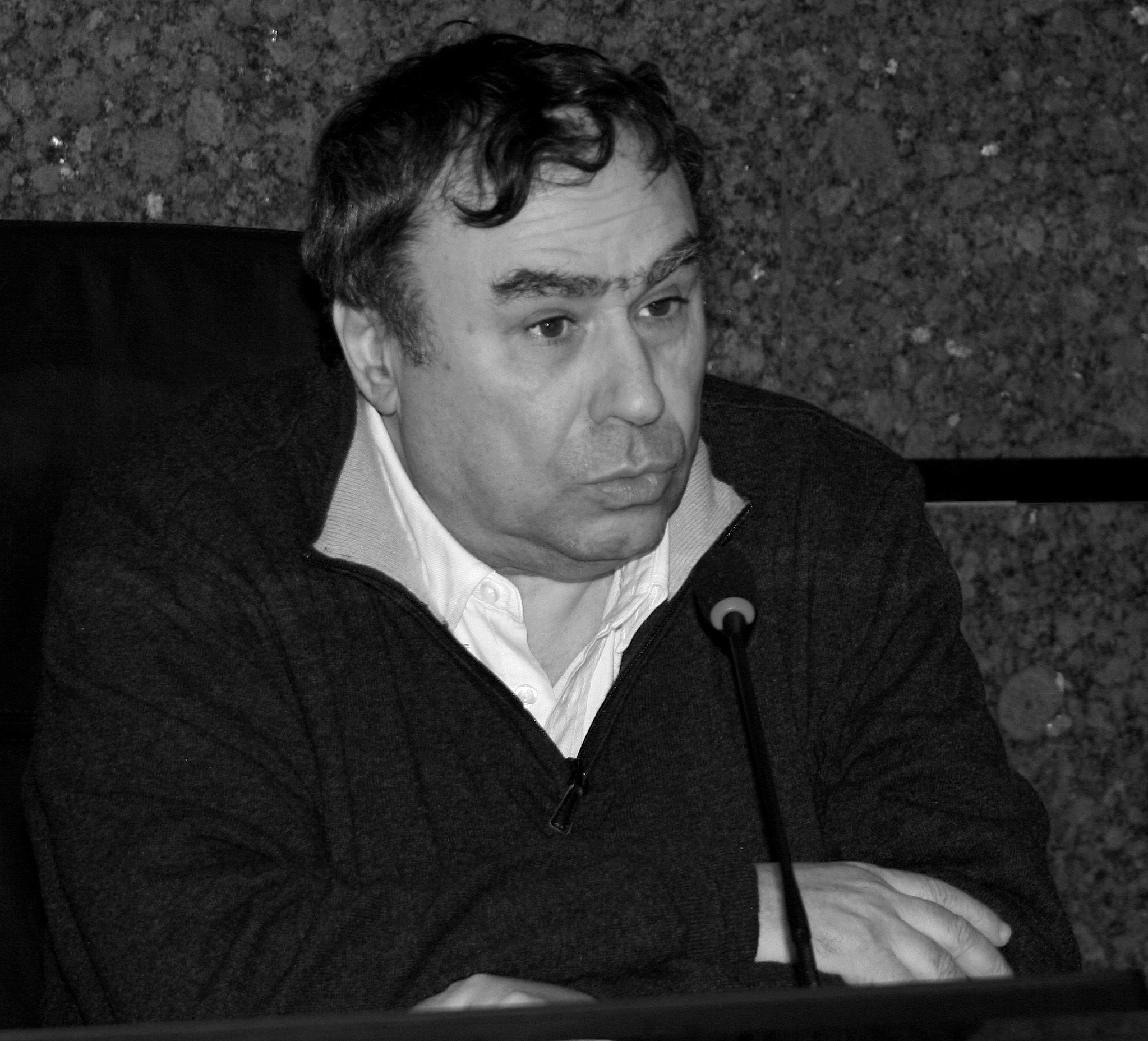
- Stora in 2012
- Born: 2 December 1950 (age 75); Constantine, French Algeria
- Education: Lycée Janson-de-Sailly
- Alma mater: Paris Nanterre University; Paris Diderot University
- Occupation: Historian

Benjamin Stora (born 2 December 1950) is a French historian, expert on North Africa, who is widely considered one of the world's leading authorities on Algerian history. He was born in a Jewish family that left the country following its War of Independence in 1962. Stora holds two PhDs (1974 and 1984) and a Doctorate of the State (1991).

== Career ==
Stora taught at the University of Paris 13. He founded and has been head of the Institut Maghreb-Europe since its inception in 1991, and also taught for a couple of years at the Institute of Oriental Languages and Civilisations (INALCO, Paris). As a member of the French School of the Far East he lived for two years in Hanoi, Vietnam, where he pursued his research on the imaginary of the Algerian and Vietnamese wars. In 1998 he was guest lecturer at the University of New York. He also spent three years in Rabat, Morocco, researching Algerian and Moroccan nationalism.

He has published almost thirty books, the most well known of which include a biography of Messali Hadj (reprinted by Hachette-Poche, 2004); a Biographical Dictionary of Algerian Militants (L'Harmattan, 1985); Gangrene and Oblivion: Memory of the Algerian War (La Découverte, 1991); They Came From Algeria: Algerian Immigration in France (1912–1992) (Fayard, 1992); The History of Colonial Algeria 1830–1954 (La Découverte, 1993); The History of Algeria Since Independence (La Découverte, 1994); Ferhat Abbas (Denoël, 1995, with Zakia Daoud); Algeria in 1995 (Michalon, 1995); Dictionary Of Books on The War in Algeria (L'Harmattan, 1996); Conscripts in The War in Algeria (Gallimard, 1997); The 100 Doors Of Maghreb (L'Atelier, 1999); The Last Generation of October (Stock, 2003); and The Three Exiles, Jews of Algeria (Stock, 2006) (selected for the Renaudot Essay Prize, 2006).

Stora was a historical advisor for the film Indochine, which won the Oscar for best foreign film (1993), commissioner for the exhibitions France at War in Algeria (Invalides Museum, Paris, France, 1992) and Images of the Algerian War (La Coupole Museum, Saint Omer, France, 2002). He is the author of the documentary The Algerian Years, broadcast by the France 2 television network in 1991. He collaborated with Jean-Michel Meurice to produce the documentary The summer of '62 in Algeria: The two faces of independence, broadcast by the France 5 network in 2002. In 2010 he was the historical advisor for The first man, a screen adaptation of Albert Camus's last, unfinished novel, and for The Free Men by the director Ismaël Ferroukhi.

His most recent works include a book, co-directed with Emile Temime, on the history of immigration in France, Immigrances. In 2008, he published a biographical essay, The never-ending wars: A historian, France and Algeria (published by Stock, 2008). The following year, his book, The De Gaulle Mystery: His project for Algeria, was met with great critical acclaim in France and Algeria.

He is a member of the jury for the History Prize of the French Senate and president of the scientific council of the Maghreb section of French foreign research institutes (CNRS).

== Political activism ==
In 1968, Benjamin Stora joined Pierre Lambert's Trotskyist activist group Alliance des Jeunes pour le Socialisme – Organisation Communiste Internationaliste (AJS-OCI, lit. "youth's alliance for socialism – internationalist communist organisation").

== Works in English (translated) ==
- Algeria, 1830–2000: A Short History (translated by Jane Marie Todd, with foreword by William B. Quandt). Ithaca, NY: Cornell University Press, 2004. ISBN 0-8014-8916-4 ISBN 9780801489167

== Works in French ==
- Messali Hadj. Pionnier du nationalisme algérien, Hachette, Paris 2004, ISBN 2-01-279190-5.
- Dictionnaire biographique de militants nationalistes algériens. 600 portraits.
- Nationalistes algériens et révolutionnaires français au temps du Front Populaire.
- Les sources du nationalisme algérien. Parcours idéologiques. Origine des acteurs.
- Histoire de l'Algérie coloniale (1830–1954), La Découverte, Paris, 2004, ISBN 2-7071-4466-5.
- La gangrène et l'oubli. La mémoire de la guerre d'Algérie., La Découverte.
- Ils venaient d'Algérie. L'immigration algérienne en France (1912–1992).
- Aide-mémoire de l'immigration algérienne. Chronologie (1922–1962). Bibliographie.
- Histoire de la guerre d'Algérie, La Découverte, Paris, 2004, ISBN 2-7071-4293-X.
- La Guerre d'Algérie – 1934–2004 La fin de l'amnésie (with Mohammed Harbi), Robert Laffont, Paris, 2004, ISBN 2-221-10024-7.
- Histoire de l'Algérie depuis l'indépendance – T1 : 1962–1988, éditions La Découverte Paris, ISBN 2-7071-4405-3.
- Ferhat Abbas. Biographie, avec Zakya Daoud
- L'Algérie en 1995.
- Dictionnaire des livres de la guerre d'Algérie (1955–1995). 2300 résumés, Presses Universitaires du Mirail, 2005, ISBN 2-85816-777-X.
- Imaginaires de guerre, Algérie-Viêt Nam en France et aux États-Unis, Paris, La Découverte, 1997, ISBN 2-7071-4308-1.
- Appelés en guerre d'Algérie, coll. "Découvertes Gallimard" (n° 316), Paris: Gallimard, 1997, ISBN 9782070534043
- Algérie, Formation d'une nation, suivi de Impressions dans l'est algérien.
- Le Transfert d'une Mémoire. De l'" Algérie française " au racisme anti-arabe.
- Les 100 Portes du Maghreb.
- La guerre invisible – Algérie années 90.
- Les trois exils, Juifs d'Algérie, Stock, Paris, 2006, ISBN 2-234-05863-5.
- Immigrances : L'immigration en France au XXe siècle (with E. Temine), Hachette, Paris, 2007, ISBN 2-01-237261-9.
- La guerre des mémoires – La France face à son passé colonial (interview with T. Leclère), éditions de l'aube, 2007.
- Les guerres sans fin, un historien entre la France et l'Algérie, Paris, Stock, 2008.
- Les immigrés algériens en France : une histoire politique, 1912-1962, Paris, Hachette Littératures, 2009.
- Le mystère De Gaulle : son choix pour l'Algérie, Paris, Robert Laffont, 2009.
- Le nationalisme algérien avant 1954, Paris, CNRS éditions, 2010.
- Histoire de l'Algérie : XIXe et XXe siècles, Paris, La Découverte, 2012.
- La guerre d'Algérie expliquée à tous, Paris, Seuil, 2012.
- De Gaulle et la guerre d'Algérie, Paris, Fayard, coll. « Pluriel », 2012
- Voyages en postcolonies, Paris, Stock, 2012
- La guerre d'Algérie expliquée en images, Paris, Seuil 2014.
- Les Clés retrouvées. Une enfance juive à Constantine, Paris, Stock, 2015.
- C'était hier en Algérie. Les Juifs d'Algérie, de l'Orient à la République, Paris, Larousse, 2016.
- Juifs, musulmans : la grande séparation, Paris, L'Esprit du temps, coll. « Quoi de neuf », 2017.
- 68, et après. Les Héritages égarés, Paris, Stock, 2018.
- Retours d'histoire. L'Algérie après Bouteflika, Paris, Bayard, 2019.
- Une mémoire algérienne, Paris, Robert Laffont, 2020.

== Honours ==
Date	Ribbon bar	Honour
2009		Knight of the Legion of Honour
2012		Officer of the Ordre des Arts et des Lettres
2015		Officer of the National Order of Merit
