= Algerian law on the criminalization of French colonization =

Parliament of Algeria
- Long title: Law No. 26-10 of 24 Dhu'l-Qa'da 1447 AH, corresponding to 12 May 2025 CE, on the criminalization of French colonization of Algeria Loi n° 26-10 du 24 Dhou El Kaâda 1447 correspondant au 12 mai 2026 relative à la criminalisation de la colonisation française de l’Algérie.
- Citation: Law No. 26-10
- Passed by: People's National Assembly
- Passed: 24 December 2025
- Passed by: Council of the Nation
- Passed: 22 January 2026
- Signed by: Abdelmadjid Tebboune
- Signed: 12 May 2026
- Status: Current legislation

The Algerian law on the criminalization of French colonization was unanimously approved by the members of the Algerian National People's Assembly on December 24, 2025.

Algeria's new law demands France to issue apologies and pay reparations for its colonization of the country from 1830 to 1962. It lists around thirty "imprescriptible state crimes" such as extrajudicial executions, French nuclear tests (1960–1966), forced displacements, the use of chemical weapons, torture, rape, and looting.

== Historical ==
=== Context ===
The French colonization of Algeria was characterized by widespread massacres, the destruction of socio-economic structures, and extensive deportations of populations. Numerous uprisings were suppressed prior to the Algerian War of Independence (1954–1962), which resulted in between 500,000 and 1.5 million deaths.

Initiatives to criminalize French colonialism in Algeria originated as early as 1984. The effort was revived in 2001 by historian and former member of parliament Mohamed Arezki Ferrad, and subsequently pursued through legislative proposals in 2006, 2010, and 2019.

The 2010 project, introduced on January 13, 2010 by National Liberation Front deputy Moussa Abdi and supported by 125 deputies from various majority parties in the Assembly, represented the most comprehensive version to date. It proposed the establishment of an Algerian criminal court to try "war criminals and those guilty of crimes against humanity." However, in September 2010, this bill, prepared for a vote, was ultimately withdrawn, as Assembly President Abdelaziz Ziari deemed its adoption potentially detrimental to Algeria–France relations.

In December 2024, Algerian President Abdelmadjid Tebboune clarified that he was not demanding financial compensation from France, but rather "recognition of its crimes," citing "illnesses resulting from its nuclear tests, from which our compatriots in the south still suffer today." The legislative process was resumed on February 13, 2025, coinciding with the anniversary of the first French nuclear test (Gerboise Bleue) in the Algerian Desert. Damages from these atomic explosions between 1960 and 1966 formed a key component of Algeria's reparation demands.

=== Parliament vote ===
On December 20, 2025, after nine months of parliamentary work, members of the People's National Assembly examined the bill from the beginning of the invasion in 1830 until July 5, 1962. The text was presented by Ibrahim Boughali, President of the National People's Assembly. The objective of this law was to obtain recognition and reparations from France.

On December 24, 2025, as a prelude to the vote, Algerian deputies, wearing sashes in the national colors, sang Kassaman (the national anthem), including the verse addressing colonial France. The law criminalizing French colonization was then adopted unanimously by the deputies of the People's National Assembly.

=== Vote by the Council of the Nation ===
In January 2026, the Council of the Nation (Senate) examine the draft law passed by the National People's Assembly (Algeria). Amendments are being considered, particularly the removal of the provisions for "apologies" and "compensation." The committee examining the draft law considers it to be inconsistent with the approach defined by the President of the Republic, which is based on the demand for explicit recognition of colonial crimes as an essential element of historical and legal responsibility, without linking this to demands for compensation or apologies.

Ultimately, on January 22, 2026, 13 articles were rejected from the initial draft, including Article 10, which established "comprehensive and equitable compensation for all material and moral damages caused by French colonialism" as a fundamental right. The Council of the Nation thus advocated for a simple recognition, unrelated to compensation.

== Content of the law ==
The bill comprises 27 articles and aims to legally classify "crimes committed by France" during the colonial period between 1830 and 1962 as imprescriptible state crimes, thereby "ending impunity." It addresses some thirty practices, including extrajudicial killings, forced displacement, the use of chemical weapons, torture, and looting. Similarly, rape or sexual slavery, the destruction of places of worship, and forced conversion to Christianity are mentioned.

The text specifically calls for the restitution of Algerian archives and property removed to France during the colonial period. It also demands the repatriation to Algeria of the remains of Algerian resistance fighters.

Regarding the 17 French nuclear tests in the Algerian Desert from 1960 to 1966, the health and environmental consequences of which persist, the transmission to Algiers of detailed maps of these tests and the cleaning of nuclear explosion sites contaminated by radioactivity, as well as other sites affected by pollutants of all kinds (chemical weapons), are requested.

The "collaboration of the Harkis" with the French authorities is described as "high treason".

Prison sentences of five to ten years are stipulated for any action by an Algerian celebrating French colonialism. Furthermore, two to five years in prison are possible for attacks on symbols of the Algerian resistance, the national movement, and the war of liberation. Finally, one to three years imprisonment is prescribed for "remarks with colonial connotations."

== Analysis ==
According to the Algerian media outlet "TSA", (Note: acronym for "Tout sur l'Algérie" (Everything about Algeria)) this is a reaction to the rise in France of a discourse held primarily by "the far right and certain political figures, who have recently been multiplying their positions that glorify colonialism.".

According to Le Monde, this initiative is part of a context marked by the rise in France of discourses, particularly those of the far-right and certain political figures, perceived as either rehabilitating or minimizing the colonial past. The project asserts a form of "memory sovereignty," shifting the debate from the realm of commemoration to that of international criminal law, questioning the responsibility of the French colonial state without targeting the French people. It would also align with decolonial dynamics observed internationally and, within Algeria, contribute to strengthening national unity around the legacy of November 1, 1954. Le Monde notes that, while some in Algeria believe that Algeria has definitively won its anti-colonial struggle, the rise in France of discourses denying or relativizing colonization, in a context of heightened bilateral tensions, is making a segment of the population more receptive to this type of approach.
