= Cement shoes =

Method of murder or body disposal

Cement shoes, concrete shoes, or Chicago overcoat is a method of murder or body disposal, usually associated with criminals such as the Mafia or gangs. It involves placing the victim's feet into wet cement or concrete, allowing it time to set, and then throwing them into water in the hope the body will never be found. In the US, the term has become a tongue-in-cheek euphemism for a threat of death by criminals. It is a common trope in fiction.

== Cement shoes ==
Cement shoes involve first binding, incapacitating or killing the victim and then placing each foot into a bucket or box, which is then filled with wet concrete (a mixture of cement powder, rock, water and sand), or even simply cement powder and water. Typically in films and novels, the victim is still alive as they watch the concrete harden, heightening the torture and drama. After the concrete sets, the victim is thrown into a body of water such as a river, lake or the ocean.

== Real-life incidents ==
Despite being a theme in Hollywood movies like Lady in Cement and books like E. L. Doctorow's Billy Bathgate, whether such a cumbersome and time-consuming method of execution was practical remained in question. Cement takes many hours or even days to fully harden and, until 2016, there was never a documented case—although crime historian Thomas Reppetto said there have probably been real-life examples that have never been found.

In May 2016, the first and only documented case of "cement shoes" was reported. The body of Brooklyn gang member Peter Martinez, aged 28, better known on the streets as Petey Crack, washed up near Manhattan Beach in Brooklyn. His head was wrapped in duct tape, the immediate cause of his death. His feet and shins were encased in concrete set inside a five-US-gallon (19-litre) bucket. His body floated to the shore due to air in the concrete because it was not given enough time to dry before being thrown into the ocean.

The French Army reportedly used cement shoes on Algerians on so-called "death flights" during the Algerian War. The victims were called "crevettes Bigeard" 'Bigeard shrimp' after General Marcel Bigeard, who ordered the procedure. Bigeard put his victims' feet in a basin, poured quick-setting cement in and threw the person into the sea from the top of a helicopter, said Paul Teitgen, secretary general of the French police in Algiers in 1957, and notable opponent of torture during the war.

== Concrete tied weights ==
In related incidents, concrete blocks tied to the victim have been used to expediently dispose of a body; this method has well documented cases. In 1941, the body of Philadelphia racketeer Johnnie Goodman was found by a crab fisherman in a New Jersey creek, weighed down with an 18-kilogram (40-pound) block of concrete. On August 24, 1964, the body of Ernest Rupolo, aged 52, a trigger man who informed on Vito Genovese in 1944, was found in Jamaica Bay, New York, with concrete blocks tied to his legs.

== Parodies ==
A Far Side cartoon parodied the practice, depicting a fish given "Styrofoam shoes" in order to "sleep with the humans". It is a reference to "sleep with the fishes", a phrase that first appears in Homer's Iliad (21), in which Achilles threatens (and kills) Lycaon, who will 'sleep with the fishes'.

== See also ==
- Crushing (method of execution)
- Lupara bianca
- Stoning
