= Harkettes =

Algerian women auxiliaries

Harkettes is the generic name given to native Algerian women who served as auxiliaries to the French Army during the Algerian War. The French named them after their male counterparts, the Harkis.

Indigenous Algerian auxiliaries who fought for the French army, male or female, were called harkas. The use of the diminutive -ette with the term harkette has been suggested by one historian as "clearly condescending".

== History ==
In January 1959, French Lieutenant Onrupt, the head of the Specialized Administrative Sections (SAS) of the town of Catinat (now Settara), formed a women's harka. 18 of the 34 women volunteers were armed and trained for several months. Most of them were widows or wives of Harkis. The Harkettes also learnt to pour concrete, tile roofs and set up power lines. At the end of their training, they were tasked with protecting crops and convoys on specific roads, most particularly that going to El Milia.

The harka was disbanded in 1961.

There may have been other women's harkas. However, their number is hard to estimate, due to the lack of official reports.

== Legacy ==
On March 3, 1960, French President Charles de Gaulle and lieutenant colonel Roger Trinquier visited the SAS unit in Catinat as part of a military inspection tour known as la tournée des popotes (literally, the tour of mobile canteens).

At the end of the war in 1962 some Harkas escaped to France, but in Algeria there were widespread massacres of those men, women and children who remained.

== See also ==
- Algerian War
- Harki
- Moghazni
- Women in the Algerian War
