= Killing of Saadia Mebarek =

Algerian woman

Saadia Mebarek (Arabic: سعدية مبارك; died 25 May 1960) was an Algerian woman arrested, tortured and killed by French soldiers during the Algerian War.

== Biography ==
She married Mohamed Kader, a crane operator, and was pregnant when she was arrested in Algiers by a Zouave unit at about 23:00 on 24 May 1960. Mebarek and five other Algerian women were taken to headquarters of the 9th Zouave Company, located in the Fontaine-Fraîche quarter of Oued Koriche and according to witnesses, they overheard screaming from the building for the next hour. Mebarek's five companions were released but she was not.

Her husband filed a complaint two days later Saadia was found dead in the early morning of 25 May. She was brought on a stretcher, by a French soldier, to the Mustapha Pacha hospital. Mebarek's body showed signs of torture with blunt force trauma and electrocution burns. Zouave Lieutenant Maindt stated that Mebarek and the other women were arrested as part of an operation against propagandists who were opposed to the cantonal elections on 29 May, but claimed Mebarek was released unharmed with the other detainees and coincidentally found injured by soldiers.

== Investigation, research and trial ==
=== Official report ===
On 3 June 1960, President Charles de Gaulle asked Prime Minister Michel Debré to initiate an investigation: "The facts denounced are of particular gravity. [...] It goes without saying that if torture is established, exemplary sanctions will have to be taken”. According to the army report transmitted on 11 June by Minister Pierre Messmer, Saadia Mebarek was suspected, along with four other women, of "abstentionist propaganda for the cantonal elections", in a context where the National Liberation Front called for the 'abstention. The trial of an active lieutenant and two reserve second lieutenants suspected of having tortured Saadia Mebarek to death.

=== Trial ===
The trial was held behind closed doors in January 1962 at the Permanent Armed Forces Tribunal. According to historians Sylvie Thénault and Raphaëlle Branche, it was the only trial involving soldiers involved in operations in Algeria.

The accused admitted the facts with which they were charged. However, the soldiers present in court acquitted the three defendants. Thus, “the army would not take responsibility for the abuses committed during the war, for which it ultimately holds the political power responsible”.
