= Chemical weapons in the Algerian War =

A French soldier of a chemical weapons unit wearing a gas mask inside a cave during the Algerian War.

During the Algerian War (1954-1962), the French army deployed toxic gases on a large and systematic scale against Algerian FLN/ALN fighters and civilians sheltering in caves and underground networks. This was in violation of the 1925 Geneva Protocol, to which France had been a signatory since that year. The practice was organized under specialized military units designated as "special weapons sections" (sections armes spéciales), which operated across Algeria, primarily in the mountainous regions of Kabylie and the Aurès. France's use of chemical weapons in Algeria was classified as a state secret for decades; military archives relating to the practice remain partially inaccessible as of 2025.

The subject received renewed public attention following the March 2025 release of the documentary "Algeria, special weapons sections" (Algérie, sections armes spéciales), directed by Claire Billet and based on nearly a decade of research by historian Christophe Lafaye. The extent of these operations, estimated at between 5,000 and 10,000, and the death toll, which included significant civilian casualties, remain difficult to establish fully due to ongoing archive restrictions.

In 2018, French Senator Pierre Laurent, of the French Communist Party, formally questioned the government on whether France intended to recognize and condemn its use of chemical weapons in several colonial conflicts, including Algeria; the government's response defended existing archive restrictions under Article L213-2 of the Code du patrimoine, which prohibits the communication of documents that could facilitate the manufacture or use of weapons of mass destruction.

== Background ==
The Algerian War was marked by widespread atrocities committed by the French army, including mass displacement of Algerian populations, torture, extrajudicial executions, and the use of prohibited weapons. A critical tactical challenge for French forces was the ALN's use of Algeria's extensive cave systems and underground networks, particularly in Kabylie (including the Djurdjura massif) and the Aurès mountains, as shelters, command posts, and caches. These natural redoubts, long used by the local population for refuge, proved difficult to dislodge through conventional assault. It was in response to this tactical problem that chemical weapons were developed as a systematic solution. The French army had already used prohibited or controversial weapons in previous conflicts. During the Rif War in Morocco (1921-1926), France assisted in the installation of a chemical gas, chloropicrin, filling workshop at Melilla, in support of the Spanish army.

During the Indochina War, French forces used napalm on multiple occasions, including at the Battle of Pho Lu (February 1950), the Battle of Vinh Yen (January 1951), the Battle of the Black River (December 1951-January 1952), and at Dien Bien Phu from November 1953 onward. In Algeria itself, napalm was deployed in operations including Aloès (December 1954), Véronique (January 1955), and Ariane, with use increasing significantly during the execution of the Challe Plan (February 1959-April 1961). Testing of sarin gas was also conducted at the B2-Namous base in Algeria, continuing after independence. None of these uses has been officially recognized or condemned by France.

== Organization and authorization ==
The decision to deploy chemical weapons in Algeria originated at the highest levels of the French state. Defense minister Maurice Bourgès-Maunoury signed the political authorization for chemical weapons use, and General Charles Ailleret, head of the Special Weapons Command (Commandement des armes spéciales, CAS), was the central architect of the doctrine. Ailleret promoted chemical weapons deployment as a systematic military doctrine rather than an improvised response.

The first dedicated unit, the BAS of the 411th RAA, was established on 1 December 1956. Recruits, including conscripts (appelés du contingent), underwent training at the 610th Special Weapons Testing and Instruction Group (GEIAS) in Bourges before deployment to Algeria. Between 1956 and 1959, up to 119 such units were created across Algeria. From 1959 onward, following reorganization under the Challe Plan, approximately twenty sections continued operations on a regular basis through 1962.

In total, Lafaye estimates more than 2,000 French military personnel participated in the cave war. Units were instructed to search a cave, gas it, and if possible seal the entrance. French military archives contain an operational log from 1961 alone recording 903 caves treated by specialized sections, resulting in 317 fighters or civilians killed or captured, illustrating how the confirmed figure of 440 documented operations underestimates the actual scale of the campaign.

== Types of chemical weapons used ==
The primary agent confirmed by documentary evidence is CN2D, a compound mixture of three components: CN gas (chloroacetophenone), a cyanide derivative; DM gas (diphenylaminechlorarsine, also known as adamsite), an arsenical compound; and kieselguhr, a fine siliceous powder of micron-scale particles that carried the toxic gas particles deep into the respiratory system. The combination of these three elements in high concentrations produced a gas that could rapidly prove lethal in enclosed spaces, causing asphyxiation or pulmonary edema.

According to witness testimony, death in a confined cave could occur within fifteen minutes of exposure. The agents used belonged to First World War-era arsenals and were not particularly innovative in chemical terms. CN2D was delivered in grenades, flares, and rockets. Internally, the French military referred to these agents as "reinforced tear gases" (gaz lacrymogènes renforcés), a framing intended to suggest they fell within categories technically permitted under the Geneva Conventions, despite their chemical composition and documented lethal effects identifying them as prohibited arsenical agents. Lafaye notes that the use of other toxic gases is possible based on partial archival evidence, but cannot be confirmed in the current state of research.

Napalm was also deployed by French forces in Algeria, used in surface operations against forests, villages, and ALN positions throughout the conflict. According to the French military's own classification, napalm fell under the category of "special weapons" alongside chemical and nuclear agents. Its use in Algeria is documented from 1956 onward.

Algerian researcher in nuclear engineering Amar Mansouri notes that other weapons used by the French army include sarin, butane, and phosphorus.

== Algerian casualties ==
Based on accessible French archives, historian Christophe Lafaye documented approximately 440 to 450 confirmed chemical weapons operations, primarily concentrated in Kabylie and the Aurès mountains. However, his estimate of the actual total, informed by partial archival access, is between 5,000 and 10,000 operations across Algerian territory, a figure that encompasses both offensive operations targeting fighters sheltering in caves and preventive ones aimed at rendering cave systems permanently unusable. Operations were geographically widespread and not confined to the two main mountain regions. A well-documented mass killing occurred at Ghar Ouchettouh in Batna on 22–23 March 1959, where 118 inhabitants, the majority women and children, were killed by gas intoxication.

The full death toll cannot be established without access to classified French military archives. Many Algerian families have been unable to recover or identify the remains of relatives killed in cave operations, as bodies were frequently left inside sealed caves with entrances dynamited after gassing, and eyewitness testimony from survivors describes victims removed from caves with bodies turned blue and bloated.

== Health consequences for French soldiers ==
French military personnel in the special weapons sections were themselves exposed to toxic agents. Veteran Yves Cargnino, who served in such a unit, reported decades of severe respiratory illness as a consequence of his exposure to CN2D in Algeria. In 2018, the Besançon pensions tribunal formally recognized that his pulmonary injuries were attributable to CN2D exposure in Algeria, establishing a legal precedent for French veterans seeking recognition of their injuries. The documentary Algérie, sections armes spéciales further documents that many soldiers from the special weapons sections developed pulmonary diseases, stomach and skin cancers, and leukemia in subsequent decades.

Many French conscripts who participated in these operations had no knowledge of the precise chemical identity of the agents they were deploying, but witnessed their lethal effects firsthand.

== French response ==
France has not officially acknowledged or condemned its use of chemical weapons in Algeria. Under Article L213-2 of the Code du patrimoine (as modified in 2008), archives whose communication could facilitate the design, manufacture, use, or localization of weapons of mass destruction, including chemical weapons, are exempted from general accessibility rules.

In 2021, the Ministry of Armed Forces used counter-terrorism legislation to create a new category of archives with no mandatory disclosure deadline, explicitly including documents relating to the cave war, a justification Lafaye has publicly described as "completely absurd" given the archaic nature of the agents involved. The fifty-year automatic declassification rule under French heritage law, reaffirmed by the Conseil d'État in 2021, has thus been effectively circumvented for this specific corpus of documents. In 2022, historians and journalists including Lafaye and Gilles Manceron formally called on President Emmanuel Macron to issue a presidential decree opening the entirety of the relevant military archives and lifting legislative obstacles to their consultation.

In 2018, Senator Pierre Laurent formally questioned the government on whether France intended to recognize and condemn its use of chemical weapons in Algeria and other colonial conflicts. The government's response defended existing archive restrictions and did not address the substance of the allegations. The documentary Algérie, sections armes spéciales was initially scheduled for broadcast on France 5 but was removed from the channel's schedule shortly before its planned airdate, airing instead only on France Télévisions' digital platform, a decision widely noted by historians and journalists involved in the project. It was subsequently rescheduled and broadcast on France 5 on 8 June 2025.

== Algerian response ==
Algeria has consistently demanded greater French transparency about wartime atrocities, including the use of chemical weapons. However, Algeria has not conducted an independent formal investigation into the chemical weapons attacks, largely because the relevant French archives remain inaccessible.

== International law assessment ==
France ratified the 1925 Geneva Protocol prohibiting the use of chemical and biological weapons in warfare on 10 May 1926. The use of CN2D agents against combatants and civilians in Algeria was therefore illegal under international law to which France was bound.

France became a signatory to the Chemical Weapons Convention (CWC) in 1993, which entered into force in 1997, but has made no declaration regarding its historical use of chemical agents in colonial conflicts, including in Algeria, in connection with its CWC obligations.

== See also ==
- Algerian War
- France and weapons of mass destruction
- Torture during the Algerian War
- Sexual violence in the Algerian War
- Regroupement camps in the Algerian War
