= Jacques Duquesne (journalist) =

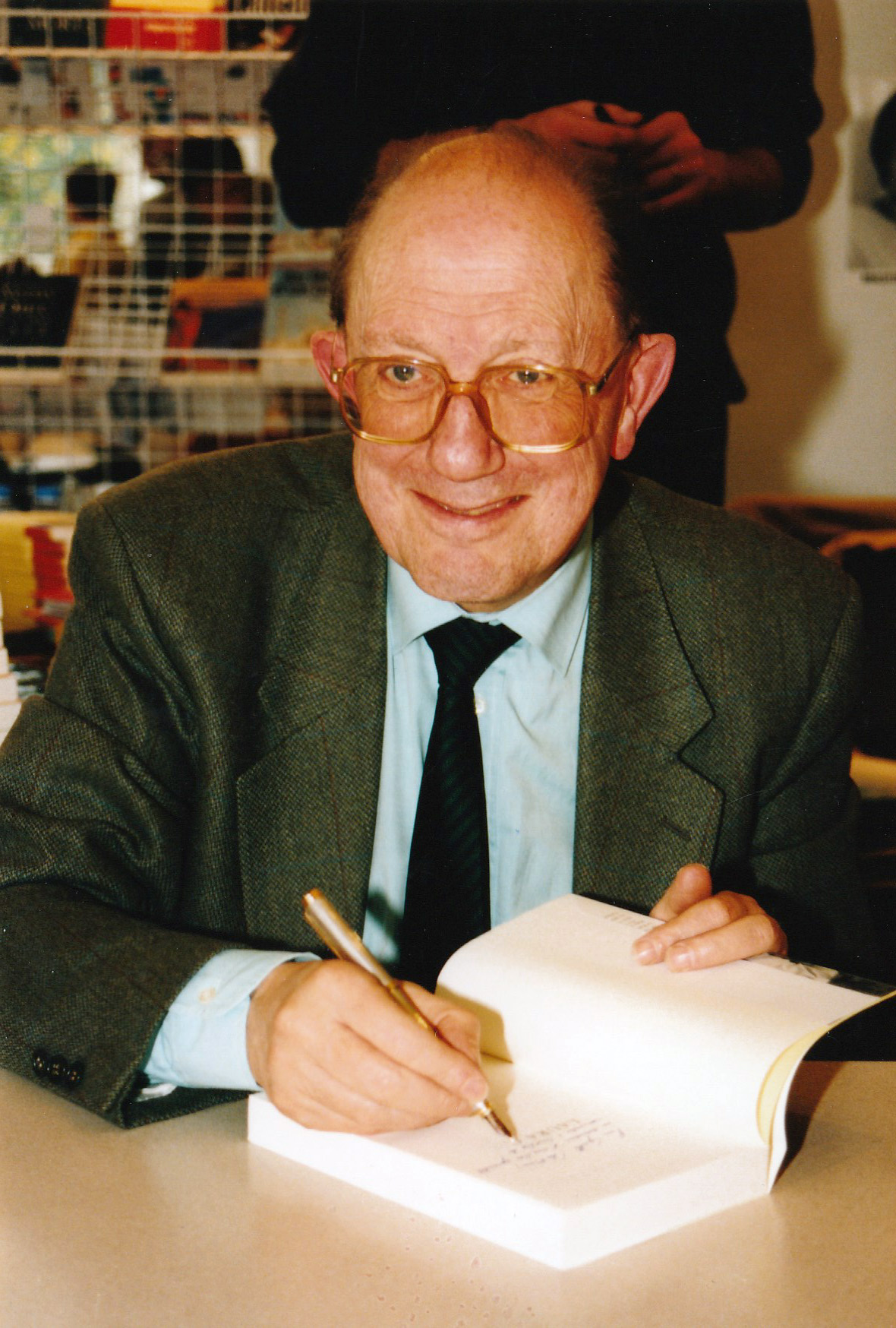
- Born: Jacques Henri Louis Duquesne; 18 March 1930; Dunkirk
- Died: 5 July 2023 (aged 93); 13th arrondissement of Paris
- Resting place: Montparnasse Cemetery
- Occupation: Writer, journalist, opinion writer
- Awards: (1991)

Jacques Duquesne (March 18, 1930 – July 5, 2023) was a French journalist and writer.

== Biography ==
Born in Dunkirk in 1930, Jacques Duquesne was marked by the battle fought around the town and port during the evacuation of the British Expeditionary Force (World War II) in May–June 1940, a battle he has written about many times in his books.

He studied at the Paris Institute of Political Studies and became involved with the Jeunesse Étudiante Chrétienne (JEC). General Secretary of the Association Catholique de la Jeunesse Française in 1954, he was elected President of the Conseil de la Jeunesse de l'Union Française in October 1955, which led him to travel extensively in the former African colonies.

First working for La Croix as a reporter (1957–1964), he landed in Algeria for his first reports just after the famous Battle of Algiers (1956–1957). He published articles denouncing torture during the Algerian War. He then contributed to Panorama chrétien (1964–1970) and L'Express (1967–1971). In 1972, he helped found Le Point magazine, before becoming its editor-in-chief (1974–1977). He then became managing director of the La Vie publications group (1977–1979).

In 1987, he acted as a journalistic guarantor for the Bouygues group when privatized TF1.

He returned to Le Point, where he became chairman and CEO (1985–1990). Finally, in 1997, he became Chairman of the Supervisory Board of L'Express. He chairs the Association pour le soutien des principes de la démocratie humaniste, which oversees the entire Groupe Sipa – Ouest-France group.

He has written several novels and numerous essays, some on religious themes.

From 1991 to 2016, he was president of Bateau Feu, Dunkirk's national stage.

In 2004, in an essay, he opposed a possible dogmatic definition of Mary Coredemptrix, following the position of the Second Vatican Council.

He died on July 5, 2023 at the age of 93 in his Paris apartment. He was buried on July 13 in the Montparnasse cemetery (division 3) in Paris, after a funeral service at the Saint-Séverin church.

== Publications ==
- 1958 : L'Algérie ou la guerre des mythes
- 1961 : Sujet ou citoyen
- 1963 : Les 16–24 ans
- 1965 : Les Prêtres
- 1966 : Les Catholiques français sous l'Occupation
- 1968 : Demain une Église sans prêtres ?
- 1970 : Dieu pour l'homme d'aujourd'hui
- 1972 : La Gauche du Christ
- 1973 : Les 13–16 ans, Montyon Prize in 1974 by Académie Française
- 1976 : Le Cas Jean-Pierre: l'affaire de Bruay, preface of Me Georges Pinet, supply (economics)
- 1977 : Le Dieu de Jésus
- 1977 : La Grande Triche
- 1979 : Une voix, la nuit
- 1981 : La Rumeur de la ville
- 1983 : Maria Vandamme, Prix Interallié
- 1985 : Saint Éloi
- 1985 : Alice van Meulen
- 1986 : Les Catholiques français sous l'occupation
- 1988 : Au début d'un bel été
- 1989 : Les vents du nord m'ont dit
- 1990 : Catherine Courage
- 1992 : Jean Bart
- 1994 : Laura C.
- 1994 : Jésus
- 1996 : Théo et Marie
- 1997 : Le Dieu de Jésus
- 1998 : L'Exposition universelle de 1900 (preface)
- 1998 : Le Bonheur en 36 vertus
- 1999 : Dieu expliqué à mes petits enfants
- 2000 : Les Années Jean Paul II
- 2000 : Aline (Les héritières tome 1)
- 2000 : Aurélie (Les héritières tome 2)
- 2001 : Céline (Les héritières tome 3)
- 2001 : Pour comprendre la guerre d'Algérie
- 2002 : Et pourtant nous étions heureux
- 2004 : Marie, mère de Jésus
- 2004 : L'Histoire de l'Église : à travers 100 chefs-d'œuvre de la peinture (preface)
- 2005 : Dieu, malgré tout
- 2007 : Judas, le deuxième jour
- 2007 : Yvonne-Aimée n'a pas son âge
- 2009 : Le Diable, Plon
- 2012 : Le Mal d'Algérie, Plon
- 2012 : Carnets secrets de la guerre d'Algérie, Bayard
- 2014 : Saint François
- 2016 : Histoires vraies : une vie de journaliste, Albin Michel
- 2017 : Dunkerque 1940, une tragédie française, Flammarion

== Filmography ==
- 1989 : Maria Vandamme, (7 d'Or of best author)
- 1993 : Catherine Courage
- 1999 : Jésus
- 2002 : La Rafle du Vel d'Hiv (documentary co-written by Gilles Nadeau)

== Sources ==
- Cyran, Olivier; Ba, Mehdi (2005). Almanach critique des médias. Édition des Arènes. p. 240.
- Henning, Christophe (2023b). "Mort de Jacques Duquesnes, humaniste et engagé". La Croix.
- De Larminat, Astrid (2023-07-07). "Jacques Duquesne, journaliste et écrivain" (PDF). Le Figaro: 15.
- Henning, Christophe (2023a). "Mort de l'humaniste Jacques Duquesne". La Croix (in French): 19.
- Pèrelin. "Polémique autour du « Marie » de Duquesne". Le Pèlerin.
- Landru, Philippe (2013-10-07). "Montparnasse (75) : tombeaux remarquables de la 3ème division". Cimetières de France et d'ailleurs.
