= Sexual violence in the Algerian War =

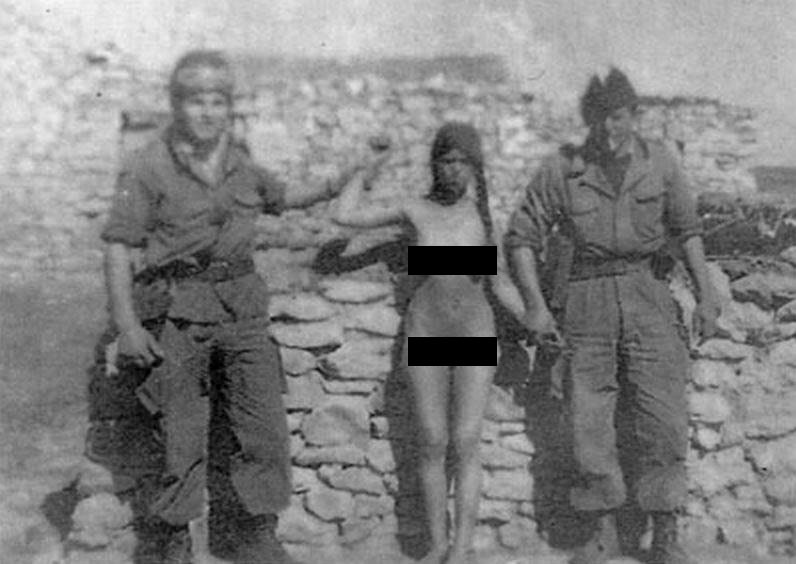
An Algerian woman sexually abused by the French army. French soldiers often took pictures of their victims to humiliate them further.

Sexual violence in the Algerian War was committed by the French Army against both FLN/ALN members and Algerian civilians. Victims included men, women, and even children. In contrast to torture, which has been extensively documented and studied by historians, sexual violence has remained for a long time a taboo subject, for both Algerian and French sides. It was not until the early 2000s that the subject was approached by historians and journalists. This effort has been limited by the scarcity of archives related to sexual violence, as well as the lack of testimonials of either the victims or the authors of crimes.

== Background ==
After the start of the Algerian War in 1954, women played an increasingly important role in the operations carried out against the French army in Algeria. Consequently, the French authorities ordered soldiers to start paying closer attention to the actions of Algerian women, who became subject to arrest and interrogation under the suspicion of aiding the FLN revolutionaries. By 1959, the violence against Algerian women became more generalized, including imprisonment, torture, and summary executions. The violence against arrested women could be sexualized, including verifying their genital parts to confirm their identity as females, and specifically targeting genital parts during torture. Sexual violence included rape, which was at that time officially banned by the French army. However, French soldiers who committed rape rarely faced sanctions from the authorities.

== Types of sexual violence ==
Two major types of rape happened during the war. Both types have in common that they were carried out by groups, where the victim was raped by multiple soldiers, as well as under the threat of arms.

=== Rape during interrogations ===
Sexual assault against arrested men and women was used in a frequent, if not systematic manner by the French army. Some reports indicate that rape was even used as a "conditioning" of suspect women before starting their interrogations. Rape could also be used to make women suffer even more in addition to physical torture. This type of rape was common in arrest and torture centers, as well as in prisons, primarily in large towns, such as the capital Algiers.

=== Rape during military searches ===
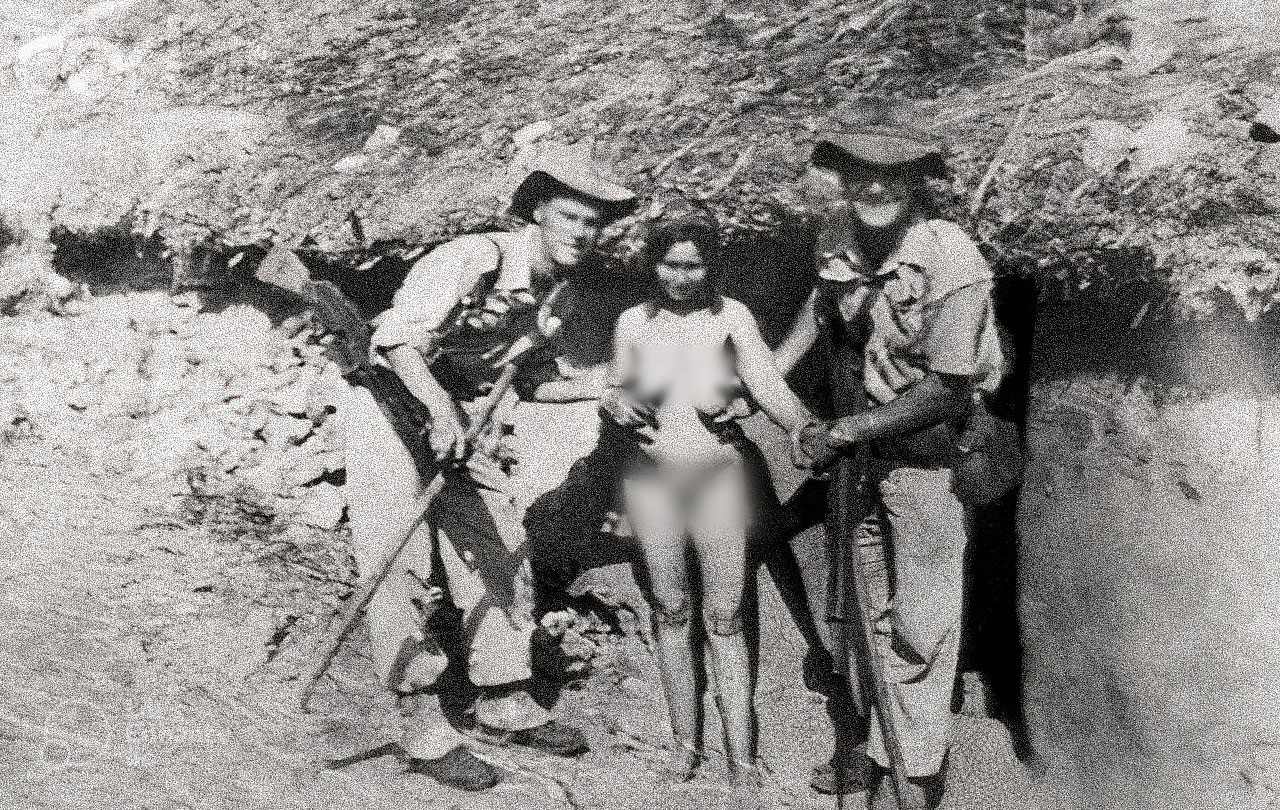
Algerian woman sexually abused by the French army.

This type of rape occurred during the searches of Algerian villages, or mechtas, specifically in remote and rural areas, such as Kabylia, and it could be either planned or opportunistic, with the latter being more common. Planned rape was carried out by a group of soldiers who searched the villages with the intent of committing sexual crimes. The operations were done in secret and at night time because the soldiers were unlawfully abandoning their posts without permission. During these operations, men were taken outside of the houses, under the threat of arms, while the French soldiers raped the women. Furthermore, the French soldiers used physical violence against women and their family members. Despite the secrecy of these operations, several reports indicate that the chief of groups and the military authority were aware of these operations, and they could even allow their soldiers to carry out these acts. This could be illustrated in a case that happened in 1956, during one of these operations, the men of the village who were taken outside tried to revolt when they heard the women screaming inside the houses. To force them to calm down, one French soldier opened fire into the air, but mistakenly shot and injured another French soldier. The case then became known to both military and judicial authorities, who were aware that rape was occurring during that operation. However, no sanctions were taken against any of the soldiers.

Opportunistic rape happened during official inspection of villages, and in contrast to the first type, these searches were not secret but were planned and authorized by the chiefs. During these searches, women were inspected, including their genital parts, in a humiliating manner. French soldiers would specifically take advantage of the absence of men, who were often gone fighting, to rape women.

== Rape as a Weapon of War ==
In contrast to torture, there was no official document recommending the use of rape during the Algerian War. The use of rape by the French army was primarily to break the Algerian people and make them suffer, specifically those considered conquered by the FLN. As such, rape was not simply sexual violence, but also a weapon of war. The raped women were considered enemies or women of the enemy by French soldiers. By committing rape, French soldiers knew that they would be shaking the social order of the Algerian society at that time, which valued women's honor and virginity, which must be protected by men. The motivation of rapes was less sexual, and rather to humiliate and conquer the Algerian population.

== Extent of use ==
Historians agree that not all French soldiers committed sexual violence during the Algerian War and that the extent of rape is not comparable to the mass rape in other conflicts, such as in the Bosnian War. However, there were specific instances where the use of rape was massive, such as during the summer of 1959 in Kabylia. During this time, rape was part of an extensive use of violence against the local population, as a response to a preceding military operation carried out by the FLN where the French casualties were high.

== Response of the French authorities ==
At the time of the Algerian War, rape was officially banned and punishable in the French army. However, the vast majority of rapists among the French soldiers never faced sanctions, which could be attributed to two major reasons. First, the silence of victims who rarely reported these crimes to the authorities. Second, even on the rare occasions where crimes were reported, the cases were dismissed. There were very rare cases of disciplinary actions against French soldiers convicted of rape. By acting as such, both the military and judicial authorities promoted impunity of rape crimes and indirectly encouraged the frequency of these acts.

== Evidence ==
The archives of the French Ministry of Justice contain some reports related to rape cases that were reported to the authorities. However, most of the cases were investigated by the military authority at that time, whose archives remain mostly inaccessible. In addition to these archives, historians have also relied on journals, letters, and testimonials by the French soldiers stationed in Algeria during the war.

== Cases ==
- Mohamed Garne: was born to an Algerian mother, Kheira Garne, in 1960. Kheira Garne was repeatedly raped by French soldiers in a concentration camp, and she was only 14 at that time. When she became pregnant, the soldiers tried to force her to miscarry by physically abusing her. However, she gave birth to Mohamed Garne, who was separated from his mother, and taken by Catholic nuns. He was eventually adopted by a French family. In 2001, he was recognized by the Court of Appeal of Paris as a victim of the French state. By that, he became the first victim to be recognized by the French state due to actions carried out by the French army during the Algerian War, which were normally amnestied under the Evian Accords.
- Louisette Ighilahriz: An Algerian FLN member who was arrested in 1957 and raped by French military officials for months, when she was 21. She is one of the very few female FLN fighters who spoke out about being raped during the war.

== See also ==
- Torture during the Algerian War
- Regroupement camps in the Algerian War
- Chemical weapons in the Algerian War
- Djamila Boupacha (an FLN militant who was tortured and raped by the French army)
- Wartime sexual violence
- Women in the Algerian War
- Mohamed Garne
