= Women in the Algerian War =

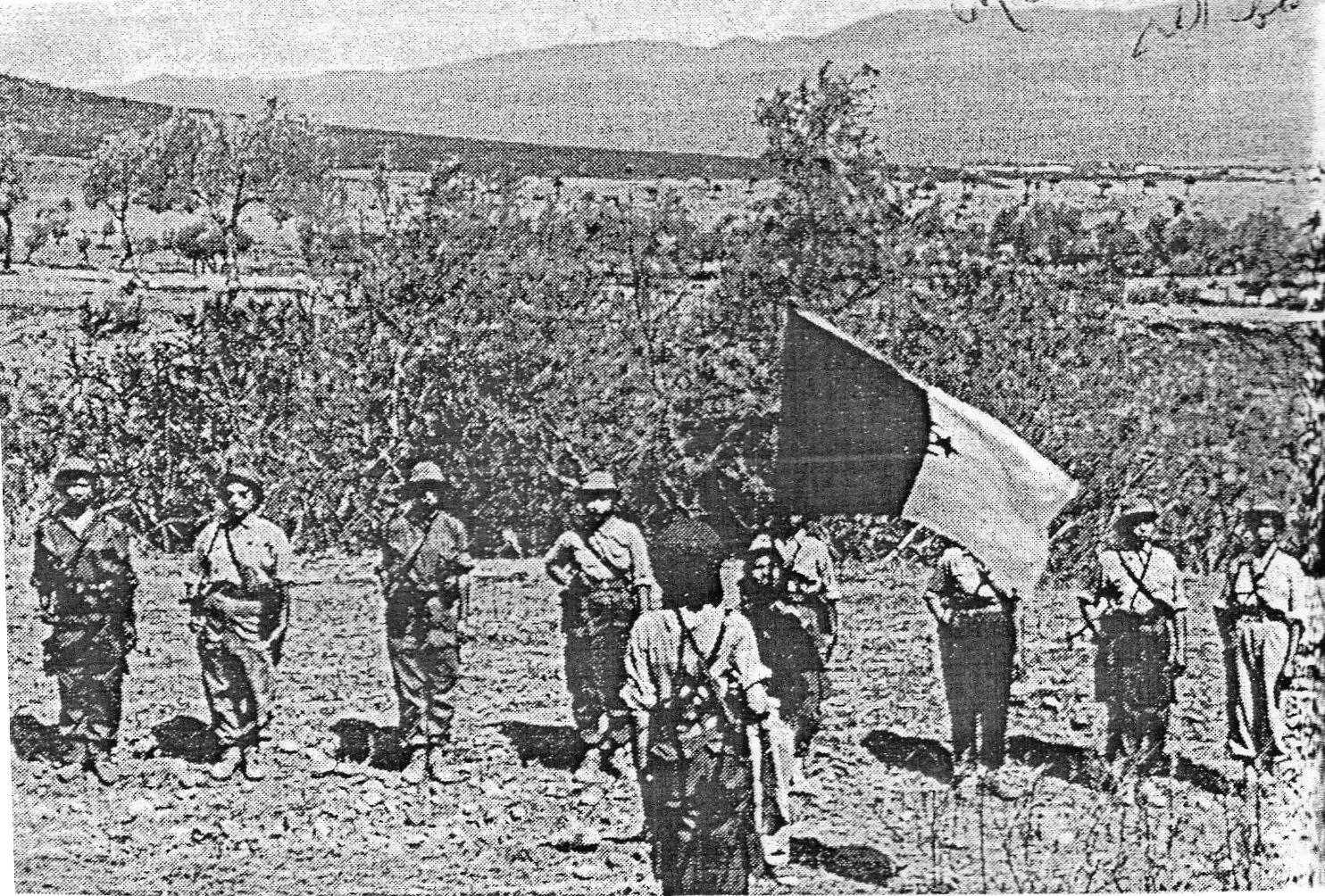
Women in the Algerian War of Independence with the Algerian flag

Women fulfilled a number of different functions during the Algerian War (1954–1962). The majority of Muslim women who became active participants did so on the side of the National Liberation Front (FLN). The French included some women, both Muslim and French, in their war effort, but they were not as fully integrated, nor were they charged with the same breadth of tasks as their Algerian sisters. The total number of women involved in the conflict, as determined by post-war veteran registration, is numbered at 11,000, but it is possible that this number was significantly higher due to underreporting.

There exists a distinction between two different types of women who became involved: urban and rural. Urban women, who constituted about twenty percent of the overall force, had received some kind of education and usually chose to enter on the side of the FLN of their own accord. Largely illiterate rural women, on the other hand (the remaining eighty percent), became involved due to geographical proximity to FLN operations paired with force, although some of them did join out of compassion.

The rural women combatants in the Algerian War were referred to as the mujahidat and "left their homes and families to join the FLN armed guerrilla bands, the Armée Libération Nationale (ALN)". They tended to be young, unmarried, and prepared to join the resistance "with or without the approval of their families". The mujahidat also were "social assistants to the rural population in the zones in which they were posted and would give local female peasants advice on topics such as hygiene and education". They also had important political responsibilities as many of these female combatants promoted the FLN by "organizing political meetings with local women".

The urban women combatants were referred to as the fidayat and largely "engaged in paramilitary activities in the urban centres".

== Roles ==
Around 11,000 women from across Algeria are said to have fought or helped in the war effort; however, many scholars believe the actual number of women who contributed to the liberation movement is much higher. Women operated in various areas during the course of the rebellion. Meredith Turshen claims, “Women participated actively as combatants, spies, fundraisers, as well as nurses, launderers, and cooks.” Gerard De Groot adds, “women assisted the male fighting forces in areas like transportation, communication and administration.” The range of involvement by a woman could include both combatant and non-combatant roles. A majority of women in the liberation movement did not participate in direct combat. They did equally important tasks such as providing weapons, food, housing, and medicine to soldiers and other combatants. Additionally, some non-combatant women in the military (FLN) were in charge of “informing the women of the civilian population about the political situation, providing support and advice on hygiene, and being in charge of cooking.” Along with basic advice on hygiene, women offered important nursing services for both the wounded soldiers and the civilian population with little to no medical supplies. One of the most prominent ways that women were able to contribute to the liberation movement without picking up arms or fighting was the wearing of the veil. The citizens of Algeria fighting for liberation from the French and majority Christian occupation were Muslim. That being said, the veil is the traditional head-scarf that Muslim women wore - something that the French despised as it made them stand out and look less Western. The veil symbolized the Algerian's “allegiance to cultural traditions” and their “refusal to be ‘won over’ or ‘penetrated’ by western men.” The veil was a form of patriotism and protest against the French and its occupation. Although most women were non-combatants, they were just as passionate about the liberation movement as men. Most women participated in the tasks listed above and had to come home to take care of their families while many men left to fight and did not return for days on end. Women from urban centers had a different experience and role in the war than women in rural areas. Urban women were usually recruited to the FLN, either the civilian or military arm, or joined because of their family. These urban women compromised about 20% of all women in the war, making them the minority compared to women in rural areas. Women in rural areas were typically drawn into the war and FLN more naturally due to their location, as most of the fighting took place in rural parts of Algeria. Their rural location allowed them to carry out guerilla warfare more easily than those living in urban areas. Activity within the FLN, The National Liberation Front, was primarily through its civilian arm and military arm - the National Liberation Army. The reality was that “rural women in maquis [rural areas] support networks” contained the overwhelming majority of those who participated. This is not to marginalize those women who did engage in acts of violence, but simply to illustrate that they constituted in the minority.

== Female combatants ==
Despite the fact that destruction of civilian and military targets by women through paramilitary activities included less than seventy women, or about 2% of the total females in the military arm of the FLN. While this may seem like a small amount, it is about the same number of women who fought in World War II. The women participating in combat wore uniforms and trained just like their male counterparts which was rare in the Islamic faith. Their jobs “included paramilitary activities such as throwing bombs at civilian targets or attacking policemen and individuals considered collaborators/traitors.” When out of uniform, women were arguably more dangerous. Since Algerian women were viewed as less dangerous by the French than Algerian men, they could get away with more or get by unnoticed, carrying bombs or other weapons in their purses, strollers, and under their clothing. Essentially, they became “mobile arsenals”. While it may seem contradictory, some women were also recruited to the FLN due to their European appearance. This allowed them to pass as French checkpoints and security to carry out certain tasks or attacks. While they were in the minority, the women who did contribute to the liberation movement via combat helped and furthered the movement significantly. Both combatants and noncombatants, did not cut any slack from the French. Around 2,200 women were captured and tortured by the French over the course of the liberation war. Many were also raped, beaten and killed by French soldiers.

A reason for such attention was that included in the women who perpetrated direct violence against the French were Djamila Boupacha, Samia Larkhdari, and Djamila Bouhired, combatants in the Battle of Algiers. Eventually captured, the trials of these women, specifically Bouhired, gained recognition from international audiences. Another reason is that the violent nature of such activities, especially when carried out by women, were much more sensational than feeding and nursing FLN soldiers.

== Oral testimonies ==
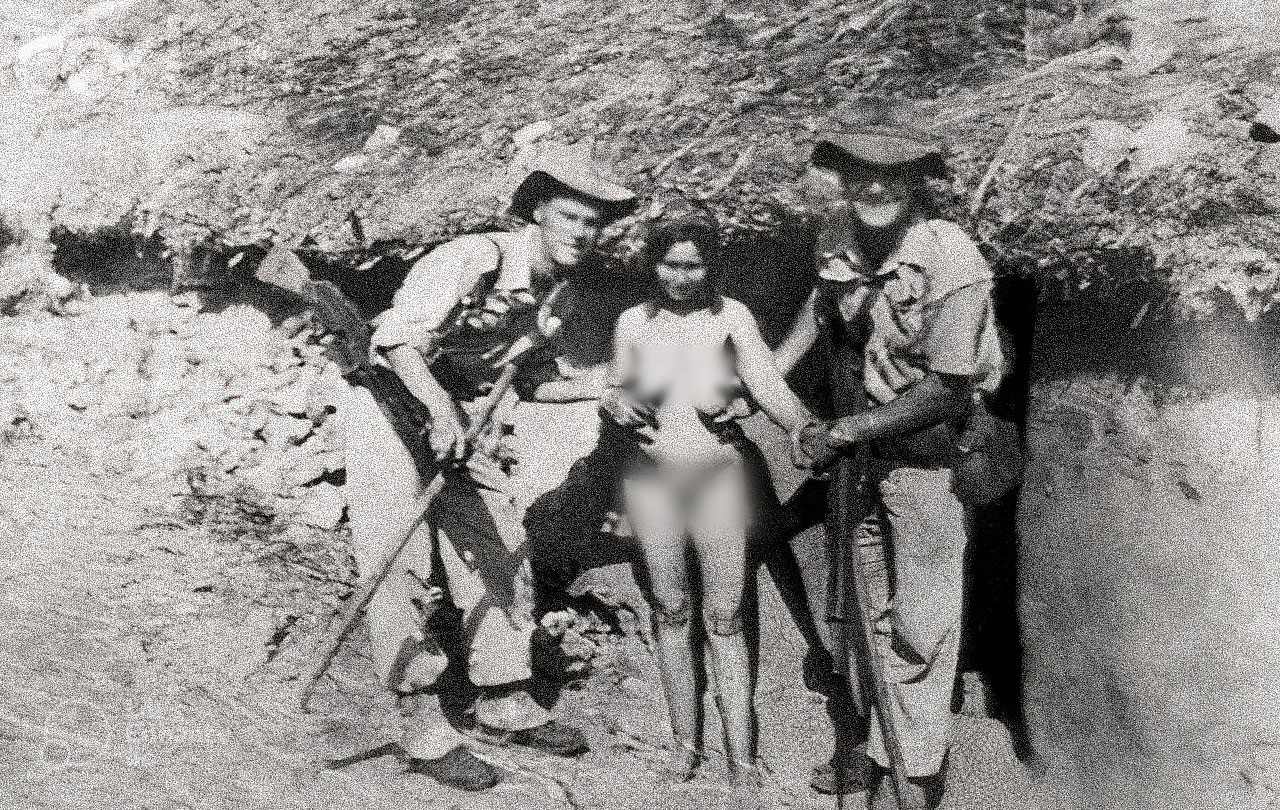
An Algerian woman being sexually abused by two French soldiers

As a result of mujahidat and fidayat not having many written accounts about them, oral testimonies have been the main source in understanding the significance of women's roles in the FLN-ALN and their contributions to the Algerian War. While these important pieces of testimony give a voice to women who were often "excluded from the history and memory of the Algerian War as well as victimized in postcolonial Algeria," there remain many omissions in the oral accounts of women combatants.

Some particularly difficult issues that are often excluded from oral testimonies relate to "marriages in the maquis and the FLN-ALN's control of women's sexuality in the maquis." As noted by scholar Ryme Seferdjeli, "In two interviews with mujahidat (Layla Ettayeb and Djamila Amrane) who married in the maquis, they categorically refused to speak about the circumstances in which they got married; nor would they make any comment on it". Another example of why testimonies of rape and torture of the women combatants in Algeria do not come to light can be seen in the story of a mujahida named Louisette Ighilahriz. When Ighilahriz "published her story admitting to having been tortured and raped during the Algerian War, she received little support from other mujahidat." This can be accounted for by the fact that revealing such violence, especially of a sexual nature, is considered a taboo and reliving such trauma can be extremely difficult for survivors of sexual violence.

Therefore, few women combatants are prepared to publicly admit personal stories of the torture and rape that took place during the war. Further, by revealing accounts of sexual violence and subjugation during the war, mujahidat would be seen as victimized women rather than courageous fighters who were absolute members of the ALN. During and after the war, the FLN rhetoric was very much focused on spreading a heroic image of the mujahidat, "in order to achieve public recognition" and as a form of revolutionary propaganda, which may have influenced the oral testimonies of the mujahidat. In an interview with an unnamed mujahida she acknowledged that:

"It is difficult to write history. There are things we will never be able to tell. I have to admit that I would have difficulties in invoking certain points or details."

In another interview with a mujahida named Houria, when the interviewer and historian Chérifa Bouatta, "asked about the nature of the affective and sexual relationships" with Houria's first husband, she immediately answered, "No, we don't talk about that."

== Media representation ==
Women's roles in the Algerian Liberation Movement have also been represented in the media. One of the most notable examples of women combatants can be seen through the historically accurate film called “The Battle of Algiers.” In one scene, three European-looking Algerian women can easily get past French guards and place bombs in three different public and heavily French-populated locations. These surprise bombings carried out by the three Algerian women resulted in mass French casualties. “The three women who carried bombs to French quarters in Algiers were Drif, Lakhdari, and Djamila Bouhired. All three would go on to become legendary heroes of Algerian independence.” While they were in the minority, the women who did contribute to the liberation movement via combat helped and furthered the movement significantly.

On the other hand, The Book, Les Enfants du nouveau monde, (Children of the New World: A Novel of the Algerian War) by Assia Djebar discusses the significant gender gap between men and women during the time. This book shows that despite the notable female involvement at the time of the Liberation War, “women face an indigenous patriarchal structure so deeply rooted it may not change with independence.”

== Covert operations ==
In addition to general support tasks, women possessed gender-specific abilities that allowed them to carry out clandestine tasks that would have proved difficult for men. Though women used these capabilities in both the urban and rural arenas of the war, it was the nature of the urban dimension of the war that contained the highest concentration, both in number and frequency, of covert activities by females. The best documented example of this is in the Battle of Algiers. In this battle male FLN operatives, driven underground by the French, stayed out of the public realm, avoiding detention and interrogation, while the women who helped to keep them hidden were able to move about freely and smuggle weapons and other sensitive materials as a result of their manipulation of personal appearance. The manner in which women did this was twofold; first by the religious practice of wearing the veil, which the French saw as above suspicion, or, adopting a European appearance seeming to demonstrate their adherence to French values and way of life. Women like Djamila Bouhired, due to the incapacitation of men, were also charged with carrying out terrorist attacks ordered by FLN leadership and did so by again using changes in dress to their advantage.

The desire to pull off the veil by the French manifested because the Algerian woman was a target of French male lust. To not arouse suspicion, Algerian women used Western-style implements like strollers and handbags to conceal explosives while sporting western attire without any veils.

An attempted bombing was carried out by Yasmine Belkacem, but perhaps the most famous incident involving Algerian women revolutionaries during the Battle of Algiers was the Milk Bar Café bombing of 1956, when Djamila Bouhired, Zohra Drif, Samia Lakhdari, and Yacef Saâdi planted three bombs: one in a cafeteria on the Rue Michelet, one in the Air France office in the Mauritania building in Algiers, which did not explode, and a final one at the Milk Bar Café, which killed 3 young women and injured multiple adults and children. Algerian Communist Party-member Raymonde Peschard was initially accused of being an accomplice to the bombing and was forced to flee from the colonial authorities. In September 1957, Drif was arrested and sentenced to twenty years in the Barbarossa prison but was ultimately pardoned by Charles de Gaulle on the anniversary of Algerian independence in 1962.

== FLN and women ==
"Some historians argue that the leaders and male combatants generally accepted the presence of women in the maquis, seeing them as sisters in combat. Others claim that they were on the whole hostile to the presence of women in military units."

Externally the FLN pursued policies that highlighted women in the Algerian War. El Moudjahid, a publication of the FLN, sought to create the ‘myth’ of the female warrior and to idolize her as a martyr and linchpin in the war. Articles published, including contributions by women to a series ‘Diary of a Guerilla’, cast the female in a heroic light highlighting her bravery and contributions to the war effort. The writings of Frantz Fanon also lent themselves to FLN propaganda because he championed the idea that by simply participating in the war women were engaging in an act of liberation. The FLN was then able to formulate a motivation for women based on an “abstract notion of ‘freedom’” linked with strong nationalism as opposed to a goal of social progress, avoiding the need to engage in a discussion of women’s issues because they equated it to freedom from colonial rule. Publicly, the FLN identified the contributions of women, but avoided promising specific rewards as a result.

Internally FLN attitudes towards women are described in a statement by an FLN commander Si Allal:

“it is forbidden to recruit djoundiates [female soldiers] and nurses without the zone’s authorization. In independent Algeria, the Muslim woman’s freedom stops at the door of her home. Woman will never be equal to man”

There existed obstacles precluding the involvement of women, including desire by some men to not subject women to any additional danger outside of the significant risks of simply living in Algeria at this time; the dramatic change, which many FLN members were not convinced could occur, that would be required of women going from secluded home life to active participation; and a general lack of trust in women, especially their ability to keep FLN secrets if captured. Upon entry into the resistance there were additional requirements as well, an investigation of adultery that carried a penalty of death, and a possible test of her virginity. The involvement of women, especially those who were literate and had proactive tendencies, sometimes made their often-illiterate male counterparts uncomfortable. As a result of this and other factors the FLN enacted a deportation to surrounding countries of these progressive female elements, a large percentage of which were removed from Algeria by 1958.

According to scholar Ryme Seferdjeli, "Women have been reluctant to address the question of marriages in the maquis". While marriages did occur during the war, whether or not marriages were ever forced has not been entirely determined. Many interviewed women combatants were evasive in regards to the topic of marriage within the maquis. Further, within "a few wilayat the FLN strongly encouraged mujahidat to marry" and many mujahidat "who joined the ALN during the war ended up marrying" the male combatants in the maquis. The ALN "authorized or forbade marriages" depending on the wilaya and if at the time the ALN found marriages to be problematic or beneficial.

Historian and former combatant Djamila Minne, who interviewed many former women combatants, explains that:

"Beyond those feelings of suspicion and hostility, or admiration and glorification, deep bonds of affection were established, which were the result of long periods spent together and dangers faced together. During the interviews, it struck me that out of 47 women militants who married during or after the war, 38 are married with men militants. Now, for a fighter, to get married with a woman fighter is the best proof of accepting the fight she engaged in and of esteem for what she has been".

== France and women ==
By 1957, largely through torture of captured women, the French came to acknowledge the different roles played by female FLN members including their terrorist actions. Around this time the French initiated a campaign of ‘emancipation’ directed at Muslim women that sought to draw them away from the FLN. This included the Plan de Constantine aimed at increasing female education, Ordonnance 59-274 giving women more say in their marital status, public unveiling of female Algerians by French women, extension of the vote to women in 1957, and the symbolic installation of Muslim women in public office, among others. Unfortunately for the French this campaign, while it did have some successes, was largely ineffective.

=== Harkis ===
Harkettes is the generic name given to native Algerian women who served as auxiliaries to the French Army during the Algerian War. The French named them after their male counterparts, the Harkis.

Indigenous Algerian auxiliaries who fought for the French army, male or female, were called harkas. The use of the diminutive -ette with the term harkette has been suggested by one historian as "clearly condescending".

== Post-war ==
Scholars disagree on the effect of female participation in the FLN on women's rights after the conflict. For example, Laura Sjoberg and Caron E. Gentry claim that women in Algeria, regardless of their involvement and contributions to the conflict, nevertheless remained in their pre-war subservient position afterward as a result of the prevailing societal, religious, and cultural conditions. On the other hand, Natalia Vince writes that, "to argue that the war years were a period of relative freedom for rural women…in which they had more opportunities to enter into the public sphere and mix with men, which in turn led to either a permanent change in attitudes or a return to male dominance and separate spheres once the war ended, is to adopt an analysis that rural interviewees would not use themselves."

== Portrayal of Algerian women in colonial postcards ==
Algerian author and poet Malek Alloula (1937-2015) in the Colonial Harem (2004) recollects colonial postcards of Algerian women during their “Golden Age”, that being the time period between 1900 and 1930. In Principle, postcards are characterized with “having neither depth nor aesthetic pretensions”. They are supposed to be this neutral mean of communication between people from different locations. However, in the Colonial Harem, Alloula deconstructs this common assumption, and shows how colonial postcards became “one of the forms of the aesthetic justification of colonial violence”.

When French armies settled in Algeria, along with them came photographers and artists eager to explore the Orient, this “Other” mystical and exotic place that used to be the dreamland for the West. Alloula notes how this is a revival of an orientalism that was maintained by no longer popular paintings. In a way, colonial postcards reactivate the obsessive eagerness with the Orient and democratize the practice of orientalism: access to the Orient's perceived exoticism becomes affordable and reachable to all: the tourist, the soldier, and the colonizer, who are all enthralled by the idea of taking a glimpse of a North African city.

But Alloula argues very clearly that postcards are a source of a “pseudoknowledge of the colony”. They do not represent Algeria nor its women truthfully, but they rather project their phantasmal scenarios and stereotypes imported from the West on them. In this sense, Alloula draws the powerful conclusion that colonial postcards distort the Algerian society's structure, traditions and customs.

This is best illustrated by the portrayal of Algerian women through these postcards, which constitutes the theme of Alloula's book. The idea of the private, veiled Algerian women in her harem obsessively interests and enthralls the West. She is imagined as this erotic, sensual, almost mystical creature, laying leisurely in her Harem. In this stereotypical idea lies the very motivation of the colonial photographer: he goes to Algeria to finally capture what he has long imagined and dreamed of. Yet, the first thing that strikes the photographer is that Algerian women, contrary to his expectations, are unreachable. They are veiled, and their body is not inviting to be explored and photographed. Alloula elegantly says that the veil stands as the symbol as a brutal rejection for the photographer, as it completely shatters his hopes for voyeurism: “the exoticism that he thought he could handle without any problems suddenly discloses to him a truth unbearable for the further exercise of his craft”. Alloula even goes further into observing how the photographer is caught at his own game: the Algérienne, through her gaze “concentrated by the tiny orifice for the eye” just like that of a camera, is the one capturing the photographer.

Thus, the photographer feels challenged, but not any less discouraged. In fact, he pursues his endeavor through staging photographs to meet his desired imagined scenarios. If Algerian women will not engage in entertaining his desires, he will pay models recruited from the margins of society to do so. In his studio, he would meticulously try to enact his phantasms through controlling everything: from the decorations and the attire of the model to her posing and gaze. He first starts by unveiling the model and goes further into demanding that she exposes her breasts, so as to eroticize the Algerian women's body. The very act of unveiling argues Alloula, is the starting point of the “distorting enterprise” that is the postcard. It is distorting in the sense that it abruptly changes the Algerian women's reality, by projecting and imposing on her western imported orientalist dreams and scenarios. The act of unveiling stands as a “symbolic revenge upon a society that continues to deny him access and questions the legitimacy of his desire”. It is a tool of possession, of domination and of violence, as it appropriates and objectifies the body of the Algerian women. Thus, the colonial postcard becomes the embodiment of “the colonial spirit in picture form”, and the instrument of what Alloula calls "a double appropriation": one of space, referring to how the photographer's studio is transformed to distort Algerian reality, and one of the body, referring to how the model's body is objectified to please the photographer and the imperial ideology.

Of the most striking collections of postcards that Alloula presents and analyses in his book are the ones portraying Algerian women in prison and the ones showing “traditional” Algerian couples.

Women in prison:

The photographer stages scenarios of Algerian women imprisoned in their own homes. The paradoxical nature of this idea is fully intentional. It bears the unsettling message that the Algerian women, because she is veiled, is oppressed in her own society. The religious and cultural value of the veil is distorted by the photographer and transformed into a tool of oppression. This shows how colonial postcards stands as another aspect of French colonial policy as a subversion of Algerian identity and reality. By staging photographs of imprisoned women in their own homes, the photograph sends a clear message to the world: French presence in Algeria is meant to liberate Algerian women from the oppression that their own traditions and men impose upon them. The colonial enterprise is thus abusively justified through exploiting the noble idea of feminism to serve France's colonial machine.

Couples:

Another striking illustration of how the colonial postcard imposes the Western reality on Algerian society and distorts the reality of Algeria is staging couple photographs. Alloula argues that the idea of the couple is imported because Algerian society's foundation is the family that extends to the clan or the tribe, and that goes beyond a mere association between two individuals. In other words, the western idea of the couple is inconceivable in Algerian society. Yet, the photographer, as clearly demonstrated by Alloula, does not intend to truthfully portray Algerian society. He instead projects western imported stereotypes and principles upon it, without any consideration to the “social equilibrium” that is intended to be preserved by not mixing the sexes in Algerian society. Through this book, Alloula shows that colonial postcards were not just colonial postcards, their scope goes beyond their so-called informative and communicative purpose. They stand as a tool of colonial dominance over Algerian women, and thus over the Arab World: “Possession of Arab women came to serve as a surrogate for and means to the political and military conquest of the Arab world”. Alloula further argues how the eroticized Algerian women portrayed in these postcards metaphorically stand as “trophies” of war. Women have a symbolic value in a war, their raiding is the ultimate reward of the victor, and they are the “spoils of victory” and the “warrior’s reward”. Unveiled and sexualized, these colonial postcards fallaciously claim to have liberated Algerian women from the prison that is the Harem.

== Films ==
- Jamila, the Algerian by Youssef Chahine (1958)
- The Battle of Algiers by Gillo Pontecorvo (1966)

== See also ==
- Women in Algeria
- Women in Arab societies
- Women in the decolonisation of Africa
- Women in Islam
