= Mohamed Garne =

Algerian War Activist

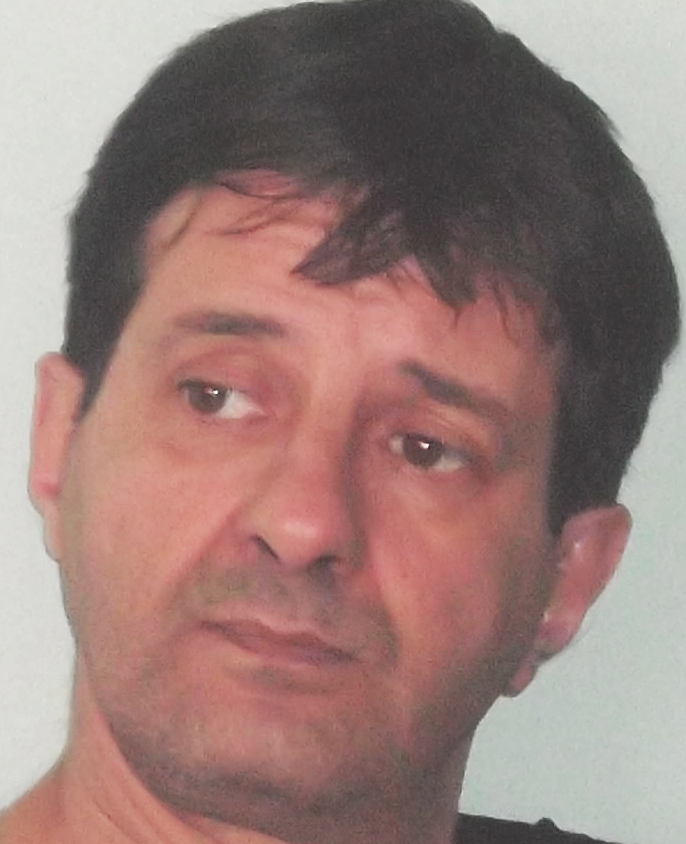
- Garne in 2014
- Born: April 19, 1960 (age 66); El Attaf, Aïn Defla, Algeria

Mohamed Garne (born 19 April 1960) is an Algerian man best known for his activism related to victims of the Algerian War.

== Early life and family ==
Kheira Garne, Mohamed's biological mother, was 15 years old when she was taken to the Theniet El Had detention camp, where she was tortured and raped by soldiers of the French Army. After becoming pregnant, the soldiers tried to make her miscarry by kicking her in the stomach and continued to rape and abuse her throughout her pregnancy.

At his birth, Mohamed Garne was separated from Kheira because she was deemed incapable of caring for her child. He was entrusted to several wet nurses, under whose care he was very poorly treated. He was later found anorexic in a hospital in Algiers, with a skull fracture. Subsequently, a couple of writers decided to adopt him; however, when he was fifteen, the couple separated and forced him to return to the orphanage.

His adoptive parents are the novelist and academician Fatima-Zohra Imahlayène (pen name Assia Djebar), and Ahmed Ould-Rouis (pen name Walid Garn) who together wrote the play Rouge l’aube (lit. 'The Red Dawn').

After a melancholic period marked by alcohol and self-harm, in 1986 Garne began searching for his biological mother. He found her one evening in September 1988 in the Algerian capital.

== Legal cases ==
=== In Algeria ===
In 1991, Mohamed Garne initiated legal action against the Bengoucha family, claiming his mother's rights, as he believes himself to be the son of a forgotten martyr named Abdelkader Bengoucha. The case was taken up by the court, then by the court of appeal of Theniet El Had, and finally before the Supreme Court of Algeria in March 1994. It was before this latter institution that, on 22 March 1994, Kheira told the judge Garne had been conceived through rape.

=== In France ===
Garne obtained French nationality in 1996, but the legal status of "war victim" was denied to him. In 1998, he initiated a new legal action against the Ministry of Defence. On 22 November 2001, the Paris Court of Appeal delivered a ruling recognising Mohamed Garne as a "war victim" . On these grounds, the magistrates granted him a 30% disability pension for three years for "psychological disorders" relating to the blows inflicted upon his mother during her pregnancy. He is the first victim for whom the courts have officially acknowledged the abuses committed by certain French soldiers during the Algerian War, who were granted amnesty following the Évian Accords.

Garne continues to fight to obtain all of his rights and those of his mother. He has brought an action before the French courts against the French Ministry of Defence for war crimes and crimes against humanity.

Following François Hollande's visit to Algeria on 19 December 2012, Mohamed Garne spoke out in an interview, expressing his desire to dismantle the barriers imposed by both states (Algerian and French), and he raised the issue of amnesty resulting from the Évian Treaty.

== Writing and media presence ==
Garne wrote an autobiographical book, first published in France under the title Lettre à ce père qui pourrait être vous (Letter to the Father You Could Be), a work he subsequently reissued in Algeria under its original title Français par le crime, j’accuse! (French by Crime, I Accuse!).

He has participated in several television programmes, including Envoyé spécial (lit. 'Special Correspondent'), and has collaborated on short films on both shores of the Mediterranean. He is currently preparing the screenplay for a French film denouncing the consequences of 132 years of French colonisation.
