= Thomas Reppetto =

American police officer (1931–2020)

- Born: Thomas Anthony Reppetto; August 17, 1931; Chicago, Illinois, U.S.
- Died: May 5, 2020 (aged 88); Mount Vernon, New York, U.S.
- Education: PhD, Harvard University (public administration); BA, MA, Roosevelt University
- Occupations: Crime historian, author, educator, researcher, police detective / officer
- Years active: 1952-2020 (his death)
- Spouse(s): Cecelia Seibert, ?-? (divorced); Christa Carnegie (?-2020, his death)
- Children: 1 child, with Seibert

Thomas Anthony Reppetto (August 17, 1931 – May 5, 2020) was a police officer, crime watchdog, historian, educator, and author. He was a commander of detectives in the Chicago Police Department and the president of New York City's Citizens Crime Commission for over 25 years. He was the dean of the John Jay College of Criminal Justice in New York.

== Childhood ==
Reppetto was born in Chicago. His mother was a secretary for the Chicago Police Department and his father was a saloonkeeper who spent time in prison for a variety of criminal activities. Reppetto visited his father in prison on Sundays.

== Education ==
Reppetto attended Roosevelt University in Chicago. While he was working in the Chicago Police Department, he got a PhD in public administration from Harvard University.

== Career ==
Reppetto joined the Chicago Police department in 1952 and became the commander of detectives. While working there, he pursued his PhD, but once it was completed and he rejoined the force, but, however, he was sidelined from holding advanced positions.

In 1970 he became a criminal justice researcher at the Joint Center for Urban Studies of M.I.T. and Harvard. In 1971 he moved to be a professor at New York City's John Jay College of Criminal Justice; he eventually served as dean and vice president of the school.

In 1979, Reppetto was approached by a group of businessmen who formed the nonpartisan New York City's Citizens Crime Commission. He served as the president of the commission for over 20 years. He advised New York City mayors on how to reduce crime, pointing to many historical mistakes which led to public distrust and unrest of police officers.

== Publications ==
He wrote American Mafia, Bringing Down the Mob, Blue Parade, Battleground New York City, American Detective, and Shadows over the White House.

He also wrote about the criminal justice system for the New York Post.
