= Specialized Administrative Sections =

French civil-military program in French Algeria (1955–1962)

The Specialized Administrative Sections (Sections Administratives Spécialisé), or (SAS), was a French civil-military program operating in French Algeria from 1955 to 1962.

== About ==
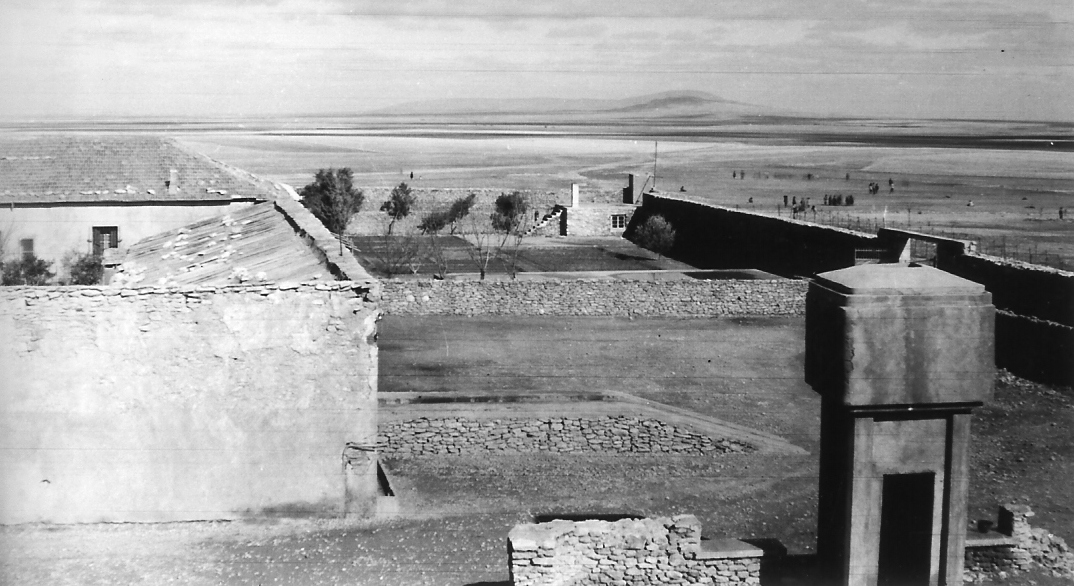
SAS fortified farm in 1960

The SAS was created in 1955 by the Governor-General of Algeria Jacques Soustelle to provide a hearts and minds program to provide rural Algerian villagers with practical help and provide a visible French presence thus improving their daily lives while simultaneously protecting them. Several hundred small volunteer teams led by Arabic speaking junior officers with local knowledge. The well funded SAS program covered public health, education, building, agricultural assistance and justice administration It also provided local counter-insurgency intelligence and security forces liaison. The officers were known by their headgear as "kepis bleus" and were men serving in remote areas and were protected by a handful of local Moghazni auxiliaries. Their popularity made them targets with the FLN.

General tasks of the leaders of these sections was published in a presidential decree by the French President Charles de Gaulle No. 019-59 dated September 2, 1959.

== Field organization ==
The SAS was organized into four-man teams each with thirty to forty auxiliaries for security, these teams spread all over the country providing traditional colonial administrative, social, and economic assistance to disadvantaged native populations. About 660 teams were ultimately fielded from a total civil affairs personnel strength of 5,000.

== Uniforms ==
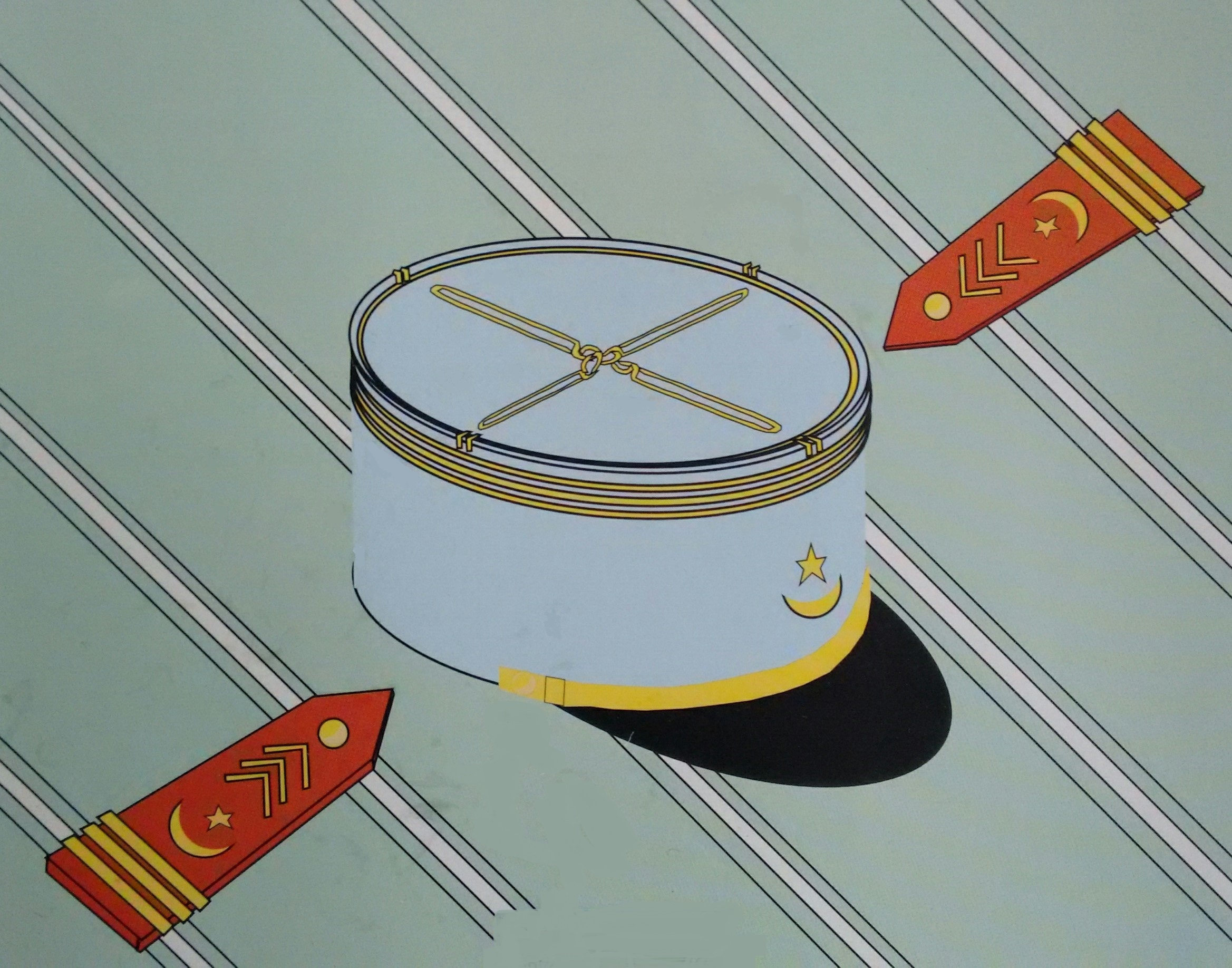
The SAS "Képi-bleu".

Officers wore a sky blue Kepi and dark red shoulder boards. Their badge was a 5 point gold star over a gold crescent moon.

== Bibliography ==
- Jacques Fremeaux, Les Bureaux arabes dans l'Algérie de la conquête (The Arab Bureaus in Conquest Algeria), Paris, Denoel, 1993,
- France Parisy-Vinchon, Là où la piste s'arrête (Where the track ends), Issy-les-Moulineaux, Muller Edition, 1992,
- Gregor Mathias, Les sections administratives spécialisées en Algérie : Entre idéal et réalité (Specialized administrative sections in Algeria: Between ideal and reality), L'Harmattan, 1998,

== See also ==
- Bureaux arabes
- Civil-military operations
- Winning hearts and minds, the idea of persuading enemies instead of defeating them by force.
- Hearts and Minds (Vietnam), a strategy of the South Vietnamese and United States governments to defeat the Viet Cong insurgency during the Vietnam War.
