= Torture during the Algerian War =

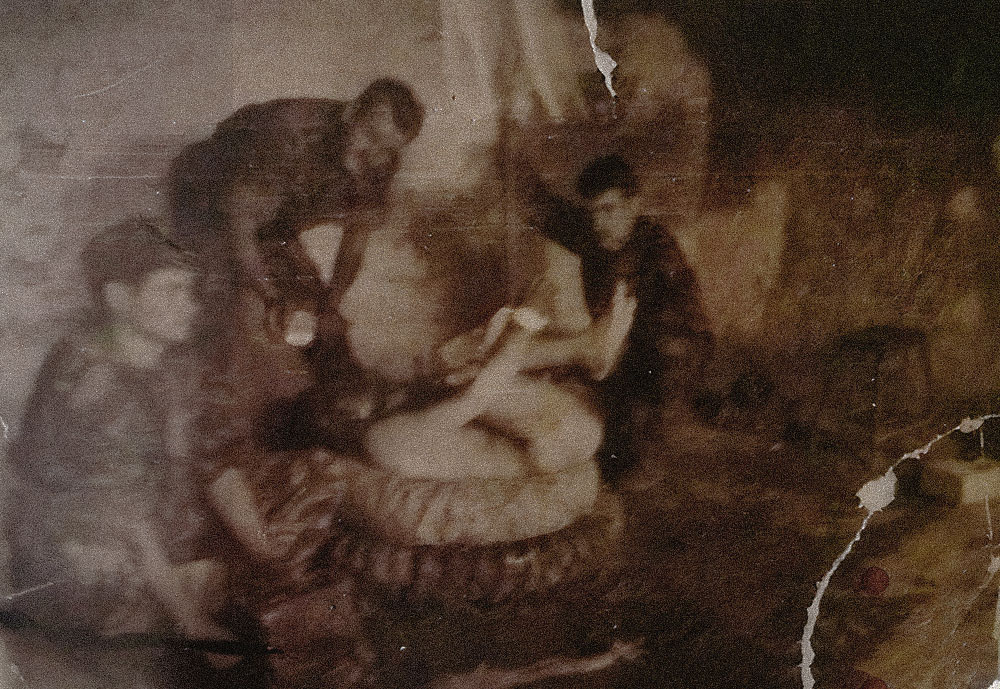
An Algerian is submerged in water and tortured by the French army using electricity, while two tires serve as containers (1961).

Elements from the French Armed Forces used deliberate torture during the Algerian War (1954–1962), creating an ongoing public controversy. Pierre Vidal-Naquet, a renowned French historian, estimated that there were "hundreds of thousands of instances of torture" by the French military in Algeria.

== Overview ==
The Algerian War was an armed conflict between the French Armed Forces and the Algerian National Liberation Front between the years 1954-1962 which ended with Algeria gaining independence from France. The French state itself refused to see the colonial conflict as a war, as that would recognize the other party (the National Liberation Front, FLN) as a legitimate entity. Thus, until 10 August 1999, the French Republic persisted in calling the Algerian War a simple "operation of public order" against the FLN "terrorism."

Since France did not consider the conflict to be a war but rather "maintaining order" in the country, it did not consider itself tied by Common Article 3 of the 1949 Geneva Conventions, which only mandates the humane treatment of persons in a non-interstate conflict. Besides prohibiting the use of torture, Common Article 3 gave the International Committee of the Red Cross (ICRC) access to the detainees. Those detained by the French were considered criminals and therefore did not receive the treatment that should be granted to them under Common Article 3. It wasn't until it became public knowledge in 1957 that the French government was using torture that they began to grant more rights to captured rebels. In 1957 the leader of the French Army in Algeria, Raoul Salan, announced that they would start treating captured enemies “as close as possible as the way in which prisoners of war are taken care of by civilized countries.” The following year saw creation of internment camps for prisoners, but the French government continued with their stance that the conflict was not a war.

Early in the war, the FLN was progressively assuming control in Algeria through targeted acts against French nationals and Algerians supporting the French. From 1954 to 1956, the amount of violence massively increased, accompanied by summary executions and internment in camps by the French army. Justified by the notion of "terrorism", torture was used indiscriminately against FLN detainees and civilians suspected of aiding the FLN. General Salan, commander-in-chief of the French forces in Algeria, had developed in Indochina a theory of "counter-revolutionary warfare" that included the use of torture.

The ICRC was authorized by Radical-Socialist prime minister Pierre Mendès France on 2 February 1955, to have access to the detainees for short missions of one month, but their report "was not to be made public." His government had to resign three days later. According to historian Raphaëlle Branche, "it was as if Mendès France was preparing for his departure by setting up as many protective barriers as possible." The French Army did not consider the detainees as POWs, but as PAM (French acronym for "taken captive while in possession of weapons", pris les armes à la main).

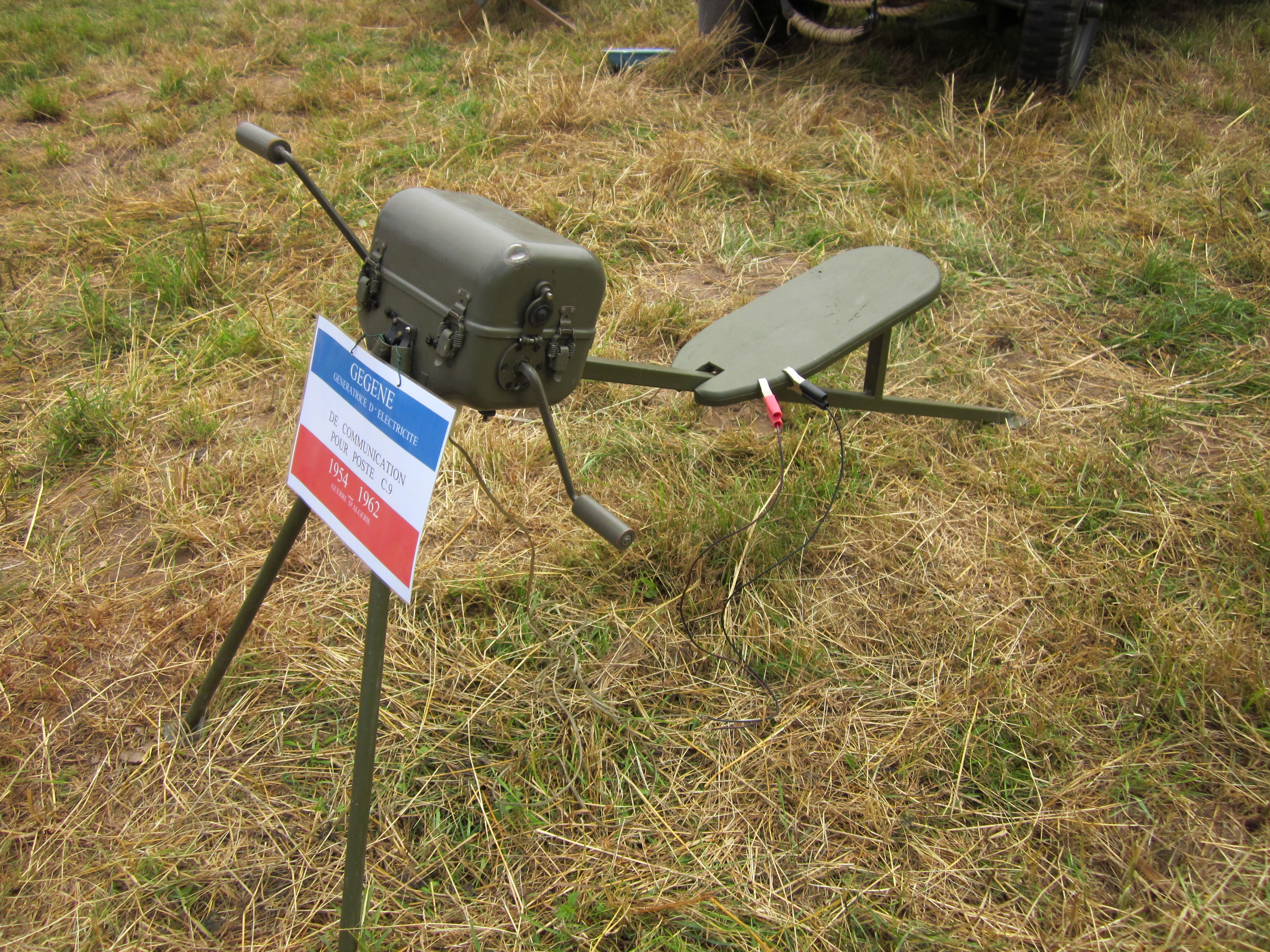
"Gégène", a device used by the French forces to generate electricity; electrodes would then be attached to the victim's body parts for electric torture

Although the use of torture quickly became well-known and was opposed by the left-wing opposition, the French state repeatedly denied its employment, censoring more than 250 books, newspapers and films (in metropolitan France alone) which dealt with the subject and 586 in Algeria. Henri Alleg's 1958 book, La Question, Boris Vian's 1954 song Le Déserteur, and Jean-Luc Godard's 1960 film Le Petit Soldat (released in 1963) are famous examples of such censorship. A confidential report of the ICRC leaked to Le Monde newspaper confirmed the allegations of torture made by the opposition to the war, represented in particular by the French Communist Party (PCF) and other anti-militarist circles. Although many left-wing activists, including famous existentialists writers Jean-Paul Sartre and Albert Camus, and historian Pierre Vidal-Naquet, denounced without exception the use of torture, the French government was itself headed in 1957 by the general secretary of the French Section of the Workers' International (SFIO), Guy Mollet. In general, the SFIO supported the colonial wars during the Fourth Republic (1947–54), starting with the crushing of the Madagascar revolt in 1947 by the socialist government of Paul Ramadier.

The controversy over the use of torture continues to have echoes today. Already in 1977, British historian Alistair Horne wrote in A Savage War of Peace that torture was to become a growing cancer for France, leaving behind a poison that would linger in the French system long after the war itself had ended. At the time, Horne could not confirm or deny that torture had been ordered by the highest ranks of the military and civilian hierarchy of the French state. In 2001, General Paul Aussaresses confirmed that torture had been employed not only at large scale but also pursuant to orders by the French government.

=== Battle of Algiers (January–October 1957), state of emergency and ICRC report ===
The civilian authorities relinquished control to the military during the Battle of Algiers from January to October 1957. Thus, General Jacques Massu, commander of the 10th Parachute Division (10e DP), in charge during the Battle of Algiers, was to crush the insurgency by whatever means necessary. They threw hundreds of prisoners into the sea from the port of Algiers or by helicopter death flights. Since the corpses sometimes came back up to the surface, they began to pour concrete on their feet. These victims were known as "Bigeard's shrimps" ("crevettes Bigeard") after the surname of a notorious paratroop helicopter commander. French military chaplains quieted the troubled military's consciences. One of them, Louis Delarue, wrote a text distributed to all units:

If, in the general interest, the law allows a murderer to be killed, why should it be seen as monstrous to submit a delinquent who has been recognized as such, and is therefore liable to be put to death, to an interrogation which might be painful but whose only object is, thanks to the revelations he may make about his accomplices and leaders, to protect the innocent? Exceptional circumstances call for exceptional measures.

In 1958 General Salan set up special military internment centers for PAM rebels. The Minister of Interior declared a state of emergency, while the army engaged in a "struggle against the terrorism" of the FLN. Special powers were devolved to the military and were returned to civilian powers only in September 1959, when Charles de Gaulle made his speech on self-determination. General Salan refused to apply the Geneva Conventions ratified by France in 1951 because the detainees were not POWs. The civil authorities had different attitudes concerning the use of torture by the military. The IGAME (Inspecteur général en mission extraordinaire) of both Oran and Algiers chose to avoid the issue, whereas the IGAME of Constantinois, Maurice Papon (who died in 2007 after having been convicted for crimes against humanity for his role under Vichy), was actively involved in repression (Branche, 2004).

On 5 January 1960 the newspaper Le Monde published a summary of the report on the International Committee of the Red Cross (ICRC)'s seventh mission to Algeria. "Numerous cases of ill-treatment and torture are still being reported", the article disclosed, giving the ICRC's legitimacy to the many previously documented cases. A colonel in the French police force had told the delegates, "The struggle against terrorism makes it necessary to resort to certain questioning techniques as the only way of saving human life and avoiding new attacks." (Branche, 2004).

It was found much later that Gaston Gosselin, a member of the Ministry of Justice who was responsible for internment issues in metropolitan France, had leaked the report to the journalists of Le Monde. He had to resign a few months later, and the ICRC was prohibited for a year from undertaking any mission to Algeria.

=== Torture in school facilities ===
The French army occupied school buildings and converted the classrooms to "salles d'interrogatoire" (rooms of interrogation) where torture was practiced. The French army either entirely closed the schools, or used only part of the school. These include schools in Azzouza, Taourirt Moussa in Tizi Ouzou as early as 1956, and Algiers in 1960. Tassadit Yacine, Algerian anthropologist, has testified that as a pupil in the school in Mouzaïa-les-mines, torture was taking place in the room adjacent to her classroom. The practice was not isolated and was widespread across many regions in Algeria. Between 1955 and 1957, the FLN attacked and burned certain schools occupied by the French army to prevent their transformation into torture centers. In 1956, the FLN general strike appeal condemned the widespread torture in schools. Mouloud Feraoun, then a teacher, wrote letters to the inspectors of the department of education, denouncing the French army's occupation of schools and their use as places of torture.

=== Other testimony and descriptions ===
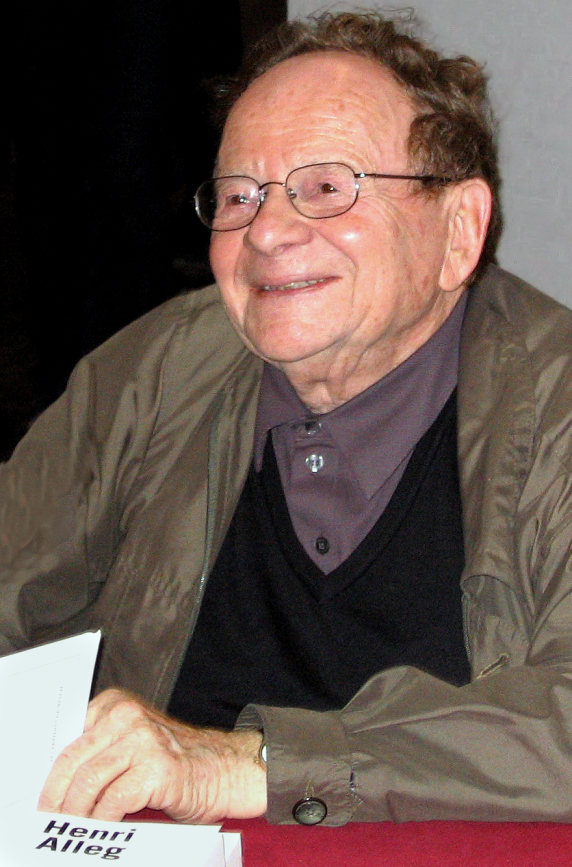
Henri Alleg

Henri Alleg, director of the Alger Républicain newspaper and of the Algerian Communist Party (PCA), who himself had been tortured, denounced it in La Question (Minuit, 1958), which sold 60,000 copies in one day. The title of his book referred to the Inquisition, who was said to put people "to the question." Alleg's book detailed the various torture methods, which included the infamous gégène (an electricity generator initially used for telephones), sleep deprivation, and truth serums, etc. Besides torturing actual suspects, the French military also buried alive old men.

Benoist Rey's book Les égorgeurs was also censored in April 1961. In the same year, he denounced torture as a "habitual repressive method, systematic, official, and massive."

According to an article of Verité Liberté published in 1961, "In the Ameziane farm, a CRA (Centre de renseignement et d'action, Information and Action Center) of Constantine it is practiced on "industrial scale". The suspects were arrested during raids, after having been denounced. Suspects were divided into two groups, those immediately interrogated and those who would be forced to wait a bit. The latter were deprived of food for from two to eight days in a blatant violation of the 1949 Geneva Conventions."

According to historian R. Branche, torture would begin with the systematic stripping of the victim. Beating was combined with many different techniques, among them hanging by the feet or hands, water torture, torture by electric shock, and rape. It was described by "Verité Liberté":

The interrogatories is done in accordance with the provisional guide of the intelligence agent (Guide provisoire de l'officier de renseignement, OR), chapter IV: first, the officer questions the prisoner in the "traditional" manner, hitting him with fist and kicking him. Then follows torture: hanging..., water torture..., electricity..., burning (using cigarettes, etc.)... Cases of prisoners who were driven insane were frequent... Between interrogation sessions, the suspects are imprisoned without food in cells, some of which were small enough to impede lying down. We must point out that some of them were very young teenagers and others old men of 75, 80 years or more.

According to the "Vérité Liberté", the end of these torture sessions was either liberation (often the case for women and for those who could pay), internment, or "disappearance." "The capacity of this center, opened in 1957, is of 500 to 600 persons...Since its constitution, it has "controlled" (incarcerated for fewer than 8 days) 108,175 persons; filed 11,518 Algerians as nationalist activists...; kept for a duration of more than 8 days 7,363 persons; interned to Hamma [an internment camp] 789 suspects."

== Colonialism ==
Torture was a procedure in use since the beginning of the colonization of Algeria, which was initiated by the July Monarchy in 1830. Directed by Marshal Bugeaud, who became the first Governor-General of Algeria, the invasion of Algeria was marked by a "scorched earth" policy and the use of torture, which were legitimized by a racist ideology.

Other historians also show that torture was fully a part of the colonialist system: "Torture in Algeria was engraved in the colonial act, it is the "normal" illustration of an abnormal system", wrote Nicolas Bancel, Pascal Blanchard, and Sandrine Lemaire, who have published decisive work on the phenomena of "human zoos." From the smokings (enfumades) of the Darha caves in 1844 by Pélissier to the 1945 riots in Sétif, Guelma and Kherrata", the repression in Algeria has used the same methods. Following 9 May 1945 Sétif massacres, other riots against the European presence occurred in Guelma, Batna, Biskra, and Kherrata, causing 103 deaths among the colonials. The repression of these riots officially caused 1,500 deaths, but N. Bancel, P. Blanchard, and S. Lemaire estimate it to be rather between 6,000 and 8,000 deaths.

Three years before the 1954 Toussaint Rouge insurrection, Claude Bourdet, a former Resistant wrote an article published on 6 December 1951 in L'Observateur, which was titled "Is there a Gestapo in Algeria?" Torture had also been used during the Indochina War (1947–54).

Historian Raphaëlle Branche, maîtresse de conférences in contemporary history at the University of Paris I – Sorbonne, who wrote her doctoral thesis on the use of torture during the Algerian war, noted that "in metropolitan France, torture did not attain the same height as in Algeria. It remained however, on both banks, a practice tolerated by the authorities and a form of violence to which Algerians knew they could be subjected."

== In metropolitan France ==
The war also affected metropolitan France. Little firm evidence exists about the use of torture by either side in France, but there were instances where French police or police auxiliaries may have engaged in torture as well as murder of FLN agents or protesters, and likewise the FLN may have used torture in eliminating opponents and collecting funds among Algerian expatriates in France.

From 1954 onward, the FLN sought to establish a politico-military organization among the 300,000 Algerians residing in France; by 1958, it had overwhelmed Messali Hadj's Algerian National Movement, despite the latter's popularity with Algerian expatriates at the onset of the war. Torture was occasionally used alongside beatings and killings to eliminate opponents of the FLN, and the death toll of this internecine violence within France alone was approximately 4,000. Subsequently, the FLN used this organization to obtain a "revolutionary tax" that FLN leader Ali Haroun estimates amounted to "80% of the [financial] resources of the rebellion"; this was partly done through extortion, in some instances by means of beatings and torture.

After being involved in early repression in Constantine, Algeria as prefect, Maurice Papon was named head of the Parisian police on 14 March 1958. Tensions increased after 25 August 1958, when an FLN guerilla offensive in Paris killed three policemen on boulevard de l'Hôpital in the 13th arrondissement and another in front of the cartoucherie de Vincennes, leading to arrests and jailing of Algerians suspected of supporting the FLN. In 1960 Papon created the Auxiliary Police Force (FPA – Force de police auxiliaire), which was made up of 600 Algerians by Autumn 1960 and operated in areas densely populated by Algerians in Paris and its suburbs. While incompletely evidenced, the strongest presumption of torture by the FPA pertains to two locations in the 13th arrondissement.

Further escalation occurred from August to October 1961 as the FLN resumed bombings against the French police, and killing 11 policemen and injured 17 (in Paris and its suburbs). This culminated on 17 October 1961, when the French police suppressed a demonstration by 30,000 Algerians who were ostensibly protesting against a de facto curfew imposed on them by the prefecture of police, though the FLN had planned the demonstration as a potential provocation as well. While estimates differ, the number of dead officially acknowledged (in French government reports and statements of 1998) in putting down this demonstration was 40 to 48. Some protesters may have been tortured before being killed and having their bodies thrown in the Seine.

An important issue within metropolitan France was public opinion, given that a substantial native population held a formal anticolonialist ideology (Communists, in particular) or was debating the war. The parties fought on this front too. The Prefecture of Police denied using torture or undue violence. Conversely, informers reported an organized campaign to implicate the FPA such that FLN "leaders and carefully chosen militants from the workers' residence in Vitry - 45, rue Rondenay - have been tasked with declaring in cafés and public places that they have suffered exactions, were robbed of pocketbooks or watches[...], and were victims of violence by the 'Algerian police'." A note diffused by the French arm of the FLN to its branches in September 1959 specifically focused on making claims of torture to influence the legal system:

For those of our brothers who will be arrested, it is important to specify what attitude they must adopt. Regardless of the way that the Algerian patriot is treated by police, he must in all circumstances, when presented to the prosecutor state that he has been beaten and tortured... He must never hesitate to accuse the police of torture and beatings. This greatly influences the judge and courts.

== Amnesties ==
The first amnesty was passed in 1962 by President Charles de Gaulle, by decree, preempting a parliamentary discussion that might have denied immunity to men like General Paul Aussaresses.

The second amnesty was enacted in 1968 by the National Assembly, which gave blanket amnesty to all acts committed during the Algerian war.

The OAS members were given amnesty by president François Mitterrand (PS), and a general amnesty for all war crimes was declared in 1982. Pierre Vidal-Naquet, among others, has qualified it as a "shame".

== Controversy during the war ==
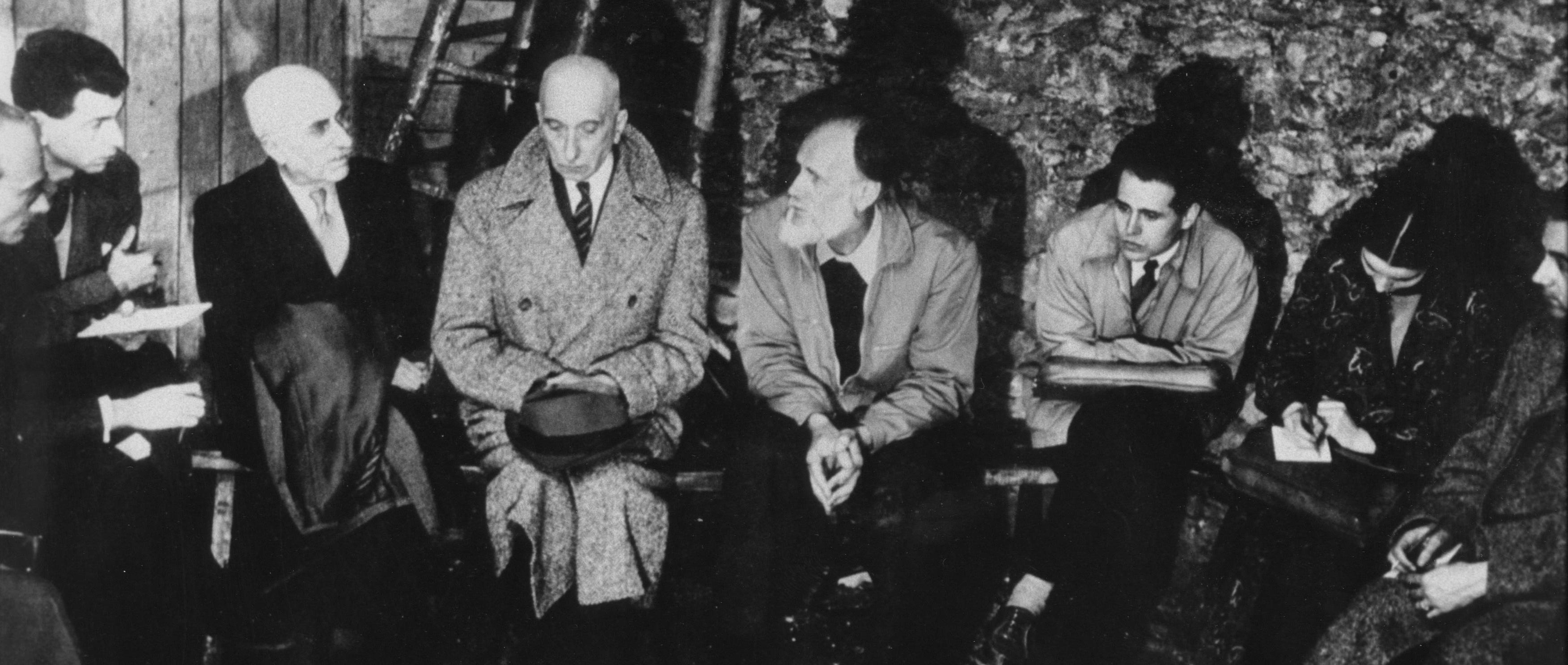
People fasting against torture in Paris, 1957 (Lanza del Vasto and Louis Massignon among others)

The systematic use of torture created a national controversy which has had lasting effects on French and Algerian society. As early as 2 November 1954, Catholic writer François Mauriac called against the use of torture in L'Express in an article titled Surtout, ne pas torturer ("Above all, do not torture.").

Two important officials, one civilian and another military, resigned because of the use of torture. The first was Paul Teitgen, former General Secretary of the Algiers Police, who had been himself tortured by the Gestapo. He resigned on 12 September 1957, in protest against the massive use of torture and extrajudicial killings. The other was General de Bollardière, who was the only army official to denounce the use of torture. He was put in charge of military arrests and then had to resign.

Torture was denounced during the war by many French left-wing intellectuals, members or not of the PCF, which maintained an anti-colonialist line. Under pressure from the left-wing opposition to the war and the use of torture, including the French Communist Party (PCF), the government, then led by Guy Mollet (SFIO), created a Commission of Safeguard of Rights and Individual Liberties, composed of various personalities named by the government, which gave the public its report in September 1957: according to it, torture was a frequent practice in Algeria. However, some claim that the main aim was in fact to absolve the French army of accusations and to gain time (Raphaëlle Branche, 2004).

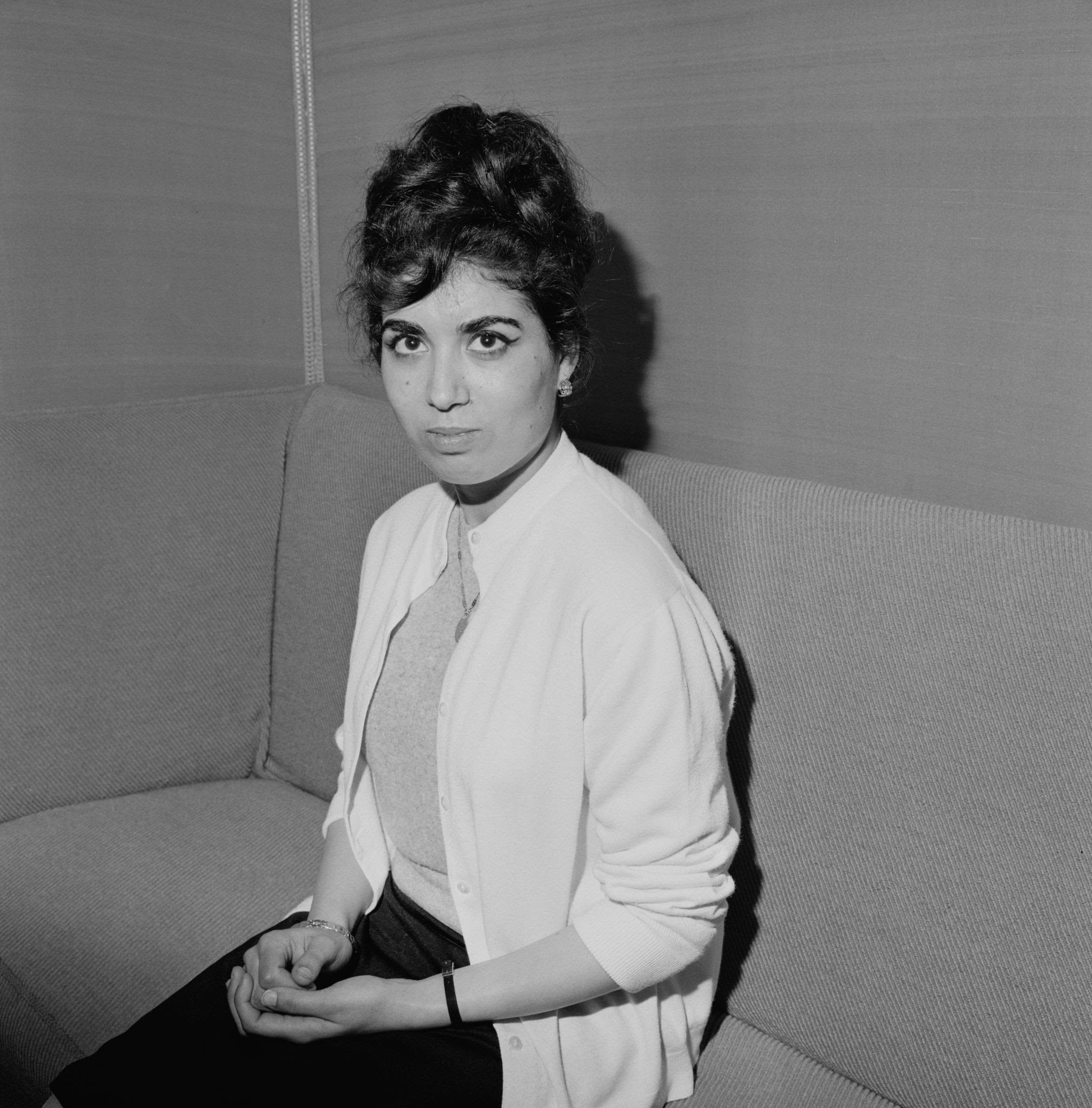
Djamila Boupacha, former FLN militant, was arrested when she was 22 years old and subjected to torture and rape

Henri Alleg, denounced it in La Question, which along with La Gangrène, by Bachir Boumaza, and Italian Communist Gillo Pontecorvo's 1966 film The Battle of Algiers were censored in France. Torture was also evoked during the trial of ALN activist Djamila Boupacha, defended by lawyer Gisèle Halimi. Writer Albert Camus, a Pied-noir and famous existentialist, tried unsuccessfully to persuade both sides to at least leave civilians alone, writing editorials against the use of torture in Combat newspaper. Other famous opponents of torture included Robert Bonnaud, who published on counsel of his friend Pierre Vidal-Naquet an article in 1956 in L'Esprit, a personalist review founded by Emmanuel Mounier (1905–1950). Bonnaud was later imprisoned in June 1961, on a charge of supporting the FLN. Pierre Vidal-Naquet, one of the many signatories to the Manifeste des 121 against torture, wrote a book, L'Affaire Audin (1957), and, as a historian, would continue to work on the Algerian War all his life. Beside Vidal-Naquet, famous signatories of the Manifeste des 121, published after the 1960 Barricades Week, included Robert Antelme, an Auschwitz survivor and writer, writers Simone de Beauvoir and Maurice Blanchot, Pierre Boulez, writer André Breton, Hubert Damisch, writer Marguerite Duras, Daniel Guérin, Robert Jaulin, Claude Lanzmann, Robert Lapoujade, Henri Lefebvre, writer Michel Leiris, Jérôme Lindon, editor of the Minuit publishing house, François Maspero, another editor, Théodore Monod, Maurice Nadeau, Jean-François Revel, Alain Robbe-Grillet, author and founder of the nouveau roman, writers Françoise Sagan, Nathalie Sarraute, Jean-Paul Sartre, and Claude Simon, Jean Bruller (Vercors), Jean-Pierre Vernant, Frantz Fanon, etc.

According to Henri Alleg, "in reality, the base of the problem was this unjust war itself. From the moment one starts a colonial war, i.e. a war to submit a people to one's will, one can issue all the laws one wants, but they will always be violated."

== 2000s controversies ==
General Jacques Massu defended the use of torture in his 1972 book, The True Battle of Algiers (La vraie bataille d'Alger). He later declared to Le Monde in 2000 that "torture was not necessary and that we could have decided not to use it".

Two days after the visit to France of Algerian president Abdelaziz Bouteflika, Louisette Ighilahriz, a former Armée de Libération Nationale activist, published her testimony in Le Monde on 20 June 2000. At the age of twenty, she had been captured in September 1957, during the Battle of Algiers, and raped and tortured for three months. She named General Massu as the responsible of the French military at the time. Massu, 94 years old, acknowledged Ighilahriz's testimony and declared to 'Le Monde' that "Torture isn't indispensable in times of war, and one can very well do without it. When l look back on Algeria, it saddens me... One could have done things differently." To the contrary, General Bigeard (then Colonel) called her remarks a "tissue of lies", while Aussaresses justified it

=== General Aussaresses' 2000 confession and condemnation ===
General Paul Aussaresses admitted in his 2001 book, "Services spéciaux, Algérie 1955–1957", to the systematic use of torture during the war. He confessed to having himself engaged in torture and having himself illegally executed 24 Algerians, under the orders of Guy Mollet's government. He also acknowledged the assassination of lawyer Ali Boumendjel and head of FLN in Algiers, and Larbi Ben M'Hidi, which had been covered up as "suicides." For justifying the use of torture, he was condemned in court, and stripped of his army rank and his Legion of honor.

According to Aussaresses, Massu followed on a daily basis the list of "interrogated" prisoners and of "accidents" that occurred during these torture sessions. Aussaresses said that it had been directly ordered by Guy Mollet's government. He notably declared:

I have given daily accounts of my activity to my direct superior, General Massu, who informed the Chief of Staff. It would have been possible for the political or military authority to put an end to it at any moment.

He also wrote:

Concerning the use of torture, it was tolerated, if not recommended. François Mitterrand, the Minister of Justice, had, as a matter of fact, an emissary near [General] Massu in the person of judge Jean Bérard who covered us and knew exactly what was going on at night.

However, historian Pierre Vidal-Naquet said, concerning Mitterrand, who was President of France from 1981 to 1995, that "when he was Justice Minister in 1956–57, during the Algerian War, he has been not as bad as had been claimed. He had under his charge only civil justice, and Reliquet (the public prosecutor in Algiers and who was a liberal [i.e. "liberal" in French usually refers to economic liberalism]) personally told me that he never received such strict instructions against torture as that which he had had from Mitterrand."

Following Aussaresses' revelations, which proved that torture had been ordered by the highest levels of the French state hierarchy, Human Rights Watch sent a letter to President Jacques Chirac (RPR) to indict Aussaresses for war crimes, declaring that, despite past amnesties, such crimes, which may also have been crimes against humanity, may not be amnestied. The Ligue des droits de l'homme (LDH, Human Rights League) deposed a complaint against him for "apology of war crimes", as Paul Aussaresses justified the use of torture, claiming it had saved lives. He was condemned to a 7,500 Euros fine by the Tribunal de grande instance court of Paris, while Plon and Perrin, two editing houses who had published his book in which he made an apology of the use of torture, were sentenced each to a 15,000 Euros fine. The judgement was confirmed by the Court of Appeal in April 2003. The Court of Cassation rejected the intercession in December 2004. The Court of Cassation declared in its judgment that "freedom to inform, which is the basis of freedom of expression" does not lead to "accompany the exposure of facts ... with commentaries justifying acts contrary to human dignity and universally reproved", "nor to glorify its author." Aussaresses had written in his book: "torture became necessary when emergency imposed itself."

However, the Court of Cassation rejected the complaint which had been deposed against him on charges of torture, claiming they were amnestied.

=== Bigeard's attitude ===
General Marcel Bigeard, who had denied employing torture for forty years, finally also admitted that it had been used, although he claimed that he personally had not engaged in the practice. Bigeard, who qualified FLN activists as "savages", claimed torture was a "necessary evil." To the contrary, General Jacques Massu denounced it, following Aussaresses' revelations, and before his death pronounced himself in favor of an official condemnation of the use of torture during the war.

Bigeard's justification of torture has been criticized by various persons, among whom Joseph Doré, archbishop of Strasbourg, and Marc Lienhard, president of the Lutheran Church of the Augsburg Confession of Alsace and Lorraine.

In June 2000, Bigeard declared that he was based in Sidi Ferruch, known as a torture center from which many Algerians never left alive. Bigeard qualified Louisette Ighilahriz's revelations, published in Le Monde on 20 June 2000, as "lies". An ALN activist, Louisette Ighilahriz, had been tortured by General Massu. She herself called Bigeard a "liar", and criticized him for continuing to deny the use of torture 40 years later. However, since General Massu's revelations, Bigeard has now admitted the use of torture, although he denies having personally used it. He then declared: "You are striking the heart of an 84-year-old man." Bigeard also recognized that Larbi Ben M’Hidi had been assassinated, and his death disguised as a "suicide".

=== Jean-Marie Le Pen ===
Jean-Marie Le Pen, former leader of the far-right National Front party and a lieutenant during the war, attacked Le Monde and former Prime minister Michel Rocard on charges of defamation after the newspaper accused him of having engaged in torture. However, he lost his trial, with the French justice declaring Le Monde's investigations as legitimate and credible, though Le Pen appealed. Le Pen continued to deny the use of torture, claiming there had been only "interrogation sessions". Le Monde produced in May 2003 the dagger he allegedly used to commit war crimes as court evidence. This affair ended in 2000 when the "Cour de cassation" (French supreme jurisdiction) concluded that it was legitimate to publish these assertions. However, because of the amnesty and the prescription, there can be no criminal proceedings against Le Pen for the crimes he is alleged to have committed in Algeria. In 1995, Le Pen unsuccessfully sued Jean Dufour, regional counselor of the Provence-Alpes-Côte d'Azur (French Communist Party) for the same reason. Pierre Vidal-Naquet in "Torture; Cancer of Democracy" alleges that, after being refused a drink at an already closed bar in Algiers, Le Pen had the bartender tortured to death.

== See also ==
- Sétif and Guelma massacre
- Torture during the First Indochina War
- Torture during the Gaza war
- Paris massacre of 1961
- Jacques Massu, La vraie bataille d'Alger, 1972.
- Jean Lartéguy, Les centurions, 1959, and Les prétoriens, 1961.
- Maurice Audin
- The Battle of Algiers, Italian film which describes very well, according to Paul Aussaresses himself, the use of torture in Algeria
- French colonial empire
- Operation Condor and "Dirty War"
- Human rights in France

== Bibliography ==
=== French-language studies ===
- Alleg, Henri Mémoire algérienne : Souvenirs de luttes et d'espérances, Paris, Stock, 2005, 407 pp., ISBN 2-234-05818-X.
- Bousselham, Hamid, "Torturés par Le Pen" sur Rebellyon.info de édité par Rahma co-édition Rahma-Anep.
- Branche, Raphaëlle "La torture et l'armée pendant la guerre d'Algérie", Gallimard septembre 2001.
- Harbi, Mohamed and Stora, Benjamin, La Guerre d'Algérie, 1954–2004. La fin de l'amnésie Paris, Laffont, 2004 ISBN 2-221-10024-7. Re-edition Pluriel ISBN 2-01-279279-0 ISBN 978-2-01-279279-1 (includes abstract by Raphaëlle Branche, "La torture pendant la guerre", p. 381–402)
- Le Cour Grandmaison, Olivier (2005). Coloniser, Exterminer: Sur la guerre et l'État colonial, Fayard, p. 161. ISBN 978-2-213-62316-0
- Rey, Benoist (1999). Les égorgeurs : Guerre d'Algérie, chronique d'un appelé, 1959–1960 (preface by Mato-Topé). Collection Pages libres (in French) (21e éd. ed.). Paris: Éd. du Monde libertaire. ISBN 2-903013-61-6. ISSN 1158-8438.
- Robin, Marie-Monique, Escadrons de la mort, l'école française, 453 pages. La Découverte (15 September 2004). Collection: Cahiers libres. (ISBN 2-7071-4163-1) Los Escuadrones De La Muerte/ the Death Squadron, 539 pages. Sudamericana; Édition : Translatio (October 2005). (ISBN 950-07-2684-X) "Escadrons de la mort, l’école française" présentation sur le site de la LDH de Toulon.
- Vidal-Naquet, Pierre, L'Affaire Audin (1957); La Torture dans la République : essai d'histoire et de politique contemporaine (1954–1962), Minuit, 1972.

=== Abstracts and collective works ===
==== French-language ====
- Branche, Raphaëlle. "Justice et torture à Alger en 1957 : apports et limites d'un document" (en collaboration avec Sylvie Thénault) in Dominique Borne, Jean-Louis Nembrini et Jean-Pierre Rioux (dir.), Apprendre et enseigner la guerre d'Algérie et le Maghreb contemporain, Actes de l'université d'été de l'Education Nationale, CRDP de Versailles, 2002, p. 71–88. Available on-line.
  - "La seconde commission de sauvegarde des droits et libertés individuels" in AFHJ, in La justice en Algérie 1830–1962, Paris, La Documentation Française, 2005, 366 p., p. 237–246.
  - "Comment rétablir de la norme en temps d'exception. L’IGCI/CICDA pendant la guerre d'Algérie" in Laurent Feller (dir.), Contrôler les agents du pouvoir, Limoges, PULIM, 2004, p. 299–310.
  - "La torture, l'armée et la République" in Université de tous les savoirs, dir. Yves Michaud, La guerre d'Algérie (1954–1962), Paris, Odile Jacob, 2004, p. 87–108 (Audio Conference)
  - "Faire l'histoire de la violence d'État" in Sébastien Laurent (dir.), Archives "secrètes", secrets d'archives. Historiens et archivistes face aux archives sensibles, Paris, CNRS éditions, 2003, 288 p.
  - "La torture pendant la guerre d'Algérie : un crime contre l'humanité ?" in Jean-Paul Jean and Denis Salas (dir.), Barbie, Touvier, Papon... Des procès pour mémoire, Autrement, 2002, p. 136–143.
  - Branche, Raphaëlle. "Des viols pendant la guerre d'Algérie", Vingtième Siècle. Revue d'histoire, n°75, juillet-septembre 2002, p. 123–132.
  - "La lutte contre le terrorisme urbain" in Jean-Charles Jauffret et Maurice Vaïsse (dir.), Militaires et guérilla dans la guerre d'Algérie, Bruxelles, Complexe, 2001, 561 p., p. 469–487.
  - "La commission de sauvegarde des droits et libertés individuels pendant la guerre d'Algérie. Chronique d'un échec annoncé ?", Vingtième Siècle. Revue d'histoire, n°62, avril-juin 1999, p. 14–29.

==== Other languages ====
- Aussaresses, General Paul. The Battle of the Casbah: Terrorism and Counter-Terrorism in Algeria, 1955–1957. (New York: Enigma Books, 2010) ISBN 978-1-929631-30-8.
- Branche, Raphaëlle. "Torture and the border of humanity" (in collaboration with Françoise Sironi), International Social Science Journal, n°174, December 2002, p. 539–548.
  - "Campaign against torture" and "Algerian War" in John Merriman and Jay Winter (eds.), Encyclopedy of Europe, 1914–2004, New York, Charles Scribner's Sons.
  - "French Soldiers in Algeria, 1954–1962 : Denouncing Torture during the War and Forty Years Later", international symposium organized by the University of Maryland and the Hebrew University of Jerusalem on "Soldier Testimony and Human Rights", Jerusalem, February 2004.
  - "The State, Historians and Memories: The Algerian War in France, 1992–2002", conference at the international symposium "Contemporary Historians and the Public Use of History", Södertörn University College, Stockholm, August 2002 (published in 2006)
  - "The violations of the law during the French-Algerian War" in Adam Jones (eds), Genocide, War Crimes, and the West, Zed Books, 2004, p. 134–145 (also available in German)
- Lazreg, Marnia, Torture and the Twilight of Empire, Princeton: Princeton University Press, 2007 (ISBN 978-0-691-13135-1).
- Rejali, Darius, Torture and Democracy, Princeton: Princeton University Press, 2007.

=== Contemporary works ===
- Alleg, Henri, La Question, Lausanne: E. La Cité, 1958; Paris: Éditions de Minuit, 1961 (ISBN 2-7073-0175-2).
- Trinquier, Roger. Modern Warfare: A French View of Counterinsurgency (1961).
- Vian, Boris, The Deserter (translated in many languages; censored during the war)

== Sources ==
- THE FRENCH ARMY AND TORTURE DURING THE ALGERIAN WAR (1954–1962), Raphaëlle Branche, Université de Rennes, 18 November 2004
- COLONIALISM THROUGH THE SCHOOL BOOKS – The hidden history of the Algerian war, Le Monde diplomatique, April 2001 (in English and French)
- Torture in Algeria. The report that was to change everything, ICRC, 19 August 2005
- Video Ina - Archives pour tous, Archived from the original on 6 Oct 2022, film testimony by Paul Teitgen, Jacques Duquesne and Hélie Denoix de Saint Marc on the INA archive website
