= Paul Teitgen =

Résistant and political prisoner during the Second World War

Paul Teitgen (6 February 1919 – 13 October 1991) was a résistant and political prisoner during the Second World War. Later, he was the Police Prefect of Algiers during the Algerian War, where he was notable for his opposition to the French military's use of torture.

== Early life ==
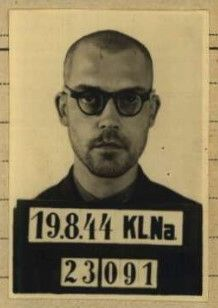
Teitgen's detention photo (1944)

Teitgen was born in Colombe-lès-Vesoul, son of Henri (an employee of L'Impartial before the war, after he became a lawyer), brother to Pierre Henri Teitgen and one of seven, growing up in Nancy.

== World War II ==
During the war Teitgen, his father and brother all joined the French Resistance and were deported by the Nazis. He was imprisoned in Dachau Concentration Camp and tortured nine times.

== Career ==
After the war he joined the first class of the École nationale d'administration. After graduation he became sub-Prefect and then in 1955 secretary general of the Marne.

In August 1956, Teitgen was appointed Police Perfect of Algiers. In November 1956 he refused to condone the torture of Fernand Iveton who had planted a bomb at the gasworks where he worked and refused to reveal the location of a second bomb.

In December 1956 Teitgen received a call from General Jacques Faure proposing a military takeover of Algeria. Teitgen reported the exchange to the Governor-General of Algeria Robert Lacoste and then to Minister of Defence Maurice Bourgès-Maunoury who was dismissive of the warning. Teitgen then reported it to Prime Minister Guy Mollet and Faure was recalled to France and arrested. General Paul Aussaresses later stated that Teitgen's actions against Faure were widely resented by the military.

Teitgen was reported to be ambivalent towards the military, commanded by General Jacques Massu, being given full police powers over Algiers during the Battle of Algiers as he regarded the Algiers Police as being corrupt and under the control of the Corsican Mafia.

On 29 March 1957, Teitgen handed his resignation to Lacoste after seeing signs of torture on prisoners being held at the military holding camps at Béni Messous and Paul Cazelle. Lacoste asked Teitgen to remain at his post in order to try to mitigate the torture and Teitgen agreed and in April he helped form the "Safeguard Committee of Individual Rights and Liberties" to investigate and moderate the torture. He eventually resigned over the torture issue in September, leaving his post on 8 October 1957. Teitgen recorded that he had approved over 24,000 assignations a residence which gave the military custody of suspects and of those 3,024 had disappeared. Paul Aussaresses asserts that Teitgen would have known that many of those detained would be tortured but possibly was unaware that many would also be executed.

His resignation, (as well as that of General de Bollardière, the only senior Army officer to do so) is notable for being one of the very few instances of senior French officers opposing torture during the war.

In early May 1958 he travelled to Paris to warn of the impending military putsch in Algiers. On his return to Algiers he was threatened and forced to leave Algeria on 19 May. Teitgen and his family were then sent to Brazil staying there for six months before returning to France. In 1960 he became a member of the Conseil d'État.

In September 1960 Teitgen appeared as a witness in the trial of Francis Jeanson. In his deposition Teitgen said that during the Battle of Algiers he had sheltered three Muslim nurses in his home for a month and a half protecting them from both the FLN and the French military. Teitgen advised that torture was the reason for his resignation and that he been aware of some disappearances.

Teitgen later remarked "All right, Massu won the Battle of Algiers; but that meant losing the war."

== Later life and death ==
He died on 13 October 1991 and was buried in his home town of Colombe-lès-Vesoul.
