= Moghazni =

Algerian War French paramilitary

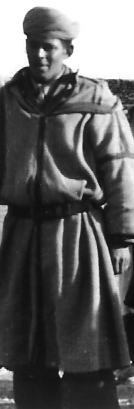
Moghazni in 1960

Moghaznis (Arabic: مخزني), literally «the Makhzen ») were auxiliaries to the Sections Administratives Spécialisées (Specialized Administrative Sections or SAS) and the Sections Administratives Urbaines (Urban Administrative Sections) of the French army during the Algerian War.

Numbering 20,000, they were responsible for protecting SAS whose maximum number was 688 at the end of 1958.

== Organization ==
The Moghazni were organized into 30 to 40 men magzhen who reported to the district SAS officers. Many were mounted on horses who were more capable in rural Algeria. Moghazni wore standard French army fatigues with a red M1946 Bonnet de police.

== Personnel ==
There were 3,500 locally recruited Moghazni in 1956, 20,000 in 1961, 15,000 in the spring of 1962.

== Bibliography ==
- Nicolas d'Andoque, Guerre et paix en Algérie. L'épopée silencieuse des SAS : 1955–1962, (War and peace in Algeria. The silent epic of the SAS: 1955–1962), Paris: Société de production littéraire (Society of literary production), 1977
- Gregor Mathias, Les Sections Administratives Spéciales en Algérie, entre idéal et réalité, (The Special Administrative Sections in Algeria, Between Ideal and Reality) 1955–1962. Paris, Harmattan/Institut d’Etudes Africaines d’Aix en Provence, 1998, 256 p

== See also ==
- Harkis
- Goumiers
- Regulares
- Razakars
