= Regroupement camps in the Algerian War =

French concentration camps during the Algerian War

Algerian villagers being deported under the control of the French army.

Between 1957 and 1961, the French army forcibly displaced between two and three million Algerians from their homes during the Algerian War. By late 1960, over 1,150 regroupment (regrouping; gathering) camps had been created.They held more than 2.1 million civilians, nearly a quarter of Algeria's population at the time. No official death toll has been confirmed or released by the French government at the time; Historian Fabien Sacriste estimates that almost 200,000 Algerians died in these camps, and a third of them were infants less than one year old.

The French military described these operations as “regroupements,” claiming they aimed to separate civilians from National Liberation Front (FLN) fighters and bring development to rural areas. In practice, the army evacuated entire villages, demolished homes, and relocated families into zones enclosed by barbed wire. In many camps, military oversight replaced civilian structures, and movement was tightly controlled. Consequently, these camps were instruments of military control.

In 1959, Michel Rocard, then an inspector of finance, wrote an internal report to Paul Delouvrier, delegate general of the government in Algeria, denouncing the inhumane conditions in these camps. He described scenes of hunger, disease, and disorientation. Later research by historians Fabien Sacriste, Malika Rahal, Sylvie Thénault, Raphaëlle Branche, Kamel Kateb, and others confirmed the patterns witnessed by Rocard and placed them within a wider strategy of counterinsurgency.

The deportation and internment of civilians, carried out under military command and accompanied by the destruction of property, fall under Article 49 of the Fourth Geneva Convention: “individual or mass forcible transfers” of protected civilians are prohibited, regardless of motive.

== Background ==
After the start of the Algerian War in 1954, the FLN had implanted itself in rural Algeria, particularly in mountainous areas such as Kabylia, Aurès, and the Nemencha range. These zones became centers of both military resistance against the French, and surveillance by the French army.

Prior to the regroupement policy, rural populations were already experiencing intense military repression. These included aerial bombardments, food blockades, destruction of livestock and crops, random arrests of civilians, and summary executions. As early as 1955, reports from the Red Cross and international journalists noted that entire villages were being razed in counterinsurgency operations.

Oppression techniques in rural areas included the use of banned chemical weapons, and incendiary weapons, such as napalm. French air force units deployed incendiary bombs in remote regions to target FLN posts and break resistance. Napalm was dropped on forests, suspected rebel zones, and even agricultural lands, causing not only massive destruction but also mass panic among the population. The extensive use of chemical weapons set the conditions for displacement.

The French army had already used strategies of regrouping civilians as part of its colonial military practice. During the Indochina War, French forces established "protected hamlets" to isolate populations from Viet Minh influence.

The French authorities claimed that the regroupement strategy was a development plan, aimed to bring education, healthcare, and infrastructure to isolated rural populations. But in practice, as many scholars have argued, it was a tool of war and control. It allowed the French army to empty contested zones, cut off rural support to the FLN, and impose surveillance on displaced civilians.

== Types of camps ==
The French army and colonial administration established seven categories of regroupment zones, each with specific administrative or military functions, and they were part of pacification zones. Functionally, the camps included four major types:

- Centre de regroupement de population CRP (Centers of grouping of the population): the most common type, and they housed civilians forcibly displaced from their villages in areas viewed as militarily sensitive where the population was conquered by the FLN. These camps were surrounded by barbed wire, located near roads, and placed under strict military surveillance, and lacked even basic infrastructure.
- Centres d’éducation et de rééducation (Centers for education and re-education): These centers were created for minors, including orphan children, considered at risk of joining the rebellion. This is the least documented type of regroupement camps.
- Centres de triage et de transit (Centers of triage and transit): These functioned as temporary holding zones for suspects arrested by French authorities before being transferred to more permanent detention centers.
- Centres d’auto-construction (Centers of auto-construction): These zones involved displaced populations constructing their own shelters, often using limited and cheap materials.

While these categories were defined administratively, their characteristics often overlapped. Camps’ conditions varied significantly depending on the region, military command, and available resources.

== Deportations and the transfer into camps ==
The transfer of civilians into regroupment camps was carried out under military command, often with no prior warning. In most cases, entire villages were emptied overnight. French soldiers arrived with orders to evacuate, giving residents only minutes or hours to gather belongings. Those who resisted were almost always shot, and in some cases beaten or arrested. Homes were burned or destroyed immediately after the evacuation, eliminating any possibility of return. Reports also indicate that looting by French soldiers was very common during the transfers, where soldiers stole the belongings of families, such as food, livestock, and jewels.

The displacement and transfer operations were justified as security measures, but in fact they were forced deportations. According to reports by the International Committee of the Red Cross, civilians were forced onto crowded military trucks, or marched for hours under armed guard, without any information about their destination or the length of their deportation.

In mountainous or remote areas, such as in Kabylia, families were forced to flee on foot. Eyewitness accounts describe crowds of civilians, including elderly people and children, marching long distances without access to water, food, or medical care. In some instances, villagers who could not walk or those who attempted to return to their homes were declared rebels and shot on sight.

Testimonies collected by historians emphasize the terror surrounding these transfers. French troops operated with almost total impunity, including random killings of civilians and overuse of physical violence. Aerial bombardments were sometimes used to terrorize rural communities in advance of evacuation to ensure compliance.

== Life inside the camps ==
Conditions inside the regroupment camps were marked by extreme misery. Most sites were established quickly, with no proper shelters. Families slept in makeshift huts, straw, sheet metal, or plastic sheets. Overcrowding was the norm: several families lived in one shelter, and sometimes families of up to 10 members shared only one room. There was no insulation against cold or heat.

Food and water were under army control, and supplies were inconsistent. Distribution was often arbitrary, which didn't meet basic needs, especially for children and the elderly. In many camps, people had to queue for hours for water, or wait days for food. The French army also limited the access of aid groups, such as the Red Cross, to the camps.

Sanitation was almost nonexistent. Outbreaks of diarrhea, fever, and respiratory infections spread quickly. Most camps had no clinics or nurses. Some doctors filed internal reports warning of high child mortality, but these remained confidential for decades.

Displacement brought major disruptions to daily life, and broke the community structure. Families were no longer able to cultivate land, access markets, or attend mosques. With traditional livelihoods disrupted, many communities became reliant on army deliveries for food and basic supplies.

== Crimes committed in the camps by the French army ==
Multiple accounts, both from Algerian survivors and internal French sources, confirm that grave abuses were committed inside the regroupment camps. These were not rare events or rogue acts, but part of a wider system of violence sustained by military authority and impunity.

Residents were often arrested without clear charges, accused of supporting the FLN. Many were never formally tried. Inside detention centers within or near the camps, people were interrogated, and torture was the norm. Survivors described electric shocks, beatings, waterboarding, and prolonged abuse.

Sexual violence, though underreported, was part of this system. Women and girls were exposed to harassment. In some testimonies, soldiers entered homes or barracks without warning. One cited case is that of Kheira Garne, a 14-year-old girl in western Algeria who was abducted, raped, and tortured repeatedly by French soldiers while held in a camp. Her case is not unique, but among the few that became documented.

Forced labor was imposed in several camps, especially those classified as camps d’auto-construction (camps of auto-construction). People were made to build their own shelters, dig latrines, or construct roads under threat. Those who refused could be denied food, beaten, or even killed. There was no pay nor compensation for this labor.

Children were also affected. In the 'reeducation centers', some were taken from families. Others were placed in separate youth camps under military or religious oversight. In some cases, they never returned. The full extent of these separations remains unclear, as records were sparse and access to these sites limited.

Doctors and local officials did report high death rates, especially among infants. Illnesses like diarrhea, pneumonia, and malnutrition spread quickly. Medical care was almost nonexistent. Red Cross missions were restricted or denied access altogether, making outside documentation nearly impossible.

Outside the camps, the French army declared wide areas of rural Algeria as zones interdites, forbidden zones. These were often forests, valleys, or hills cleared of civilians and closed off. Anyone found inside them, regardless of age or intent, was considered suspect.

Many families ventured out, looking for firewood, crops, or belongings left behind. Some never returned. According to a 1959 report from Cherchell, women gathering herbs, children tending sheep, or men checking fields were all shot on sight.

== See also ==
- Torture during the Algerian War
- Sexual violence in the Algerian War
- Chemical weapons in the Algerian War
