= Raphaëlle Branche =

French historian and teacher

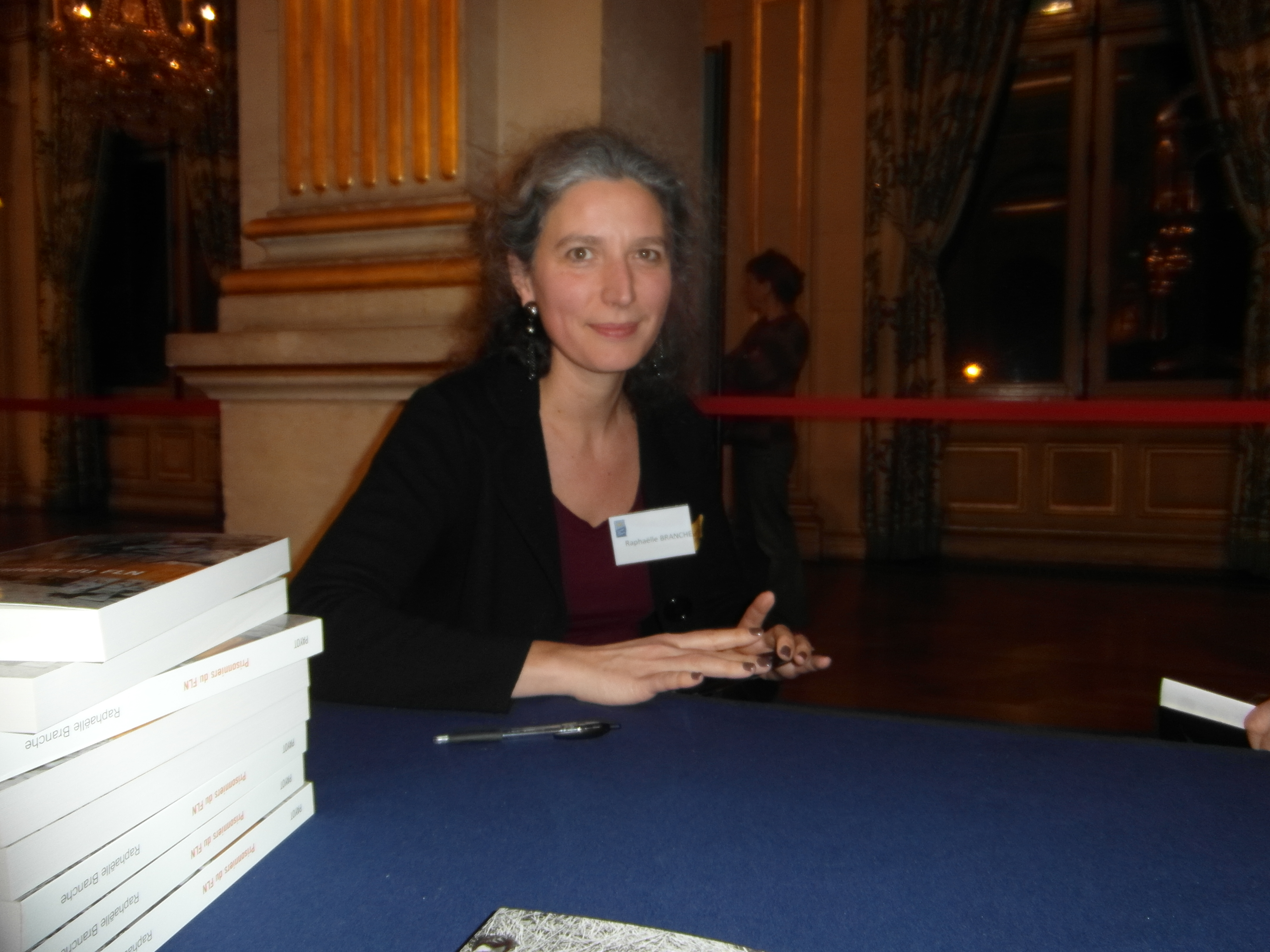
- Raphaëlle Branche in 2014
- Born: 14 July 1972 (age 52)
- Occupation: Historian

Raphaëlle Branche (born July 14, 1972) is a French historian, professor of modern history at Paris Nanterre University. She is an expert on torture in the Algerian War, and more broadly on colonial violence and colonial wars. She is a professor of contemporary history in the University of Paris and has been since the 2019 academic year.

== Life ==
In 2001 Branche published her doctoral thesis, La torture et l'armée pendant la Guerre d'Algérie. In 2014 Branche became professor at the University of Rouen. In 2019 she became professor at Paris Nanterre University.

== Works ==
- La torture et l'armée pendant la Guerre d'Algérie: 1954-1962. Paris: Gallimard, 2001.
- La Guerre d'Algérie : une histoire apaisée?. Paris: Editions du Seuil, 2005.
- (ed. with Sylvie Thénault) La France en guerre, 1954-1962: expériences métropolitaines de la guerre d'indépendance algérienne. Paris: Autremont, 2008.
- (ed. with Fabrice Virgili) Rape in wartime. New York: Palgrave Macmillan, 2013.
- (ed. with Xavier Bougarel and Cloé Drieu) Combatants of Muslim origin in European armies in the twentieth century: far from jihad. London: Bloomsbury Academic, 2017.
- Papa, qu’as-tu fait en Algérie?. La Découverte. 2020.
