= Battle of Algiers (1956–1957) =

Urban guerrilla campaign in the Algerian War

Coordinates: 36.7761°N 3.0600°E

- Part of the Algerian War
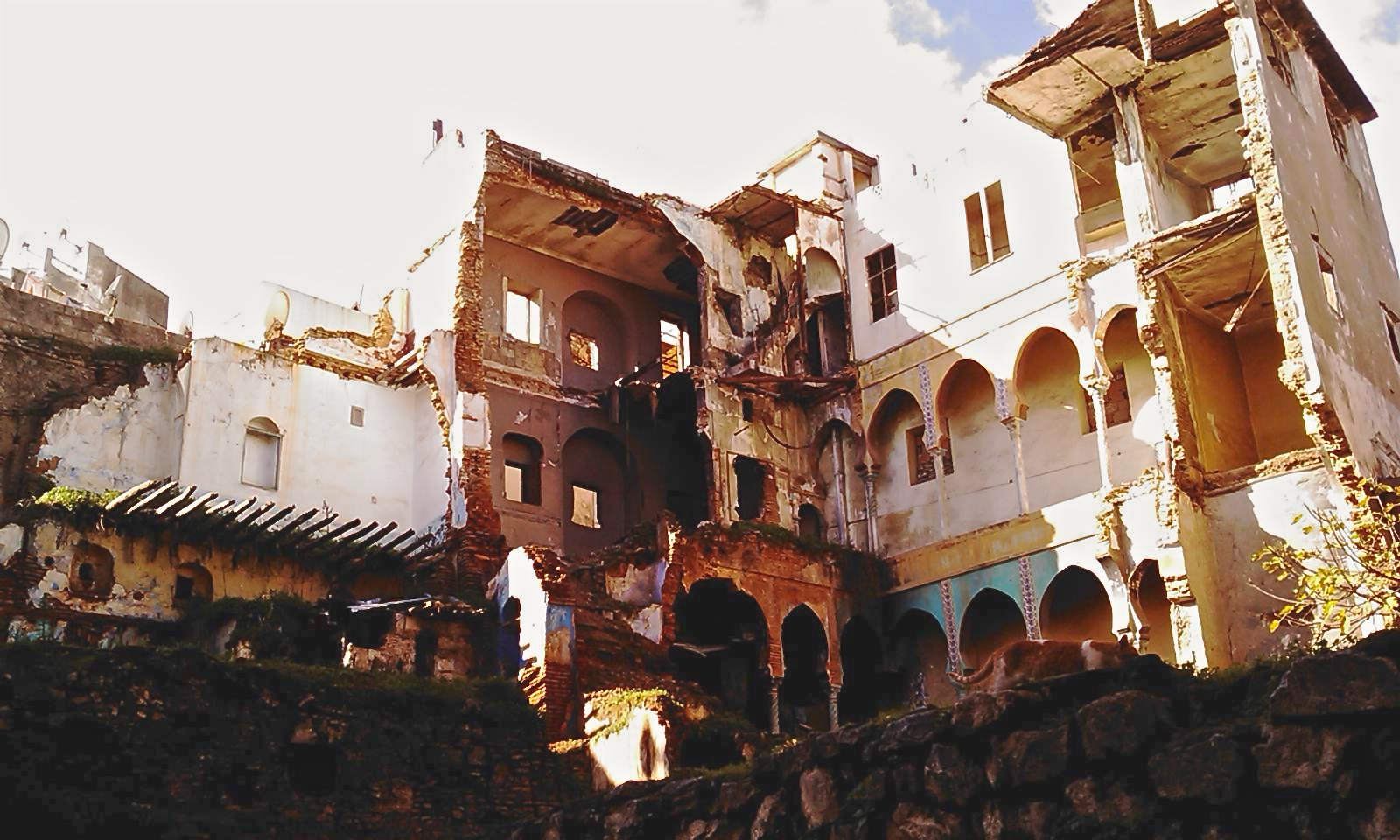
- The remains of a house in the Casbah of Algiers destroyed in the explosion that killed Ali la Pointe
Date	30 September 1956 – 24 September 1957 (11 months, 3 weeks and 4 days)
Location	Algiers, French Algeria
Result	French victory

Belligerents
FLN	French Republic; La Main Rouge

Commanders and leaders
Abane Ramdane; Krim Belkacem; Larbi Ben M'hidi (executed); Benkhedda; Saad Dahlab; Yacef Saâdi; Ali la Pointe †	Jacques Massu; Marcel Bigeard; Yves Godard; Roger Trinquier; Pierre Jeanpierre (WIA); Paul Aussaresses

Strength
5,000 militants	8,000 soldiers 1,500 policemen

Casualties and losses
3,000 killed or missing	300 killed 900 wounded

The Battle of Algiers, (Note: Arabic: معركة مدينة الجزائر; French: Bataille d'Alger) also called the great repression of Algiers, (Note: French: grande répression d’Alger) was a campaign fought during the Algerian War. It consisted of urban guerrilla warfare and terrorist attacks carried out by the National Liberation Front (FLN) against the French authorities in Algiers, and by the French authorities, army, and French terrorist organizations against the FLN.

Both sides targeted civilians throughout the battle. The conflict began with attacks by the FLN against the French forces and Pieds-Noirs (European settlers) followed by a terrorist attack on Algerian civilians in Algiers by a group of settlers, part of the terrorist group "La Main Rouge", aided by the police. Reprisals followed and the violence escalated, leading the French Governor-General to deploy the French Army in Algiers to suppress the FLN. Civilian authorities gave full powers to General Jacques Massu who, operating outside legal frameworks between January and September 1957, eliminated the FLN from Algiers. The use of torture, forced disappearances and illegal executions by the French later caused controversy in France.

== Background ==
In March 1955, Rabah Bitat, head of the FLN in Algiers, was arrested by the French. Abane Ramdane, recently freed from prison, was sent from Kabylia to take the political direction of the city in hand. In a short time, Ramdane managed to revive the FLN in Algiers. On 20 August 1955, violence broke out around Philippeville, drastically escalating the conflict. In 1956, the "Algerian question" was to be debated at the United Nations. During the summer of 1956, secret negotiations between the French and FLN took place in Belgrade and Rome. The Pied-noirs began to organise themselves into a paramilitary group under André Achiary, a former officer of the SDECE and under-prefect of Constantinois at the time of Sétif massacre.

== First phase ==
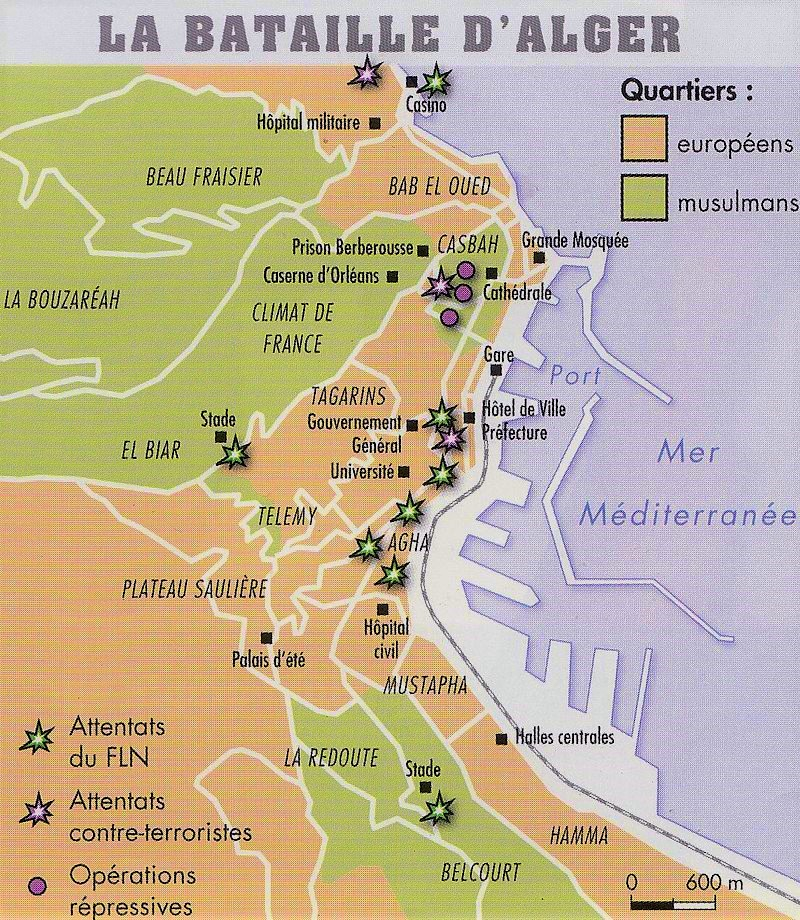
Map of Algiers showing: Muslim quarters (green), European quarters (orange) and attacks by the FLN and counterattacks

On 19 June 1956 two FLN prisoners were executed by guillotine at the Barberousse Prison. Abane Ramdane ordered immediate reprisals against the French and Yacef Saâdi, who had assumed command in Algiers following Bitat's arrest, was ordered to "shoot down any European, from 18 to 54. No women, no children, no elder." A series of random attacks in the city followed with 49 civilians shot by the FLN between 21 and 24 June.

On the night of 10 August 1956, helped by members of Robert Martel's Union française nord-africaine, Achiary planted a bomb at Thèbes Road in the Casbah targeted at the FLN responsible for the June shootings. The explosion killed 73 residents. In September at the Soummam conference, the FLN adopted a policy of indiscriminate terrorism. Larbi Ben M'Hidi and Yacef Saâdi were ordered to prepare for an offensive.

Peace talks broke down and Guy Mollet's government put an end to the policy of negotiations. Ben M'Hidi decided to extend terrorist actions to the European city as to touch more urban populations, Arab bourgeoisie in particular, and use Algiers to advertise his cause in metropolitan France and in the International community. Yacef Saâdi proceeded to establish an organisation based within the Casbah. On the evening of 30 September 1956, a trio of female FLN militants recruited by Yacef Saâdi, Djamila Bouhired, Zohra Drif and Samia Lakhdari, carried out the first series of bomb attacks on three civilian targets in European Algiers. The bombs at the Milk Bar Café on Place Bugeaud and the Cafeteria on Rue Michelet killed 3 and injured 50, while the bomb at the Air France terminus failed to explode due to a faulty timer.

On 22 October 1956, a Moroccan DC-3 plane ferrying the foreign affairs personnel of the FLN from Rabat to Tunis for a conference with President Bourguiba and the Sultan of Morocco was re-routed to Algiers. Hocine Aït Ahmed, Ahmed Ben Bella, Mohammed Boudiaf, Mohamed Khider and Mostefa Lacheraf were arrested. In December, General Raoul Salan was promoted to commander in chief of the army of Algeria. Salan was adept in the theory of counter-insurgency; he chose veterans of the First Indochina War as his lieutenants, most notably General André Dulac, Colonel Goussault (psychological operations), General Robert Allard, and Lieutenant-Colonel Roger Trinquier. On the FLN side, a decision was made in late 1956 to embark upon a sustained campaign of urban terrorism designed to show the authority of the French state did not extend to Algiers, Algeria's largest city.

Abane Ramdane believed that such a campaign would be the "Algerian Dien Bien Phu" that would force the French out of Algeria. It was decided to deliberately target pied-noir citizens as a way of breaking French power as one FLN directive put it: "A bomb causing the death of ten people and wounding fifty others is the equivalent on the psychological level to the loss of a French battalion."

On 28 December 1956, an FLN activist Ali la Pointe assassinated Amédé Froger, the Mayor of Boufarik and President of the Federation of Mayors of Algeria, outside his home. The following day, a bomb exploded in the cemetery where Froger was to be buried; enraged European civilians responded by carrying out random revenge attacks (ratonnade), killing four Muslims and injuring 50.

=== The Army takes over ===
On 7 January 1957, Governor-General Robert Lacoste summoned General Salan and General Massu, commander of the 10th Parachute Division (10e DP), and explained that, as the Algiers police force was incapable of dealing with the FLN and controlling the Pied-noirs, Massu was to be granted full responsibility for the maintenance of order in Algiers. The 5,000 man strong 10e DP had just returned from the Suez campaign. An elite unit, it was officered by many veterans of the Indochina War, including Colonels Marcel Bigeard, Roger Trinquier, Fossey-François and Yves Godard (chief of staff), all of whom were experienced in counter-insurgency and revolutionary warfare and determined to avoid another defeat. In addition to the 10e DP, Massu's forces included:

- Police (1,100 men)
- the DST (domestic intelligence agency)
- the SDECE (external intelligence agency)
- the 11th Parachute Choc Regiment (11e Choc) (1,000 men)
- the 9th Zouave Regiment (based in the Casbah)
- the 5th Chasseurs d'Afrique Regiment (350 armored cavalry troops)
- the 25th Dragoon Regiment (400 men)
- two Intervention and Reconnaissance detachments (650 men)
- 55 gendarmes
- the Compagnies républicaines de sécurité (920 men)
- the Unités territoriales (1,500 men), mostly composed of Pied-Noirs and led by Colonel Jean-Robert Thomazo

Prefect Serge Baret signed a delegation of powers to General Massu, stipulating that:

over the territory of the Algier department, responsibility for riot control is transferred, from the publication date of this decree, to the military authority that shall exercise police powers normally devoted to civilian authorities.

Massu was charged to:

institute zones where stay is regulated or forbidden; to place any person whose activity would prove dangerous to public security and order under house arrest, under surveillance or not; to regulate public meetings, shows, bars; to order declaration of weapons, ammunition and explosives, and order their surrendering or seek and confiscate them; the order and authorise perquisitions of homes by day or night; to decide on penalties imposed as reparations of damage to public and private property to anyone found to have helped the rebellion in any way.

There were no written orders from the government of Guy Mollet to use torture or engage in extrajudicial executions, but numerous Army officers have stated that they received verbal permission to use whatever means necessary to break the FLN including the use of torture and extrajudicial killings.

=== Deployment and response ===
The 10e DP deployed into Algiers the following week. The city had been divided into squares under a system known as quadrillage with each allotted to a Regimental command. The troops cordoned off each section, established checkpoints and conducted house-to-house searches throughout their areas of responsibility. A unit of the 11e Choc raided the Sûreté headquarteres and took away all files on FLN suspects and then proceeded to conduct mass arrests. On the afternoon of Saturday 26 January, female FLN operatives again planted bombs in European Algiers, the targets were the Otomatic on Rue Michelet, the Cafeteria and the Coq-Hardi brasserie. The explosions killed 4 and wounded 50 and a native Algerian was killed by Pied-Noirs in retaliation.

In late January, the FLN called an 8-day general strike across Algeria commencing on Monday 28 January. The strike appeared to be a success with most native Algerian shops remaining shuttered, workers failed to turn up and children didn't attend school. However Massu soon deployed his troops and used armored cars to pull the steel shutters off shops while army trucks rounded up workers and schoolchildren and forced them to attend their jobs and studies. Within a few days the strike had been broken. The bombings however continued and in mid-February female FLN operatives planted bombs at the Municipal Stadium and the El-Biar Stadium in Algiers killing 10 and injuring 45. After visiting Algiers, a clearly shocked defense minister Maurice Bourgès-Maunoury told General Massu after the bombings: "We must finish these people off!"

=== Battle of the Casbah ===
The Casbah fell under the control of Bigeard and his 3rd Colonial Parachute Regiment (3e RPC). While females had not previously been searched in Algiers; following the Coq Hardi explosion one of the waiters identified the bomber as a woman. Accordingly, female suspects were subsequently searched by metal detectors or physically, limiting the ability of the FLN to continue the bombing campaign from the Casbah. In February Bigeard's troops captured Yacef's bomb transporter, who under extreme interrogation gave the address of the bomb factory at 5 Impasse de la Grenade. On 19 February the 3e RPC raided the bomb factory finding 87 bombs, 70 kg of explosives, detonators and other material, Yacef's bomb-making organisation within the Casbah had been destroyed.

== Intelligence, torture and summary executions ==
Meanwhile, Godard had been mapping out the operational structure of the FLN in Algiers with his organigramme, each arrest and interrogation revealed new organisational cells. Trinquier operated an intelligence gathering network throughout the city called the Dispositif de Protection Urbaine (DPU) which divided Algiers into sectors, sub-sectors, blocks and buildings each individually numbered. For each block a trusted Muslim French Army veteran was appointed as the block-warden responsible for reporting all suspicious activities in his block. Many of these responsables would be assassinated by the FLN.

Edward Behr estimated that 30-40% of the male population of the Casbah was arrested at some point during the battle. These arrests generally took place at night so that any names revealed under interrogation could be picked up before the curfew lifted in the morning. The suspects would then be handed over to the Détachement Operationnel de Protection (DOP) for interrogation after which they would either be released or passed to a centre d'hebergement for further interrogation.

During the battle the use of torture by the French security forces became institutionalised, the techniques ranging from beatings, electroshock (the gegene), waterboarding, sexual assault and rape. The use of torture was not restricted to native Algerians: some French FLN sympathisers were also subjected to it. Maurice Audin, a Communist university professor, was arrested by the Paras on 11 June on suspicion of harboring and aiding FLN operatives; after Henri Alleg, the Communist editor of Alger républicain, was arrested by the Paras at Audin's apartment the following day he was told by Audin that he had been tortured. Audin was never seen again and it is believed that he either died while being interrogated or was summarily executed. Alleg was subjected to the gegene and waterboarding; following his release, he wrote his book La Question, which detailed his final meeting with Audin and his own experience of torture. The book was a best-seller in Europe and the United States, and 60,000 copies were sold in France before it was banned.

Massu appointed Major Paul Aussaresses to run a special interrogation unit based at the Villa des Tourelles in the Mustapha District of Algiers. High-value suspects and suspects with information relating to matters outside a para regiment's territorial sector would be passed over to Aussaresses' unit, where "torture was used as a matter of course". Following interrogation the vast majority of suspects were sent to camps, while those deemed too dangerous were driven to a remote location outside of Algiers where they were killed and buried. At the end of each night Aussaresses would write a report to Salan and Massu and Governor-General Lacoste.

On 9 February, paratroopers of the 2nd Parachute Chasseur Regiment (2e RCP) arrested a prominent young lawyer and FLN sympathiser Ali Boumendjel. After attempting suicide Boumendjel volunteered everything he knew, including his involvement in the murder of a European family. On 25 February Trinqier's intelligence sources located Ben M'hidi who was captured in his pyjamas by Paras at Rue Claude-Debussy. On 6 March it was announced that Ben M'hidi had committed suicide by hanging himself with his shirt. Bigeard had spent several days meeting with Ben M'hidi after his capture, hoping to use Ben M'hidi's rivalry with Ben Bella to undermine the FLN. Judge Bérard had suggested to Aussaresses that Ben M'hidi should be poisoned with cyanide in an apparent suicide and later in a meeting of Massu, Trinquier and Aussaresses it was decided that Ben M'hidi should not stand trial due to the reprisals that would follow his execution and so Aussaresses and men of the 1st Parachute Chasseur Regiment (1e RCP) removed him from Bigeard's custody and drove him to a farm outside Algiers where they faked his suicide by hanging.

On 23 March following a meeting between Massu, Trinquier, Fossy-Francois and Aussaresses to discuss what was to be done with Ali Boumendjel, Aussaresses went to the prison where Boumendjel was being held and ordered that he be transferred to another building, in the process he was thrown from a sixth floor skybridge to his death. Aussaresses was unapologetic regarding the actions he had undertaken during the battle, he said that "The justice system would have been paralyzed had it not been for our initiative. Many terrorists would have been freed and given the opportunity of launching other attacks..The judicial system was not suited for such drastic conditions... Summary executions were therefore an inseparable part of the tasks associated with keeping law and order."

Bigeard, first denied the practice of torture by the French army, but was obliged to retract his statement following Massu's confession and remorse. Bigeard later justified the torture in Algeria as a "necessary evil," while claiming to have never practised it himself. However, numerous witnesses attest to the contrary. Massu claimed to have seen Bigeard torturing a prisoner with electric shocks (the gegene). When he asked him what he was doing, Bigeard replied, 'we already did it in Indochina. We're not going to stop here'. Captain Robert Frequelin, intelligence officer in Bigeard's Parachute Regiment, admitted to R. F. G. Sarell of the British Consulate General in Algiers that they tortured every one of their prisoners. The only exception, he claimed, was Larbi Ben M'hidi. Paul Teitgen, secretary general of the French police in Algiers in 1957, claimed that Bigeard put the victim's feet in a basin, poured quick-setting cement in and threw the person into the sea from a helicopter on so-called "death flights".The victims were called "crevettes Bigeard", lit. Bigeard shrimps.

== Interlude and reorganisation ==
By late March 1957, the FLN organisation within Algiers had been completely broken, with most of the FLN leadership killed or underground and no bombs went off in Algiers. The 10e DP were withdrawn from the city and redeployed to engage the FLN in the Kabylia. However Yacef set about rebuilding his organisation within Algiers. In April, one of Yacef's collaborators, Djamila Bouhired was arrested by a French patrol, Yacef following her and disguised as a woman attempted to shoot her, but only succeeded in wounding her and Yacef fled back into the Casbah.

== Second phase ==
In early May, two paratroopers were shot in the street by the FLN, their comrades led by one of Trinquier's informers attacked a bath-house which was believed to be an FLN hideout, killing almost 80 Algerians. On 3 June, Yacef's forces planted bombs in street lamps at bus stops in the centre of Algiers, the explosions killed eight and wounded 90, a mix of French and Algerians. On 9 June a bomb exploded at the Casino on the outskirts of Algiers killing nine and injuring 85. Following the burial of the dead from the casino, the Pied-Noirs started a ratonnade that resulted in five Algerians dead and more than 50 injured. As a result of this upturn in violence the 10e DP was again deployed to Algiers. In July, informal negotiations took place between Yacef and Germaine Tillion to try to agree a deal whereby attacks on civilians would stop in return for the French ceasing to guillotine members of the FLN. During this period a number of FLN bombs were planted but with no civilian casualties.

== FLN defeated ==
On 26 August following intelligence gained by Godard's operatives, the 3e RPC raided a house in the Impasse Saint-Vincent where Yacef's new bomb-maker and deputy were believed to be hiding. After suffering several casualties trying to capture the two alive, both men were eventually killed. On 23 September. a courier for Yacef was arrested by Godard's men. At 5am on 24 September the 1e REP commanded by Colonel Pierre Jeanpierre sealed off Rue Caton and raided Yacef's hideout at No. 3. Yacef and Zohra Drif hid in a wall cavity, but this was soon located by the French troops. Yacef threw a grenade at the French troops but they were eager to take him alive and he and Zohra Drif eventually surrendered. Across the street at No 4, Ali La Pointe escaped the French cordon and went to another safe-house in the Casbah.

On the evening of 8 October, the 1e REP surrounded Ali La Pointe's hideout at 5 Rue de s Abderahmane. The paratroops laid charges to blow away the false partition behind which Ali and his comrades were hiding, unfortunately the explosion detonated a store of bombs destroying the house and several neighbouring buildings, killing Ali, his two comrades and 17 other Algerians in neighbouring houses. The capture of Yacef and the death of Ali la Pointe marked the defeat of the FLN in the city and the end of the Battle of Algiers.

== Aftermath ==
The battle was the first French victory of the war. The Paras and their commanders enjoyed immense popularity with the Pied-noirs and this sense of exuberance and strength would reach its zenith during the May 1958 crisis. The FLN losses are impossible to determine accurately. In addition to the publicised FLN deaths there were many who simply disappeared. Teitgen, who resigned in March 1957 (but was kept in his post by Governor-General Lacoste until October 1957) over the use of torture by French forces, calculated that over 24,000 Algerians had been arrested during the battle and by subtracting those released or still in captivity estimated that as many as 3,000 were missing. Many FLN leaders fled the city following French victory and its organisation in Algiers was dismantled.

Despite the FLN's military defeat, the battle is seen by some scholars as a strategic and diplomatic defeat for the French. The brutality of French counter-insurgency methods, especially the systematic use of torture, became widely publicized, and drew global attention to the conflict and sympathy for the Algerians. Both domestic and international opinion increasingly criticized French rule in Algeria. As details of the use of torture and summary executions became public in the years following the battle and the end of the Algerian War, the French victory and the reputations of many of the commanders became tainted by the methods used in the battle.

== In popular culture ==
- Lost Command (1966) by Mark Robson
  - Lost Command is a war film based on the experiences of French paratroopers in French Indochina and French Algeria.
- The Battle of Algiers (1966) by Gillo Pontecorvo
  - The battle of Algiers was produced in 1966 directed by Italian filmmaker Gillo Pontecorvo and written by Franco Solinas as well as Pontecorvo. It is based on events carried out by rebels during the Algerian War. It received critical acclaim worldwide, and was banned from being shown in France until 1971.
- The Question (1977) by Laurent Heynemann
  - The Question is a French film based on the atrocities that took place in Algeria. It follows a newspaper editor who is sympathetic to the Algerian cause.

== See also ==
- Indonesia-Malaysia confrontation, a similar event in the Malay Peninsula
- Torture during the Algerian War
- Boualem Rahal
- Fernand Iveton
- Ahmed Zabana
- Ali La Pointe
- Yacef Saadi
