= The Question (film) =

1977 French film by Laurent Heynemann

- La Question
- Directed by: Laurent Heynemann
- Written by: Henri Alleg; Laurent Heynemann; Claude Veillot
- Produced by: Jean-Serge Breton
- Cinematography: Alain Levent
- Music by: Antoine Duhamel
- Production companies: Z Productions, Rush Productions
- Release date: 4 May 1977 (France)
- Running time: 112 minutes

The Question (French: La Question) is a 1977 French film drama directed by Laurent Heynemann. It is an adaptation of the book La Question (1958) by Henri Alleg. It is a film that was critical of France during the Algerian War, and described methods of torture used by the French military.

== Plot ==
Henri Charlègue (Jacques Denis) is the director of Alger Démocratique (whose name is inspired by the newspaper Alger républicain), a communist daily newspaper, now banned. Along with the other members of the editorial staff, they live and meet clandestinely in Algiers, where they continue to publish their newspaper.

On January 8, 1957, General Martin (inspired by Jacques Massu), commander of the 10th Parachute Division, entered the city with 8,000 paratroopers, tasked with pacifying Algiers. He proclaimed martial law and searches and arrests followed in quick succession. On June 11, 1957, mathematician Maurice Oudinot (inspired by Maurice Audin), a supporter of the Algerian cause, is arrested. The next day, Henri Charlègue knocks on his friend Oudinot's door, unaware of his arrest and is then picked up by the paratroopers. He is taken to an interrogation center, under the command of Lieutenant Carbonneau (Jean–Pierre Sentier), where he will be tortured for several days.

The detention of Charlègue and Oudinot dragged on, their wives made numerous attempts to see them, but to no avail. During an interrogation, Oudinot died of exhaustion. His death was disguised as an escape. The interrogations ended and Charlègue was transferred to prison. It was there that, through a subterfuge, he wrote an account of his experiences since his arrest. The document was published as a book entitled La Question (The Question).

After three years of pre-trial detention, Charlègue is being tried in Rennes. On October 4, 1961, he escapes from the prison infirmary. Six months later, the March 22, 1962 French amnesty law was promulgated concerning acts committed during the Algerian War. This law made it impossible to prosecute the military personnel involved in the actions described in Charlègue's book.

== Cast ==
- Jacques Denis, as Henri Charlegue (character inspired by the journalist Henri Alleg, member of the French Communist Party)
- Nicole Garcia, as Agnès Charlègue
- Jean–Pierre Sentier, as Lieutenant Carbonneau
- Françoise Thuries, as Josette Oudinot
- Christian Rist, as Maurice Oudinot (character inspired by Maurice Audin, member of the Algerian Communist Party)

== Release ==
The Question film was banned for those under age 18 upon its release in France by the Ministry of Culture, which was a political move to restrict viewing. The French nationalist neocolonists reacted strongly during the film release. There was a bomb scare at a cinema in Paris screening the film, and the Front National (FN; now known as National Rally), the far-right political party of France, protested outside the cinema showings in Montpellier.

Director Laurent Heynemann won the Special Jury Prize at the San Sebastián International Film Festival in 1977 for The Question.

== See also ==
- Torture during the Algerian War
- Avoir 20 ans dans les Aurès, 1972 French film
