= Lakhdar Bouregaa =

Algerian military commander (1933–2020)

- Bouregaa in Military Uniform

Member of the Constituent National Assembly
- In office 25 September 1962 – 20 September 1964

Personal details
- Born: 15 March 1933 El Omaria, French Algeria
- Died: 4 November 2020 (aged 87) El Biar, Algeria
- Resting place: Sidi Yahia cemetery in Algiers
- Party: National Liberation Front (until 1963); Socialist Forces Front (from 1963)

Military service
- Allegiance: National Liberation Army
- Years of service: 1956–1964
- Rank: Commander
- Unit: Wilaya IV
- Battles/wars: Algerian War; Battle of Ouled Bouachra; Socialist Forces Front rebellion in Algeria

Lakhdar Bouregaa (Arabic: لخضر بورقعة; 15 March 1933 – 4 November 2020) was an Algerian independentist militant. He was a Commander of the National Liberation Army, serving from 1956 to 1962. He was opposed to the Oujda Group following a clash in the summer of 1962. He was a co-founder of the Socialist Forces Front in 1963, and was a key figure during the 2019–20 Algerian protests.

== Biography ==
Bouregaa was born in El Omaria on 15 March 1933. He performed his military service Mostaganem and Briançon with the Chasseurs Alpins. He was then sent to Safi in Morocco, where he escaped in March 1956 to join the National Liberation Front.

During the Algerian War, he joined the National Liberation Army after deserting the French Armed Forces. He became the Commander of the Wilaya IV unit between 1959 and 1960. He served under Commander Youcef Khatib, leader of the Wilaya IV unit.

During a political crisis in the summer of 1962, when Algeria was officially established, the Provisional Government of the Algerian Republic was defeated by the National Liberation Army and the Oujda Group, led by Houari Boumédiène and allied with Ahmed Ben Bella. The leaders of the Wilaya units attempted to regain power. In June 1963, he helped to create the Union pour la défense de la révolution socialiste, an underground party led by Krim Belkacem. Alongside Mohand Ouladj, Bouregaa acted as an intermediary between Belkacem and Hocine Aït Ahmed, the latter of which founded the Socialist Forces Front. The Socialist revolt was crushed at the beginning of 1964, shortly before the 1965 Algerian coup d'état.

Arrested on 3 July 1967, Bouregaa claimed to have been tortured until 27 August 1968, the day he was transferred to a prison in Oran. He was brought to Algiers for questioning during the following month before returning to Oran on 27 October. In July 1969, he was sentenced to 10 years for attempting to assassinate President Boumédiène and 20 years for participating in the coup attempt of Tahar Zbiri. According to him, he was betrayed by Commandant Azzedine. He spent seven years in prison, having been released in 1975. He published his memoirs on the events in 2010.

In 2019, during the 2019–Algerian protests, Bouregaa supported the movement against President Abdelaziz Bouteflika, which helped bring about Bouteflika's resignation. On 26 June, he participated in the meeting for the "pact of a democratic alternative" at the headquarters of the Rally for Culture and Democracy. After statements made against General Ahmed Gaïd Salah, who was a key figure in the Bouteflika regime and who Bouregaa accused of already choosing Bouteflika's successor, he was arrested on 30 June after a complaint by the Algerian Ministry of Defense. He was prosecuted for "contempt of body and damage to the morale of the army". TV1, Algeria's national television channel, alleged that Bouregaa had taken over the title "Mouhadjid", a statement that he and his former commanding officer, Youcef Khatib, denied. His release was demanded by protestors as a prerequisite to discussions with authorities. He was defended by Mostefa Bouchachi and Abdelghani Badi.

On 7 October, Bouregaa planned a hunger strike, but was dissuaded by his lawyers and protestors, given his age and his health. He then rejected his release from prison until each and every protestor was also released. On 22 October, he refused to answer questions by the magistrate reviewing his case, citing an illegitimate government. On 28 October, his sentence was renewed for four months. On 5 November, he was sent to Mustapha Pacha hospital, where he underwent surgery for bowel obstruction. He was officially released on 2 January 2020 along with other militants. On 12 March 2020, prosecution requested a one-year prison sentence for Bouregaa. On 11 May, he was fined 100,000 dinars for "attacking public bodies".

Lakhdar Bouregaa died of COVID-19 in El Biar on 4 November 2020, at the age of 87. He was buried the next day at Cimetière Sidi Yahia in Algiers.

== Books ==
- Témoin sur l’assassinat de la Révolution (2010)
