= Jérôme Lindon =

French publisher (1925–2001)

- Born: 9 June 1925; Paris, France
- Died: 9 April 2001 (aged 75); Paris, France
- Occupation: Publisher
- Employer: Éditions de Minuit
- Known for: Publishing Samuel Beckett and Claude Simon
- Spouse: Annette Lindon
- Children: 3

Jérôme Lindon (9 June 1925 – 9 April 2001) was a French publisher and head of publishing house Éditions de Minuit for more than fifty years.

== Early life ==
Lindon was born in Paris to a Jewish family with Polish origins. His father Raymond Lindon was a lawyer related to the influential Dreyfus, Bergson and Citroën families. During the Second World War, he spent time in hiding near Aix-en-Provence and joined the Combat resistance group as a teenager.

== Career ==
Éditions de Minuit was founded clandestinely in 1942 during the German occupation. Lindon joined in 1946 and, with family financial support, took over as director in 1948 at the age of 23. He gained early recognition by publishing Samuel Beckett's Molloy in 1951 after it had been rejected by other publishers. Lindon became a central figure of the Nouveau Roman in the 1950s, publishing Claude Simon, Nathalie Sarraute, Alain Robbe-Grillet, Michel Butor and Robert Pinget. He also discovered and worked with Marguerite Duras, publishing Moderato Cantabile in 1958.

Lindon expanded the publishing house's influence in philosophy and social thought, publishing Jacques Derrida, Gilles Deleuze, Pierre Bourdieu and the literary review Critique. He also took political risks, notably during the Algerian War, when he published works critical of French government policies.

== Later life and death ==
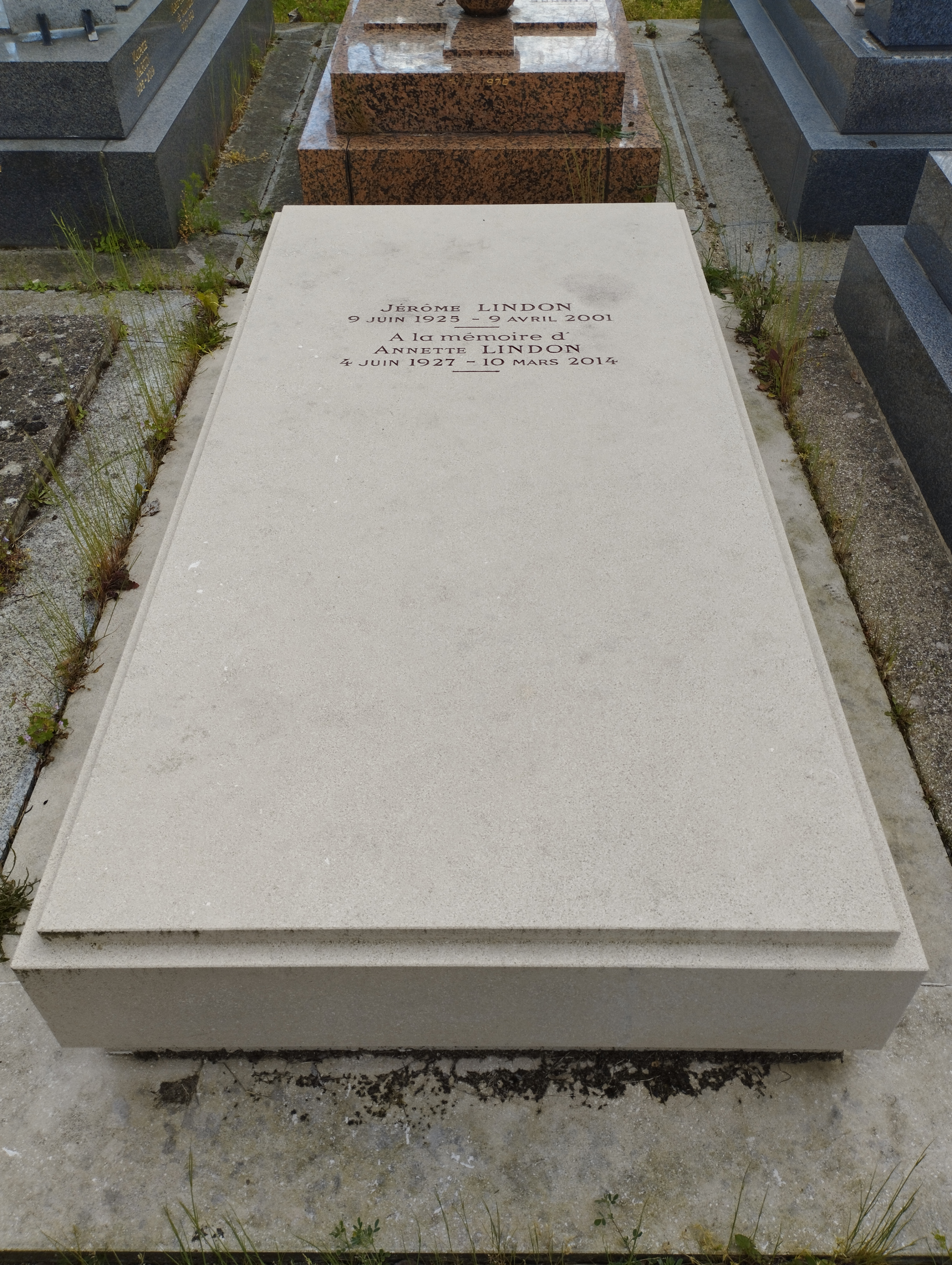
Lindon's grave at Montparnasse Cemetery.

Under Lindon, Éditions de Minuit remained a small but influential publisher, earning Prix Goncourt awards for authors such as Marguerite Duras (1984), Jean Rouaud (1990) and Jean Échenoz (1999). Lindon died of cancer on 9 April 2001 in Paris at the age of 75 and was buried at Montparnasse Cemetery near the grave of Beckett. Tributes were paid by President Jacques Chirac, Prime Minister Lionel Jospin, and leading writers and publishers. He was succeeded at Éditions de Minuit by his daughter, Irène Lindon.
