= Irène Lindon =

French publisher (1949–2025)

- Born: 5 April 1949; Paris, France
- Died: 7 December 2025 (aged 76); Paris, France
- Education: University of Paris (BPhil)
- Occupation: Publisher

Irène Lindon (French: [iʁɛn lɛ̃dɔ̃]; 5 April 1949 – 7 December 2025) was a French publisher.

After her studies in philosophy at the University of Paris, she began working for Les Éditions de Minuit, which was directed by her father, Jérôme Lindon. Following her father's death in 2001, she took over at the helm of the publisher, bringing along writers such as Vincent Almendros, Julia Deck, and Pauline Delabroy-Allard. She retired in 2021 and was succeeded by Thomas Simonnet.

Lindon died in Paris on 7 December 2025 at the age of 76.
