= Maurice Audin =

French mathematician and activist

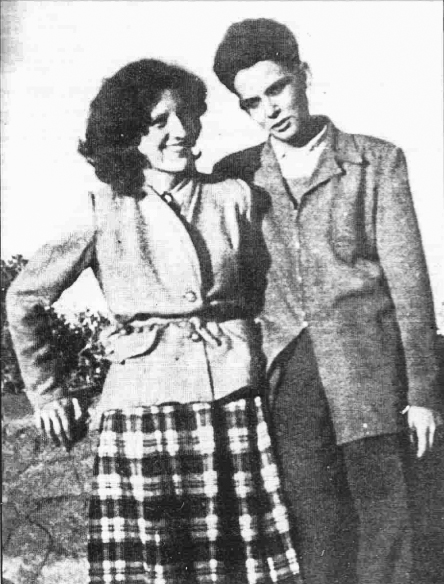
- Maurice and Josette Audin
- Born: 14 February 1932; Béja, Tunisia
- Died: c. 21 June 1957 (aged 25)
- Citizenship: French
- Education: University of Algiers
- Children: Michèle Audin
- Scientific career
- Thesis: On linear equations in a vector space (1957)
- Doctoral advisor: René de Possel

Maurice Audin (14 February 1932 – c. 21 June 1957) was a renowned French mathematics assistant at the University of Algiers, a member of the Algerian Communist Party and an activist in the anticolonialist cause, who died under torture by the French state during the Battle of Algiers.

In the centre of Algiers, beside the university, the intersection of streets bearing the names of several other heroes of the Algerian Revolution is called the Place Maurice-Audin. He is also memorialized by the Maurice Audin Prize, sponsored by the Société de Mathématiques Appliquées et Industrielles, the Société Mathématique de France, and others, and granted biennially to an Algerian mathematician working in Algeria and a French mathematician working in France.

== Family and childhood ==
He is the son of Louis Audin (1900–1977) and Alphonsine Fort (1902–1989), who married in 1923 in Koléa (Algeria); they both came from modest families, he from Lyon workers, she from peasants from the Mitidja. When Maurice was born, his father was commander of the gendarmerie brigade in Béja, in the French protectorate of Tunisia. Later, Louis Audin was assigned to metropolitan France, then he passed a competitive examination and became a postman in Algiers.

== Academic studies and career ==
Son of a soldier, Maurice Audin became an Enfant de troupe and, in 1942, entered the sixth grade at the preparatory military school of Hammam Righa. Then, in 1946, he was admitted to the Autun School.In 1948, giving up a career as an officer, he returned to the elementary mathematics class in Algiers (at the Gautier school).

He studied mathematics at the University of Algiers, obtaining his degree in June 1953, then a diploma of higher education in July. In February 1953, he was recruited as assistant to Professor René de Possel, a post he saved in 1954. He also worked on a thesis on “linear equations in a vector space” as part of a state doctorate from mathematics.

In January 1953, he married Josette Sempé (1931-2019); they had three children: Michèle (1954—2025), Louis (1955—2006) and Pierre (1957-2023).

== Algerian War ==
Maurice and Josette Audin were part of the anti-colonialist minority of the French in Algeria, whose desire is the independence of Algeria, which is also the position of the Algerian Communist Party. The latter was banned on 13 September 1955 and became an underground organization, negotiating with the FLN.

The Audin family took part in certain illegal operations: in September 1956, Maurice together with his sister (Charlye, born in 1925) and his brother-in-law (Christian Buono), organized the clandestine exfiltration abroad of Larbi Bouhali, first secretary of PCA.

In January 1957, following the numerous attacks perpetrated against the population by the FLN, the so-called “Battle of Algiers” operation was launched, for which General Massu's 10th parachute division held police powers in the area of Algiers. This unit engaged in massive torture and summary executions. Paul Teitgen notes 3,024 disappearances in one year in the five regions of the Algiers. Also General Massu put forward an assessment of the losses of the Autonomous Zone of Algiers in nine months of "less than a thousand men, and very probably the relatively low number of three hundred killed”.

== Audin affair ==
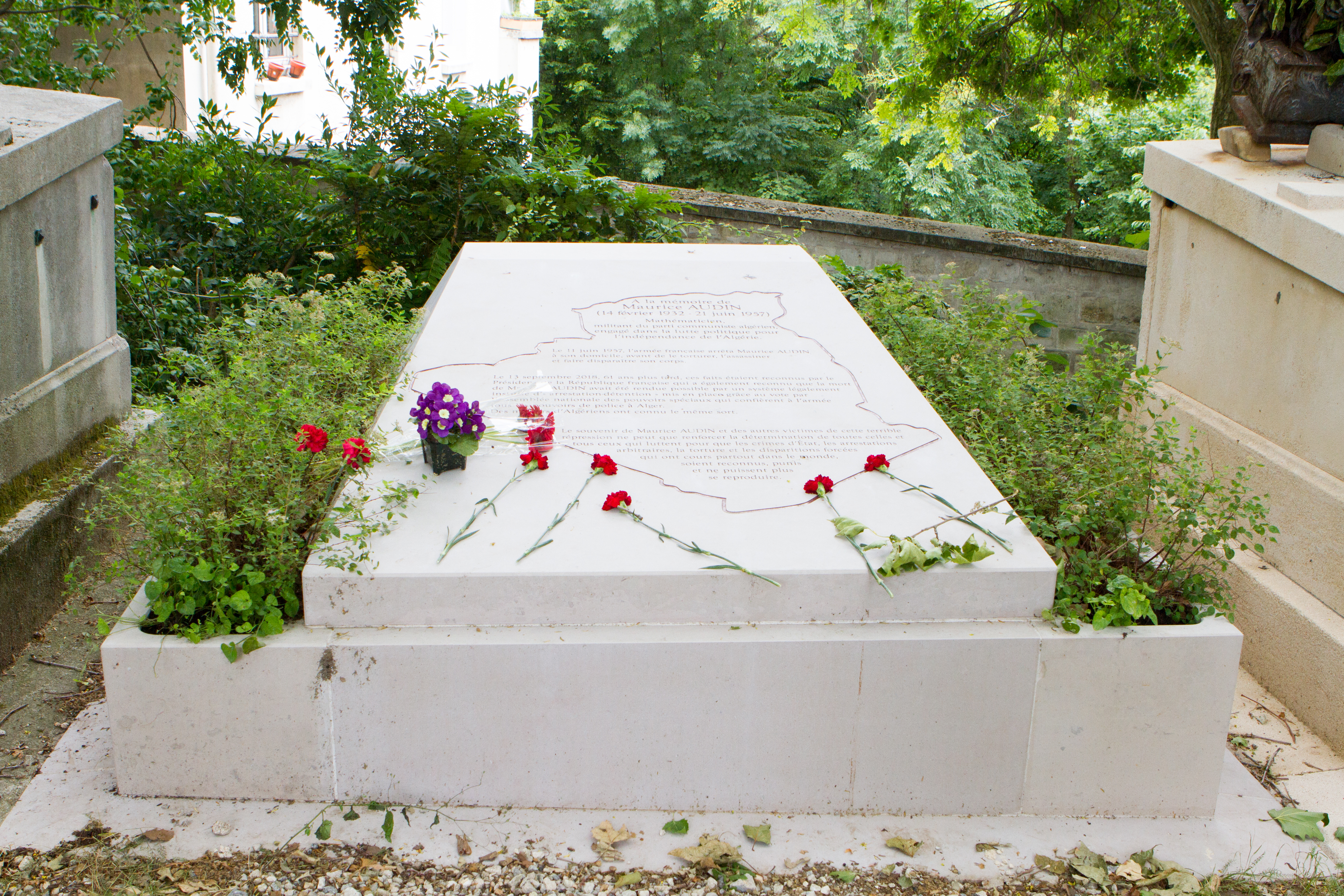
Cenotaph at the Père Lachaise Cemetery.

During the Battle of Algiers, Maurice Audin was arrested at his home on 11 June 1957 by Captain Devis, Lieutenant Philippe Erulin and several soldiers of the 1er régiment de chasseurs parachutistes (1^{e} RCP) of the French Army. He was taken to the Villa Susini in the fashionable neighborhood of El Biar for interrogation.

A trap was installed in the apartment of the Audin family and Henri Alleg, the former editor of the Alger républicain, was arrested there the next day.

Doctor Georges Hadjadj later admitted that, under torture, he had given Audin's name to men working for Paul Aussaresses, following threats that his wife would be raped.

Audin was last seen alive by Henri Alleg, one day after his arrest. Alleg had just been arrested, and the paratroopers attempted to intimidate him by showing Audin, who had been tortured and was confused. Pressed to tell Alleg how torture would feel, he said "it is tough, Henri" (c'est dur, Henri). Alleg described the events in La Question; he also mentioned later hearing a prisoner dragged away and gunshots, that he assumed were Audin's summary execution.

Audin's wife and their three children never received any further information about him. According to Pierre Vidal-Naquet, who wrote in May 1958, in the first edition of L'affaire Audin, that escape was impossible, Maurice Audin died under torture on 21 June 1957, at the hands of Lieutenant André Charbonnier (a graduate of Saint-Cyr who was nicknamed "the doctor" because he liked to use a scalpel on his victims), under the orders of the General Jacques Massu. According to the French Army, Maurice Audin tried to escape by jumping from a jeep during a transfer. However, in November 1960, Charbonnier told Vidal-Naquet that he had strangled Audin and buried the body in Fort l’Empereur in El Biar.

By July 1957, some newspapers started to discuss "the Audin affair" and, on 2 December 1957, the defence in absentia of his doctoral thesis, On linear equations in a vector space, chaired by Laurent Schwartz, aroused indignation among certain academics against the situation in Algeria.

"Audin committees" were created to publicise the issue and arouse public opinion against the practice of torture in Algeria.

A judicial inquiry was initiated following a complaint from his wife. At the request of the lawyers for Madame Josette Audin, the case was transferred in Rennes in April 1959; it lasted until April 1962 when it was closed for lack of evidence. Moreover, on 22 March 1962 an amnesty had been decreed for "activities within the framework of the operations for the enforcement of law and order directed against the Algerian insurrection".

When the case was closed, Madame Audin's lawyers appealed to the supreme court of appeal. Their appeal was rejected in 1966. The body of Maurice Audin not having been found, a death certificate was issued by a court in Algiers on 1 June 1963, a judgment which was recognized in France on 27 May 1966.

In 2001, Madame Audin issued a new complaint, calling her husband's death a crime against humanity.

In June 2007, fifty years after her husband's disappearance, Madame Audin wrote to Nicolas Sarkozy, the then newly elected French president, asking him that the mystery of her husband's disappearance be cleared up and that France assume its responsibility in the affair.

In January 2009, Michèle Audin, the daughter of Maurice Audin, herself a mathematician, publicly declined the French Legion d'Honneur, which had been awarded for her work. As a motivation for her refusal, she cited the lack of response from the French government to her mother's letter.

In September 2018, president Emmanuel Macron admitted that Maurice Audin died under torture by French government in Algeria.

== See also ==
- Torture during the Algerian War
- Censorship in France
