= Georgette Cottin-Euziol =

French Algerian architect (1926–2004)

- Born: Georgette Cottin; 7 May 1926; El Affroun, Algeria
- Died: 11 April 2004 (77 years old); Antibes, France
- Education: l'Ecole de Beaux-Arts de Paris
- Occupation: Architect

Georgette Cottin-Euziol (7 May 1926 – 11 April 2004) was a French Algerian architect, one of the first women architects in both countries.

== Early life ==
Georgette Cottin was born on 7 May 1926 at El Affroun in Algeria, daughter of Céline Rosalie Lecucq, a teacher and Gabriel Louis Cottin, an engineer.

== Education ==
During World War Two, whilst a student at l’École des beaux-arts d’Alger she took part in Resistance actions against the Vichy regime in Algiers. She met Henri Alleg during this time, and served as an intermediary with the leaders of the Jeunesses Communistes, supplying a typewriter and roneo saved from the headquarters of the Youth Hostels of Algiers which made it possible to publish a few issues of the Jeune Garde newspaper. She joined the Algerian section of the French Communist Party at the age of 17.

Following her baccalaureate, she enrolled at the l'École spéciale d’architecture in Paris to prepare for the entrance exam to the École des Beaux-Arts in Paris, which she entered on 15 March 1948 and graduated on 28 November 1956. During her degree, she spent time the workshops of architects and urbanists Georges Gromort, Louis Arretche and Pierre Vivien. She won a number of architecture prizes while at university.

== Career ==
She began her career as an architect in Algeria, returning there in 1956. She had to leave the country temporarily in 1961 because of her political stance and activism in favour of Algerian independence from France.

Following independence in 1962, she obtained Algerian nationality in 1964. Between 1956 and 1978, she worked in the Ain and Alpes-Maritimes regions of France, as well as designing a number of buildings in Algeria (including four high schools, a university library, housing, sub-prefectures). She left Algeria for good in 1978, having been targeted by Algerian anti-communists, and settled with her husband, the artist Claude Euziol, in Juan-les-Pins. From 1991, she worked in Russia.

She produced work in Algeria, France and Russia.

Cottin-Euziol deposited her archives with the Archives Départementales des Bouches-du-Rhône (fonds 138J).

Georgette Cottin-Euziol died in Antibes on 11 April 2004 age 77.

== Works ==
Cottin-Euziol's works included

- Préfecture de Tizi-Ouzou
- Reconstruction of the university library of Algiers, to replace the one destroyed by the attack of 7 June 1962 ()
- Housing projects in the suburbs of Algiers: Le Ruisseau, Kouba, Bouzaréah
- Unrealised projects for the reconstruction of Grozny
- Municipal swimming pool in Breil-sur-Roya
- Gendarmerie in Monaco
