= La Question =

1958 book about torture during the Algerian War

The Question
- Author: Henri Alleg
- Original title: La Question
- Translator: John Calder
- Language: French
- Subject: Torture during the Algerian War
- Genre: Essay
- Publisher: Paris: Éditions de Minuit; New York: George Braziller
- Publication date: 1958
- English publication date: 1958
- Pages: 112
- ISBN: 2-7073-0175-2
- OCLC: 4796436

La Question (French for "The question") is a book by Henri Alleg, published in 1958. It is famous for precisely describing the methods of torture used by French paratroopers during the Algerian War from the point of view of a victim. La Question was censored in France after selling 60,000 copies in two weeks.

== Author ==
Henri Alleg, a journalist, was formerly editor of the newspaper Alger Républicain, who went underground when its publication was banned. The resulting interrogation aimed at identifying the people who had supported him, and whom Alleg was determined to protect.

He wrote the autobiographical account in the Barberousse prison of Algiers. He managed to smuggle out the pages with the help of his lawyers.

== Subject ==
The book is a chronological account of the author's imprisonment and ordeals in El-Biar and then Lodi camps. La Question opens with the statement: "By attacking corrupt Frenchmen, it is France that I am defending". (En attaquant les Français corrompus, c’est la France que je défends.) La Question then narrates Alleg's arrest on 12 June 1957 by paratroopers of Jacques Massu's 10e Division Parachutiste. Alleg was visiting Maurice Audin, who had been arrested the day before and whose apartment the paratroopers had turned into a trap.

Alleg was detained at El-Biar, where he was tortured. The paratroopers first attempted to intimidate him by bringing in Audin, who had already been tortured the day before. He told Alleg that "it's tough, Henri" (c'est dur, Henri). Alleg writes that he did not know he was seeing his friend for the last time. Nevertheless, Alleg refused to talk.

Alleg notably sustained water torture which he describes in the following account of what is now known as waterboarding

...they picked up the plank to which I was still attached and carried me into the kitchen. ... fixed a rubber tube to the metal tap which shone just above my face. He wrapped my head in a rag... When everything was ready, he said to me: 'When you want to talk, all you have to do is move your fingers.' And he turned on the tap. The rag was soaked rapidly. Water flowed everywhere: in my mouth, in my nose, all over my face. But for a while I could still breathe in some small gulps of air. I tried, by contracting my throat, to take in as little water as possible and to resist suffocation by keeping air in my lungs for as long as I could. But I couldn’t hold on for more than a few moments. I had the impression of drowning, and a terrible agony, that of death itself, took possession of me. In spite of myself, all the muscles of my body struggled uselessly to save me from suffocation. In spite of myself, the fingers of both my hands shook uncontrollably. ‘That's it! He's going to talk,’ said a voice.

He suffered torture by electricity, and was threatened with summary execution. Alleg describes in precise details the two types of hand generators (the so-called "gégène", in Army inventory to power radio communication equipment) used for this purpose and their effect on the body.

I felt a difference in quality. Instead of sharp and quick bites that seemed to rip my body apart, it was now a larger pain that sank more deeply into all my muscles and twisted them for longer

After physical duress and psychological pressure proved ineffective, Alleg was injected with pentothal, which also failed to make him talk.

Alleg describes hearing cries from other detainees, notably voices of a woman who he thought was his wife. He also reports hearing what he thought was Audin's execution.

After all efforts to make him talk failed, Alleg was first threatened with execution, and did believe he would be executed. Actually, an official attempted to exchange his return to civil justice against signing a testimony of good treatment by the paratroopers; Alleg refused to comply, and was eventually returned to civil justice without condition.

== Redaction, publication and censorship ==
Alleg was transferred to Lodi camp for one month, and later to the civil prison of Barberousse, where he was returned to the regular legal circuits. There, he secretly redacted the text of La Question, which he transmitted through his lawyers, bit by bit.

La Question was published on 18 February 1958 by the Éditions de Minuit, with a preface by Jean-Paul Sartre; Several newspapers which reported its publication had their issues confiscated by the police, upon a request by the military tribunal of Paris, and the book itself was censored on 27 March, after selling 60,000 copies. The motive invoked was "contribution to an endeavour to demoralise the Army, with the aim to hinder National Defence."

Two weeks later, Nils Andersson published it again at the Éditions de la Cité in Lausanne, Switzerland.

Through articles pertaining to or citing the book, the memoir itself became a "near bestseller and a subject of lively debate" in France. The French government also seized an article published in L’Express in which Jean-Paul Sartre outlined the implications of Alleg's book for the French nation. Still, the essay was circulated secretly to become the preface to the book's English translation.

The French government officially banned La Question to deal with the increasingly tense political atmosphere. Acting on a warrant from the military tribunal which began legal action against what it claimed was "attempted demoralization of the Army with intent to harm the defense of the nation", French authorities seized the 7,000 remaining copies at the Éditions de minuit publishing house on 27 March 1958; however, the 60,000 copies that had already been sold continued to circulate, and due to defiant publishers continuing the work throughout the Algerian war, there were more than 162,000 copies in France by the close of 1958.

The book was instrumental in revealing the extent to which torture was used in Algeria by the French Army; the methods used; how it maintained a low profile in the public opinion; and how torture had slipped from being used on terrorists, under preemptive, "ticking time bomb scenario" excuses, to being used freely to terrorise political opponents and the general population.

== Aftermath ==
Enquiries followed, during which Alleg proved able to accurately describe parts of El-Biar which detainees would not visit in the course of a normal detention, such as the kitchen where he was submitted to water torture.

La Question was adapted to cinema in 1977 by Laurent Heynemann as a film of the same name.

=== Source editions ===
- La Question, Éditions de Minuit, Paris, 1958. ISBN 2-7073-0175-2
- La Question, Éditions La Cité, Lausanne, 1958
- The Edge of the Abyss: The Question. New York: George Braziller
- La Question, Éditions Rahma, Algiers, 1992

== See also ==
- Torture during the Algerian War
- Censorship in France
- Philippe Erulin
- Roger Faulques
- André Charbonnier
