= Zoubiria =

Zoubiria الزبيرية
- Commune and town
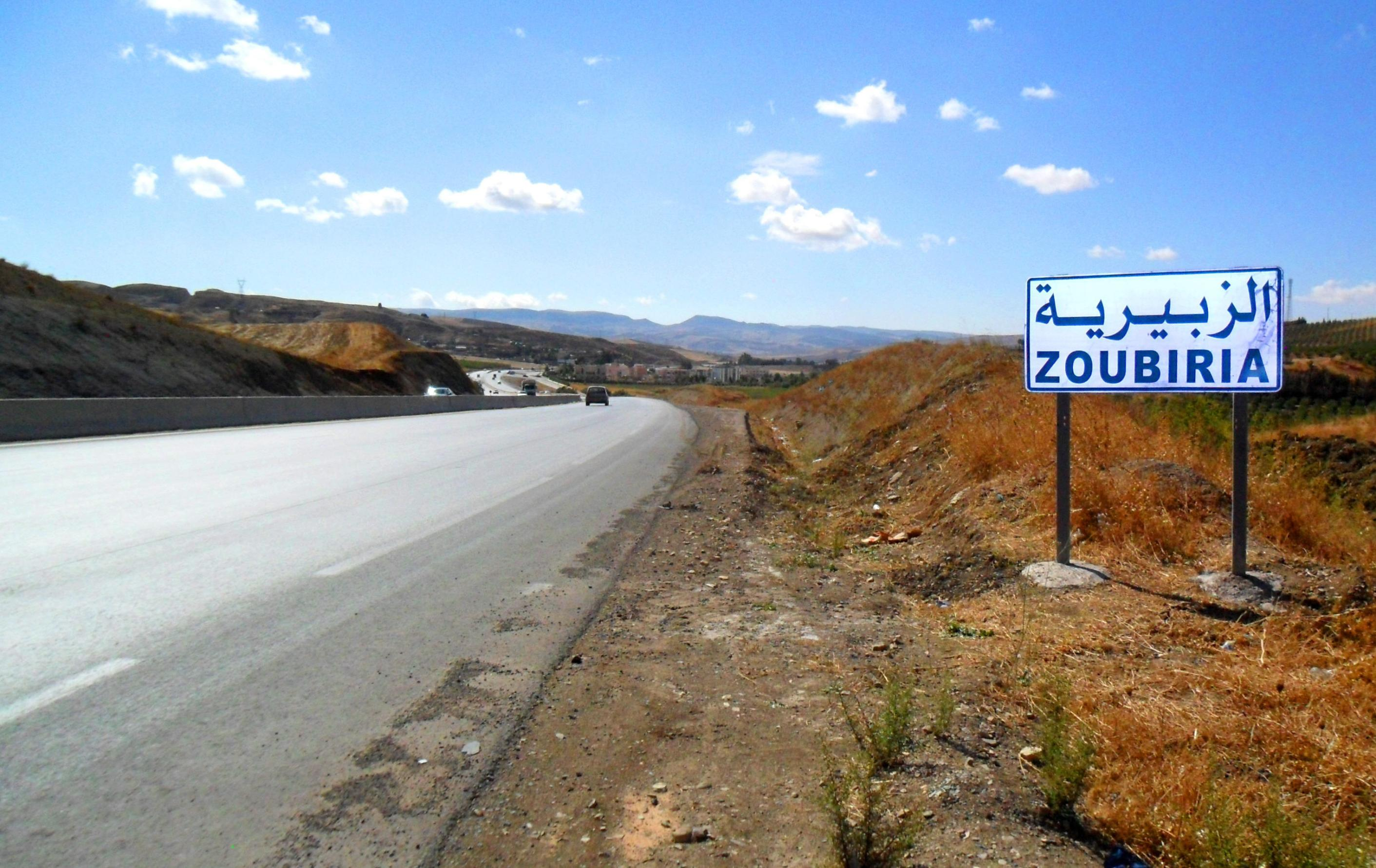

- Location within Algeria
- Coordinates: 36°4′N 2°54′E
- Country: Algeria
- Province: Médéa Province

Area
  - Total: 80.1 sq mi (207.4 km^{2})

Population (2008)
  - Total: 9,236
- Time zone: UTC+1 (CET)

Zoubiria is a town and commune in Médéa Province, Algeria. According to the 1998 census, it has a population of 15,009.
