= Ouled Bouachra =

Coordinates: 36°06′06″N 2°42′43″E

- Commune and town
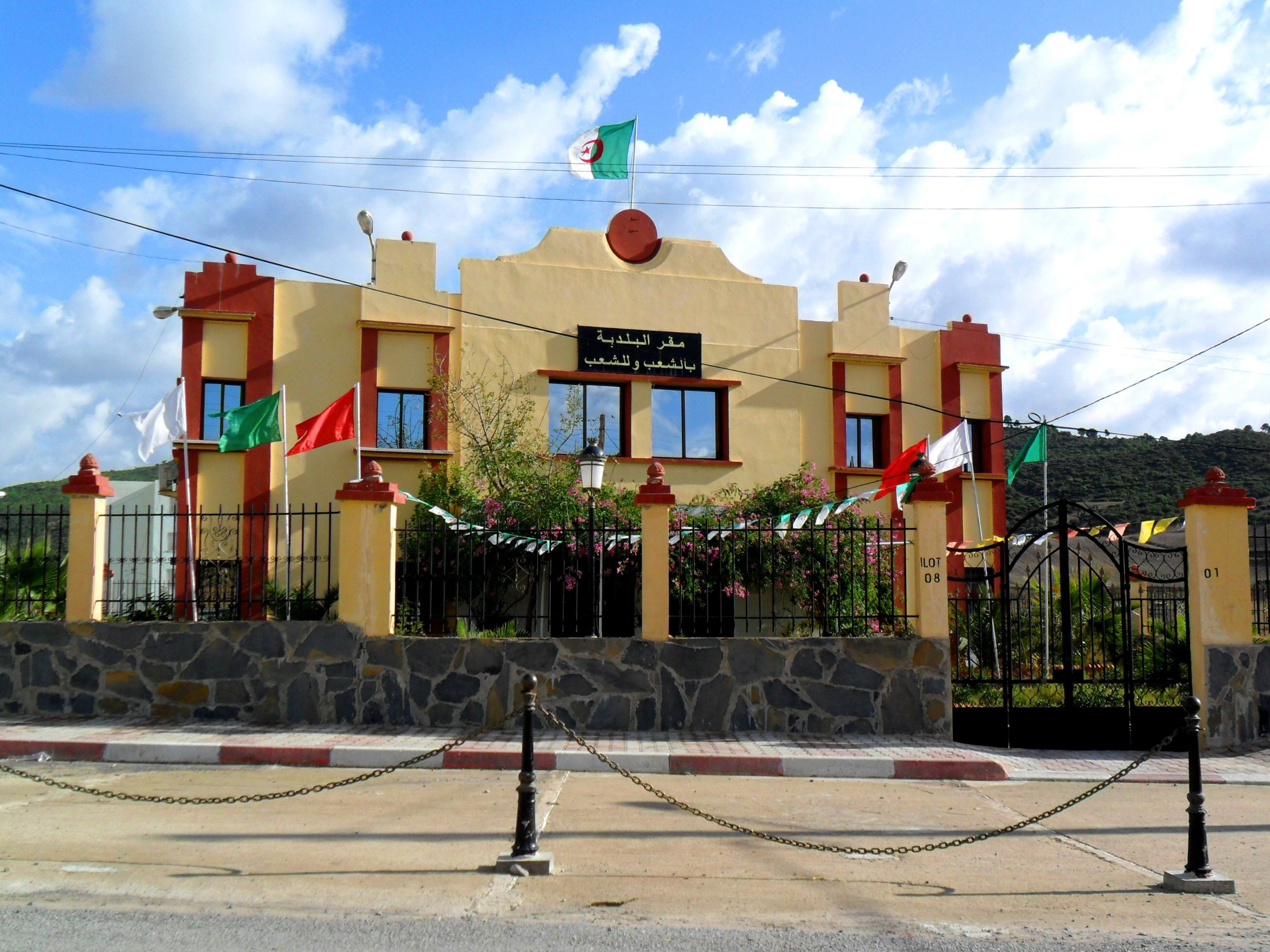
- Town hall
- Interactive map of Ouled Bouachra
- Country: Algeria
- Province: Médéa Province
- Time zone: UTC+1 (CET)

Ouled Bouachra is a town and commune in Médéa Province, Algeria.
