= El Hamdania =

- Commune and town
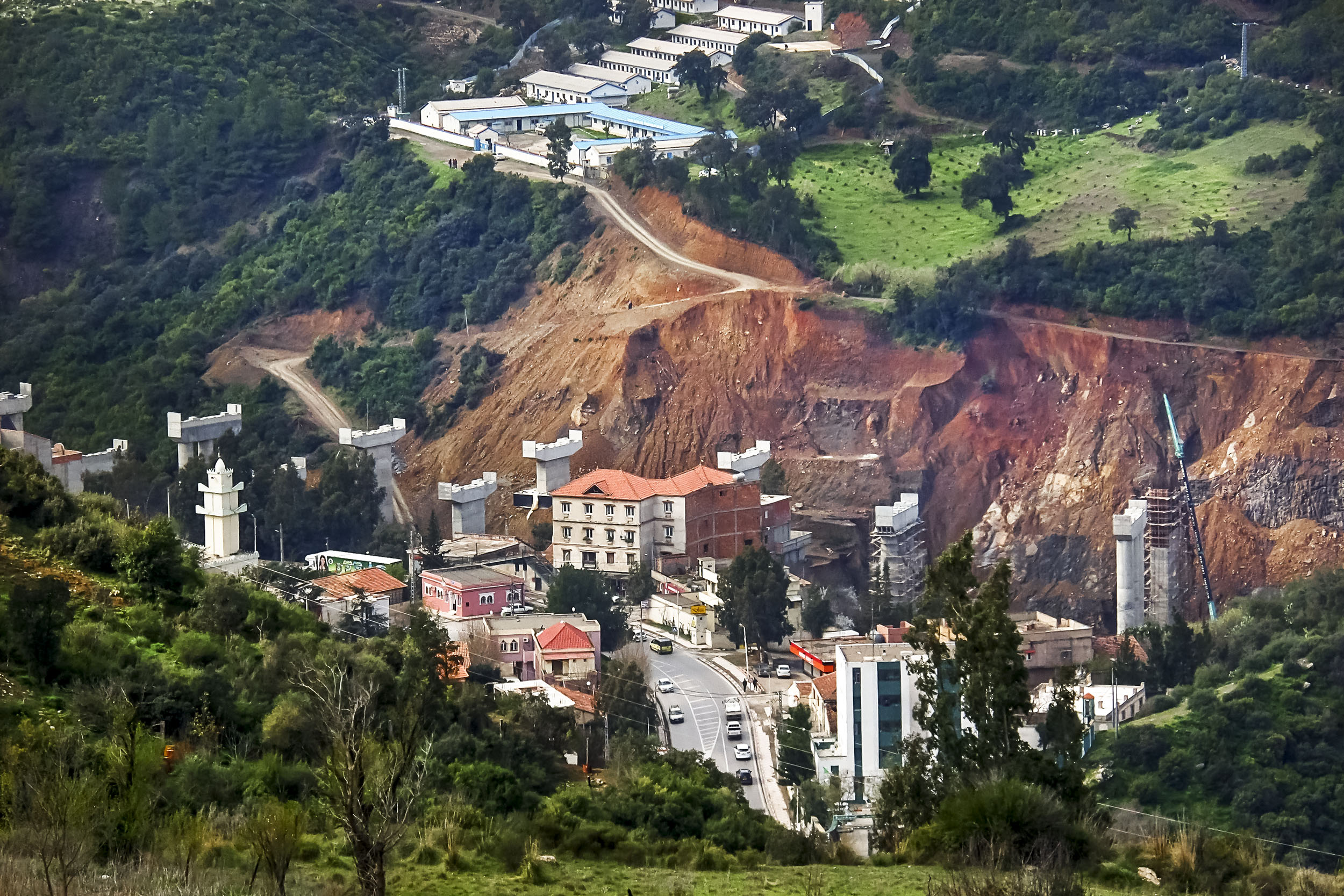

- Location within Algeria
- Coordinates: 36°21′42″N 2°45′59″E
- Country: Algeria
- Province: Médéa Province

Population (1998)
  - Total: 1,524
- Time zone: UTC+1 (CET)

El Hamdania (Arabic: الحمدانية) is a town and commune in Médéa Province, Algeria. According to the 1998 census, it has a population of 1,524.
