= Jacques Massu =

French general (1908–2002)

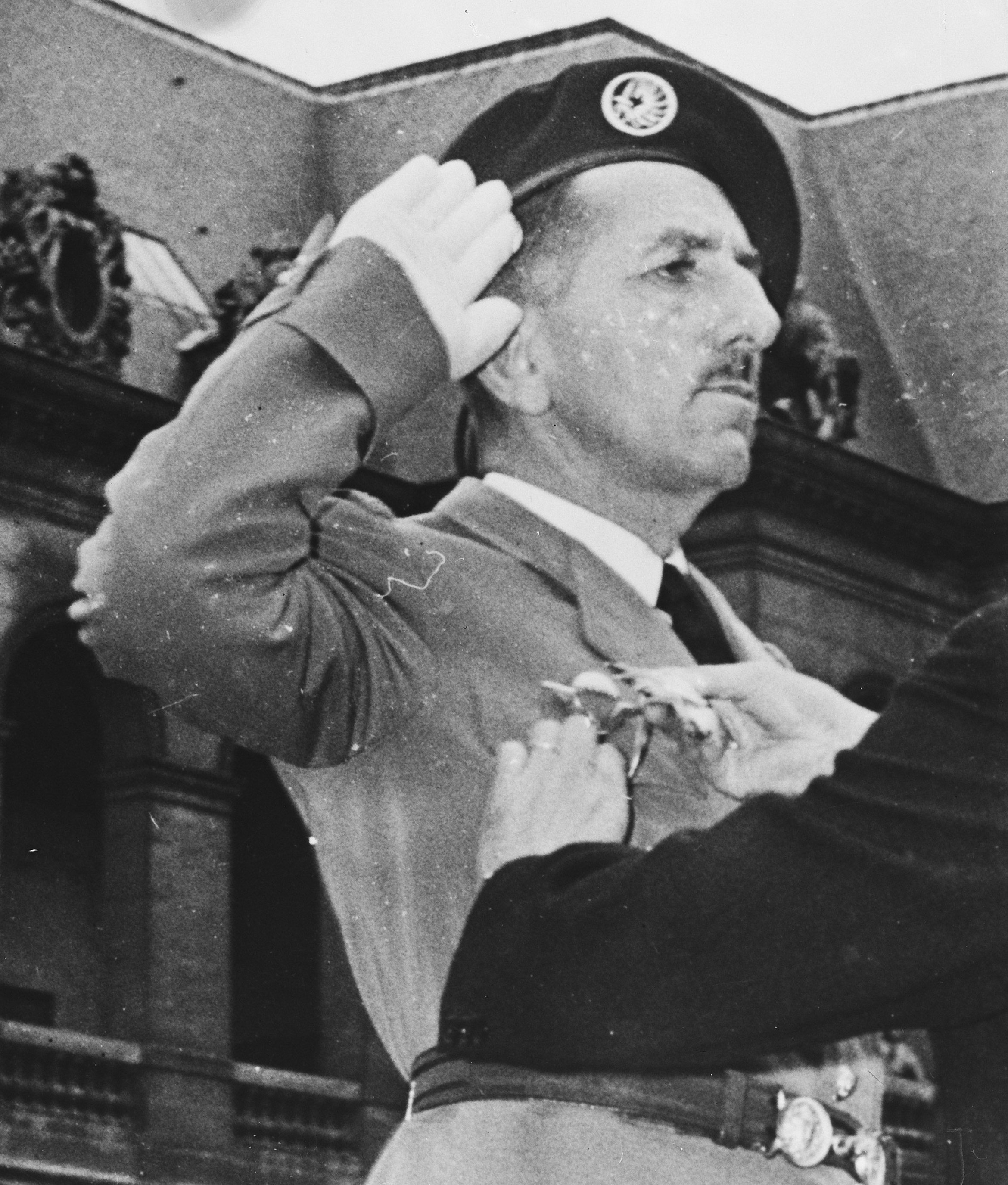
- Massu in 1958
- Born: 5 May 1908; Châlons-sur-Marne, France
- Died: 26 October 2002 (aged 94); Conflans-sur-Loing, France
- Military career
- Allegiance: France; Free French Forces
- Branch: French Army
- Service years: 1928–1969
- Rank: Général d'armée
- Commands: 10th Parachute Division (France); French forces in Germany
- Conflicts: World War II; Battle of Normandy; Liberation of Paris; Battle of Dompaire; First Indochina War; Algerian War; Battle of Algiers; Battle of Bouzegza; Battle of Ouled Bouachra; Suez Crisis
- Awards: Grand Cross of the Légion d'honneur Companion of the Liberation; Distinguished Service Order (UK)

Jacques Émile Massu (French pronunciation: [ʒak masy]; 5 May 1908 – 26 October 2002) was a French general who fought in World War II, the First Indochina War, the Algerian War and the Suez Crisis. He led French troops in the Battle of Algiers, first supporting and later denouncing their use of torture.

== Early life ==
Jacques Massu was born in Châlons-sur-Marne to a family of military officers; his father was an artillery officer. He studied successively at Saint-Louis de Gonzague in Paris, the Free College of Gien (1919–1925) and Prytanée National Militaire (1926–1928). He then entered Saint-Cyr and graduated in 1930 as a second lieutenant in the promotion class "Marshal Foch" and chose the Colonial Infantry.

Between October 1930 and August 1931, he served in the 16th Senegalese Tirailleur Regiment (16th RTS) in Cahors. He was sent to Morocco with the 5th RTS and took part in the fighting around Tafilalt where he earned his first citation. He was promoted to lieutenant in October 1932 and took part in the operations in High Atlas, earning a new citation.

In 1934 Massu was transferred to 12th RTS at Saintes, Charente-Maritime. He served in Togo from January 1935 to February 1937 performing military and civilian duties in Komkombas. Then he was stationed in Lorraine with the 41st RMIC until June 1938, when he was sent to Chad to command the subdivision of Tibesti with headquarters in Zouar.

== World War II ==
He was serving in Africa when World War II broke out, and joined the Free French Forces. He took part in the battle of Fezzan with the armoured troops of General Leclerc. In 1941, he was in charge of the bataillon de marche du Tchad. He served as a lieutenant-colonel in the 2nd Armored Division (2e DB) serving with distinction at the Battle of Dompaire in September 1944 earning the US Silver star. He served with the division until the end of the war.

== Indochina ==
In September 1945, he landed in Saigon and took part in the retaking of the city and of the South of Indochina.

Massu took command of a mechanized infantry force of the 2e DB named Groupement Massu, comprising a reconnaissance squadron with M8 Greyhound armoured cars from 7e Escadron, 1er Régiment de Marche de Spahis Marocains; a squadron of M5A1 Stuart light tanks of 1e Compagnie, 501e Régiment de chars de combat; a provisional infantry force of the 4e Bataillon, Régiment de marche du Tchad and the French Navy's Régiment Blindé de Fusiliers-Marins, with M3 Half-tracks; and engineer elements of the 71er Bataillon du Génie. This force was landed at Saigon between 10 and 15 October 1945, and was immediately deployed to recapture Mỹ Tho in the Mekong Delta from the Viet Minh.

== Egypt ==
In 1956, the 10th Parachute Division was sent to Egypt to take back the Suez Canal during the Suez Crisis. The 10th Parachute Division landed at Raswa. Raswa imposed the problem of a small drop zone surrounded by water, but Massu assured Andre Beaufre that this was not an insolvable problem for his men. 500 heavily armed paratroopers of the French 2nd Colonial Parachute Regiment (2ème RPC), hastily redeployed from combat in Algeria, jumped over the al-Raswa bridges from Nord Noratlas 2501 transports of the Escadrille de Transport (ET) 1/61 and ET 3/61, together with some combat engineers of the Guards Independent Parachute Company.

Despite the loss of two soldiers, the western bridge was swiftly secured by the paras, and F4U Corsairs of the Aéronavale 14.F and 15.F flew a series of close-air-support missions, destroying several SU-100 tank destroyers. F-84Fs also hit two large oil storage tanks in Port Said, which went up in flames and covered most of the city in a thick cloud of smoke for the next several days. Egyptian resistance varied, with some positions fighting back until destroyed, while others were abandoned with little resistance. The French paratroopers stormed and took Port Said's waterworks that morning, an important objective to control in a city in the desert. Chateau-Jobert followed up this success by beginning an attack on Port Fuad. Derek Varble, the American military historian, later wrote "Air support and fierce French assaults transformed the fighting at Port Fuad into a rout". During the fighting in the Canal Zone, the French paratroopers often practiced their "no-prisoners'" code and executed Egyptian POWs.

== Algeria ==
A brigadier general in June 1955, Massu commanded the groupe parachutiste d'intervention and from 1956 the 10th Parachute Division. Massu's division was sent to Algeria in response to a wave of armed attacks and bombings coordinated by Algerian FLN. Massu ultimately won the Battle of Algiers in 1957, during which French forces were able to identify and arrest the leadership of the FLN in Algiers through the use of coercive methods of interrogation and torture on members of subordinate cells. In July 1958, he was promoted to général de division and took the head of the army corps of Algiers, as well as functions of prefect for the region of Algiers. It was said of Massu that he willingly admitted to the use of torture on suspected members of the FLN. He insisted that he would never subject anyone to any treatment that he had not first tried out on himself. In Gillo Pontecorvo's 1966 film The Battle of Algiers, a controversial depiction of the events in Algiers between 1954 and 1957 banned in France for five years after release for alleged pro-Algerian leanings, the principal French character Col. Mathieu is a composite based on Massu and several of his subordinates, likely including Roger Trinquier and Marcel Bigeard.

== 1958 coup d'état ==
The Algiers putsch of 1958 began when the current government suggested that it would negotiate with the FLN, bringing the instability and ineffectiveness of the Fourth Republic to a head. On 13 May right-wing elements seized power in Algiers and called for a Government of Public Safety under General de Gaulle. Massu became chairman of the Public Safety Committee and one of the leaders of the revolt. The putschists threatened to conduct an assault on Paris, involving paratroopers and armoured forces based at Rambouillet, unless Charles de Gaulle was placed in charge of the Republic. De Gaulle did so on condition that a new constitution would be introduced creating a powerful presidency in which a sole executive, the first of which was to be de Gaulle, ruled for seven-year periods. These changes were introduced and the Fifth Republic was born.

On 14 January 1960, Massu gave an interview with the Süddeutsche Zeitung newspaper in which he declared,

The Army has the power. It did not show it yet, because the opportunity did not arise. But the Army will use its power in one precise occasion (...) it encourages settlers to constitute paramilitary organisations and provides them weapons.

Massu was immediately summoned to Paris where he was relieved of command and posted to Metz. He was replaced in Algeria by General Jean Crépin.

== Later life ==
After his criticism of the policy of de Gaulle in 1960, Massu was fired from his position of military governor of Algiers. In 1962 he became military governor of Metz and of the Sixth military region in France. He was promoted to général de corps d'armée (4 stars) in 1963. In March 1966, he became général d'armée (5 stars) and was made chief of the French forces in Germany. On 29 May 1968, de Gaulle came to visit him at his headquarters in Baden-Baden during the events of May 68. Massu assured de Gaulle of his support, but according to some sources conditioned it upon an amnesty for French soldiers involved in the Organisation armée secrète who had opposed Algerian independence and attempted to assassinate de Gaulle on several occasions.

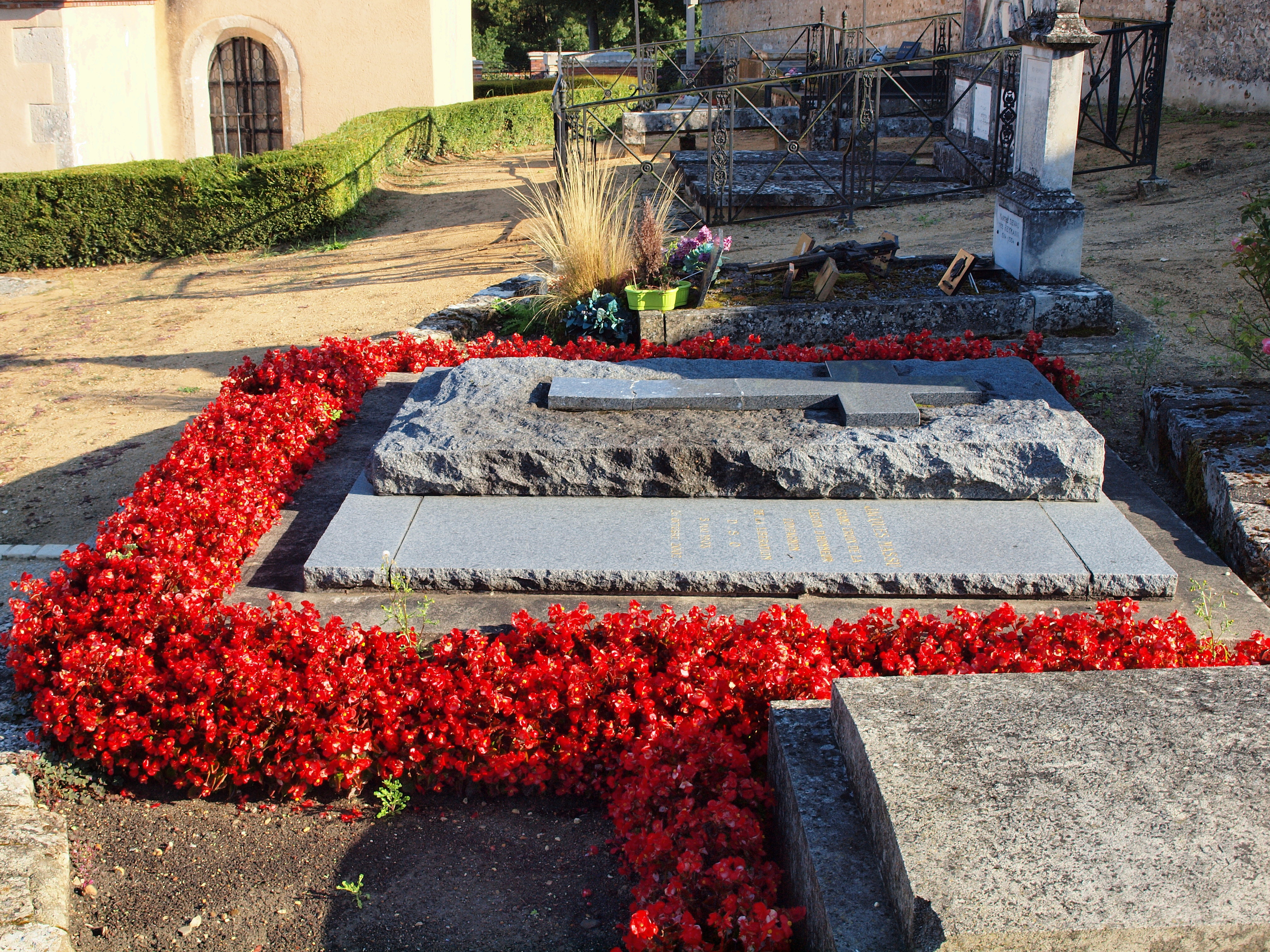
General Massu's grave in Conflans-sur-Loing.

Massu retired from military duty in July 1969 and spent the rest of his life in his home at Conflans-sur-Loing writing his memoirs. On 15 June 2000, Louisette Ighilahriz, a woman who had been a member of the FLN, accused Massu and Marcel Bigeard in an interview published in Le Monde newspaper of being present when she was tortured and raped by the French Army at a military prison in 1957. Ighilahriz had come forward with her story as she wanted to thank one "Richaud", an Army doctor at the prison, for saving her life, saying that Dr. Richaud was a most kindly man who always treated her injuries. In response, Massu told Le Monde that "torture had been part of a certain ambience in Algiers in 1957". Massu denied being present when Ighilahriz had been tortured and raped, saying he could not remember her, but expressed "regret" that the paras had engaged in torture and used rape as an interrogation tool, saying that there were things that had happened that he had wished had never happened in Algeria. Bigeard by contrast called Ighilahriz's story a "tissue of lies" designed to "destroy all that is decent in France", going on to say this "Richaud" had never existed. Bigeard was contradicted by Massu, who confirmed the existence of "Richaud", saying that Ighilahriz was referring to Dr. François Richaud who had been the doctor stationed at the prison in 1957.

Massu died at Conflans-sur-Loing on 26 October 2002, aged 94.

== Decorations ==
- Grand Cross of the Légion d'honneur
- Companion of the Liberation (14 July 1941)
- Croix de guerre 1939–1945 (8 citations)
- Croix de guerre des théâtres d'opérations extérieures (3 citations)
- Croix de la Valeur Militaire (2 citations)
- Distinguished Service Order (UK)
- Grand Officer of the Ordre du Nichan El-Anouar
- Grand Officer of the Order of the Black Star
- Bundesverdienstkreuz (West Germany)

== Quotations ==
- "Give me two divisions and tomorrow, you can take your breakfast on the boulevard Saint Germain" (to De Gaulle, about May '68)
- "I am a soldier, I obey"
- Charles de Gaulle: "So, Massu, are you still stupid?"
  - Jacques Massu's answer: "Still a Gaullist, General!"

== Bibliography ==
- Codevilla, Angelo and Seabury, Paul. War: Ends and Means, Second Edition. Virginia: Potomac Books, 2006.
- Grando, Denis and Valynseele, Joseph. "À la découverte de leurs racines", L'Intermédiaire des Chercheurs et Curieux, Paris, 1988.
