= Jean Rouaud =

French author (born 1952)

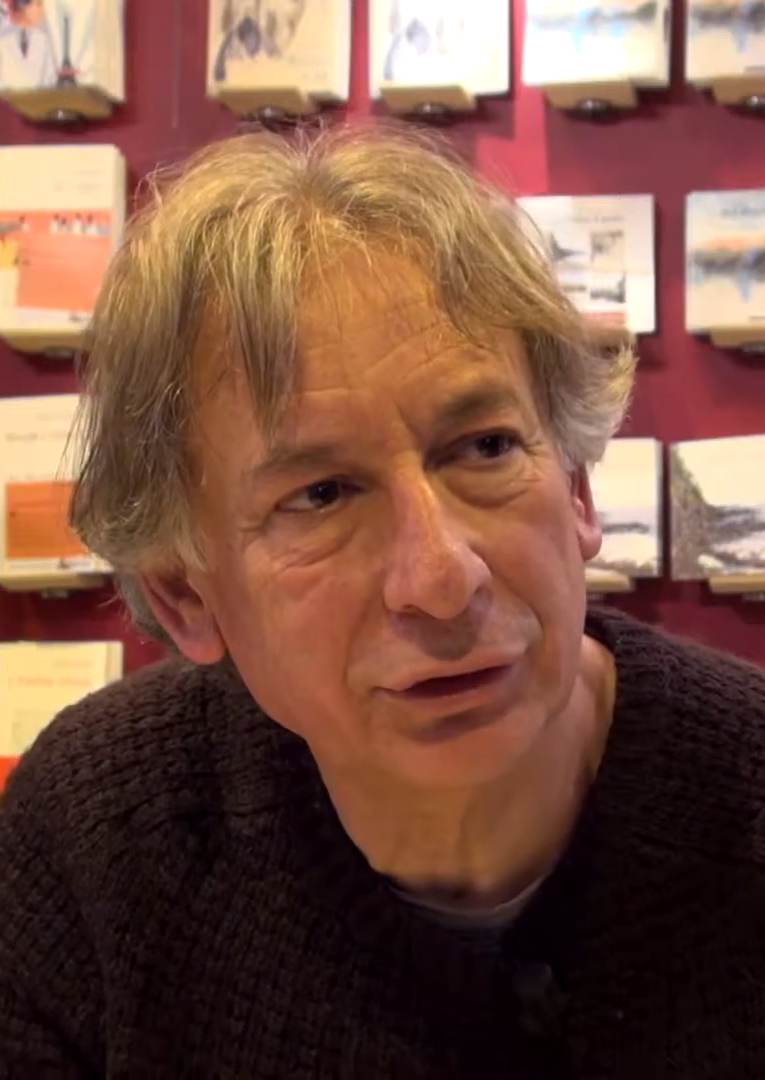
Jean Rouaud in 2015.

Jean Rouaud (French pronunciation: [ʒɑ̃ ʁwo]; born 13 December 1952) is a French author, who was born in Campbon, Loire-Atlantique. In 1990 his novel Fields of Glory (French: Les Champs d'honneur) won the Prix Goncourt. First believed to be the first book in a trilogy, Fields of Glory turned out to be the first book in a series of five books on the family history of the author.

== English bibliography ==
- Fields of Glory. trans. Ralph Manheim. New York: Arcade. 1992. ISBN 1-55970-165-X.
- Of Illustrious Men. trans. Barbara Wright. New York: Arcade. 1994. ISBN 1-55970-265-6.
- The World, More or Less. trans. Barbara Wright. New York: Arcade. 1998. ISBN 1-55970-405-5.
- La femme promise. 2008.
