= Henri Alleg =

French-Algerian journalist (1921–2013)

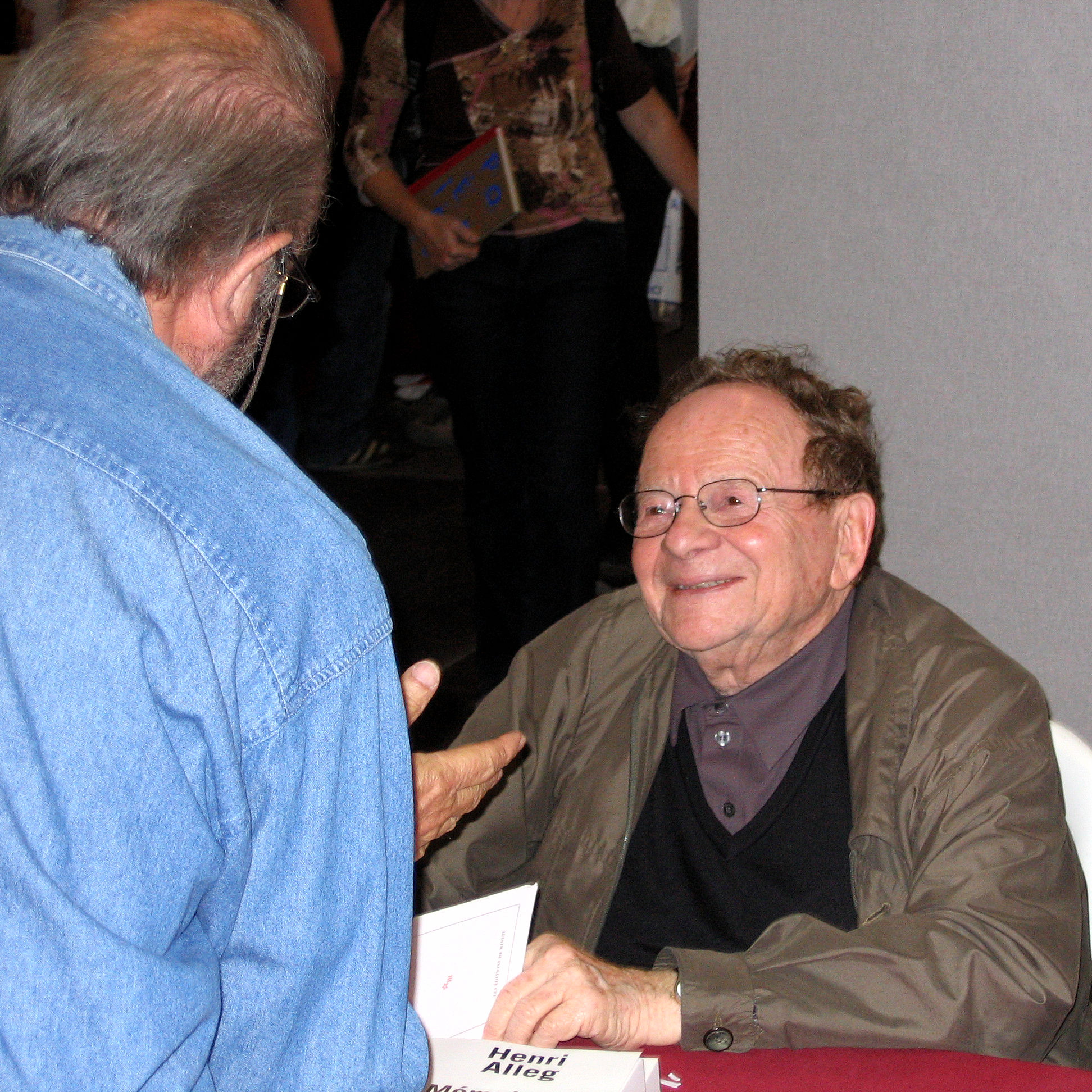
- Alleg at the Fête de l'Humanité in 2008
- Born: Harry John Salem; 20 July 1921; London, England
- Died: 17 July 2013 (aged 91); France
- Occupation: Journalist
- Employer: Alger républicain
- Known for: La Question (1958), anti-torture activism
- Notable work: La Question
- Movement: Anti-colonialism, Algerian independence

Henri Alleg (20 July 1921 – 17 July 2013), born as Harry John Salem, was a French-Algerian journalist, director of the Alger républicain newspaper, and a member of the French Communist Party. After Editions de Minuit, a French publishing house, released his memoir La Question in 1958. Alleg gained international recognition for his stance against torture, specifically within the context of the Algerian War (1954–1962).

== Early life ==
Alleg was born in London on 20 July 1921 to Jewish parents of Russian-Polish origin. During his childhood in Paris, Alleg never fully embraced his Jewish identity, and in later years came to see Israel "as practising racist colonialism" similar to France's in Algeria. His early educational years coincided with the Spanish Civil War, during which time he was met with an increasingly politicized school environment with Italian refugees who opposed Mussolini arriving in France along with Jewish Germans.

== Early journalism career and controversy ==
Alleg left for Algeria in 1939 and, at the age of 18, became intimately involved with the Algerian Communist Party. A 15-year-old Georgette Cottin served as an intermediary with the leaders of the Jeunesses Communistes and supplied a typewriter and roneo saved from the headquarters of the Youth Hostels of Algiers which made it possible to publish a few issues of the Jeune Garde newspaper.

Postwar, Alleg worked from 1950 to 1955 as editor-in-chief of the Alger Républicain, a daily paper sympathetic to Algerian nationalism. In 1951, Alleg became director of the publication, which alone in Algeria advocated a free democratic press for Algerian grievances against France. The newspaper was banned in September 1955 by the French authorities due to its communist and anti-colonial perspective. In November 1956, after many of his colleagues at the newspaper were arrested by French colonial authorities, Alleg went into hiding, maintaining his journalistic connections by continuing to submit pro-independence articles to the French Communist journal l'Humanité. Many of his articles never saw publication due to government censorship of writing that advocated Algerian independence.

== Initial arrest and torture ==
On 12 June 1957, Alleg was arrested on suspicion of undermining the power of the state by France's 10th Paratrooper Division in the home of his friend, mathematics professor Maurice Audin, who had been arrested the day before and later died under torture by the French state during the Battle of Algiers. Alleg underwent one month of torture in El-Biar, a suburb of Algiers, despite the fact that no charges had been laid against him. While in French custody, Alleg was submitted to many kinds of cruel tortures, both physical and mental, in an effort to get him to reveal the names of those who had sheltered him for the past several months. His "treatment" consisted of electric shocks, burning, forced swallowing and inhaling of water to simulate drowning (now known as water boarding), and being hung from various devices. He was also injected with an experimental dose of the barbiturate sodium pentothal, which was thought to be a kind of truth serum. Despite the intensity of his torture and the relentless pursuit of answers by the French "paras", Alleg never talked or revealed the names of anyone who aided or abetted him in his undercover life. While imprisoned, French soldiers visited Henri's wife and questioned her about his activities and whereabouts. She was not subjected to any use of force, but was considered under arrest for the five days of her questioning.

As his French torturers realized that Alleg would rather die than betray those who hid him, they transferred him to Lodi camp in Algiers, where he recovered at the Barberousse military hospital and prison. He wrote a letter to his wife confirming his presence at the Lodi camp and saying that he "hoped to regain his health, given rest and time."

== La Question and censorship ==
It was in the Lodi camp that Alleg wrote and smuggled out an account of his ordeal. His wife, Gilberte, who at the time had been deported from Algeria, would receive the pages, type them, and distribute them to the French literary and journalistic connections that Alleg had made during his tenure at the Algier républicain. His declarations of maltreatment were printed in L'Humanité in late July; however, the public remained in the dark about the situation as the French police promptly seized the whole of the issue in which Alleg's claims were to be made public.

Gilberte worked tirelessly to present the memoir to various publishing houses all while campaigning to raise awareness around the reality of what was transpiring in Algeria. At one public meeting in Paris, Gilbert pleaded the metropolitan French population to act. "If the 'sequestration' of my husband, the 'escape' of Maurice Audin, [and] the 'trial' of Djamila Bouhired had an exceptional impact, these are not exceptional cases. This is the daily reality in our country...we expect you to help us to stop all executions...we ask you for an immense effort, an effort commensurate with your responsibility."

While most publishers expressed interest in what Alleg had to say, they were hesitant, given the political climate, to publish it themselves and jeopardize their business. Gilberte persisted until she succeeded in getting her husband's work published by Editions de Minuit as La Question, a play on words referring to both the question of the legitimacy of torture and the fact that "la question" was the technical term for torture in the pre-Revolutionary French judicial system. Upon the initial publication, on 12 February 1958, La Question met with no attempts at censorship and did not evoke an initial denial from the French government. However the Ministry of the Interior did censor French newspapers that attempted to comment on or publish excerpts of the memoir.

In one example, although at this point Alleg's book itself had been freely on sale for several weeks, the French government confiscated a March 1958 issue of France Observateur because the publication reproduced sections of Alleg's book. At this point, the government accepted the memoir itself, but did not condone public discussion of Alleg's claims and situation. Part of this had to do with the censorship process of the French government, which has a legal "droit de regard" that allows a local government prefecture to read newspapers but not books before they are published.

Despite the seizure of articles pertaining to or citing the book, La Question itself became a "near bestseller and a subject of lively debate" in the French nation. During this time, the French government also seized "A Victory", an article published in L'Express in which Jean-Paul Sartre outlined the implications of Alleg's book for the French nation. Although censored, this essay continued to be distributed clandestinely and later became the preface to the book's English translation.

As rumors of torture proliferated and public discussion turned increasingly critical, the French government officially banned La Question in hopes of combating France's increasingly tense political atmosphere. Acting on a warrant from the military tribunal which recently began legal action in connection with "attempted demoralization of the Army with intent to harm the defense of the nation", French authorities seized the 7,000 remaining copies at the Éditions de Minuit publishing house on 27 March 1958; however, they could do nothing about the more than 60,000 copies that had already been sold. La Question continued to sell, clandestinely or otherwise, over 162,000 copies in France alone by the close of 1958.

After the initial seizure, other leftist French publishers continued production of the book, a defiance that continued well throughout the Algerian War despite the official ban. On the day La Question was seized, the French government released information that the inquiry into the alleged torture of Alleg was nearly completed. They claimed that although doctors had noted scars on M. Alleg's wrists and groin, the officers accused by Alleg continued to deny the charges levied against them, and therefore no charges were brought against the French government.

== The trial ==
In August 1957, Henri sent a similar account of his torture from the civil prison in Algiers to both lawyers and judicial authorities in Algeria. At this point in Algiers, rumors were flying in the Algerian press about his disappearance or even death. It was only with Alleg's complaint and after a broad press campaign that Alleg was presented before an examining magistrate, two full months after his arrest.

The officers accused by M. Alleg publicly denied the charges levied against them. Robert Lacoste, then Minister of Algeria, claimed that an investigation was proceeding to determine the truth of the "allegations." The "trial", which was held in November 1957, found Alleg guilty of attacking the external safety of the state and attempting to reconstitute a dissolved league. Military authorities sent in two doctors to examine Alleg; however, no one from outside the French government was allowed to see Henri after his transferral to Lodi. This raised suspicions in the public, at least to those who were paying attention. However, as a result of M. Alleg's charges against the paratroopers, the general commanding officer in Algiers ordered an inquiry to be opened against "persons unknown" for "assault causing bodily harm".

The military judge traveled with Alleg to visit the buildings in which Alleg claimed to be tortured and had Alleg describe the interior from memory in order to substantiate his assertions. Indeed, Alleg was able to describe with a high degree of accuracy several parts of El-Biar, especially the kitchen where torture was known to occur. This suggested that he had truly been mistreated, for, had the interrogation proceeded "normally", Alleg would not have been able to accurately describe the torture room. Despite this evidence that Alleg and others were actually tortured by the French paratroopers at El-Biar, the French government continued to ignore Alleg's demands for justice and put him back into an army jail.

== Escape and return to France ==
Alleg escaped from prison and made his way to Czechoslovakia. With the passing of the Évian Accords in 1962, Alleg returned to France and then Algeria. He helped rebuild the Alger Républicain and continued to publish numerous books and appear in several documentaries.

Declared persona non grata in Algeria following the 1965 military coup d'état of Houari Boumédiène, Alleg moved again to France in the Paris region, where he lived until his death in 2013, aged 91.

== Works ==
- Mémoire algérienne: souvenirs de luttes et d'espérances (2005); trans. by Gila Walker as The Algerian Memoirs: Days of Hope and Combat (2011).
- Grande aventure d'Alger républicain (co-authored with Boualem Khalfa and Abdelhamid Benzine, 1987)
- Prisonniers de guerre (1961)
- La Question / The Question (Introd. by Jean-Paul Sartre, 1958)
- Requiem pour l'Oncle Sam (1991)
- U.R.S.S. et les juifs (1989)
- Victorieuse Cuba : de la guérilla au socialisme (Preface by Boualem Khalfa, 1963)
- Red Star and Green Crescent, Progress Publishers, translated into English by Sergei Sossinsky, 1985. (Originally published by Messidor, Paris, in 1983.) 230 pages. Listed on abebooks.com

== See also ==
- Torture during the Algerian War
- Censorship in France
