= Censorship in France =

France has a long history of governmental censorship, particularly in the 16th to 20th centuries, but today freedom of press is guaranteed by the French Constitution and instances of governmental censorship are limited.

There was strong governmental control over radio and television during the 1950s–1970s. Today, the ARCOM is only responsible for overseeing the observance of French law by the media, such as the 1990 Gayssot Act which prohibits racist and religious hate speech (which historical revisionism, in particular but not only Holocaust denial falls under), and time period allocated to each political party during pre-electoral periods. Furthermore, other laws prohibit homophobic hate speech, and a 1970 law prohibits the advocacy of illegal drugs. In 2016, a television ad which advocated that babies with Down Syndrome should not be aborted solely because of their syndrome ran. It was ruled anti-abortion speech and removed.

Each of these laws has been criticized by some groups, either from the left (especially concerning the 1970 law on drugs) or from the far right (in particular concerning the 1990 Gayssot Act or the laws prohibiting homophobic attacks). Others express the need for minorities to be protected from hate speech which may lead, according to them, to heinous acts and hate crimes, while still others claim that one cannot tolerate free speech concerning drugs as it is a matter of public health and moral order. However, the 2005 vote of the law on colonialism voted by the UMP conservative parliamentary majority has lifted a debate, especially among historians, concerning the legitimacy and relevancy of such "memory laws." Although a fair amount of historians are opposed to such laws, few advocate their repeal because they think that repealing democratically agreed upon laws would be a greater evil. Finally, critics, in particular, but not only, from the left wing, have criticized economic censorship, in particular through concentration of media ownership (Bouygues' influence, for instance, on TF1), or the fact that Dassault or Lagardère, both military firms, control several newspapers in France, such as Le Figaro (owned by Dassault).

Overall, freedom of press is guaranteed by the French Constitution but several effective cases of censorship against newspapers (Le Canard enchaîné, Charlie Hebdo and Hara-Kiri newspapers, etc.), films, or radio-shows, have been registered in the history of the Fifth Republic, founded in 1958. According to Human Rights Watch, 6 percent of French people investigated for "apology for terrorism" are under the age of 14.

== History of freedom of press and censorship in France ==
=== To the 18th century ===
Censorship in France may be traced to the Middle Ages. In 1275 Philip III of France put Parisian scriptoria under the control of the University of Paris which inspected manuscript books to verify that they were correctly copied. Correctness of text, not content, was the concern until the early 16th century, when tracts by Martin Luther were printed. On June 13, 1521, Francis I of France decreed that all (religious) books had to be read and approved by the Faculty of Theology of the university, and on August 3, 1521, Parlement ordered that all Lutheran books must be deposited within one week. In 1526, the Parlement of Paris and the Sorbonne issued a ban on the publishing of the Bible in French. On January 13, 1535, an extreme statute was enacted forbidding all printing under threat of hanging and closing all bookshops. This law was quickly abandoned, and Parlement formed a commission to review book printing.

In 1536 it was ordered that all medical books must be approved by the Medical Faculty of the university, and actions were taken against certain publishers of books on medicine and astrology. In 1544, the university banned the printing of any book not approved by the appropriate University officials. In 1543, the Faculty of Theology issued its first Index of prohibited books, all religious, preceding by 16 years the Vatican's issuance of the Index Librorum Prohibitorum in 1559. The Edict of Châteaubriant issued on June 27, 1551, prohibited possessing any books listed on the university's Index; translating the Bible or works of the Church Fathers; importing books from Geneva and other places not under the Church's control; or printing or selling of any religious books written in the last 40 years.

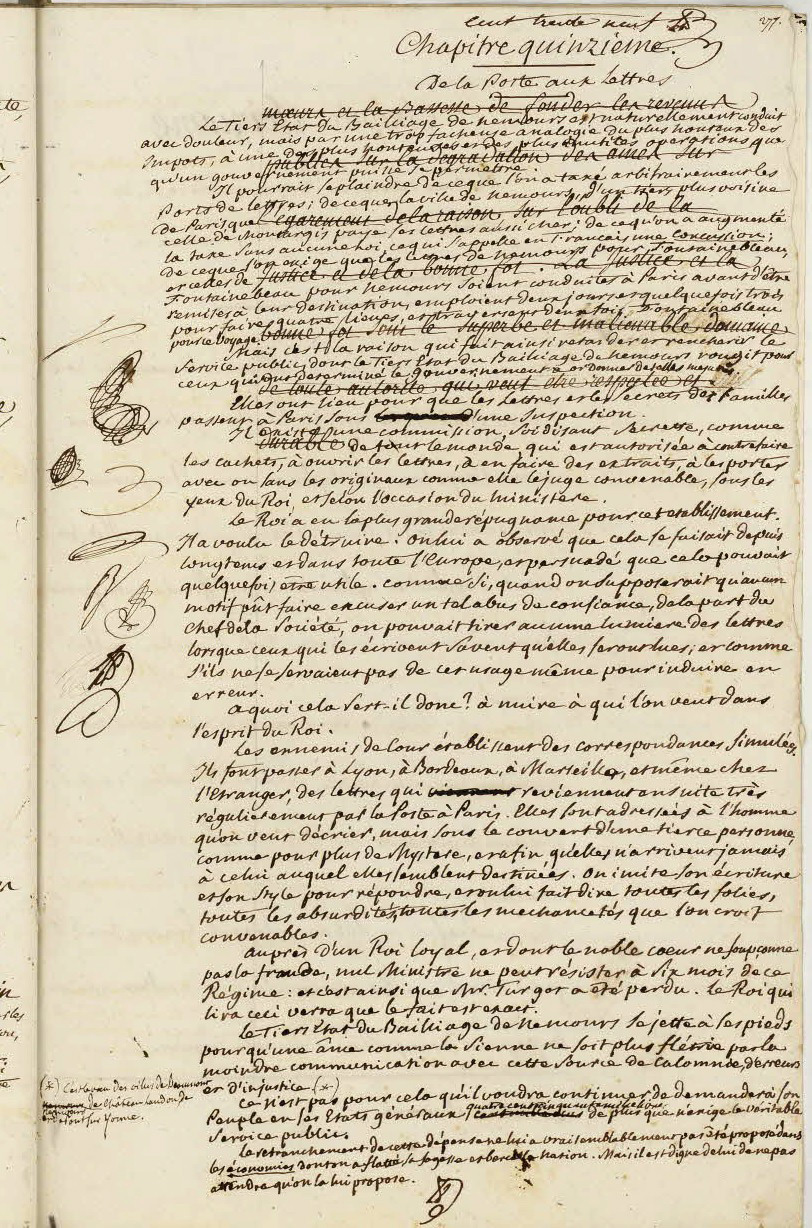
Nemours' cahiers de doléances asking for the end of censorship, 1789. French National Archives

The state itself began to take a greater role in censorship over the university and in 1566, the Ordonnance of Moulins was issued, banning the writing, printing or selling of defamatory books attacking individuals' good reputations and requiring that all books published must be approved and include the privilege and the great seal. The state control was strengthened in 1571 by the edict of Gaillon which placed enforcement of the censorship laws in the Chancellor's office instead of the university.

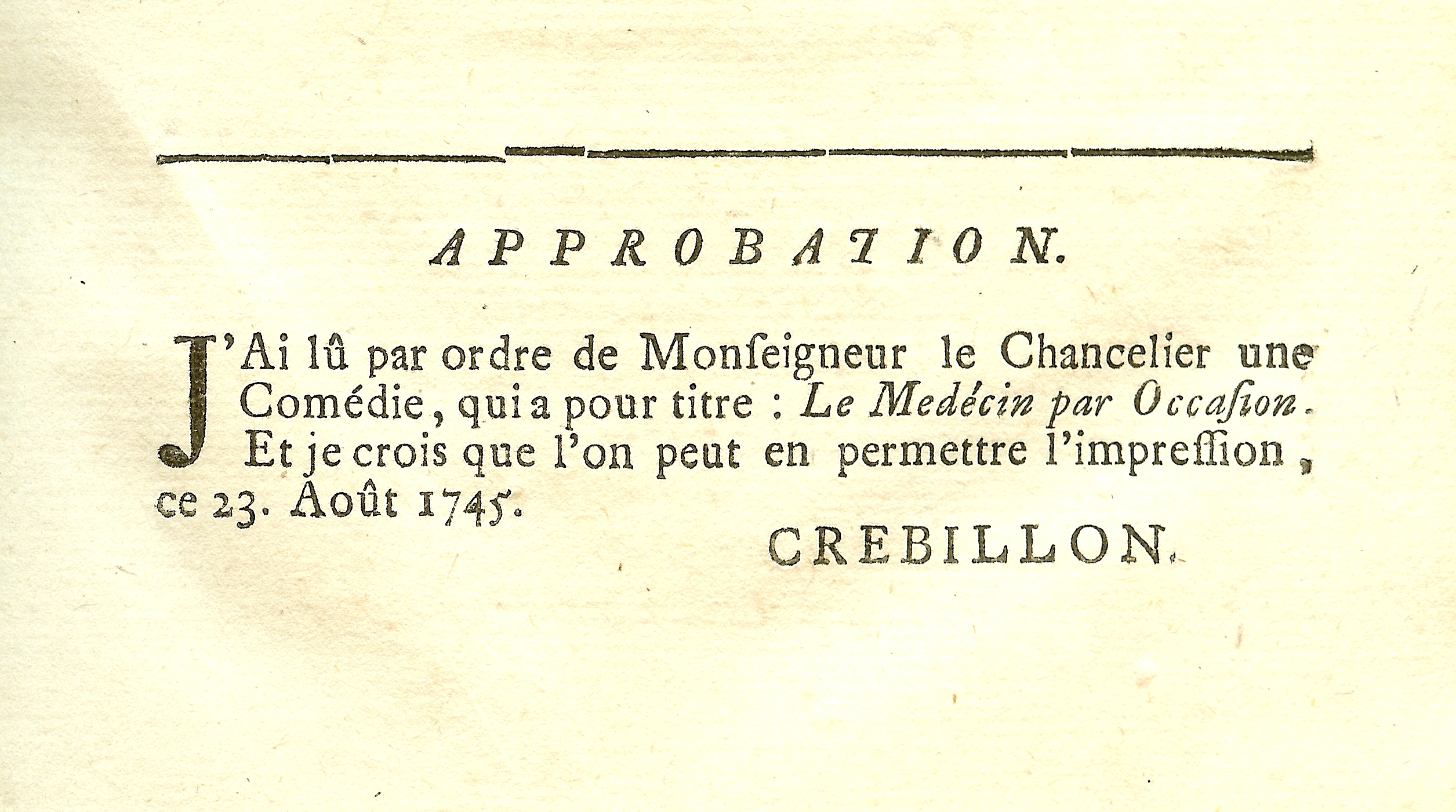
A censor's approval in a play printed in Paris in 1746, De Boissy's Le Medecin par Occasion

The concern of the censors was "heresy, sedition and personal libel" until 1629, when censorship began to focus also on immorality and indecency. "Nevertheless ... the government was never so much concerned about looseness of morals as it was about freedom of thought." Manuscripts had to be approved by the Chancellor before publication and a register of permits was maintained. During the 17th century, the university and the state fought over control of censorship, which was haphazard. In 1653, the university was stripped of authority and replaced by royal censors. The royal censors office expanded in the 18th century and banned hundreds of titles. Books that were approved were required to include the censor's name and certificate of approval. Censorship was eventually under the authority of the office of the Director of the Book Trade, the most famous of which was Lamoignon de Malesherbes. Penalties for violations ranged from confiscation of books which often were burned, fines, imprisonment and even death. In the later 18th century these rules were increasingly evaded by printers and booksellers.

=== 19th century ===
The loi sur la liberté de la presse of 29 July 1881 was passed under the French Third Republic in 1881 by the then-dominant Opportunist Republicans who sought to liberalise the press and promote free public discussion. The new law swept away a swathe of earlier statutes, stating at the outset the principle that "Printing and publication are free".

Following Auguste Vaillant's assassination attempt, the first anti-terrorist laws was voted in 1893, which were quickly denounced as lois scélérates. These laws severely restricted freedom of expression. The first one condemned apology of any felony or crime as a felony itself, permitting widespread censorship of the press. The second one allowed to condemn any person directly or indirectly involved in a propaganda of the deed act, even if no killing was effectively carried on. The last one condemned any person or newspaper using anarchist propaganda (and, by extension, socialist libertarians present or former members of the International Workingmen's Association (IWA):

1. Either by provocation or apology [...] incited one or more persons to commit either robbery, or the crimes of murder, pillage, or arson [...]; 2. Or directed a provocation towards soldiers in the Army or Navy, with the aim of diverting them from their military duties and the obedience they owe their superiors ... would be referred to the police correctional courts and punished by imprisonment for three months to two years.

=== 20th century ===
==== World War I ====
During World War I, postal censorship was in force, as the French state thought it necessary to control the public's morale and thus engaged in a sort of psychological warfare. Censorship was current during the war, leading to the 1915 creation of Le Canard enchaîné weekly, which used satires and other games of words to pass through "Anastasia's scissors", as was popularly called the censors (such word games still exist in Le Canard, for leisure purposes, such as the section named "Sur l'album de la Comtesse")..

==== World War II ====
France fell to German forces in May 1940. The occupying German military administration set up a propaganda effort headquartered in Paris, with branches (Propagandastaffel) in major cities. The propaganda effort included monitoring and censorship of the French press and of publishing, film, advertising and speeches.

==== Fifth Republic ====
Censorship laws were revoked with the founding of the Fifth Republic in 1958, although cases of censorship still occurred (in particular concerning films or satirical newspapers). The proclamation of the state of emergency, used during the Algerian War (1954–1962) and also in 2005, during the civil unrest, allows the state to legally censor news articles and other media productions (used during the Algerian War, this censorship disposition was not used in 2005)..

Henri Alleg's book La Question denouncing torture by the French Army during the Algerian war was censored, as well as other similar books and films, such as The Battle of Algiers.

In 2003, UMP deputy Nadine Morano called on Interior Minister (UMP) Nicolas Sarkozy to prosecute the hip hop group Sniper for inciting violence against the police. after the 2005 riots 200 UMP deputies, led by François Grosdidier, brought a petition against several groups including Fabe, Sniper, 113, Lunatic, and others. In March 2006 Grosdidier, frustrated by failure of court actions, proposed a law (no.2957) to amend the law of 29 July 1881 to explicitly remove speech protections for music and sanction racism against the majority by a minority.

In 1987 a law repressing inciting suicide was passed, after a best-selling book called Suicide, mode d'emploi was published in 1982. The bill was first adopted by the Senate in 1983; in 1987, during the debates before the National Assembly, the book was cited by name as a prime example of what was to be banned. This book, written by two anarchists (Claude Guillon and Yves Le Bonniec), contained a historic and theoretical account of suicide, as well as a critical overview of ways to commit suicide. The book could not be rereleased in 1989 because of that law. The book is thus censored de facto, unavailable in all libraries and bookshops in France. It has never been translated into English.

=== 21st century ===
In 2006, Interior Minister and former President of the Republic Nicolas Sarkozy was accused of interfering in the management of Paris Match after it published photos of Cécilia Sarkozy with another man in New York. The firing of the Paris Match director by Hachette Filipacchi Médias coincided with several other instances of self-censorship in French media.

In April 2013 a volunteer with administrator's access to the French language Wikipedia was summoned by the direction centrale du Renseignement intérieur (Central Directorate of Homeland Intelligence, DCRI), a division of France's interior ministry. The volunteer was ordered to take down an article that had been online since 2009 concerning a military radio relay station at Pierre-sur Haute. DCRI claimed the article contained classified military information, for reasons that to date remain unclear, and broke French law. The volunteer, who had no connection with the article, explained "that's not how Wikipedia works" and told them he had no right to interfere with editorial content, but was told he would be held in custody and charged if he failed to comply. The article was promptly restored by a Swiss Wikipedia contributor. Christophe Henner, vice-president of Wikimedia France, said "if the DCRI comes up with the necessary legal papers we will take down the page. We have absolutely no problem with that and have made it a point of honour to respect legal injunctions; it's the method the DCRI used that is shocking."

On 15 December 2017, France's Constitutional Court rejected a bill to make visiting terrorist websites a criminal offence, citing "inviolability of freedom of communication and expression" as a reason.

In 2024, the sui generis collectivity of France, New Caledonia in the Pacific (also part of EEA) banned TikTok, after riots, and also banned public gatherings.

== Political speech ==
Individuals in these cases have been prosecuted for expressing political agreement or disagreement in a particular manner.

- In 2008, left wing activist Herve Eon was convicted for a sign he had made and given a €30 fine. The sign, which was held near the car of former President Nicolas Sarkozy, read "get lost jerk", echoing a statement Sarkozy himself had made to a critic at a public event. In 2013, the European Court of Human Rights overturned the ruling and criticized the French decision, stating the remark was protected for being satirical.
- In 2013 Laure Pora, the head of a Paris chapter of LGBT rights group ACT UP, counter-protested at a rally against abortion. She called the President of an opposing group a "homophobe" and had activists distribute fliers with this message. In 2016, judges convicted Pora of a hate crime and fined her €2,300, ruling that "homophobe" was a slur in violation of French law. This conviction was however definitely cancelled by the Court of Cassation in January 2018: the Court found that Pora's words were within the acceptable limits of freedom of speech.
- In 2015, France upheld twelve convictions which prosecuted BDS activists for selling T-shirts which read "Long live Palestine, boycott Israel". This ruling was overturned by the European Court of Human Rights in 2020.

== Linguistic censorship ==
The Toubon law enacted in 1994 has the cultural goal of "reaffirming the position of the French language". It requires "the compulsory use of the French language in all [public] written, ...radio and television advertising..." As a direct consequence, advertising industry workers in France have expressed "frustration with regards to what many of them perceive as linguistic censorship." Computer software developed outside France has to have its user interface and instruction manuals translated into French to be legally used by companies in France, due to the provision of the Toubon law applying to all workplaces that "any document that contains obligations for the employee or provisions whose knowledge is necessary for the performance of one's work must be written in French." Also under this law, French language is required in all audiovisual programs, with exceptions for musical works and 'original version' films. Under a related law for television, a minimum of 60 per cent of the movies and TV series must be produced in European countries and 40 per cent in Francophone countries, and these minimums must be met during evening prime-time as well as daily overall time. The latter law is not linguistic censorship because it applies to television programs that are dubbed into French; rather it is a restriction of foreign-produced cultural content. In another law that involves censorship of both linguistic and foreign-produced content, songs in the French language on radio are protected by a minimum quota system.

== Press ==
The press is largely unrestricted by law in France, although indirect pressures are sometimes applied to prevent publication of materials against the interests of the government or influential industries. Involvement of the government and major industrial groups, sometimes with political ties, with certain press organizations sometimes raises questions as to the ability of the press to remain truly independent and unrestricted. Examples include:

- the Agence France-Presse (AFP), an internationally active news agency used by the media worldwide, is a public corporation nominally independent from the government, but derives a lot of its revenue from sales to government;
- Radio France International (RFI) is funded by the Minister of Foreign Affairs, and is sometimes criticized for its cover of former French colonies
- Serge Dassault, businessman involved in warplanes, and thus in government procurement contracts, (see Dassault Aviation) and senator from the UMP party, owns newspapers including Le Figaro; he famously indicated that he intended his papers to reflect only "healthy ideas" (idées saines) and that left-wing ideas were unhealthy;
- the Bouygues group, a major operator of public works and thus of government procurement contracts, owns the TF1 TV channel, which has the largest audience. Specifically, the talk-show Droit de réponse (Right to reply), shown on prime-time Saturday evening by Michel Polac, was suppressed after criticizing the bridge of Ré Island built by Bouygues.

In addition, most of the press depends on advertisement to generate revenue; the question of independence from advertisers is a constant and contentious one, with repeat assertions that undesirable investigations were taken away from TV broadcasts.

However, there are examples of independence of the press, including the Canard enchaîné, a newspaper that is known for its scoops and publication thereof, even against the will of the government. In order to remain independent, the Canard does not accept advertising.

Human rights defenders were alarmed regarding France's lower house of parliament debating a controversial bill advocated by President Macron's party, and say the measure would hurt press freedoms and will result in "massive" self-censorship.

== Theatre ==
Victor Hugo's 1832 play Le roi s'amuse was banned after one performance. Though it depicts the escapades of Francis I of France, censors of the time believed that it also contained insulting references to King Louis-Philippe. Hugo brought a suit to permit the performance of the play, which he lost but it propelled him into celebrity as a defender of freedom of speech.

== Cinema ==
All films intended for theatrical release have to be granted a visa by the Ministry of Culture, upon the recommendation of Commission for film classification (Commission de classification cinématographique), which can give a film one of five ratings:

- Tous publics (universal/U): suitable for all audiences
- Avertissement (!): some scenes may disturb young viewers. Can be used in conjunction with any rating as a warning.
- Interdit aux moins de 12 ans (-12): Forbidden for under 12s
- Interdit aux moins de 16 ans (-16): Forbidden for under 16s
- Interdit aux moins de 18 ans (-18): Forbidden for under 18s but not pornographic. Usually used for movies containing unsimulated sex (e.g. Ken Park in 2003) or extreme violence/cruelty (e.g. 1971's A Clockwork Orange)
- Interdit aux moins de 18 ans classé X (-18 or X): Forbidden for under 18s and pornographic. This is not a rating per se and it is equivalent to the American "unrated" rank as such films are not played in movie theaters.

Cinemas are bound by law to prevent underaged audiences from viewing films and may be fined if they fail to do so.

The Commission cannot make cuts to a film, but it can ban it, although this latter power is rarely used. In practice, this means that most films in France are categorized rather than censored.

Although there are no written guidelines as to what sort of content should receive which rating and ratings are given on a case-by-case basis, the commissioners typically cite violent, sexual and drug related content (especially if it is deemed to be graphic or gratuitous) as reasons for higher ratings. By contrast little attention is paid to strong language. However sexual content is much less likely to produce a high rating than in many other countries, including the United States.

Films that have received mild ratings in France compared to the U.S. include:

- American Beauty, U (rated R in the US)
- Fat Girl, -12 (unrated in the US)
- Borat: Cultural Learnings of America for Make Benefit Glorious Nation of Kazakhstan, U (rated R in US)
- Eyes Wide Shut, U! reclassified to U (rated R in US)
- Kids, -12 (originally rated NC-17 in the US)
- Taxi Driver, -16, reclassified to -12
- Braveheart, U! reclassified to U (rated R in US)
- The Exorcist, -16, reclassified to -12
- Van Helsing, U, (rated PG-13 in the US)
- Showgirls, -12 (rated NC-17 in US)
- Shame (2011 film), -12 (rated NC-17 in US)
- Killer Joe (film), -12 (rated NC-17 in US)
- Blue Valentine (film), U (originally rated NC-17 in US, appealed to an R rating)
- The Royal Tenenbaums, U (rated R in US)
- Kick-Ass, U! (rated R in US)
- Team America: World Police (cut version), U! (rated R in US)
- Man Bites Dog, -12 (rated NC-17 in US)
- Mulholland Drive, U (rated R in US)
- Inland Empire, U (rated R in US)
- Baise-Moi, -16, reclassified to -18 (unrated in US)
- Fifty Shades of Grey, -12 (rated R in US)
- The Lobster, U! (rated R in US)
- Sausage Party, -12 (rated R in US)
- Parasite (2019 film), U! (rated R in US)
- Blue is the Warmest Colour, -12! (rated NC-17 in US)
- Spy × Family Code: White, U (rated PG-13 in US)
- F1 (film), U (rated PG-13 in US)
- Delicatessen, U (Rated R in US)
- Amélie, U (Rated R in US)

== Television ==
The Regulatory Authority for Audiovisual and Digital Communication (ARCOM, the new CSA) leaves the TV channels the choice of classification of a program, but can impose penalties if the classification is too low.

There are five classifications for television programs:

- Tous publics (universal/U): suitable for all audiences
- Déconseillé aux moins de 10 ans (-10): Not recommended for anyone under 10s (excluded from shows for children)
- Déconseillé aux moins de 12 ans (-12): Not recommended for anyone under 12s (broadcast mostly after 10:00pm but occasionally after 8:30pm)
- Déconseillé aux moins de 16 ans (-16): Not recommended for anyone under 16s (broadcast after 10:30pm)
- Interdit aux moins de 18 ans (-18): Forbidden to anyone under 18s (broadcast between 0:00am and 5:00am only on the pay-per-view channels)

Classification of films can vary between the theatrical release and television broadcast. For example, Zombieland has been classified "Tous publics" in cinema, but when it was broadcast on TV, it was classified -16. The CSA is quite permissive about offensive language and sex in relation to the United States and in the United Kingdom. For example, South Park can be broadcast at any time of the day, except adjacent to youth programming, because it is classified -10. Note that cinema-only and VOD channels have different rules.

=== Classification details ===
Classification is made by the channels through a "viewing committee" which uses some guidelines proposed by the Regulatory Authority for Audiovisual and Digital Communication (ARCOM) to decide of a classification. The ARCOM exerts control at the time of broadcasting, not before, and can investigate further either after a viewer's complaint or on its own behalf. Sanctions from the ARCOM can range from a simple warning to a broadcasting ban.

Some of the questions that the ARCOM want to be asked by viewing committees when evaluating a show are the following. For a series, each episode is evaluated.

- The number and nature of the violent scenes
- Are the violent scenes gratuitous or important for the scenario?
- Are women depicted in a respectful or disrespectful way?
- Is sex being depicted? And how could young viewers react to such scenes?

== List of censored books ==
- Lamennais, Le Pays et le gouvernement (1840, led to Lammennais' imprisonment for a year)
- Henri Alleg, La Question (Minuit, 1958 — on the use of torture during the Algerian War)
- Frantz Fanon's The Wretched of the Earth (1961), with a preface from Jean-Paul Sartre (published by François Maspero)
- Mongo Beti's Cruel hand on Cameroon, autopsy of a decolonization (Maspero, 1972) censored by the Ministry of the Interior Raymond Marcellin on the request, brought forward by Jacques Foccart, of the Cameroon government, represented in Paris by the ambassador Ferdinand Oyono.
- Bagatelles pour un massacre, by Louis-Ferdinand Céline, for antisemitism, just like by the same author:
  - L'Ecole des cadavres
  - Les Beaux draps
- Léon Degrelle's Tintin mon copain

== List of censored songs ==
- Boris Vian, Le Déserteur (1954)
- JoeyStarr, "Sarkozy" (2006)

== List of censored films ==
- La Garçonne (1923)
- Zéro de conduite (1933)
- Jean-Luc Godard, Le Petit Soldat (1960)
- Claude Autant-Lara, Thou Shalt Not Kill (1961) from 1961 to 1963
- Du - Zwischenzeichen der Sexualität (1968)
- Gillo Pontecorvo, The Battle of Algiers (1965)
- L'Essayeuse (1976)
- Le Mur (2011) Censored from 2012 to 2014.

== CSA ==
The Conseil Supérieur de l'Audiovisuel (CSA) is charged to regulate televisions, both public and private. It surveys the respect of national legislation, as well as the respect of time allocated to each political party in the media during electoral periods.

== Freedom of information ==
Freedom of information and the accountability of public servants is a constitutional right, according to the Declaration of the Rights of Man and of the Citizen.

The implementing freedom of information legislation is the Loi n°78-753 du 17 juillet 1978 portant diverses mesures d'amélioration des relations entre l'administration et le public et diverses dispositions d'ordre administratif, social et fiscal (Act No. 78-753 of 17 July 1978. On various measures for improved relations between the Civil Service and the public and on various arrangements of administrative, social and fiscal nature). It sets as a general rule that citizens can demand a copy of any administrative document (in paper, digitized or other form). The commission on access to administrative documents (Commission d'Accès aux Documents Administratifs, CADA), an independent administrative authority, may help in the process. Regulations specify maximal fees of reproduction. Only final versions, not work documents, may be requested. There exist a number of exemptions:

- Documents established in the process of justice.
- Documents of cases before the national ombudsman.
- Documents carrying an appreciation or judgment over a named or easily identifiable person, or containing private information of that person (such as medical records), when the person requesting the document is not the person described in the document or, in some cases, from his or her family; such documents may often still be obtained after the names of the persons involved are erased;
- Documents for which that are already available to the public (for instance, publishing in the Journal Officiel).
- Documents with secrets regarding national defense or national foreign policy (though they may often be communicated after erasure of certain passages).
- Internal deliberations of the national executive.
- Documents from fiscal, customs, criminal enquiries.

Certain exempted documents may still be available according to other statutes. For instance, some tax-related information about any taxpayer are available to any other taxpayer from the same tax district.

CADA does not have the power to order administrations to surrender documents, though it may strongly incite them to do so. However, citizens can challenge the refusal of the administration before the administrative courts (i.e. courts hearing recourses against the executive). Unfortunately, these courts are overbooked, and citizens must often wait several years to have their rights examined in a fair trial. France has been declared guilty of excessive delays (more than 10 years) many times by the European Court of Human Rights..

== See also ==
- Internet censorship in France
- Human rights in France
- Reporters Without Borders

== Works cited ==
- Pottinger, David Thomas (1958). The French Book Trade in the Ancien Régime, 1500-1791. Cambridge, Mass.: Harvard University Press. ISBN 9780674432581. OCLC 7385496598.
