= El Omaria =

Coordinates: 36°16′N 3°02′E

- Commune and town
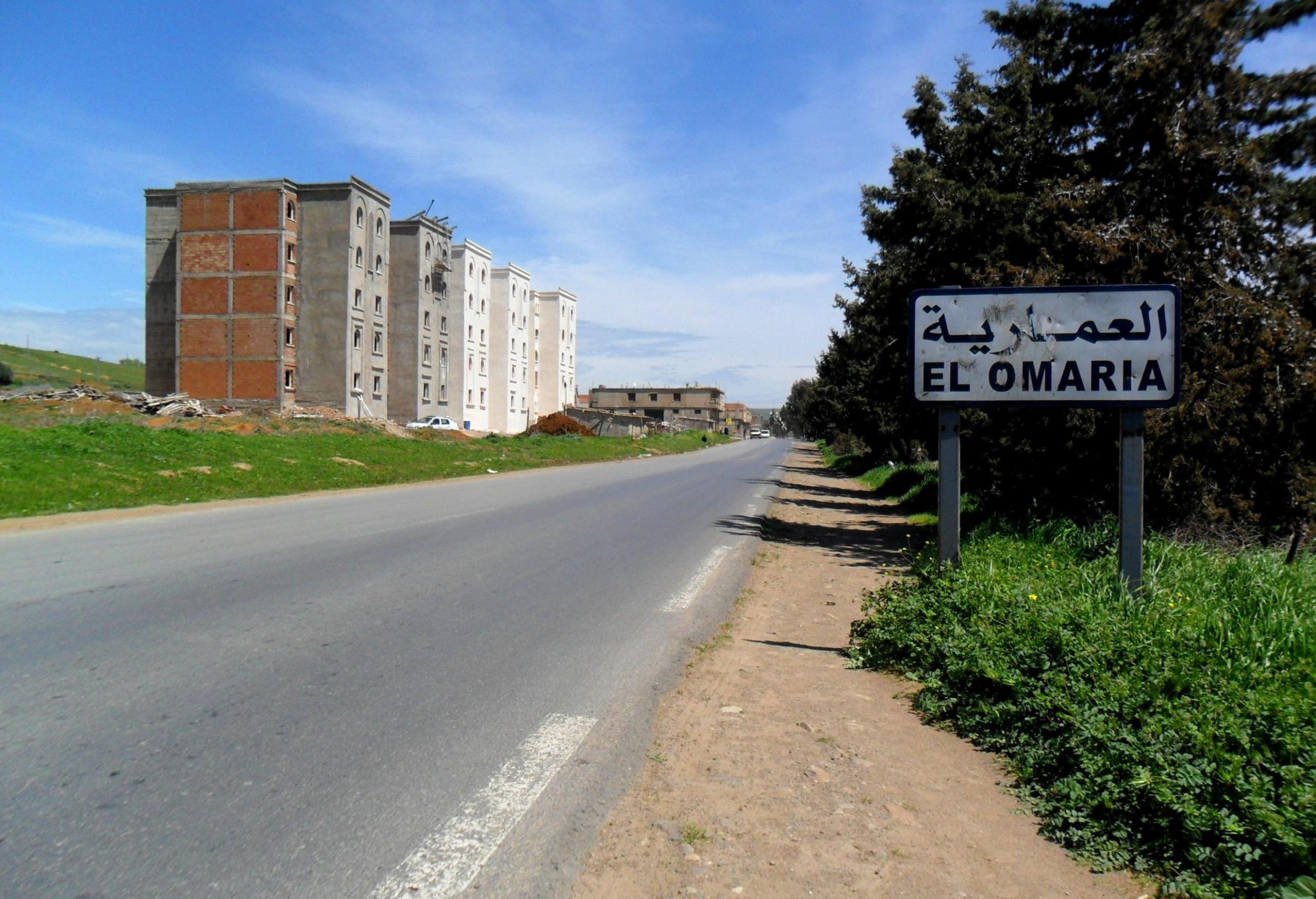
- Interactive map of El Omaria
- Country: Algeria
- Province: Médéa Province

Population (1998)
  - Total: 17,661
- Time zone: UTC+1 (CET)

El Omaria is a town and commune in Médéa Province, Algeria. According to the 1998 census, it has a population of 17,661.
