= Fanfare du 27e Bataillon de Chasseurs Alpin =

French military band

Band of the 27th Alpine Chasseurs Battalion
- Fanfare du 27e Bataillon de Chasseurs Alpin
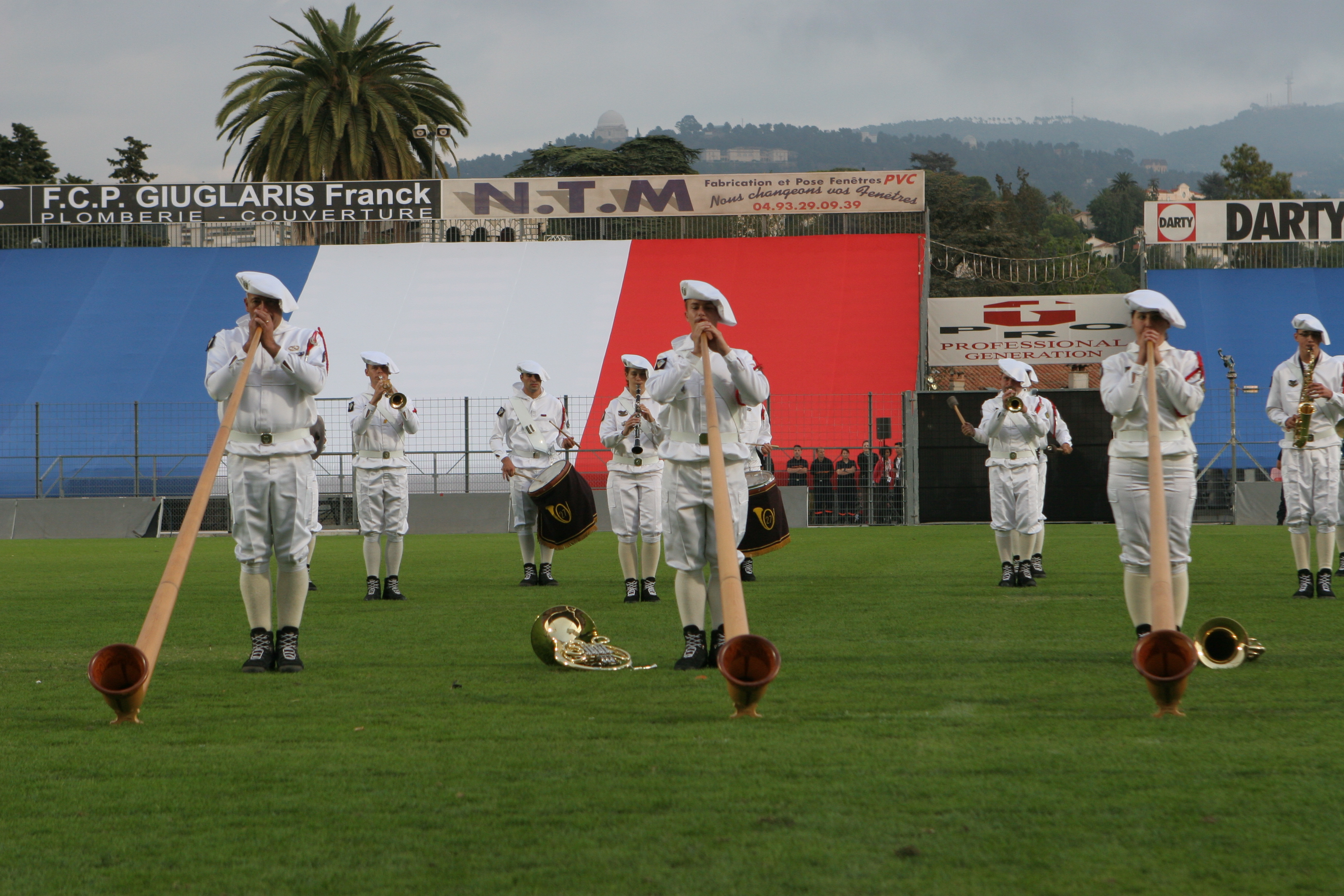
- The Fanfare du 27e BCA at a military tattoo in Nice.
- Active: 1871–present
- Country: France
- Branch: French Army
- Type: Musical unit
- Size: 18 musicians
- Part of: 27e bataillon de chasseurs alpins
- Garrison/HQ: Annecy
- Nickname: Fanfare du 27e BCA

Commanders
- Current commander: Chief Warrant Officer Paul-Philippe Neyrac (since July 2017)
- Notable commanders: Warrant Officer Eric Moron (1996–2017)

The Fanfare du 27e Bataillon de Chasseurs Alpin is a military band unit of the French Army. The band is attached the 27e bataillon de chasseurs alpins (27th BCA) and effectively serves as the regimental band of the Chasseurs Alpins, being that it is the single and last fanfare band of the regiment as well as this combat arm of the Army.

== Brief description ==
The band incorporates as part of its instrumentation the Alphorn, a traditional instrument of the Alpine hill and mountain villages of Savoy, which has been able to attract the public's favor and which allows to complete the extent of its musical repertoire. The Alphorn is the ancestor of the big family of musical horns and historically has been used by sheepherders to aide in herd recall in the French Alps. In wartime, it is also has been used to signal the arrival of invading forces to the region. Today the band can be distinguished by its small size (18 musicians) as compared to the other bands of the armed forces, as well as its gender diversity, with females making up more than 30% of its ranks. Since December 2016, the band has explored creating a big band ensemble in its structure.

=== Performance schedule/history ===
Beginning in February every year, the band begins to develop its performance schedule for various events around the country. In many cases, the participation in events mostly revolves around parades and ceremonies as there are not many military tattoo in France. On Bastille Day in 2012, the band had the honor to perform on the Champs-Élysées alongside the French Foreign Legion Music Band (MLE) during the annual military parade. This was the second time that the band has done this, with the first time being in 2005. Outside of the French Republic, the band takes part in military tattoos around the world, mainly travelling to countries within the European Union and NATO. The band represented the French Army in the Quebec City International Festival of Military Bands in 2013.

== Traditions ==
=== Marching pace ===
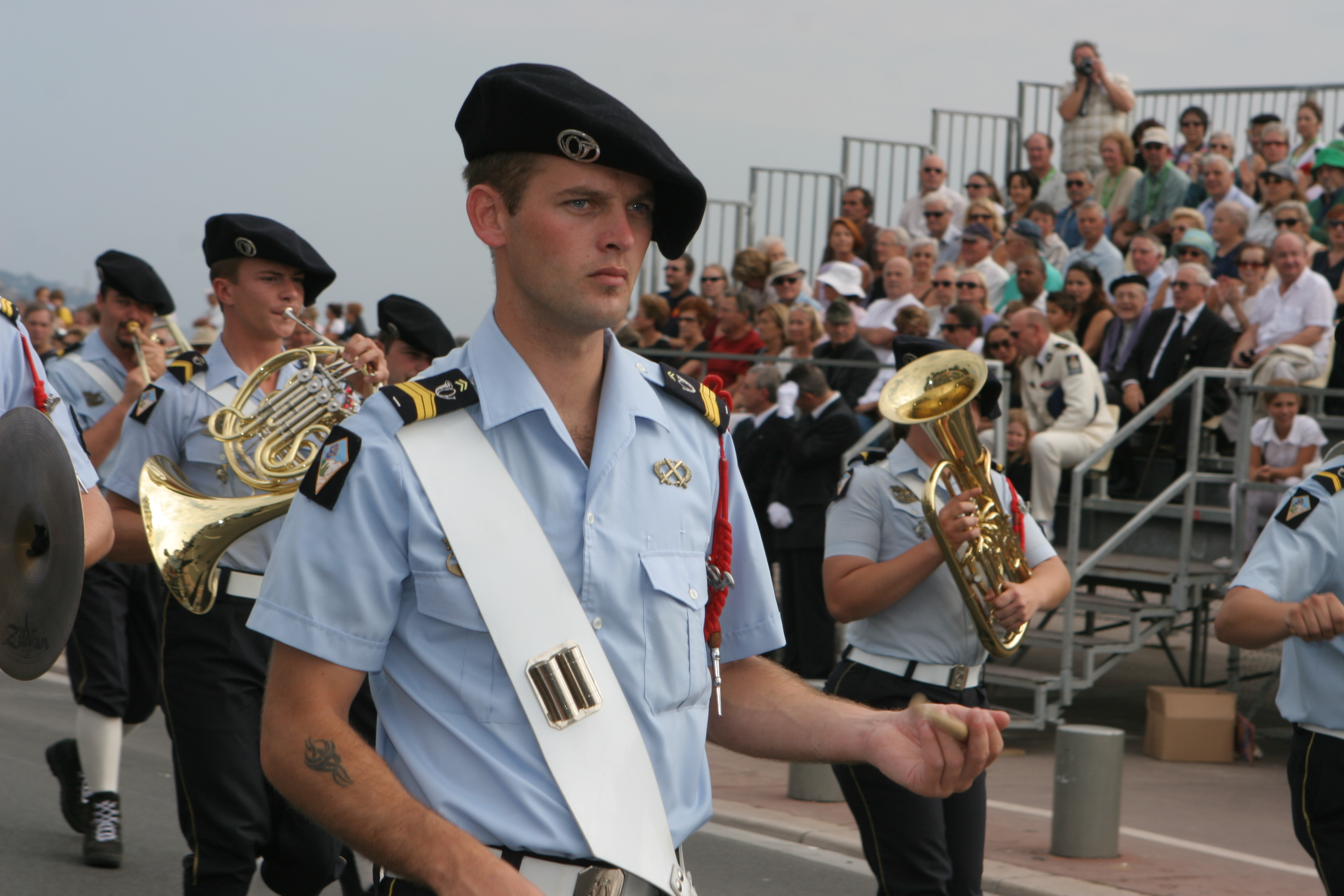

When Chasseurs Alpins are marching with the band and horns, the marching pace is 140 steps a minute – faster than most other armed forces units, with the exception of the Italian Bersaglieri, whose pace, as well as of its bands, is 180 steps per minute in double time. This tradition has been in place ever since it was restored in 2004.

=== Terms ===
Like the rest of the regiment, the band has a few terms which they say differently from other army bands.

- not uniforme (uniform), but tenue (outfit, or dress), like in the Royale
- la fanfare instead of la musique
- sonne instead of joue
- caisse claire instead of tambour
