= 27e bataillon de chasseurs alpins =

27^{e} Bataillon de Chasseurs Alpins
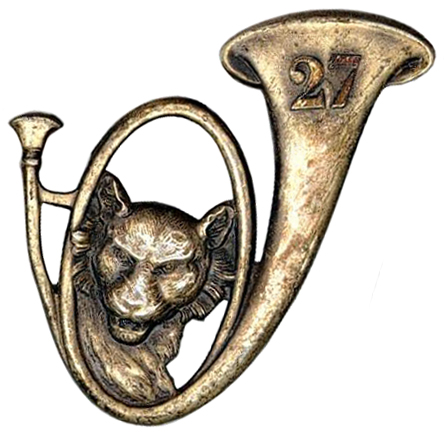
- Insigne of the battalion
- Active: 30 January 1871–present
- Country: France
- Branch: French Army
- Type: Mountain Infantry
- Size: 1,100 men and women
- Part of: 27th Mountain Infantry Brigade, 1st Armored Division
- Garrison/HQ: Cran-Gevrier, France
- Mottos: "Vivre libre ou mourir" ("Live free or die") "Toujours à l'affût" ("Always on the lookout")
- Engagements: World War I World War II: Battles of Narvik; Battle of France; Algerian War; War in Afghanistan (2001–2021): Battle of Alasay

Commanders
- Current commander: Colonel Morel
- Notable commanders: Jean Vallette d'Osia; Yves Godard; Nicolas Le Nen

The 27^{e} bataillon de chasseurs alpins (27^{e} BCA) is a Chasseurs alpins battalion of the French Army. It is a heavily decorated unit, whose members wear the fourragère of the Legion of Honour.

== Organisation ==
The 27^{e} BCA operated under the 27th Mountain Infantry Brigade, which specialises in combat in extreme conditions, both in mountain and urban zones.

The 27^{e} BCA comprises

- 6 combat companies, including one reserve intervention unit
- Support Company
- Command and Logistics Company
- Administration and Support Unit
- Fanfare du 27e Bataillon de Chasseurs Alpin

== History ==
The 27^{e} BCA was created at 1871 Rochefort on January 30, 1871. It was one of seven chasseurs à pied (light infantry) battalions created that year, in the aftermath of the Franco-Prussian War. From 1889 it was designated as an alpine unit (chasseurs alpins).

The battalion distinguished itself during the First World War, earning 8 mentions in despatches and the fourragère of the Legion of Honour. The battalion lost 1,822 men during the war and was commended by prime minister Georges Clemenceau who gave the unit the nickname of "tigers", reflected on their insignia.

Since 1922 it has based in Annecy, Haute-Savoie.

During the Second World War, it notably took part in the Battles of Narvik. After it was disbanded after Case Anton, some of its elements trained the Maquis des Glières; in subsequent combat against SS units the Battalion gained the motto of Vivre libre ou mourir ("live free, or die"). Some 129 men of the unit died in the war.

It took part in the Algerian War, in Kabily, until 1962.

From November 2008 to June 2009 the 27^{e} BCA has been engaged in Afghanistan, notably taking part in the Battle of Alasay. The unit returned to Afghanistan in November 2011, serving in the Kapisa valley and receiving a second citation at the army level and a rare second fourragère. In February 2022 the unit was deployed to Romania.

== Commander ==
- Major Fauquignon (1871–1874)
- Major Michaud (1874–1878)
- Major Obry (1878–1880)
- Major Malaper (1880–1883)
- Major Dechizelle (1883–1892)
- Major Baugillot (1892–1901)
- Major Marjoulet (1901–1910)
- Major Eychnene (1911–1914)
- Major Renie (August 1914)
- Major Stirn (June 1915 – February 1916)
- Major Demain (March – August 1916)
- Major de Galbert (August – September 1916)
- Major Pigeaud (October – November 1916)
- Major Richier (December 1916 – September 1918)
- Major Tessier (September – October 1918)
- Major Croisset (November 1918 – October 1920)
- Major Montalegre (October 1920)
- Major Petitpas (August 1921 – September 1922)
- Major Michal (September 1922 – September 1926)
- Major Agliany (September 1926 – October 1928)
- Major Bonnet de la Tour (October 1928 – July 1930)
- Major Vinot (July 1930 – January 1934)
- Major Molle (January 1934 – April 1936)
- Major Chomel de Jarnieu (April 1936 – September 1938)
- Major Mazaud (September 1938 – July 1940)
- Major Jean Vallette d'Osia (August 1940 – February 1942)
- Major Schumeckel (March – November 1942)
- Major Yves Godard (December 1944 – February 1946)
- Major Ponvienne (February 1946 – October 1947)
- Major Juille (October 1947 – October 1949)
- Major Bourdel (October 1949 – April 1951)
- Major Flotard (April 1951 – October 1953)
- Major Baillis (October 1953 – September 1955)
- Major Pascal (September 1955 – September 1957)
- Major Martinerie (September 1957 – August 1959)
- Major Claude Vanbremeerch (August 1959 – June 1961)
- Major Saulnier (June 1961 – February 1963)
- Major Civet (February 1963 – December 1963)
- Major Klasser (December 1963 – September 1965)
- Major Curtet (September 1965 – September 1967)
- Lieutenant Colonel Neyton (September 1967 – October 1969)
- Lieutenant Colonel Bernard-Maugiron (October 1969 – September 1971)
- Lieutenant Colonel Motte (September 1971 – September 1973)
- Lieutenant Colonel Legros (September 1973 – August 1975)
- Lieutenant Colonel Lafont (August 1975 – September 1977)
- Lieutenant Colonel de Peyrelongue (September 1977 – August 1979)
- Lieutenant Colonel Pichot-Duclos (August 1979 – September 1981)
- Lieutenant Colonel Miray (September 1981 – September 1983)
- Colonel de Metz (September 1983 – August 1985)
- Colonel Glevarec (August 1985 – August 1987)
- Colonel Bachelet (August 1987 – September 1989)
- Colonel Barrie (September 1989 – August 1991)
- Colonel Sublet (August 1991 – August 1993)
- Colonel Ratel (August 1993 – August 1995)
- Colonel Bertucchi (August 1995 – August 1997)
- Colonel de Lardemelle (August 1997 – August 1999)
- Colonel Recule (August 1999 – August 2001)
- Colonel Berne (August 2001 – August 2003)
- Colonel Palasset (August 2003 – August 2005)
- Colonel Houssay (August 2005 – August 2007)
- Colonel Nicolas Le Nen (August 2007 – August 2009)
- Colonel Pierre-Joseph Givre (August 2009 – )
