= Groupement tactique interarmes de Kapisa =

French Army unit

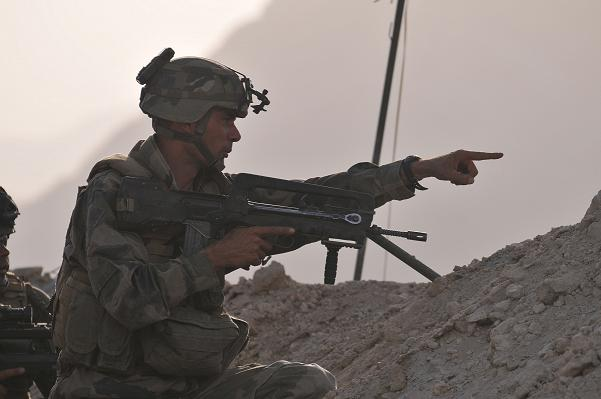
A member of marine troops (marsouin) pointing to guerrilla positions on 13 August 2009

The Groupement tactique interarmes de Kapisa (GTIA Kapisa, "joint tactical group of Kapisa"), also called Task Force Korrigan, was a battalion-sized unit of the French Army, based in Kapisa Province, in Afghanistan. It operated in the framework of the French forces in Afghanistan.

== Structure ==
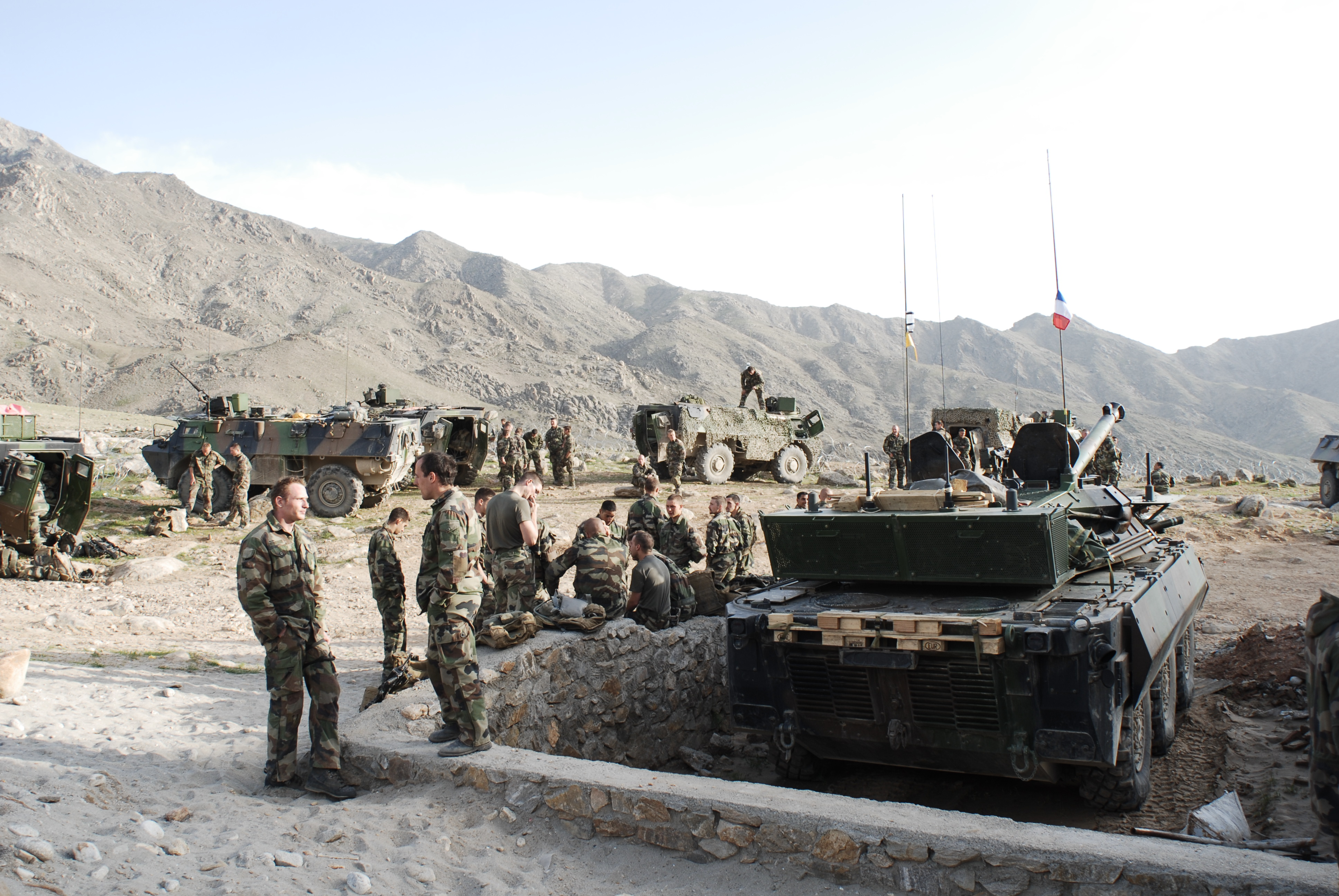
French troops and armor in the Alasai Valley, April 2009.

GTIA Kapisa comprises

- a command component
- a support component
- two armoured infantry sub-groups

The support unit provides fire support, engineering, communications, maintenance and medical support.

The GTIA Kapisa operated under the Regional Command East headed by US general Curtis Scaparrotti. The other units of the French Army in Afghanistan operate under Regional Command Capital headed by French general Michel Stollsteiner.

From 15 June 2009, GTIA Kapisa has been constituted of the 3rd Marine Infantry Regiment (3rd RIMa), complemented with an armoured unit of the 1st Marine Infantry Regiment (1st RIMa), two engineering sections of the 6th Engineer Regiment (6th RG), two mortar sections of the 11th Marine Artillery Regiment (11th RAMa), and a communication group for the 48th RT. This amounts to 650 personnel.

The headquarters and one of the combat groups are positioned at Nijrab, while the other combat unit is based in Tagab.

On 1 November 2009, command of the GTIA was transferred to the Brigade La Fayette.

== History ==
The foundation of the GTIA-Kapisa was announced by President Sarkozy on 3 April 2008, during the NATO summit in Bucarest.

=== Task Force Chimera, August 2008 to January 2009 ===
From August 2008 - January 2009, the GTIA-Kapisa was dubbed "Task Force Chimera". It comprised elements of

- the 8th Marine Infantry Parachute Regiment (8e RPIMa)
- the 35th Parachute Artillery Regiment (35e RAP)
- the 17th Parachute Engineer Regiment (17e RGP)

A company detached from the 8e RPIMa to the BatFra, and sustained casualties, 10 killed & 21 wounded, during the Uzbin Valley ambush on 18 August 2008.

Task Force Chimera sustained 15 wounded during its tour besides the 10 killed & 21 wounded, during the Uzbin Valley ambush on 18 August 2008.

=== Task Force Tiger, January 2009 to 15 June 2009 ===
From January 2009 to 15 June 2009, the GTIA-Kapisa was dubbed "Task Force Tiger", under Colonel Nicolas Le Nen. It comprised elements of

- the 27th Mountain Infantry Battalion (27e BCA)
- the 2nd Foreign Engineer Regiment (2e REG)
- the 4th Chasseurs, providing an armoured arm with five AMX-10 RC (4e RCh)
- the 93rd Mountain Artillery Regiment (93e RAM).

One of the most notable operations was the Battle of Alasay, on 14 March 2009.

Task Force Tiger sustained one dead (Corporal Nicolas Belda, killed during the Battle of Alasay), and one wounded.

=== Task Force Korrigan, 15 June 2009 to 15 January 2010 ===
From 15 June 2009 to 15 January 2010, the GTIA-Kapisa is dubbed "Task Force Korrigan", under colonel Chanson. It comprised

- a section of the 3rd Marine Infantry Regiment (3e RIMa)
- a section of the 6th Engineer Regiment (6e RG)
- two mortar sections from the 11e RAMa
- one group of the 48e RT
- one armoured platoon of the 1st Marine Infantry Regiment (1e RIMa)

In June, the French troops received reinforcements with eight CAESAR self-propelled howitzers.

As of 1 November 2009, Task Force Korrigan had lost 7 killed and 44 wounded.

== See also ==
- Groupement tactique interarmes de Surobi
