= Paul Aussaresses =

French general

- Général Paul Aussaresses
- Born: 7 November 1918; Saint-Paul-Cap-de-Joux, France
- Died: 3 December 2013 (aged 95); Sainte-Marie-aux-Mines, France
- Military career
- Allegiance: France
- Branch: French Army
- Service years: 1941–1975
- Rank: Brigadier General
- Commands: 11e Choc; 1er RCP
- Conflicts: World War II; First Indochina War; Algerian War

Paul Aussaresses (French: [pɔl osaʁɛs]; 7 November 1918 – 3 December 2013) was a French Army general, who fought during World War II, the First Indochina War and Algerian War. His actions during the Algerian War—and later defense of those actions—caused considerable controversy.

Aussaresses joined the Free French Forces in North Africa during the Second World War. In 1947 he was given command of the 11th Shock Battalion, a commando unit that was part of France's former external intelligence agency, the External Documentation and Counter-Espionage Service, the SDECE (replaced by the Direction Générale de la Sécurité Extérieure (DGSE)).

Aussaresses provoked controversy in 2000 when, in an interview with the French newspaper Le Monde, he admitted and defended the use of torture during the Algerian war. He repeated the defense in an interview with CBS's 60 Minutes, further arguing that torture ought to be used in the fight against Al-Qaeda, and again defended his use of torture during the Algerian War in a 2001 book; The Battle of the Casbah. In the aftermath of the controversy, he was stripped of his rank, the right to wear his army uniform and his Légion d'Honneur. A 2003 documentary revealed that, after moving to Brazil in 1973, Aussaresses had advised South American dictators on the use of torture widely used against leftist opponents to the military regimes in Argentina, Bolivia, Brazil, Chile, Paraguay, and Uruguay. Aussaresses also admitted to advising the CIA for the Americans' Vietnam era Phoenix Program, which utilized torture.

Aussaresses, recognizable by his eye patch, lost his left eye due to a botched cataract operation.

== Biography ==
=== Early life and military career ===
Aussaresses was born on 7 November 1918, just four days before the end of World War I, in Saint-Paul-Cap-de-Joux, Tarn department, in Languedoc. His father, Paul Aussaresses senior, was serving in the French military at the time of his son's birth because of the war.

In 1941, Aussaresses served a year as an officer cadet in Cherchell, Algeria. The next year, in 1942, he volunteered for the special services unit in France. He a member of a Jedburgh team and member of Team CHRYSLER which parachuted into France behind the German lines in August 1944. The Jedburghs worked clandestinely behind enemy lines to harness the local resistance and coordinate their activities with the wishes of the Allied Commanders. CHRYSLER deployed from Algeria via an American aircraft to work with the local French Resistance in Ariège. On 1 September 1946 he joined the 11th Choc Battalion and commanded the battalion from 1947 until 1948, when he was replaced by Yves Godard. Later, he served in the First Indochina War with the 1st Parachute Chasseur Regiment.

=== Philippeville ===
In 1955 he was transferred to Philippeville, on the north-eastern coastline of Algeria, to be part of the 41st Parachute Demi-Brigade as an intelligence officer. He restarted his demi-brigade's intelligence unit, which had been disbanded during peacetime but was deemed necessary by the French Army, which wanted to quell the insurgency of the Algerian rebels. On 20 August 1955 the FLN (Algerian National Liberation Front) staged an attack against the police of Philippeville. Aussaresses states that he had information about this attack well beforehand and was therefore able to prevent much bloodshed. The members of the FLN had forced many of the men, women and children of the countryside to march in front of them, without weapons, as human shields. Aussaresses reports that his battalion killed 134 of these men, women and children, and that hundreds more had been wounded. He reports that two men from his own side also died, and that around one hundred others had been wounded. (Aussaresses, p. 41)

=== The Suez Operation ===
In the spring of 1956, he attended a top-secret training camp in Salisbury, England, for a one-month training to prepare for the battle at Suez Canal. He returned to Bône, Algeria, in May 1956 to continue exercises with paratroopers on their way to the Suez Canal. On 1 June 1956 he received a spinal fracture from a parachuting exercise, which prevented him from participating in the Suez operation.

=== Working with Massu in Algiers ===
General Jacques Massu, who had noted Aussaresses' work against the insurrections in Philippeville, ordered Aussaresses to work under him in Algiers as an agent to control the FLN in Algiers. Aussaresses reported for duty in Algiers on 8 January 1957. He was the main executioner and intelligence collector under Jacques Massu during the Battle of Algiers. On 28 January, he broke a citywide strike organized by the FLN using repressive measures. Soldiers forcibly dragged all public utilities workers to their jobs. Store fronts were torn open so that the owners had to open the store for fear of being looted. Later in 1957, he ordered his men to hang Larbi Ben M'Hidi, an important member of the FLN, as if he had committed suicide. In a separate incident he ordered that an officer throw Ali Boumendjel, an influential Algerian attorney, from the 6th floor of the building he was held prisoner in, claiming that Boumendjel had committed suicide. France decreed that both deaths were suicides, but Aussaresses admitted both assassinations in 2000.

=== Status of torture in the French government ===
Aussaresses contends, in his book, that the French government insisted that the military in Algeria "liquidate the FLN as quickly as possible".

Subsequently, historians debated whether or not this repression had been government-backed. The French government has always claimed that it was not, but Aussaresses argues that the government insisted upon the harsh measures he took against Algerians - measures which included summary executions of many people, hours of torture of prisoners, and violent strike-breaking.

Aussaresses was quite candid in his interview in Le Monde forty years later (May 3, 2001):

Concerning the use of torture, it was tolerated, if not recommended. François Mitterrand, the Minister for Justice, had, indeed, an emissary with Massu in judge Jean Bérard, who covered for us and who had complete knowledge of what went on in the night.

Aussaresses justified the use of torture by saying how shocked he was by the FLN's massacre at the El Halia mine. He suggested that torture was a small but necessary evil that had to be used to defeat a much larger evil of terrorism. Aussaresses also claimed that he used these methods because it was a quick way to obtain information. He also defended its use by saying that the legal system was meant to deal with a peacetime France, not a counter insurgency war that the French army was faced with in Algeria. In 2001, Aussaresses during an interview stated:

The FLN were involved in a savage terrorist movement. My role in Algeria was a struggle against unbridled terrorism — blind attacks against the innocent. The conflict was not Algerians vs. French. The fight was not a political one nor was it an ideological one. That holds no interest for me. Most Algerians, as well, were not interested in political problems. They only wanted to be able to go out on the streets and live in peace. I, who judge no one … often ask, considering what happens in a city today — with those blind attacks which decimate the innocent — why someone does not understand within a few weeks that the high authorities must utilize all means in order to put an end to the terror?...I am a patriot. I take full responsibility for my actions. I do not seek to justify my actions but simply try to explain that from the moment when a nation demands of its army to fight an enemy that terrorizes the population and forces it into submission, it is impossible for the army not to resort to extreme means....In the interest of my country I had clandestinely carried out operations unacceptable to the ordinary moral standards, had often circumvented the law: stolen, assassinated, vandalized, and terrorized. I had learned how to pick locks, kill without leaving traces, lie, be indifferent to my suffering and to that of others, had forgotten and made others forget. All for France.

In an interview to Marie-Monique Robin, Aussaresses described the methods used, including the creation of death squads (escadrons de la mort), the term being created at this time.

=== Trial ===
Following Aussaresses' revelations, which suggested that torture had been ordered by the highest levels of the French state hierarchy, Human Rights Watch sent a letter to President Jacques Chirac (RPR) to indict Aussaresses for war crimes, declaring that, despite past amnesties, such crimes, which may also have been crimes against humanity, may not be amnestied. The Ligue des droits de l'homme (LDH, Human Rights League) filed a complaint against him for "apology of war crimes," as Paul Aussaresses justified the use of torture, claiming it had saved lives following the Necessity Defense [AKA: Choice of Evils] and/or the Self-Defense (although he did not explicitly use this expression). He was condemned to a 7,500 Euros fine by the Tribunal de grande instance de Paris, while Plon and Perrin, two editing houses who had published his book in which he defended the use of torture, were sentenced each to a 15,000 Euros fine. The judgement was confirmed by the Court of Appeal in April 2003. The Court of Cassation rejected the intercession in December 2004. The Court of Cassation declared in its judgment that "freedom to inform, which is the basis of freedom of expression" does not lead to "accompany the exposure of facts ... with commentaries justifying acts contrary to human dignity and universally reproved," "nor to glorify its author." Aussaresses had written in his book: "torture became necessary when emergency imposed itself."

=== After Algeria ===
Aussaresses had a successful military career after the war. Unlike many of his fellow officers, he did not choose to join the OAS militant group to continue the fight in Algeria after the French military began to withdraw their forces. In 1961 he was appointed as a military attaché of the French diplomatic mission in the US, along with ten veterans of the Algerian War formerly under his charge. In the US, he also served at Fort Bragg, North Carolina, USA, alongside the 10th Special Forces Group, a military unit that specialized in tactics of unconventional warfare. There he taught the lessons of the Battle of Algiers, which allegedly included counter-insurgency tactics, interrogation, and torture.

According to Aussauresses, he specifically taught lessons from Colonel Trinquier's book on "subversive warfare" (Aussaresses had served under Trinquier in Algeria). The Americans' Vietnam era Phoenix Program, which utilized torture (including electric torture, simulated drowning, and rape) against those suspected of Viet Cong membership, was inspired by these American students of Aussaresses, after they had sent a copy of Trinquier's book to CIA agent Robert Komer. U.S. Army Colonel Carl Bernard later recalled that "starting with that book [Modern Warfare] Project Phoenix was conceived". However, Robert L. Miller, in a foreword to Aussaresses' later book, has stated that American officers actually rejected Aussaresses' instructions that torture and summary execution were useful in defeating insurgencies.

Aussaresses located to Brazil in 1973 during the military dictatorship, where he maintained very close links with the military. According to General Manuel Contreras, former head of the Chilean DINA, Chilean officers trained in Brazil under Aussaresses' orders and advised the South American juntas on counter-insurrection warfare and the use of torture that was widely used against leftist opponents to the military regimes in Argentina, Bolivia, Brazil, Chile, Paraguay, and Uruguay.

== Popular culture ==
The character of Julien Boisfeuras in the novels The Centurions and The Praetorians by Jean Larteguy was according to Larteguy not based on anyone, but many believe that he was at least partially inspired by Aussaresses and Roger Trinquier.

An inmate in the asylum for 'noble executioners' in the Jens Bjørneboe novel Powderhouse shares the same biography as Aussaresses; he is described as having served in Algiers and later teaching his methods to South American death squads.

== Bibliography ==
- Aussaresses, General Paul. The Battle of the Casbah: Terrorism and Counter-Terrorism in Algeria, 1955-1957. New York, Enigma Books, 2010.
- Horne, Alistair. A Savage War of Peace: Algeria 1954-1962. London, Macmillan, 1971.
