= Jacques Faure (French Army officer) =

French Army general and skier (1904–1988)

- Born: 2 March 1904; Bordeaux, France
- Died: 9 April 1988 (aged 84); Paris, France
- Military career
- Allegiance: France
- Branch: French Army
- Service years: 1927–1961
- Rank: General de division
- Commands: 1er RCP; 27e BIM
- Conflicts: World War II; Algerian War

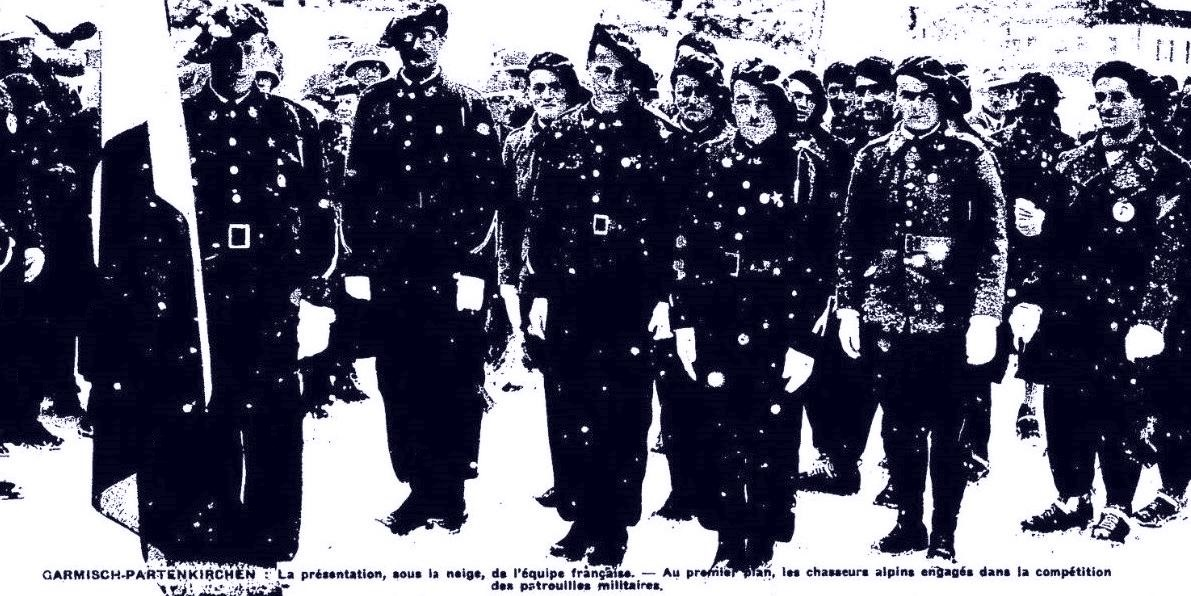
Jacques Faure flag bearer of the French delegation at the Olympic Games in Garmisch-Partenkirchen in 1936.jpg

Jacques Marie Alfred Gaston Faure (2 March 1904 – 9 April 1988) was a French Army general and skier. He was the leader of the French national Olympic military patrol team in 1936 which placed sixth and in 1961 one of the masterminds of the Algiers putsch.

== Biography ==
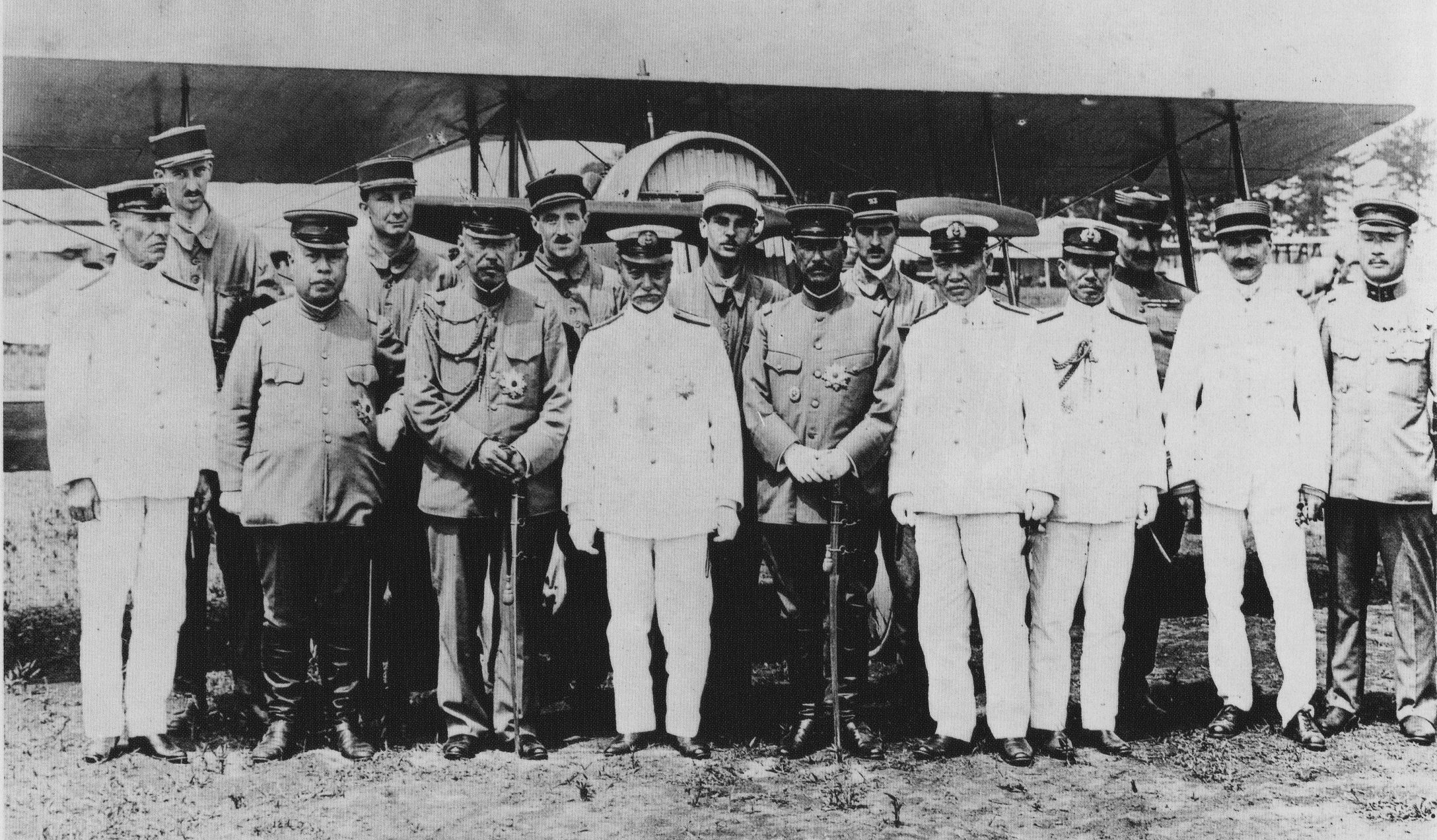
Jacques Faure (front row, 2nd from right) with Togo Heihachiro and French Airforce Mission members at Kakamigahara Air Base near Gifu in 1919.

Jacques Faure was born on 2 March 1904 in Bordeaux, Gironde department. He was the son of colonel that was killed during World War I and grandson of a general. During his service in the army he was a chasseurs alpins soldier and a paratrooper. He passed the École spéciale militaire de Saint-Cyr (ESM). In October 1927 he joined the 13th Chasseurs Alpins Battalion in Chambéry, where he became leader of a ski reconnaissance platoon from 1930 to 1931, and afterwards Captain. Meanwhile, he visited the high mountain school École de Haute Montagne (EHM) in Chamonix in 1930. From 1932 to 1938 he was commander of the French military ski team, and was French Champion in military skiing the same years. During this period he led the Olympic team in Garmisch-Partenkirchen. In 1938 he was transferred to the general staff of the 64th Alpine Division.

=== World War II ===
During World War II he was attaché in the General Staff of the High Mountain Brigade from 1939 to 1940 under command of Émile Béthouart, who was expedition corps leader in Narvik, Norway. After the Second Armistice at Compiègne he was transferred to London, Great Britain, and afterwards General Charles de Gaulle ordered him back to France, where he served at the ESM Saint-Cyr. In 1940 he was co-founder of the Jeunesse et Montagne (JM), a youth organization of the French Air Force. From November 1940 to 1942 he was stationed in Morocco, afterwards until March 1943 in Algiers, Algeria. Back to Europe, he served as deputy commander of the 1st Parachute Chasseur Regiment (1er RCP) in Italy. In the autumn of 1944 he became Lieutenant-colonel and commander of the 1er RCP, then deployed in the Vosges Mountains until February 1945.

After the war he served in the General Staff of the French Army until 1946, where he was head of the airmobile forces section, and afterwards department chef 3. Advanced to Colonel in October 1946, he became commander of the 25th Airmobile Division. From 1952 to 1953 he served as military governor in the general staff in Vienna, occupied Austria, followed by a deployment in the general staff of the HQ Allied Forces Central Europe (AFCENT) in Fontainebleau after October 1953. In the rank of Général de Brigade, he was commander of the École d'Application d'Infanterie de Saint-Maixent (former infantry school) after 1954 and also commander of the high mountain school EHM in Chamonix. He became the first president of the Commission Armées Jeunesse (CAJ; Commission Youth Armies), which was official founded by the French defence minister in 1955.

In September 1956 he was ordered again to Algeria.

=== Algerian War ===
During the Algerian War he was commanding general of the 27th Mountain Infantry Brigade in Kabylie after 1956, and chief of staff of the French Army Corps Command in Algiers. Meanwhile, he was promoted to Général de Division.

In Algeria he planned a coup de main against the French government in North Africa and talked about it with his friend Paul Teitgen. The French General Governor Robert Lacoste should be captured during an inspection trip and General Raoul Salan should become military and civilian governor of Algeria. The plan was betrayed and could not be realized. Faure was captured in 1956, was transferred to Paris, and was sentenced in January 1957 to thirty days of arrest in the barracks of La Courneuve. Faure was one of the masterminds of the later putsch and was sentenced to ten years of prison in 1961, although he stood in Paris during the realization. In April 1966, he was pardoned and released from prison. He got back his rank in 1974 and was politically rehabilitated in 1982. In 1986, he was made honor member of the Secours de France. Two years later, he died in Paris.

== Decorations ==
- Commander of the Légion d'honneur, 1953
- Croix de guerre 1939–1945 with 5 palms
- Croix de la Valeur Militaire with palm
- Médaille de l'Aéronautique
- Commander of the Ordre du Mérite sportif (Order of sportive merit)
- Médaille d'Or de l'Éducation Physique (gold medal of physical education)
- Krigskorset med sverd (Norway), 1946
- Commander of the Order of St. Olav (Norway), 1946
- Officer of Merit of the Military and Hospitaller Order of Saint Lazarus of Jerusalem, 1945
