= Nicolas Le Nen =

French Army officer

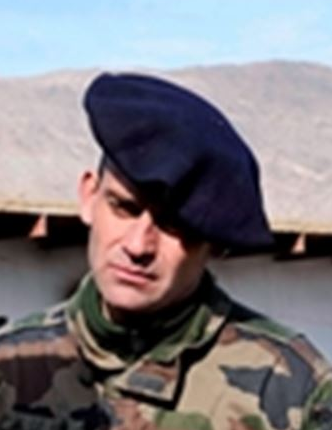
- Nicolas Le Nen in Kapisa province, Afghanistan, April 21, 2009
- Born: 1966 (age 59–60)
- Military career
- Allegiance: French Army
- Service years: 1989–
- Rank: Brigadier general
- Commands: 27e BCA; Groupement tactique interarmes de Kapisa Action Division
- Conflicts: War in Afghanistan
- Awards: Knight of the Légion d'honneur Croix de la Valeur Militaire; Bronze Star Medal

Nicolas Le Nen is a French Army officer. Since 2007, he has commanded the 27ème bataillon de chasseurs alpins, and heads the Groupement tactique interarmes de Kapisa.

== Biography ==
Le Nen joined Saint-Cyr in 1986, and chose Infantry after graduation. After a year at the École d'application de l'infanterie, he joined the 27ème bataillon de chasseurs alpins in Annecy, and later in Perpignan as a unit commander.

Rising to lieutenant-colonel, he served at the Army headquarter under General Yves Crene from 1999 to 2002, under general Bernard Thorette from 2002 to 2006, and under general Bruno Cuche from 2006 to 2007

On 31 August 2007, Le Nen was promoted to colonel and took command of the 27 BCA, for two years.

Le Nen has also headed the groupement tactique interarmes de Kapisa from December 2008 to June 2009. He notably commanded during the Battle of Alasay, after which he was awarded the U.S. Bronze Star.

After post on classic infantry, Le Nen enters the DGSE (French foreign intelligence agency), in the clandestine action branch ("Service Action") in 1996.

- DGSE/CPIS : Unit commander (1996–1999)

- DGSE : Commanding officer of the Action Division (2014–2018)

- CPCO : commanding officer (since 2020)

== Honours ==
- Officer of the Légion d’honneur
- Croix de la Valeur Militaire
- Croix du combattant
- Overseas Medal
- Médaille de la Défense nationale bronze
- Médaille de reconnaissance de la Nation (d’Afrique du Nord)
- Médaille commémorative française
- Bronze Star Medal

== Works ==
- Hervé de Courrèges, Pierre-Joseph Givre and Nicolas Le Nen (preface by Henri Bentégeat), Guerre en montagne : renouveau tactique, Économica, Paris, 2006, ISBN 2-7178-5327-8
- Nicolas Le Nen (ill. Yvon Ristori), Notre panache, École spéciale militaire de Saint-Cyr, Coëtquidan, 1989, OCLC 461951478
