= 11e régiment parachutiste de choc =

Elite French regiment

Insignia of the regiment

The 11^{e} régiment parachutiste de choc ('11th shock parachute regiment'), often called 11^{e} choc, was an elite parachute regiment of the French Army. It used to serve as the armed branch of the SDECE, France's external intelligence agency between 1944 and 1982. Its insignia, designed by lieutenant Dupas, features Bagheera in the moonlight and a golden wing. The motto is Qui ose gagne ('who dares wins'), in continuation of the tradition of the British Special Air Service.

== History ==
The 11^{e} choc was meant from the start to constitute a reserve of soldiers available to the French special services. The 11^{e} choc was initially composed of one single battalion, the 11^{e} bataillon parachutiste de choc. From 1 September 1946, it was stationed in Mont-Louis.

In the aftermath of the Second World War, an "action service" of the SDECE was created by Jacques Morlane. It grouped veterans of the Second World War having served in the Bataillon de Choc of 1936, in the 1^{er} bataillon de choc (founded in 1943), or as SOE agents, as well as veterans of the Indochina wars.

In spring of 1947, Morlane sent R. Mautaint in Mont-Louis to train the new unit. Mautaint had authored numerous reports on SOE training that inspired that of the French services.

In July 1947, as the complement of the 11^{e} choc grew, Morlane nominated Paul Aussaresses to replace Mautaint. Aussaresses described his mission as "perform what was by then called 'psychological warfare', wherever it was necessary, notably in Indochina ... I trained my men for clandestine operations, airborne or otherwise, that could range from building demolition to sabotage or elimination of enemies". From 1952, elements of the 11^{e} choc were sent to Indochina to lead and train the Groupement de commandos mixtes aéroportés (GCMA), though the 11^{e} choc did not take part in the conflict as a unit.

Back from Indochina in 1952, Aussaresses was tasked to assassinate supporters of the FLN. Morlane "was convinced that a Soviet invasion was imminent, and had been busy constituting secret weapon caches all over the territory so that, when time would come, a resistance could be organised".

On 1 October 1955, a 12^{e} bataillon parachutiste de choc was created. It was stationed in Calvi and Corte, in Corsica. Together, the 11th and 12th Battalions were the 11^{e} demi-brigade parachutiste de choc (11^{e} DBPC), also formed on 1 October. The insignia of the 12^{e} BPC featured an eagle and a star on a parachute background.

In late October 1956, elements of both battalions took part in the Suez Crisis.

The 12^{e} BPC was disbanded on 30 April 1957 and immediately re-created as the 1^{er} bataillon parachutiste de choc. Its insignia featured a dagger with a map of France as background, and its motto was En pointe toujours ('at the tip, always'). From 1 May 1957, the 11^{e} DBPC was thus constituted of the 11th BPC, the 1st BPC and the bataillon d'instruction spécialisé (BIS, 'specialist training battalion'), based in Calvi, Corté, Collioure, and Mont-Louis.

During the Algerian War, the 11^{e} Choc at first deployed a groupement léger d'intervention (GLI, 'light intervention group'), and later a groupement de marche (GM 11.DBPC), as well as local antennas of the "action service", and a specialised detachment called DS 111.

The 11^{e} Choc did not take part in the Algiers putsch of 1961, but some officers did sympathise towards the putschists. The unit was disbanded on 31 December 1963 and its standard handed over to the National Commando Training Center at Mont-Louis.

In 1985, general René Imbot, director of the DGSE, re-created the 11^{e} choc as the 11^{e} régiment parachutiste de choc (11^{e} RPC). In 1988, elements took part in the Ouvéa cave assault.

The restructuring of the French Intelligence and Special Operations organs following the Gulf War entailed the disbanding of the 11^{e} RPC on 31 December 1993.

== Commanding officers ==
=== 11^{e} bataillon parachutiste de choc ===
- 1946–1947: CNE Mautaint
- 1947: CNE Rivière
- 1947–1948: CNE Paul Aussaresses
- 1948–1953: CBN Yves Godard
- 1953–1955: CES Pierre Decorse
- 1955–1957: CNE Bauer
- 1958–1960: CNE Erouart
- 1960–1961: CBN Crousillac
- 1961–1962: CBN Mouton
- 1962–1963: CBN Dabezies
- 1963: CBN Barthes

=== 11^{e} demi-brigade parachutiste de choc ===
- 1955–1961: COL Pierre Decorse
- 1961–1963: LCL Albert Merglen
