= National Commando Training Center =

French Army training centre

The National Centre for Commando Training, (French: Centre national d'entraînement commando, CNEC) is a French Army training centre. It is a centre d'aguerrissement located in Mont-Louis and Collioure in the Pyrenees-Orientales department, and is part of the Sous-direction formation et des écoles de la direction des ressources humaines de l'Armée de terre (DRHAT/SDFE).

As of 18 July 2022, the commander was Lieutenant Colonel Damien Lefèbvre.

== History ==
Created on the 1st January 1964, as a descendant of the 11e régiment parachutiste de choc, the National Centre for Commando Training is a unique establishment that specialises in commando training in France.

With the return of the French troops from Algeria in 1961, it was recognised that the training methods of the shock troops were highly effective for modern warfare. Thus ten centres were created in Metropolitan France and Germany, most often in austere fortifications. The first commando training centre created in France was the Centre d'entraînement commando (Givet) of Givet at the Fortress of Charlemont, in the department of Ardennes. It was designed in 1961, put into operation in 1962, by and for the 11e division légère d'intervention (11e DLI), a Parachute Division created in 1961 from the 10e and 25e divisions parachutistes (DP) d'Algérie. Subsequently, the creation of the Givet CEC was entrusted to 1er commando parachutiste et aux sapeurs parachutistes of the 61e compagnie du génie aéroporté (61e CGAP), which had recently returned from Algeria, resulting in the formation of the 17th Parachute Engineer Regiment (17th BGAP).

After being established in 1964, the CNEC de Mont-Louis and Collioure trained cadres of the French Army and also received special forces and foreign trainees from United Kingdom, Germany, Belgium, Spain, the United States, and Morocco.

== Training ==
After three weeks of training in a CEC, an entire unit is awarded the entraînement commando badge, flanked by the number associated with the centre (Number 1 for CNEC).

- For NCOs, after five weeks at the CNEC, they are awarded the gold moniteur badge.
- For Officers, after eight weeks at the CNEC, they are awarded the gold instructeur badge.

== Flag ==
The CNEC uses the Colour of the 1er régiment d'infanterie de choc aéroporté which has the following battle honours sewn in gold letters:

- Corsica 1943
- Elba Island 1944
- Cape Negro - Toulon 1944
- Upper Alsace 1944–1945
- Indochina 1947–1948 1951–1954
- AFN 1952–1962.
