= 27th Mountain Infantry Brigade =

- 27^{e} Brigade d'Infanterie de Montagne
- Badge of the 27th Mountain Infantry Brigade
- Active: 1888–present
- Country: France
- Branch: French Army
- Type: Mountain infantry
- Size: ~6,500
- Part of: 1st Division
- Garrison/HQ: Varces, France

Commanders
- Notable commanders: Jean Vallette d'Osia; Jacques Faure; Alain Le Ray

The 27th Mountain Infantry Brigade (French: 27^{e} Brigade d'Infanterie de Montagne, 27^{e} BIM) is a mountain infantry formation of the French Army. The brigade is subordinated to the 1st Armored Division and specializes in mountain warfare.

== History ==
The brigade is heir to the traditions of

- the 1st Alpine Division French Forces of the Interior (FFI), created in September 1944
- renamed the 27th Alpine Division and finally 27th Alpine Infantry Division in December 1944
- the 27th Alpine Brigade in December 1962
- the 27th Alpine Division in August 1976
- the 27th division d'infanterie de montagne (27th DIM) in July 1994.

With the end of conscription, all of the French Army's divisions were downsized and the 27th became a brigade in 1999.

After the liberation of the Combe de Savoie and the Grésivaudan, Colonel Jean Vallette d'Osia became the commander of the 1st Alpine Division of the French Forces of the Interior (1ere Division alpine FFI) in September 1944, which unified the mountain units created in the French Resistance in the northern Alps. The unit, the first FFI division, was formed at the suggestion of Colonel Marcel Descour, the FFI commander in Lyon, and approved by General Jean de Lattre de Tassigny. Vallette d'Osia located his headquarters in Challes-les-Eaux. Charles de Gaulle reformed the 27th Alpine Infantry Division on 17 November 1944 under the command of General Eugène Molle. The division, which became operational in January 1945, included the 5th Alpine Demi-Brigade (DBA) under the command of Lieutenant Colonel Le Ray and the 7th Alpine Demi-Brigade under the command of Colonel De Galbert. Its 159th Infantry Regiment was sent to defend Strasbourg in the same month and did not return to the Alps until March. While the 27th was reorganized, the Alpine valleys were held by the 4th Moroccan Mountain Division (4e DMM), which rejoined the 1st Army on 17 November. The 4e DMM left behind its artillery, which was used to reform the 27th's 93rd Mountain Artillery Regiment (93e RAM).

=== After World War II ===
From 4 September 1945 the division replaced the 4th Moroccan Mountain Division in occupying Austria, under command of General Béthouart. The French occupation zone there disappeared on 26 October 1955.

From 1954 to 1962, they served in Algeria, especially in the mountains of Kabylia, led by General Faure. Some 1,000 Alpines were killed in Algeria.

In 1989 the division included the 27e Régiment de Commandement et de Soutien (27e RCS) at Grenoble; the fr:4e régiment de chasseurs (4e RCh), Gap (36x Panhard ERC-90); the 6e Bataillon de Chasseurs Alpins (6e BCA), Varces-Allières-et-Risset; the 7e Bataillon de Chasseurs Alpins (7e BCA), Bourg-Saint-Maurice; the 11e Bataillon de Chasseurs Alpins (11e BCA), Barcelonnette; the 13e Bataillon de Chasseurs Alpins (13e BCA), Chambéry; the 27e Bataillon de Chasseurs Alpins (27e BCA), Annecy; the 159e Régiment d'Infanterie Alpine (159e RIA), Briançon; the 93e Régiment d'Artillerie de Montagne, Varces (24x towed M101), and the 7e Bataillon du Génie de division Alpine (7e BGDA), Avignon.

Later, the "Alpins" of the 27th mountain infantry brigade intervened in Lebanon, Chad, Bosnia-Herzegovina, Ivory Coast and Afghanistan. In 2016, the brigade was attached to the 1st Division.

== Units ==
As of 2025, the brigade's units included:

- 27^{e} Brigade d’Infanterie de Montagne (27^{e} BIM) – 27th Mountain Infantry Brigade, in Grenoble
  - 27^{e} Compagnie de Commandement et de Transmissions de Montagne (27^{e} CCTM) - 27th Mountain Command and Signals Company, in Varces
  - 4^{e} Régiment de Chasseurs (4^{e} RCh) - 4th Chasseurs Regiment (AMX-10 RC, ERC 90, VAB, VBL vehicles, being replaced by EBRC Jaguar vehicles), in Gap
  - 7^{e} Bataillon de Chasseurs Alpins (7^{e} BCA) - 7th Mountain Infantry Battalion (VAB, VHM vehicles), in Varces
  - 13^{e} Bataillon de Chasseurs Alpins (13^{e} BCA) - 13th Mountain Infantry Battalion (VBMR Griffon, VHM vehicles), in Barby
  - 27^{e} Bataillon de Chasseurs Alpins (27^{e} BCA) - 27th Mountain Infantry Battalion (VAB, VHM vehicles), in Cran-Gevrier
  - Bataillon de Réserve des Alpes - Reserve Battalion of the Alps, in Grenoble
  - 93^{e} Régiment d'Artillerie de Montagne (93^{e} RAM) - 93rd Mountain Artillery Regiment (CAESAR howitzers, RTF1 mortars, Mistral missiles), in Varces
  - 2^{e} Régiment Étranger de Génie (2^{e} REG) - 2nd Foreign Engineer Regiment, in Saint-Christol
  - 6^{e} Groupement d'Instruction de Montagne (6^{e} GIM) - 6th Mountain Instruction Group, in Gap
  - École militaire de haute montagne (EMHM) - High Mountain Military School, in Chamonix
    - Groupement d'Aguerrissement en Montagne (GAM) - Mountain Acclimatization Grouping, in Modane

== Bibliography ==
- Léon, Marie-Hélène (1997). Les Chasseurs Alpins – Mythe et réalité des troupes de Montagne [The Alpine Hunters: Myths and Realities of the mountain troops] (in French). Paris: L'Harmattan. ISBN 2738447376.
