= Action Division =

Clandestine division in France's Directorate-General for External Security (DGSE)

The Action Division (French: Division Action), commonly known by its predecessor's title Action Service (French: Service Action) is a division of France's Directorate-General for External Security (DGSE) responsible for planning and performing clandestine and covert operations including black operations. The core specialisations of the Action Division are sabotage, destruction of materiel, assassination, detaining/kidnapping, interrogation with and without using torture, infiltration/exfiltration of persons into/from hostile territory and hostage rescue.

The division also fulfils other security-related roles including testing the security of strategic sites, for example nuclear power plants and military facilities such as the submarine base of the Île Longue, Bretagne. Organization Within the Action Division there are three separate groups,

- CPES for clandestine agents,
- CPIS for clandestine commandos, and
- CPEOM for clandestine combat divers.

The service's headquarters are located at the fort of Noisy-le-Sec. It replaced the Service Action of the SDECE in 1971.

== Organisation ==
The current action division originated from the SDECE's action service (Service Action or SA. Service Action is still commonly used). The action division has a "pool" of paramilitary operatives coming mainly from the French Army, often at least from the paras, and some from special forces. Since the early 1980s, the service action has been divided into three main parts: commandos, combat divers and air support.

The commandos were originally chunked in the "11e Choc" (11e Bataillon Parachutiste de Choc, 11th Shock Parachutist Battalion, later 11th Shock Parachutist Demi-Brigade), created in 1946. The 11e Choc was disbanded in 1963 because its officers were suspected to be French Algeria supporters. Consequently, its missions were partly given to military special forces units, especially the 1st Marine Infantry Parachute Regiment. After the sinking of the Rainbow Warrior in 1985, the "11e Choc" was re-raised in 1985 as the 11th Shock Parachutist Regiment. The unit was disbanded in 1993 among other various changes of French armed forces following the end of the cold war.

DGSE operatives are since based in three "training centres" which compose the Centre d'Instruction des Réservistes Parachutistes (CIRP, "Paratrooper Reservist Instruction Centre"):

- The Centre Parachutiste d'Entraînement Spécialisé (CPES, "Paratrooper Specialised Training Centre") in Cercottes for clandestine operations
- The Centre Parachutiste d'Instruction Spécialisée (CPIS, "Paratrooper Specialised Instruction Centre") in Perpignan for special commandos. The CPIS is the successor of the Centre d'entraînement à la Guerre Spéciale (CEGS, "Training Centre for Special Warfare")
- The Centre Parachutiste d'Entraînement aux Opérations Maritimes (CPEOM, "Paratrooper Training Centre for Maritime Operations") in Quelern, which instructs combat divers. The CPEOM is the successor of the Centre d'Instruction des Nageurs de Combat d'Aspretto.

Commando Hubert originally included servicemen from both French Navy and Army. The unit soon split in two, the army soldiers being transferred to the Centre d'Instruction des Nageurs de Combat (CINC, Combat Divers Training Centre, nicknamed Ajax) assigned to "11e Choc". In the aftermath of the disastrous Rainbow Warrior affair, the CINC was officially disbanded, and the DGSE combat divers were transferred in the CPEOM. Commando Hubert remains as the combat diver component of the French naval special operation forces, the Commandos Marine.

The air support of DGSE operations is provided by a French Air Force unit, the Groupe Aérien Mixte 00.056 (GAM 56) "Vaucluse", heir of a Free French Forces special duties flight. This unit received the Croix de la Valeur Militaire with bronze palms on 1 June 2012, for having "particularly distinguished itself in a number of very sensitive recent engagements".

Furthermore, the naval ship Alizé can provide support from the Navy to the benefit of the DGSE.

== History ==
=== SDECE ===
After the Second World War, Colonel Jacques Morlanne used a list of former SOE operatives to create a "Service Action" for the SDECE. In 1947, Morlanne sent captain Edgar Mautaint at Montlouis to create the 11e bataillon parachutiste de choc. In July 1947, Paul Aussaresses took over command of the battalion and started training his men in "carrying out what was then called 'psychological warfare', everywhere where necessary, and notably in Indochina (...) I prepared my men for clandestine operations, airborne or otherwise, which could range from exploding buildings, sabotage or elimination of enemies... a little bit like what I had learnt in England."

According to Constantin Melnik, then supervisor of secret services for Michel Debré, in 1960 alone, the Service Action killed 135 people, sank six ships and destroyed two aeroplanes.

=== Directors ===
The action division's directors were:

- 1971–1976 : Colonel André Devigny
- 1976–1980 : Colonel Gaigneron de Marolles
- 1980–1982 : Colonel (later Général) Georges Grillot
- 1982 – November 1984 : Colonel Jean-Pol Desgrees du Lou
- November 1984–1986 : Colonel Jean-Claude Lesquier
- 1986 – September 1987 : Colonel (later général de brigade) Jean Heinrich
- September 1987 – December 1989 : Colonel Pierre-Jacques Costedoat
- December 1989 – January 1995 : Christian Vie
- December 2002 – December 2004 : A. Aprile (?)
- 2004–2007 : Colonel Christophe Rastouil

== In popular culture ==
- The Day of the Jackal by Frederick Forsyth
- The Frenchman (book) by Jack Beaumont
- Dark Arena (book) by Jack Beaumont
