= 1st Airborne Shock Infantry Regiment =

The 1st Airborne Shock Infantry Regiment (French: 1er régiment d'infanterie de choc aéroporté, 1eR RICAP), then named the 1st Shock Regiment (French: 1er régiment de choc), is a former parachute unit of the French Army, created on 1 October 1945 and dissolved on 1 February 1947.

== Flag ==
Since 1 January 1964 the National Commando Training Center has been entrusted with the Colour of the 1st Airborne Shock Infantry Regiment, which has the following battle honours sewn in gold letters:

- Corsica 1943
- Elba Island 1944
- Cape Negro - Toulon 1944
- Upper Alsace 1944–1945
- Indochina 1947 – 1948 1951–1954
- AFN 1952–1962.

== See also ==
- List of French paratrooper units

== Bibliography ==
- Collectif, Histoire des parachutistes français Tomes 1 et 2, éditions Société de production littéraire, 1975.
- Jacques Sicard, Militaria Magazine no 313, p. 20-25.
