= Saint-Paul-Cap-de-Joux =

- Commune
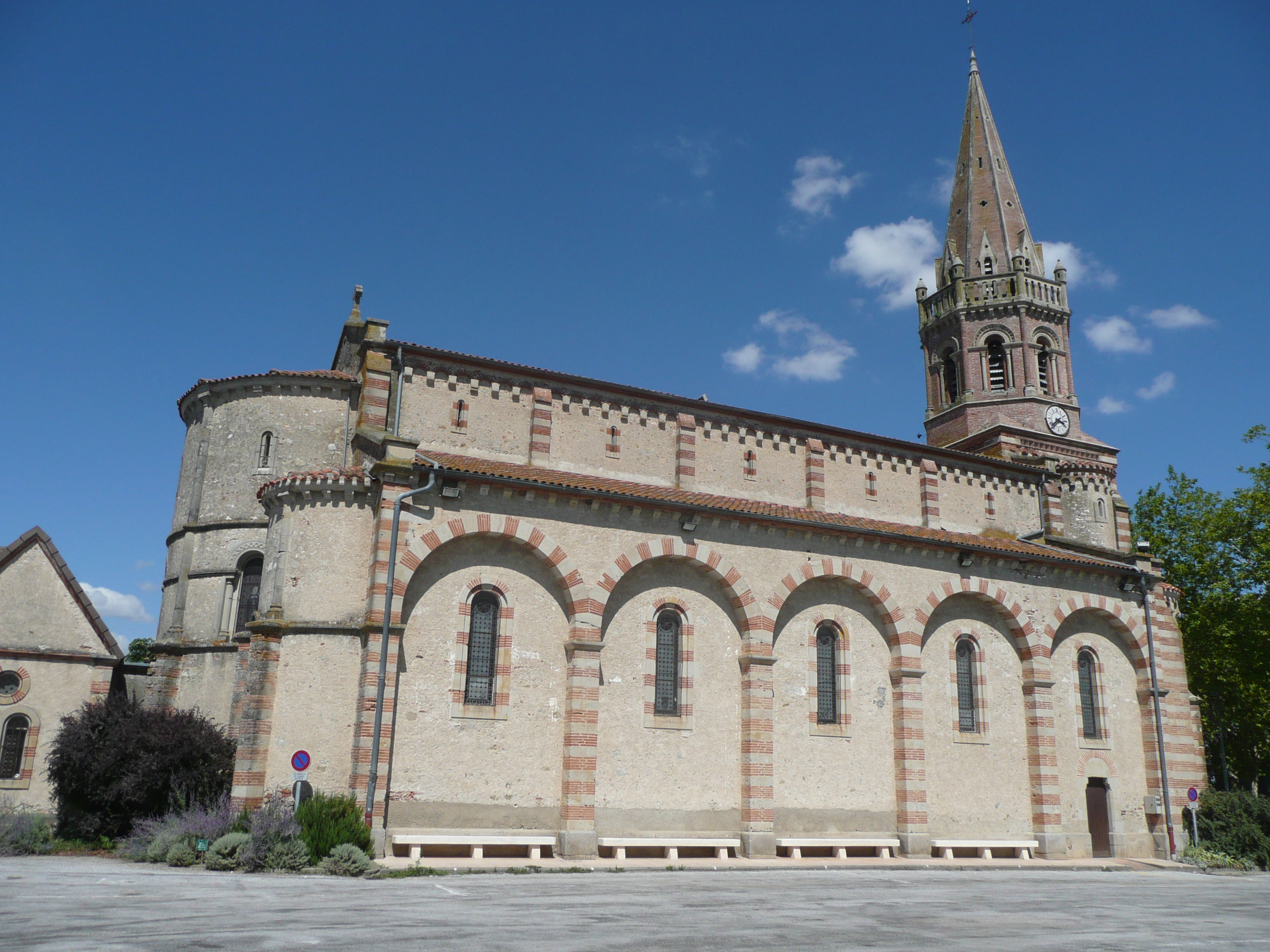
- The church in Saint-Paul-Cap-de-Joux

- Coat of arms
- Location of Saint-Paul-Cap-de-Joux
- Location within France Location within Occitanie
- Coordinates: 43°38′53″N 1°58′35″E
- Country: France
- Region: Occitania
- Department: Tarn
- Arrondissement: Castres
- Canton: Plaine de l'Agoût

Government
  - Mayor (2020–2026): Laurent Vandendriessche
- Area^{1}: 17.01 km^{2} (6.57 sq mi)
- Elevation: 155 m (509 ft)
- Highest elevation: 300 m (980 ft)
- Lowest elevation: 127 m (417 ft)
- Population (2023): 1,054
  - Density: 61.96/km^{2} (160.5/sq mi)
- Time zone: UTC+01:00 (CET)
  - Summer (DST): UTC+02:00 (CEST)
- INSEE/Postal code: 81266 /81220
- ^{1} French Land Register data, which excludes lakes, ponds, glaciers > 1 km^{2} (0.386 sq mi or 247 acres) and river estuaries.

Saint-Paul-Cap-de-Joux (French pronunciation: [sɛ̃ pɔl kap də ʒu]; Languedocien: Sant Pau del Cabdal Jòus) is a commune in the Tarn department in southern France.

== See also ==
- Communes of the Tarn department
