= Chasseurs Alpins =

Elite mountain infantry of the French Army

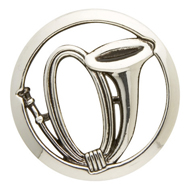
- Chasseurs Alpins insignia
- Active: 1888–present
- Country: France
- Branch: French Army
- Type: Infantry
- Role: Mountain infantry
- Size: Three battalions
- Garrison/HQ: 7^{e} Bataillon – Varces-Allières-et-Risset; 13^{e} Bataillon – Chambéry; 27^{e} Bataillon – Cran-Gevrier
- Nickname: Les diables bleus (Eng: The Blue Devils)
- Mottos: Jamais être pris vivant (Eng: Never to be Taken Alive); Sans peur et sans reproche (Eng: Without fear and beyond reproach) "Vivre libre ou mourir" (Eng: Live Free or Die)
- Engagements: World War I; Battle of the Yser; World War II; Battle of Narvik; War in Afghanistan; Battle of Alasay; 2026 Iran War

The Chasseurs Alpins (French: [ʃasœʁ alpɛ̃]; English: Alpine Hunters) are an elite infantry force of the French Army, established in 1888, primarily dedicated to mountain and cold-weather warfare.

== History ==
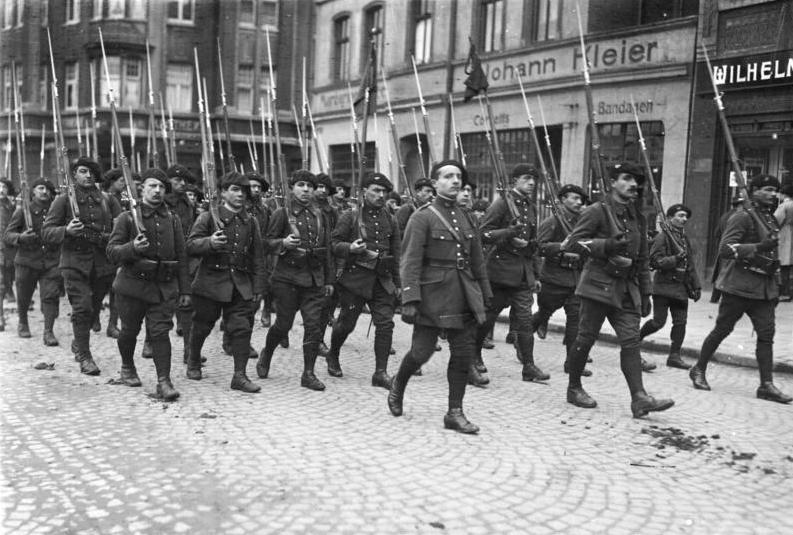
Chasseurs Alpins during the Occupation of the Ruhr in Buer (now Gelsenkirchen), 1923.

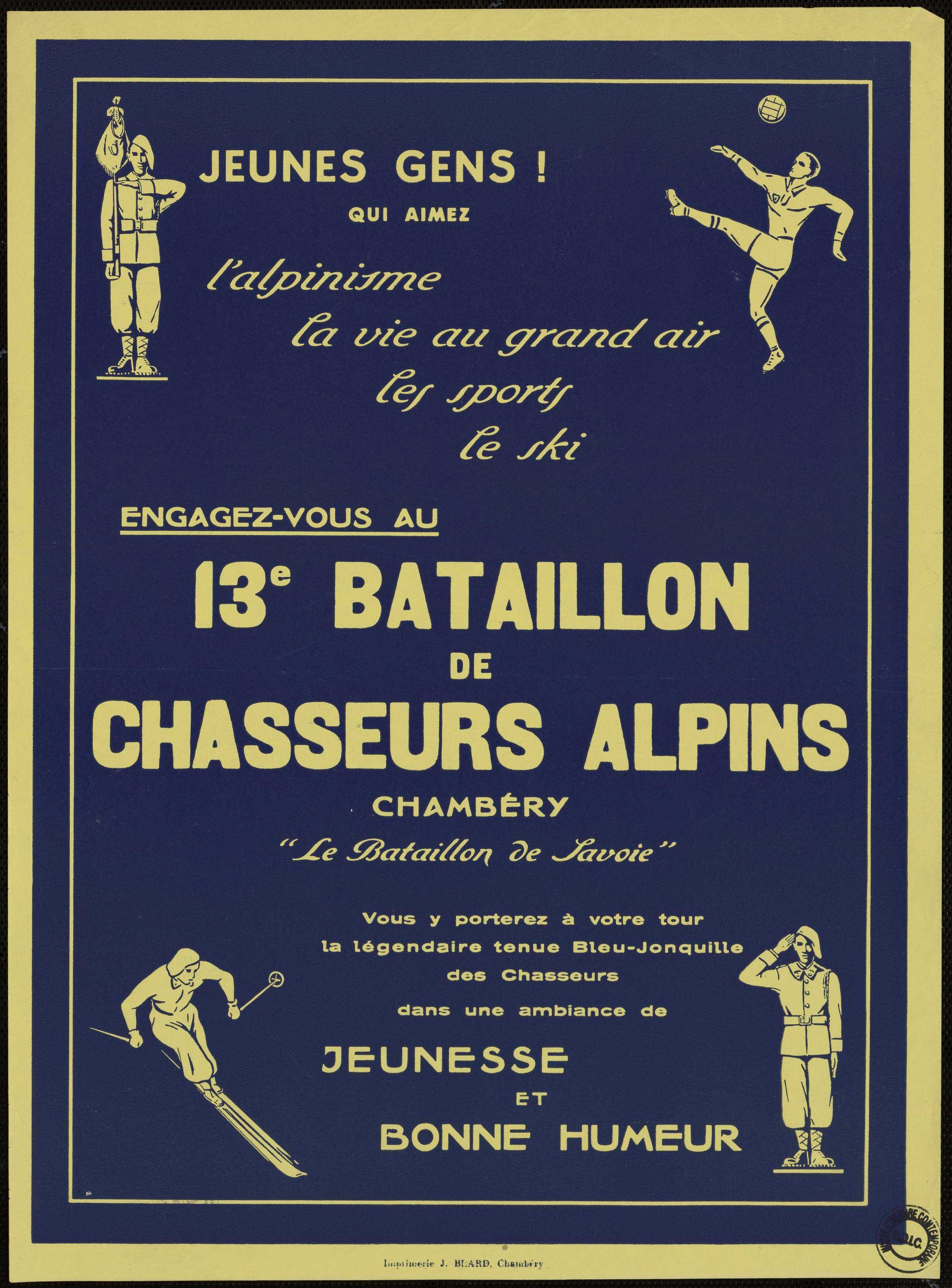
Vichy-era recruitment poster for the 13th Battalion

France created a mountain corps in the late 19th century to oppose any Italian invasion through the Alps. In 1859–70 the Unification of Italy, forming a powerful state, took place. The French army saw this geopolitical change as a potential threat to their Alpine border, especially as the Italian army was already creating troops specialized in mountain warfare (Alpini). On December 24, 1888, the first troupes de montagne (mountain troops) corps were created from 12 of the 31 existing Chasseurs à pied Hunters on Foot/Foot Rifles) battalions.

Initially these units were named bataillons alpins de chasseurs à pied (Alpine Battalions of Hunters on Foot/Alpine Foot Rifle Battalions). Later this was changed to bataillons de chasseurs alpins (Alpine Hunter Battalions/Alpine Rifle Battalions). From their establishment the chasseurs Alpins wore a plain and practical uniform designed to be suitable for mountain service. This comprised a loose-fitting dark blue jacket and blue-grey breeches, together with a large beret carrying the yellow (daffodil) hunting horn insignia of the Chasseur branch. They are believed to have been the first regular military unit to have worn this form of headdress. The 47e BCA was reformed at Bourg-Saint-Maurice in 1979, and dissolved on 1 July 1985.

== Modern unit ==
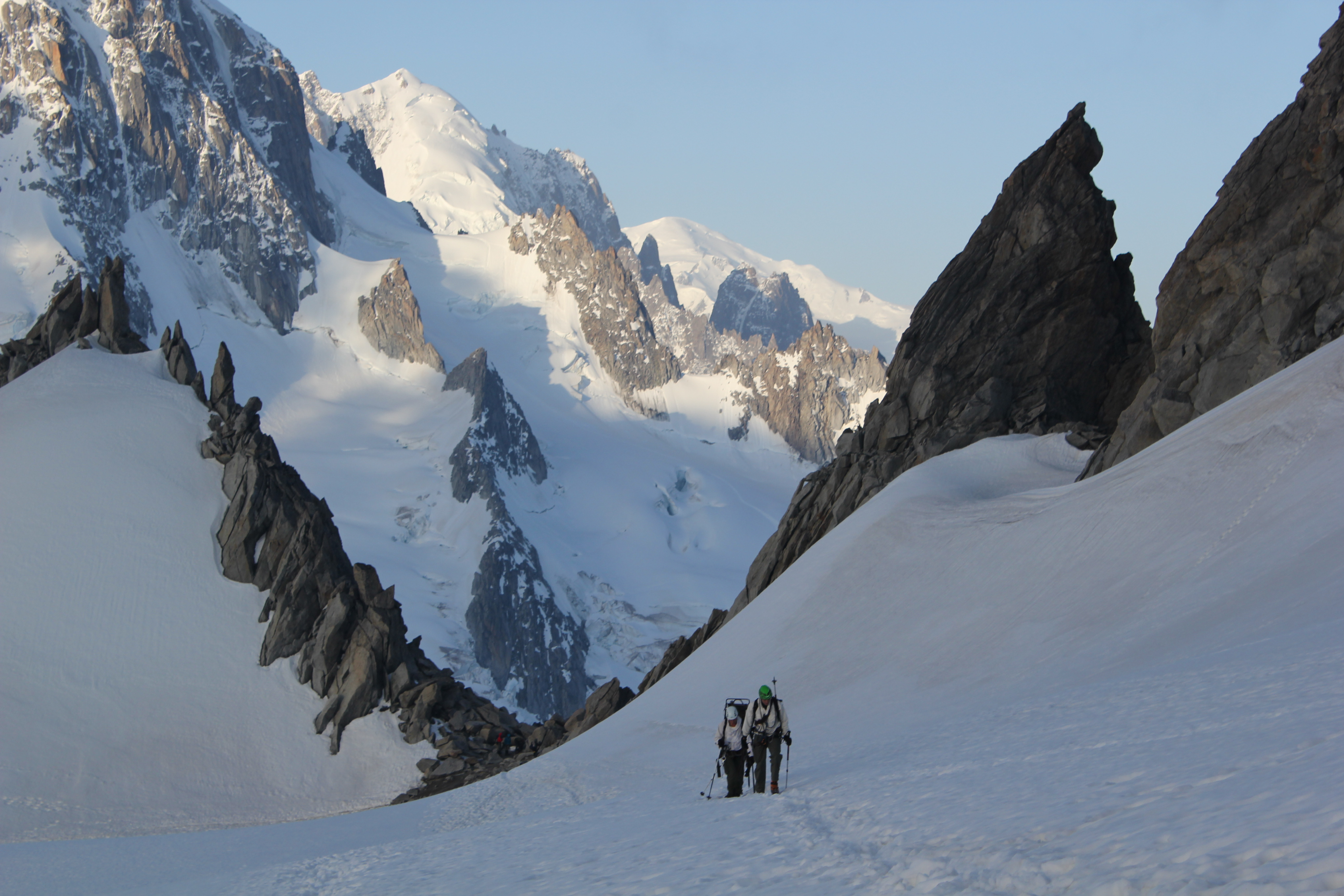
Training of chasseurs alpins on the Mont Blanc massif.

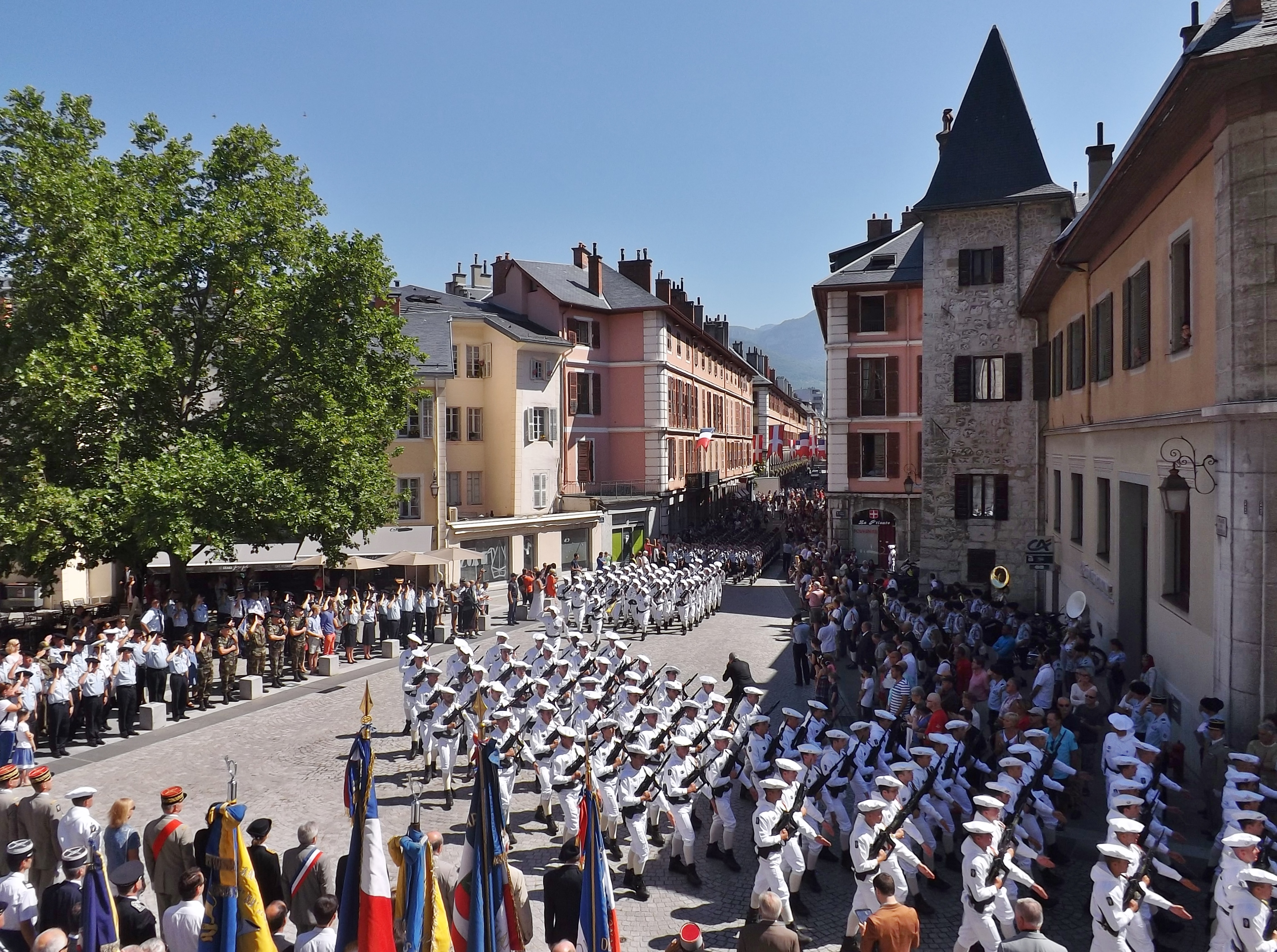
13th Battalion in Chambéry (Savoie)

Since 1999 they have been (with other units) part of the 27th Mountain Infantry Brigade (Brigade d'Infanterie de Montagne), and are currently organised into three battalions:

- 7th Battalion, Varces (Grenoble)
- 13th Battalion, Chambéry
- 27th Battalion, Cran-Gevrier (Annecy)

All three battalions are based in cities in the French Alps, thus the name of the units.

Training includes climbing, Ski mountaineering, plus winter and summer mountain leadership and mountain guiding skills completed at the High Mountain Military School. Traditional training included mountain survival skills such as to build an igloo shelter and to sleep in temperatures around 0 °C. Modern troops may be transported in all-terrain VMBs, VACs, (Bandvagn 206) or untracked VAB personnel carriers. Personal weaponry includes the FAMAS assault rifle, Minimi machine gun, FRF-2 sniper rifle, PGM Hécate II heavy sniper rifle, and LGI light mortar, while group weapons included the M2 machine gun, LLR 81mm mortar, and vehicle-mounted 20 mm autocannon, plus AT4, Eryx and MILAN anti-tank missiles.

The chasseurs are easily recognised by their wide beret (when not in battle uniform), named the tarte des Alpes (after a type traditional alpine tart). Note though that this is also worn by other mountain troops, such as the Alpine infantry, cavalry, artillery, and signals except for the 2ème REG engineers who wear the green beret.

The 16th battalion of chasseurs are not mountain troops and wear the standard French Army blue beret with the chasseur cap badge.

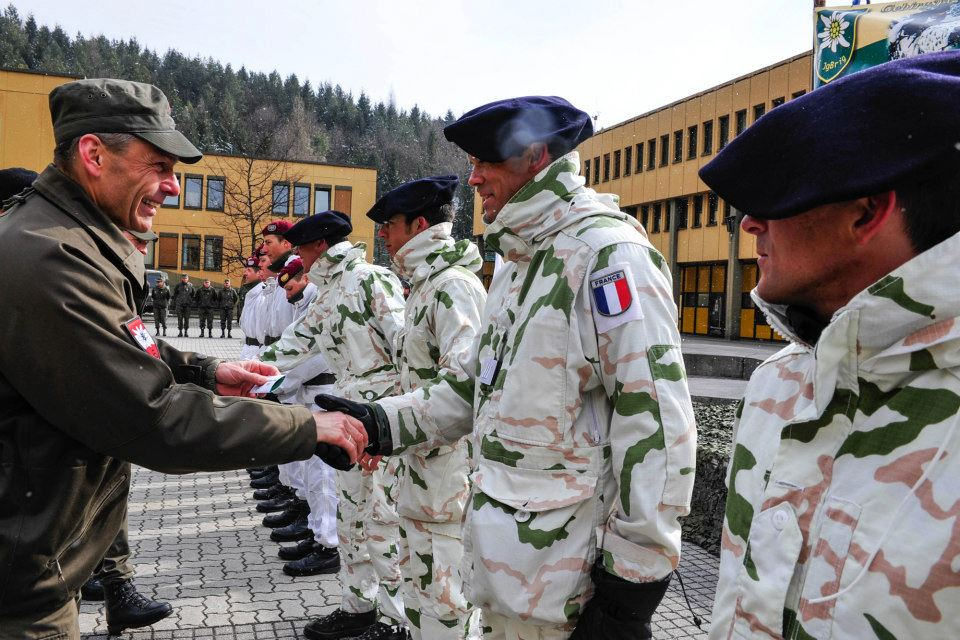
Tundra Camouflage

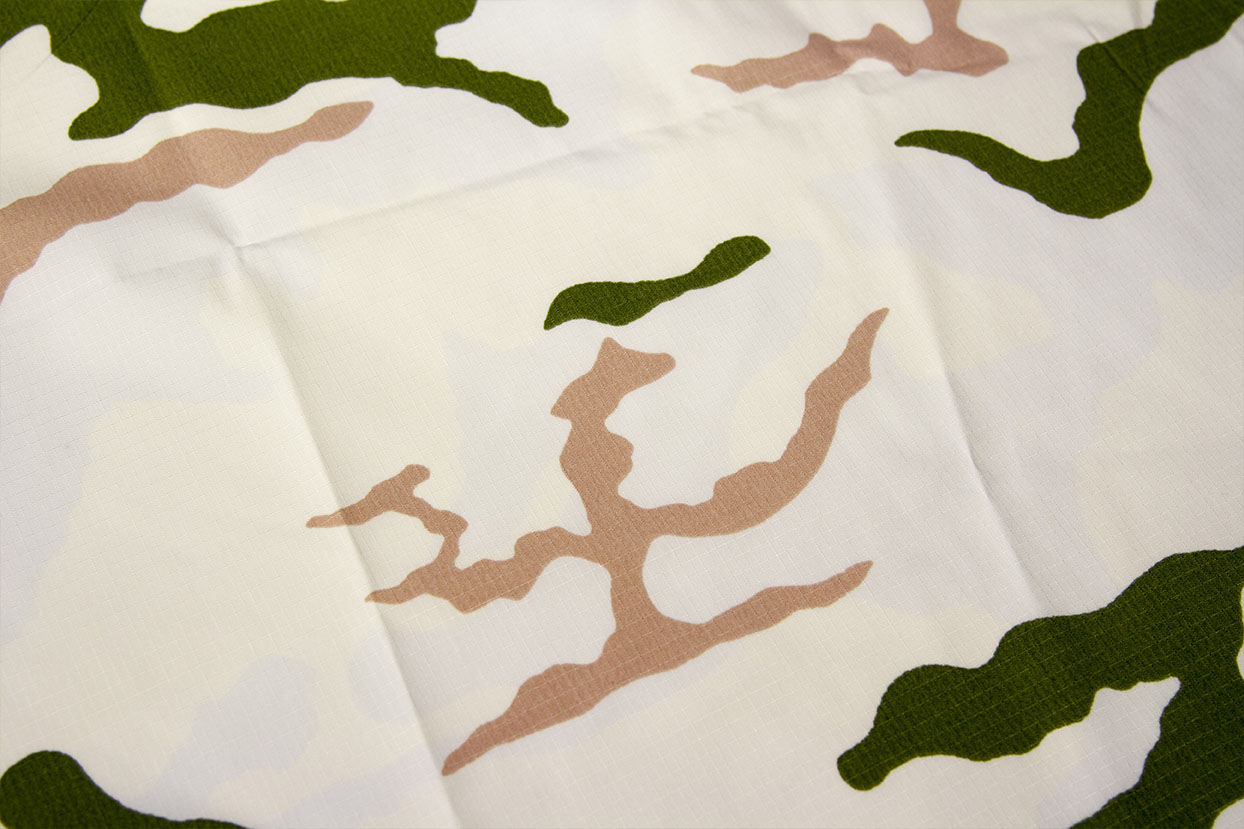
French Tundra Camouflage

Current winter uniform consists of 'Tundra' camouflage made in 50/50 ripstop. It was specifically created for the Chasseurs & has later been adopted by other French units such as the GCM for winter exercises.

== Various traditions ==
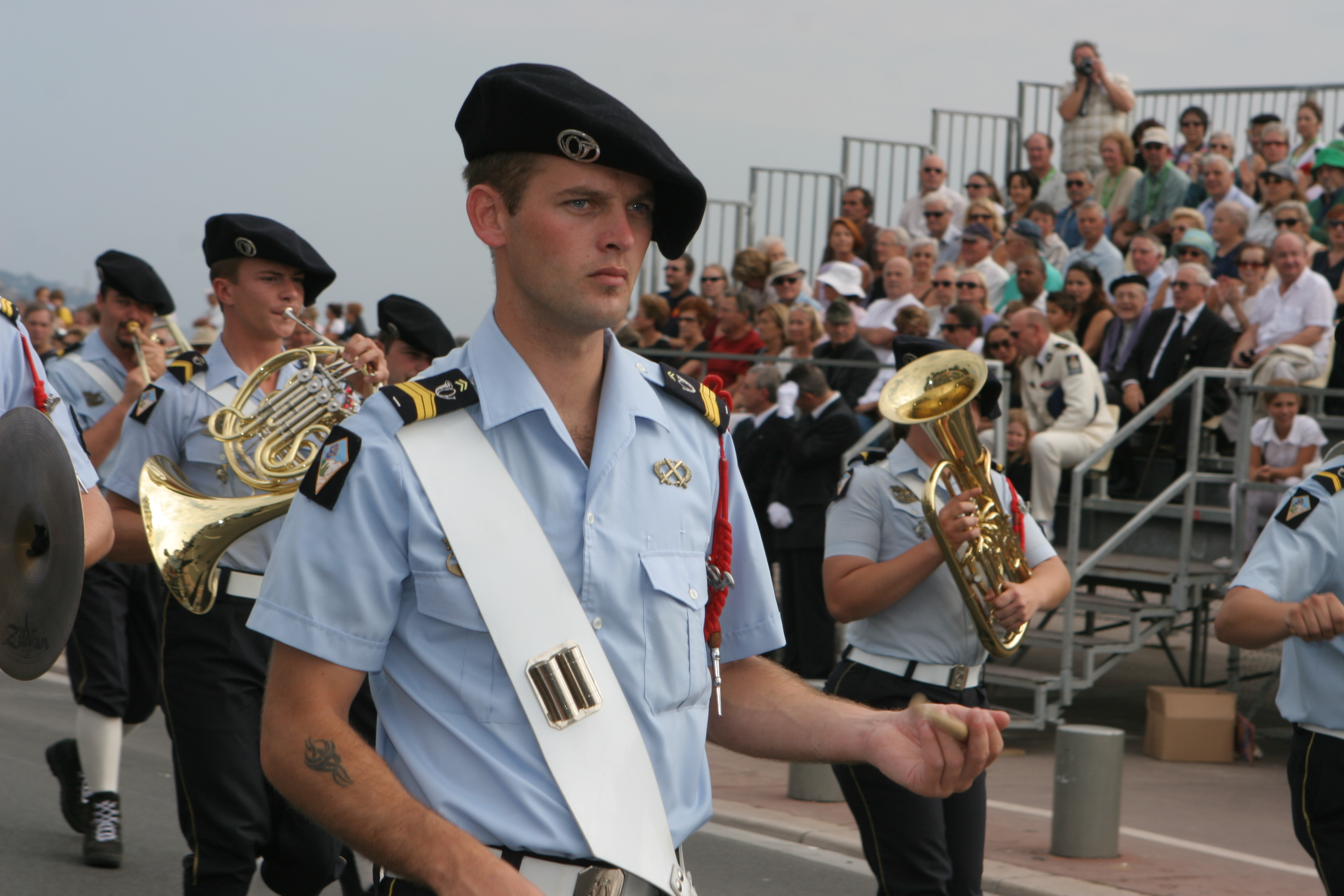
Military band of the chasseurs alpins

Chasseurs do not say rouge (red) but bleu-cerise (cherry blue - The color of blood on their blue uniforms), except when speaking of the color of the lips of a beloved, the red in the Legion of Honour's insignia (including its fourragère which is called la rouge), and the red of the French flag. This stems from the days when Napoleon III tried to impose the wearing of the scarlet pantalons garance. The mountain troops objected, and no longer use the word 'red' as a result.

The chasseurs have a few other typicalities in what they say:

- not jaune (yellow), but jonquille (daffodil);
- not uniforme (uniform), but tenue (outfit, or dress), like in the Royale;
- not la musique (the music), but la fanfare (the band);
- the band does not joue (play), but sonne (the band sounds);
- not tambour (drum), but caisse claire (snare drum);
- and not caserne (barracks), but quartier (neighborhood, barracks, or quarters).

The chasseurs are said to have green blood, after the pun: "Le sang vert, c'est pour la France; Le sang versé pour la France" ("Green blood is for France'; Blood shed, 'poured out', for France").

Note that these traditions are also shared by the 16th battalion of chasseurs, who are not chasseurs alpins.

When marching with the band and horns, the marching pace is 140 steps a minute - faster than most other armed forces units, with the exception of the Italian Bersaglieri, whose pace is 180 steps per minute.

The chasseurs alpins are informally known as Les diables bleus (Eng: The Blue Devils). Monuments and memorials to the unit, such as Memorial to the Chasseur Alpins are marked Aux Diables Bleus (Eng: To the Blue Devils).

== Choruses and Ringin ==
24 hours with the Chasseurs Alpins

A chasseur salutes when he hears the chorus of his battalion, or Les Allobroges (the anthem of Savoie). Each battalion has a different chorus, and a chasseur must learn all of them:

- 1^{er} bataillon « Si l'septième de ligne a des couilles au cul, C'est qu'le Premier Chasseurs les lui a foutues ! »
- 2^{e} bataillon « Le Commandant a mal aux dents, mes enfants ! » (bis)
- 3^{e} bataillon « V'la l'troisième, v'la l'troisième, qui rapplique au galop, V'la l'troisième, v'la l'troisième, qui rapplique sac au dos ! »
- 4^{e} bataillon « Quatrième bataillon, Commandant Clinchant, Toujours en avant ! »
- 5^{e} bataillon « Cinquième Bataillon ventre à terre, Commandé par Certain Canrobert, en avant ! »
- 6^{e} bataillon « Le sixième est là, il est un peu là ! »
- 7^{e} bataillon « Bataillon, Bataillon, Bataillon de fer, Bataillon, Bataillon, Bataillon d'acier ».
- 8^{e} bataillon « T'as beau courir, tu ne m'rattraperas pas ! » (bis)
- 9^{e} bataillon « Marie, j'ai vu ton cul tout nu, Cochon, pourquoi le regardes-tu ? »
- 10^{e} bataillon « Dixième Bataillon, Commandant Mac-Mahon, N'a pas peur du canon nom de nom »
- 11^{e} bataillon « Onzième Bataillon de Chasseurs Alpins, Onzième Bataillon d'lapins »
- 12^{e} bataillon « Ah c'qu'il est con, c'qu'il est con l'Douzième, Ah c'qu'il est con, c'qu'il est con c'con là ! »
- 13^{e} bataillon « Sans pain, sans fricot, au treizième on n'boit que d'l'eau ! »
- 14^{e} bataillon « La peau de mes roulettes pour une casquette, La peau de mes rouleaux pour un shako ! »
- 15^{e} bataillon « Je fumerais bien une pipe, Mais je n'ai pas de tabac ! »
- 16^{e} bataillon « Seizième Bataillon d'Chasseurs à pied, Seizième Bataillon d'Acier ! »
- 17^{e} bataillon « Cré nom d'un chien, nous voilà bien partis, Cré nom d'un chien, nous voilà bien ! »
- 18^{e} bataillon « Encore un biffin d'enfilé, rompez, Encore un biffin d'enfilé ! »
- 19^{e} bataillon « Trou du cul, trou du cul plein de poils sales, Trou du cul, trou du cul poilu ! »
- 20^{e} bataillon « Vingtième Bataillon, Commandant Cambriels, Les Chasseurs à pied ont des ailes ! »
- 21^{e} bataillon « En voulez-vous des kilomètres ? En voilà ! »
- 22^{e} bataillon « Encore un biffin de tombé dans la merde, Encore un biffin d'emmerdé ! »
- 23^{e} bataillon « V'la le vingt-troisième, nom de Dieu, ça va barder ! »
- 24^{e} bataillon « Tout le long du bois, j'ai baisé Jeannette, Tout le long du bois, j'l'ai baisé trois fois ! »
- 25^{e} bataillon « Pas plus con qu'un autre nom de nom, Mais toujours autant ! » (ou content)
- 26^{e} bataillon « Tu m'emmerdes et tu m'fais chier, tu m'dis ça c'est pour blaguer ! »
- 27^{e} bataillon « Si vous avez des couilles, il faudra le montrer ! »
- 28^{e} bataillon « Saut'Putten; t'auras d'la saucisse, Saut'Putten, t'auras du boudin ! »
- 29^{e} bataillon « C'est le Vingt-neuvième, qui n'a pas d'pain, Qui crève de faim, qui marche quand même ! »
- 30^{e} bataillon « Il était un p'tit homme, Tout habillé de bleu, nom de Dieu ! » (ou sacrebleu)
- 31^{e} bataillon « Trente-et-unième, l'dernier v'nu, Pas l'plus mal foutu ! »
- 32^{e} bataillon « Si j'avais du pinard, j'en boirais bien une goutte, si j'avais du pinard j'en boirai bien un quart ! »
- 40^{e} bataillon « Trou du cul de la reine des Hovas »

== Colours ==
There is a single colour for all the battalions of chasseurs; the colours are held at the Fort Neuf de Vincennes. The colour guard is divided between the 7th, 13th and 27th battalion, and with the 16th battalion which is a mechanized unit.

== Ranks ==
Shoulder ranks insigna

=== Enlisted & NCO ===
- Chasseur (Hunter/Private)
- Chasseur de 1ère Classe (1st class Hunter/Private 1st class)
- Caporal (Lance corporal)
- Caporal-Chef (Corporal)
- Caporal-Chef de 1ère Classe (Corporal 1st class)
- Sergent (Sergeant)
- Sergent-Chef (Staff sergeant)
- Adjudant (Warrant Officer 2nd class)
- Adjudant-Chef (Warrant Officer 1st class)
- Major (Conductor or Sergeant major)

=== Officers ===
- Aspirant (Cadet/Aspirant)
- Sous-Lieutenant (Second lieutenant)
- Lieutenant (First lieutenant)
- Capitaine (Captain)
- Commandant , also called Chef de bataillon (Major)
- Lieutenant-Colonel (Lieutenant colonel)
- Colonel (Colonel)

Note: the NCO ranks Brigadier and Maréchal-des-logis are not used in the chasseurs alpins corps since they belong to the infantry (and those ranks are not used within the infantry).

== Famous members ==
- Albert Severin Roche
- Yves Godard
- André Lalande

== Gallery ==
Portrait of chasseurs alpins soldier in World War I

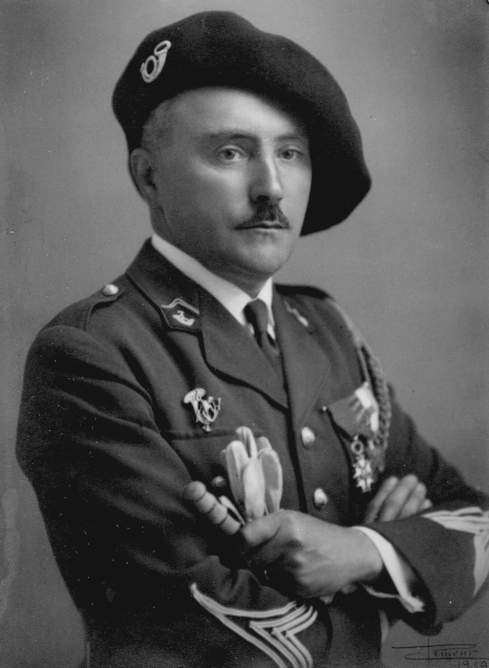
Commandant Soutiras, Officer of the chasseurs alpins

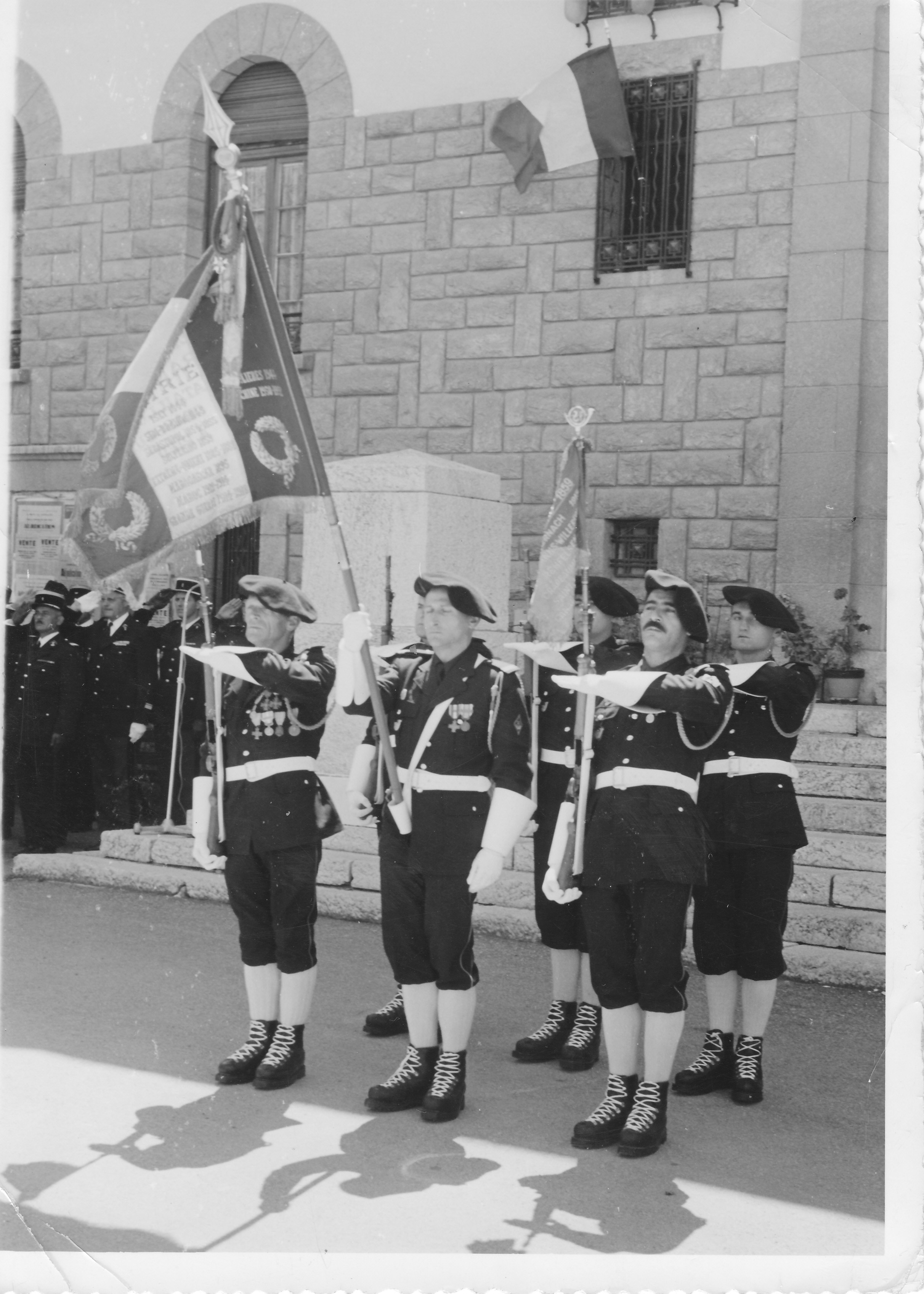
Flag guard of the chasseurs alpins (1970)

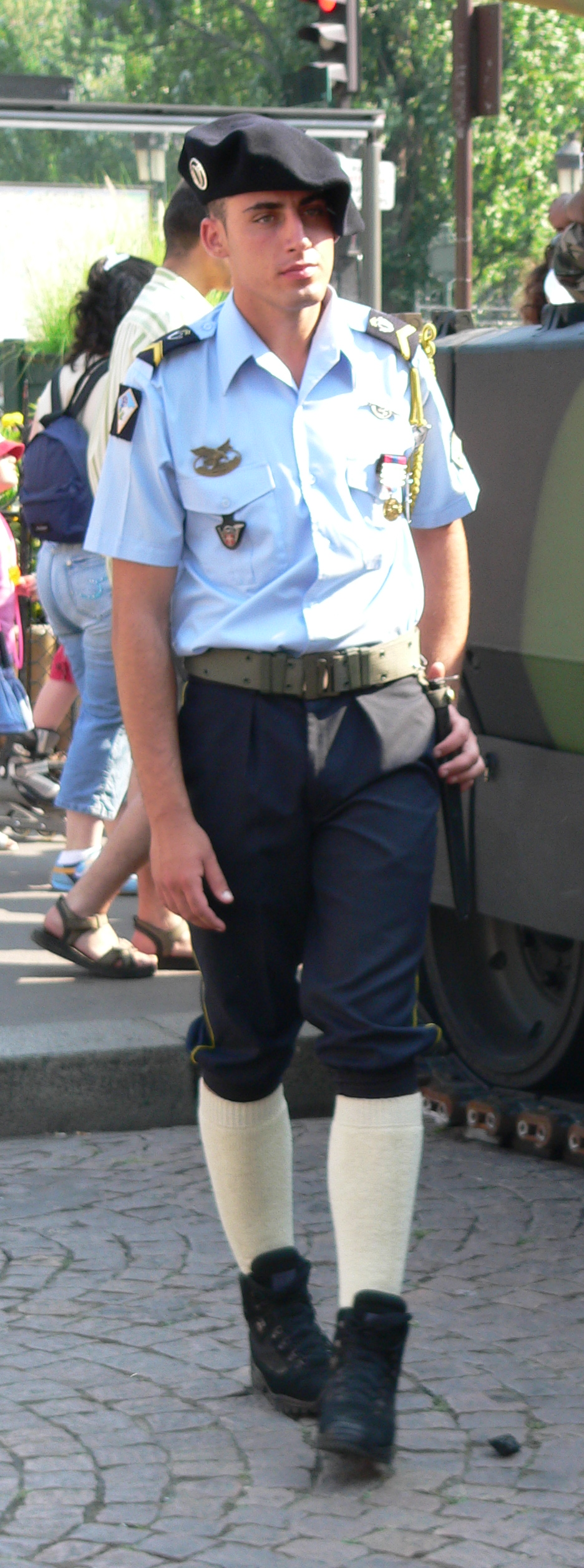
Dress uniform

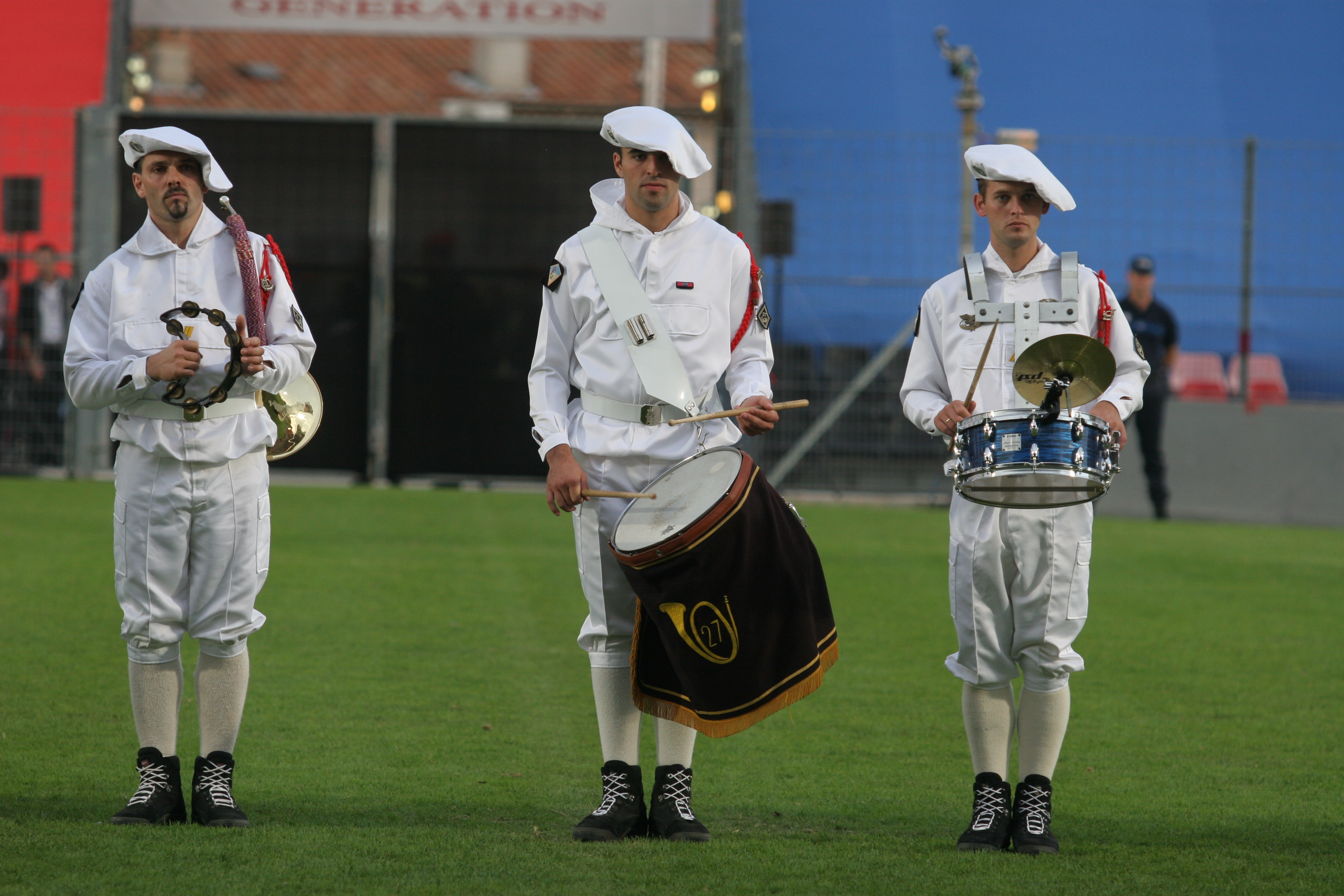
Soldiers in Winter uniform

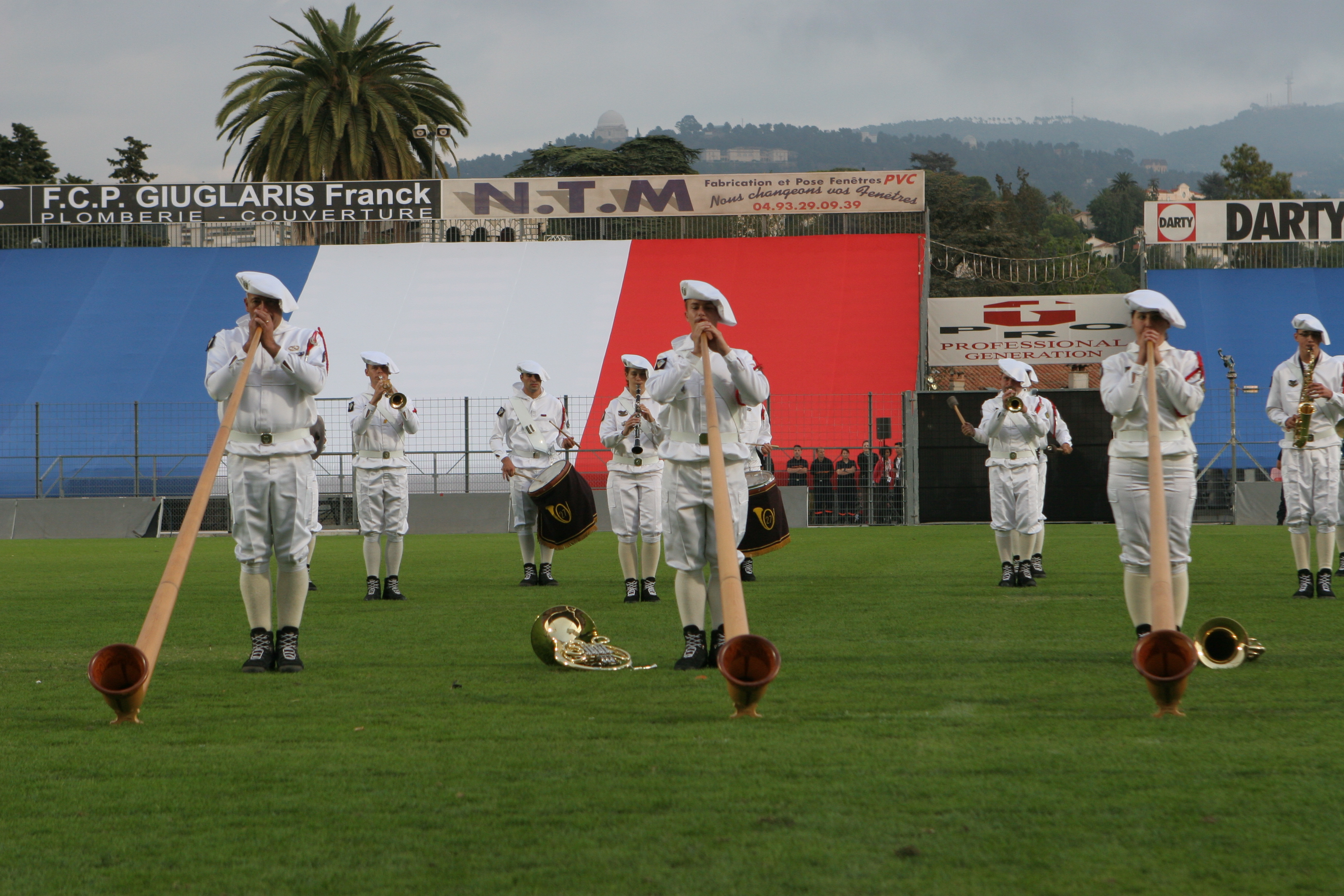
The band of the chasseurs alpins uses Alphorns

== See also ==
- List of mountain warfare forces
- Ski warfare
- French Armed Forces
- Argentina: Cazadores de Montaña (Argentine Army)
- Germany: Gebirgsjäger
- Italy: Alpini
- Poland: Podhale rifles
- Romania: Vânători de munte
- Duke Blue Devils, American college sports teams named after the chasseurs alpins
