= Jean Vallette d'Osia =

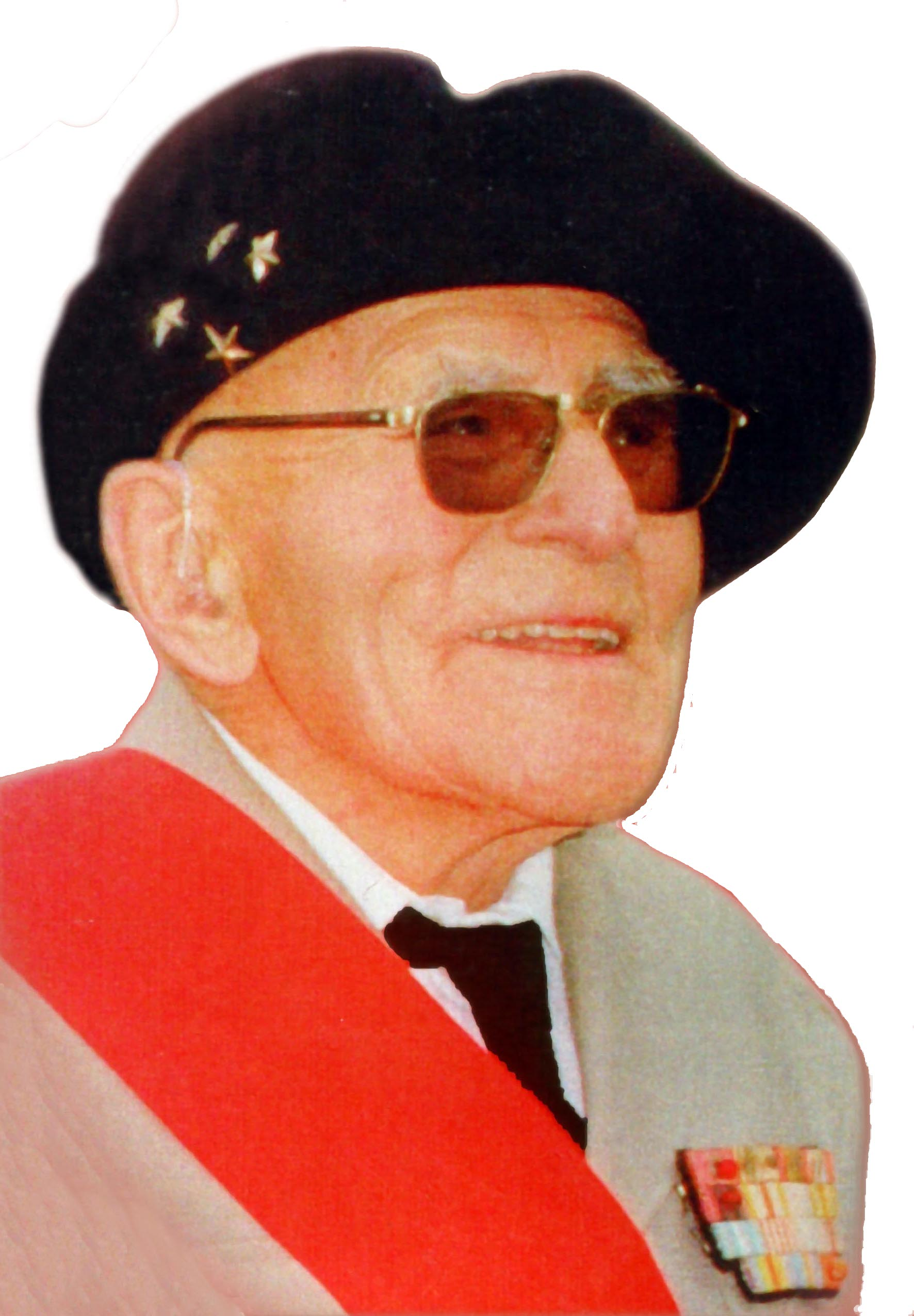
- Jean Vallette d'Osia, photographed in 1998
- Born: 16 August 1898; Rennes, France
- Died: 28 February 2000 (aged 101); Annecy-le-Vieux, France
- Military career
- Allegiance: France
- Branch: French Army
- Service years: 1917-1958
- Rank: Général de corps d'armée
- Conflicts: World War I; Rif War; World War II
- Awards: Grand Cross of the Legion of Honor

Jean Vallette d'Osia (16 August 1898 - 28 February 2000) was a French officer best known for his action in the French Resistance during World War II in Haute-Savoie, notably supervising the liberation of Lyon.

He ended his career in 1958 with the rank of Général de corps d'armée after having commanded the 27th Mountain Infantry Brigade.

Vallette d'Osia was also a staunch anti-communist and in later life linked to the far-right National Front.

== Honours ==
- Grand Croix de la Légion d'honneur (1978)
- Croix de guerre 1914-1918
- Croix de guerre 1939-1945
- Médaille de la Résistance
