= Battle of Alasay =

2009 battle

Coordinates: 34°53′45″N 69°43′15″E

Operation Dinner Out
- Part of the War in Afghanistan (2001–2021)
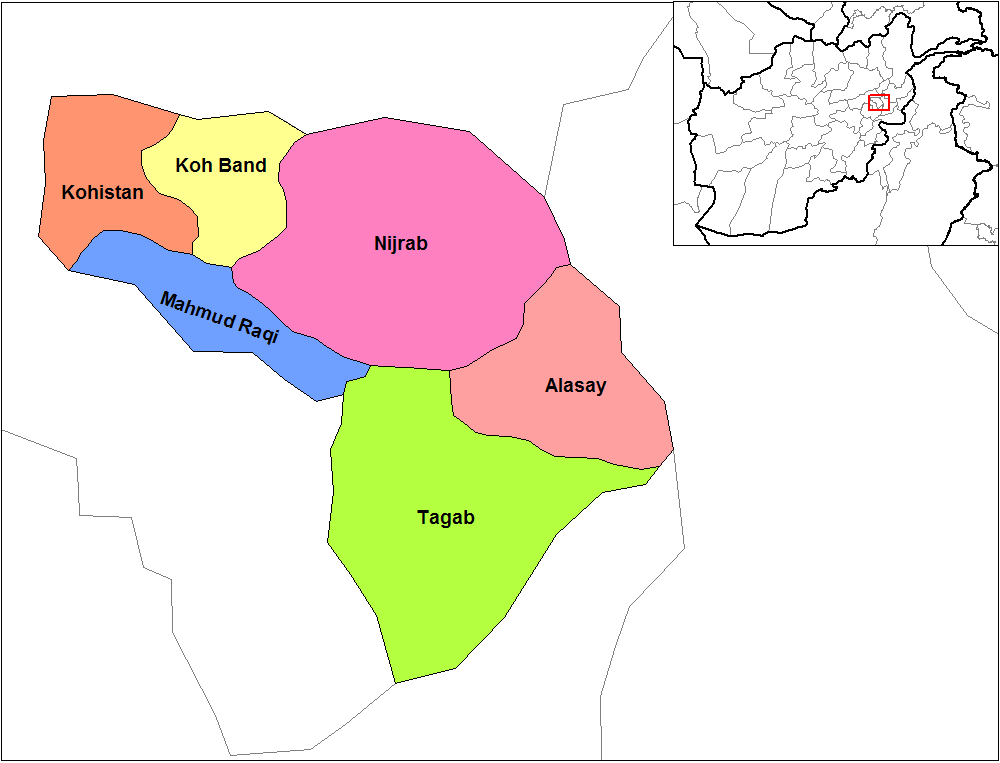
Date	14–23 March 2009
Location	Alasay, Kapisa Province, Afghanistan
Result	Coalition victory; Taliban retreat.

Belligerents
International Security Assistance Force: France; United States; Islamic Republic of Afghanistan	(Afghanistan) Taliban

Commanders and leaders
(France) Col Nicolas Le Nen (Afghanistan) Col. Hussein (United States) Lt Colonel Sean D Wester (USMC)	N/A

Strength
(France) 400 Chasseurs Alpins (Afghanistan) 400 men from the 1st Kandak	Around 400

Casualties and losses
(France) 1 killed (France) 1 wounded (Afghanistan) 6 wounded	35 killed 70 presumed killed 40 wounded 80 presumed wounded

The Battle of Alasay, codenamed Operation Dinner Out, was a military operation carried out by French troops of the Chasseurs Alpins's 27e Battalion and the Afghan National Army (ANA) 1st Kandak (battalion) between 14 and 23 March 2009. Marine Embedded Training Team 6-4, US Army Embedded Training Team 4-3-201, as well as other US units provided air support, both with attack helicopters and A-10 and F-15E strike aircraft. The operation enabled the construction of two bases for the Afghan Army in the Alasay valley, which had been under guerrilla control since 2006.

== Context ==
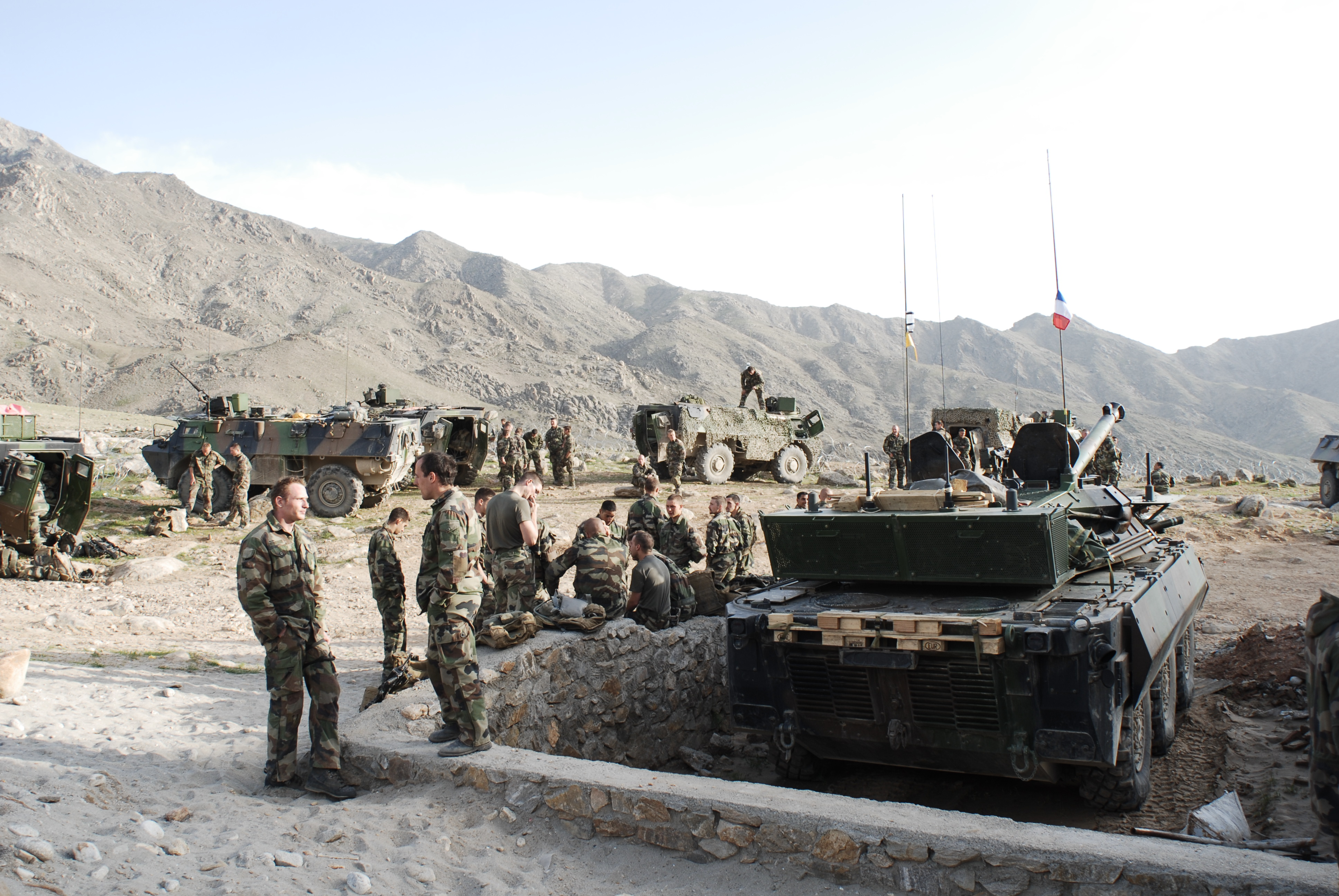
French troops and AMX-10 RC in the Alasai Valley, April 2009.

The sector of Alasay valley, in Kapisa Province, had been under guerrilla control since 2006. The ISAF decided to regain control of the sector. Given the proximity of two ISAF bases near the village of Nijrab and in Tagab, the French Groupement tactique interarmes de Kapisa (GTIA), harboured there, was tasked with the mission.

The GTIA is composed of

- the 27th chasseurs alpins Battalion (27 BCA)
- elements of the 93rd Mountain Artillery Regiment (93 RAM)
- elements of the 2nd Foreign Engineering Regiment (2 REG)
- elements of the 4th chasseurs regiment (4 RC)
- elements of the 28th Communication Regiment (28 RT).
- the Mountain Commando Group (GCM)

The 4th Company of the 27 RC received the callsign Vert ("Green"); it was composed of several section, label Vert 20, Vert 30, Vert 40. The 2nd Company received the callsign of Jonquille (Narcissus pseudonarcissus; by tradition, chasseurs alpins never utter the word "yellow", but use the colour of the plant as a metonymy).

The plan envisioned construction of two outposts for the Afghan Army.

== The battle ==
=== 14 March ===
At 4:30, the 4th company of the 27 BCA departed Nijrab in four CH-47 Chinook helicopters and occupied heights commanding the Southern region of Alasay valley, with Vert 10 directly above the points where the outposts were to be built; Vert 20 and Vert 30 covering the surrounding; and Vert 70 threatening the access path from the South.

Around the same time, elements of the Afghan Army, with several armoured vehicles and two battle tanks, approached their destination. They were supported by the 2nd Company of the 27 BCA and by the GCM. Over the following hours, two mortar sections of the 93 RAM, labeled Vert 60 and Jonquille 60, were installed South of Alasay valley, as forwards elements were now out of range for support from Tagab base.

At 7:17, elements of the Afghan Army came under fire; Jonquille 40 answered in kind, firing several Milan missiles. Four minutes later, Jonquille 20 found itself under sporadic dragunov fire, which stopped to reoccur half an hour later, without causing casualties.

Vert 30 was under fire, and called for air support, provided at 8:00 by elements of the US Air Force. Around the same time, three AMX-10 RC moved to the village of Shekut. Meanwhile, the 2nd company of the Afghan Army refused to move forwards; the captain was relieved of duty, the soldiers dispatched to other companies, and the 1st Afghan company took over, moving towards Alasay Valley.

It arrived 5 minutes later with the GCM and the AMX-10 RC, only to come under fire from two guerrilla units 600 metres away. These positions were pounded by the armoured unit and put out of action, allowing Jonquille 30 to close in and destroy it with small arm fire.

At 8:45, Jonquille 20 moved to support Jonquille 30 and provide assistance to two wounded of the Afghan Army. At the same time, guerrilla elements stormed the positions of Vert 30 and Vert 20, while US helicopters pounded caves occupied by the guerrilla.

At 9:30, Jonquille 30 sustained sniper fire, prompting the deployment of two 20mm-equipped VAB-C20 to complement Jonquille 20 and 30. During the following hours, several sporadic engagements took place around Alasay.

The French sustained their first casualty at 12:51, when a Milan operator of Vert 30 came under Dragunov fire and was wounded by shrapnel after the launcher was hit. The soldier was evacuated to Bagram at 14:41.

Between 15:00 and 15:30, guerrilla elements attempted to infiltrate between Vert 20 and Vert 30, but were prevented by small arms fire and air support. An apparent calm was then restored, though women were seen evacuating the sector.

At 18:00, guerrilla units showed themselves all around Alasay and stormed the village, while at the same time, Vert 20 and Vert 30 were also attacked; fighting lasted for one hour before the guerrilla broke contact under the cover of a hail of RPGs. One of the rockets hit a VAB-C20, killing the driver, Corporal Nicolas Belda.

Over the following hours, guerrilla elements retreated to the East, while the ISAF forces strengthened their positions. The dead and 5 Afghan Army wounded were evacuated at 22:10.

=== 15 March ===
From midnight, Vert 20 and 30 left the sector on foot, supported by the GCM, and rejoined Tagab.

At 6:47, Jonquille 30 destroyed a guerrilla group attempting to storm Alasay. At 7:00, elements of the Afghan Army arrived on BMP vehicles. One hour later, construction of the outposts began.

Vert 20 and 30 departed around 14:00.

=== 16 and 17 March ===
Late in the evening of the 16th, Vert 10 and Vert 70 departed by helicopter. The next day at 18:00, the outpost of Alasay was completed and construction of the second outpost began in Shekut.

== Aftermath ==
After the fighting had ended, several guerrilla groups were persuaded by local tribal elders to lay down their arms, in exchange for amnesty and cash incentives. While their long-term commitment to peace remained doubtful, the coalition offensive in Alasay, along with a government-sponsored reconciliation process, is said to have caused a clear improvement in the security situation, according to local leaders.
