= Yves Godard =

French Army officer

- Born: 21 December 1911; Saint-Maixent-l'École, France
- Died: 3 March 1975 (aged 63); Lessines, Belgium
- Military career
- Allegiance: France
- Branch: French Army
- Service years: 1932–1961
- Rank: Colonel
- Commands: 27e BCA; 11e Choc
- Conflicts: World War II First Indochina War: Operation Condor (1954); Algerian War: Battle of Algiers (1956–1957); Suez Crisis
- Awards: Commander of the Légion d'honneur
- Other work: OAS leader

Yves Godard (21 December 1911 – 3 March 1975) was a French Army officer who fought in World War II, First Indochina War and Algerian War. A graduate of Saint-Cyr and Chasseur Alpin, he served as a ski instructor in Poland during 1939, but after World War II began he returned to France. He became a prisoner-of-war in 1940 and tried several times to escape, finally succeeding on his third attempt. He made his way to France and joined the French Resistance maquis in Savoy. From December 1944 to February 1946, he headed the 27ème bataillon de chasseurs alpins.

He was part of the occupation force in Austria, then a general staff officer of the French Army before taking command of the 11e Bataillon Parachutiste de Choc in 1948. He led the battalion during the First Indochina War, taking part during the war in a failed attempted to relieve the French Union garrison at Dien Bien Phu from Laos. In 1955 Godard became chief of staff of the Parachute Intervention Group, soon to become the 10th Parachute Division, in Algeria commanded by General Jacques Massu. He took part in the Anglo-French operation during the Suez Crisis in 1956.

Godard became one of the primary figures of the Battle of Algiers, especially during the later part when he commanded the Algiers sector, supervising links between the Army and the Police, and serving as the chief of staff to Massu. At the suggestion of Captain Paul-Alain Léger, a former SAS-trained Jedburgh and a veteran of Indochina, he authorised the bleus-de-chauffe system, by which paratroopers and loyal Algerians disguised as young workers roamed the Casbah and arrested FLN militants. These tactics led to other complex infiltration operations. By planting believable evidence of fake betrayals, internal purges within the FLN emerged, spread and became viral. These purges resulted in hundreds, perhaps thousands, of self inflicted tortures and executions. Some claim that these tactics were responsible for more FLN victims than those from conventional warfare operations. Godard notably declared:

For 12 years we have been mired into subversive conflicts. Costly shows of force against terrorist organisation that we have, alas, let develop ... Faced with a rebel who fights camouflaged, cowardly, who attacks women and children, one must fight with new formulas.

In Summer 1959, he was named director general of the Sûreté in Algeria. Paul Delouvrier contemplated his transfer but hesitated, as "he holds all the security services of Algiers in his hands [and what would happen] if, immediately after his departure, bombs and grenades started exploding again?"

During the Barricade Week, in January 1960, Godard sent Captain Yves de La Bourdonnaye to negotiate Pierre Lagaillarde's surrender. La Bourdonnaye later implied that he was sympathetic to the rebels and had done little to hasten their surrender.

In February, Pierre Messmer had Godard transferred to France, but he returned to take part in the Algiers putsch of 1961. When the putsch failed, he joined the Organisation Armée Secrète, helping model it after the structure of the FLN, but left Algeria in the summer of 1962 and stayed underground until 1967. Godard was sentenced to death for his part in the putsch and OAS. He settled in Belgium, and unlike his OAS colleagues, he did not return to France after the 1968 amnesty. Godard died in 1975 at Lessines, Belgium, at 63.

== Decorations ==
- Commander of the Légion d'honneur
