= Paris massacre =

Paris massacre may refer to:

- Paris coup d'état and massacres of 1418
- St. Bartholomew's Day massacre (1572)
- September Massacres (1792)
- Massacre of the rue Transnonain (1834), during the Canut revolts
- Massacre of 14 July 1953 in Paris
- 1961 Paris massacre
- Charlie Hebdo shooting (2015)
- November 2015 Paris attacks

== See also ==
- Paris attacks
- The Massacre at Paris (1589), play by Christopher Marlowe
- The Massacre of Paris (1689), tragedy by Nathaniel Lee
