= Massacre of 14 July 1953 in Paris =

Bastille Day violence in Paris, France

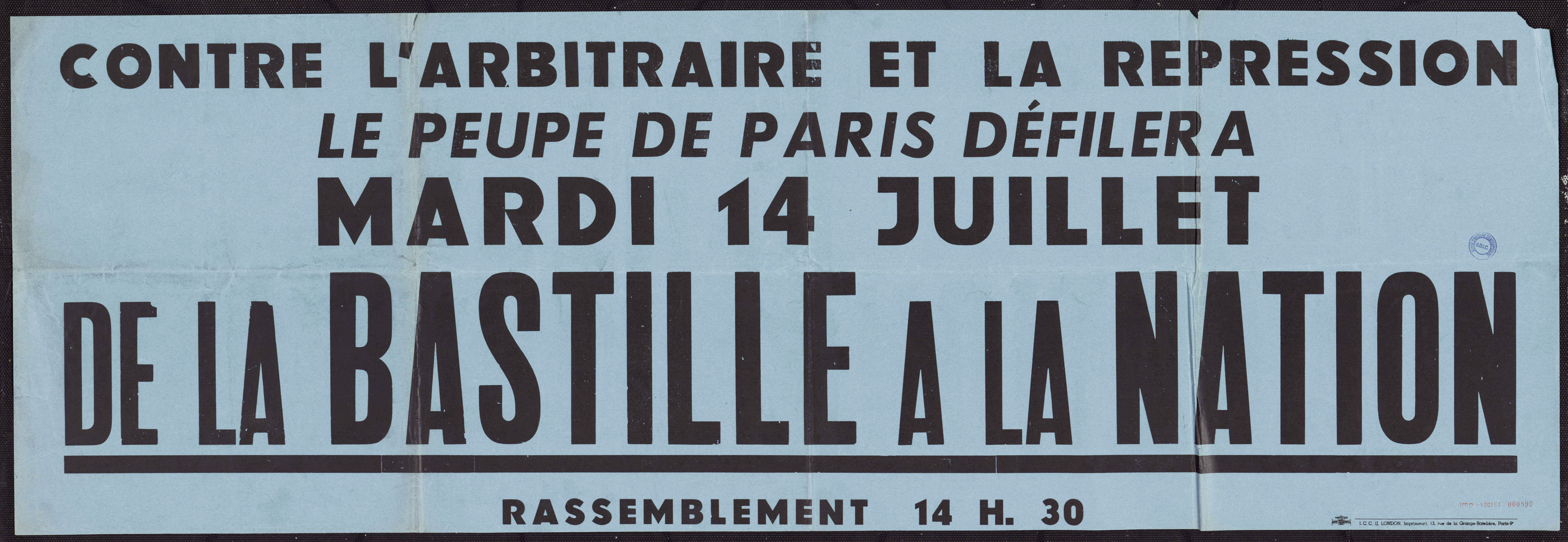
- Poster for the protest
- Location: 48.8474°N 2.3957°E; Pont Saint-Michel, Paris, France
- Date: July 14, 1953; 73 years ago
- Deaths: 7
- Injuries: 60 (48 protesters, 16 police officers)

The massacre of July 14, 1953 in Paris was an event in which the French police intentionally and without warning opened fire, causing 7 deaths (six Algerians and one French) and hospitalizing around 60 protesters and police officers. The incident occurred at the end of a parade organized by the French Communist Party (PCF) and the General Confederation of Labour (CGT) to celebrate the "values of the Republic" on the occasion of the French national holiday. It is part of the "massacres in Paris," including the massacre on February 6, 1934 (15 deaths), the massacre on October 17, 1961 (between 7 and over 200 deaths, according to different estimates), and the massacre at Charonne subway (9 deaths on February 8, 1962).

Between 10,000 and 15,000 people marched in the streets on July 14, 1953, with half of them being part of a significant Algerian procession of 6,000 to 8,000 individuals led by the Movement for the Triumph of Democratic Liberties (MTLD). Up until that point, the parade had been peaceful, but tragedy struck when the last protesters reached Place de la Nation. Within a few minutes, dozens of shots were fired at the MTLD procession.

Following the massacre, demonstrations on May 1 and July 14 were prohibited by the authorities for a period of 14 years, until the parade on May 1, 1968. This significant event also signaled the conclusion of the traditional popular parades held during the fête nationale française in the capital.

This tragedy, amid the repression of Algerian nationalism and serious events in Morocco and Tunisia, occurred a little over a year before the start of the Algerian War on November 1, 1954.

It wasn't until the early 2010s that the first books entirely devoted to this event appeared, and it was not until the commemoration of the 64th anniversary of the demonstration in 2017 that the Paris City Hall made the first official recognition of this massacre by placing a commemorative plaque on a building in Place de l'Île-de-la-Réunion.

== Historical context ==
=== Rising Algerian immigration ===
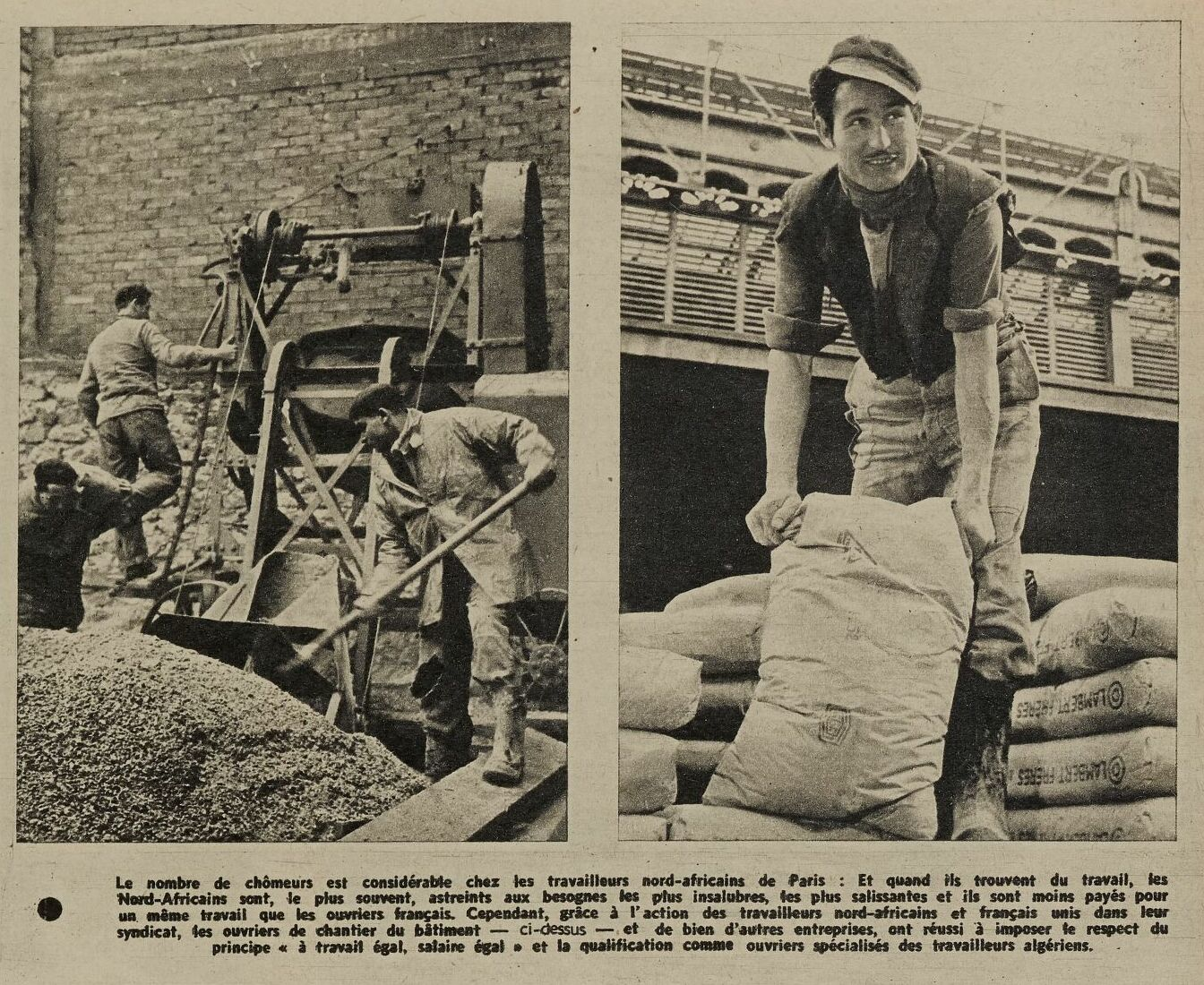
Dossier from the magazine Regards on the life of the Maghreb diaspora in the Paris region. It is issue number 339, dated February 15, 1952, and can be found on Gallica.

Algerian immigration experienced a significant increase just after World War II. The North African population in mainland France was estimated at 50,000 in 1946 and 400,000 in 1952, which represents eightfold growth in six years. Predominantly consisting of male workers, this population primarily worked in construction and metallurgy. However, they were accused of being involved in "more shameful trafficking" and blamed for increasing criminality, as certain sections of the press disseminated racist discourses such as, "Their morality is questionable. [...] They lack a sense of responsibility, their carelessness, their fatalism in these mines and steel mills, where death lurks from all sides, can lead to the worst disasters."

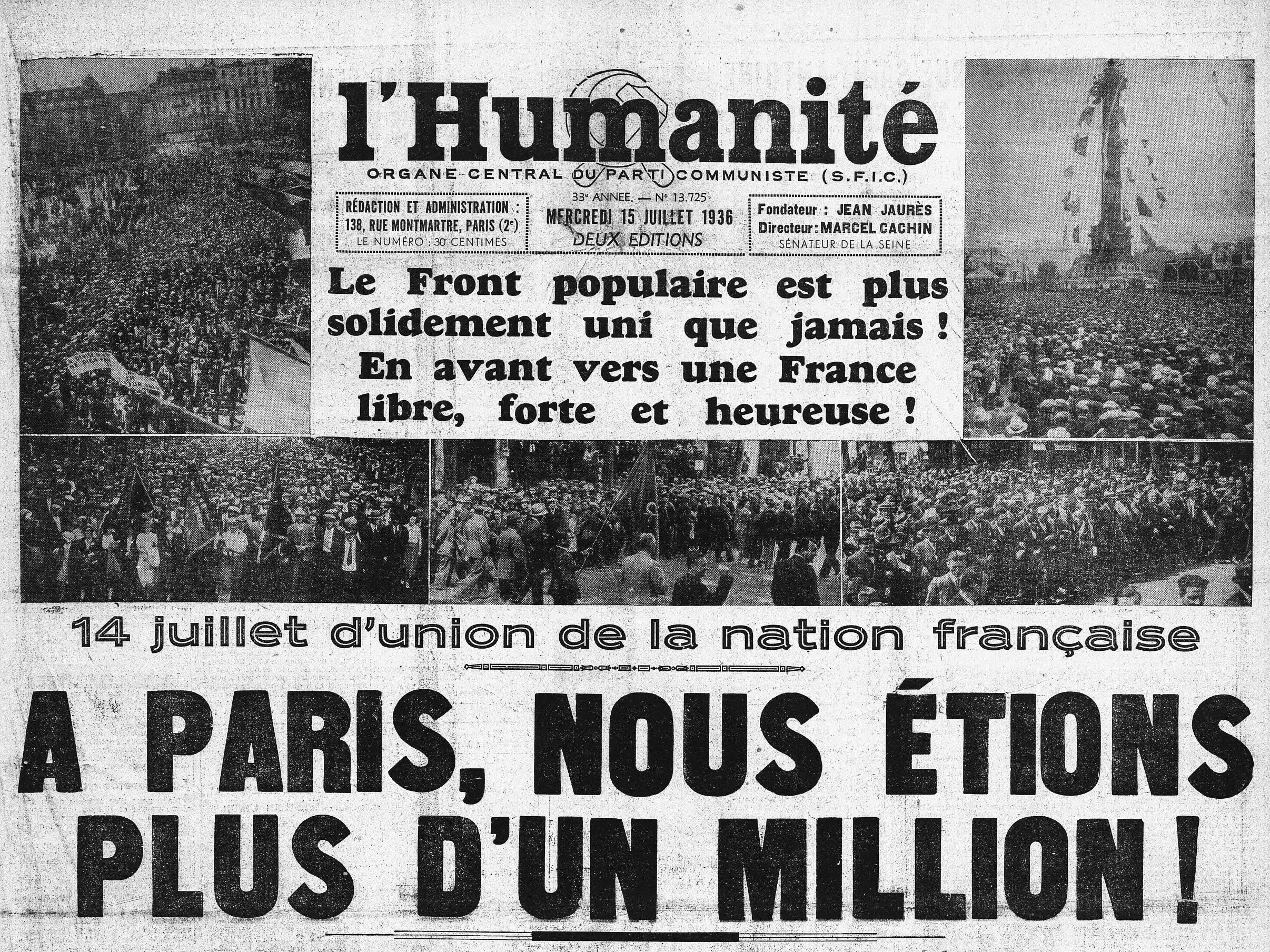
Coverage by L'Humanité newspaper of the popular parade on July 14, 1936.

=== Participation of MTLD in popular parades ===
Since 1936, with an interruption under Vichy and German occupation, the French Communist Party (PCF), the General Confederation of Labor (CGT), and various associated movements such as the League of Human Rights have organized a parade in Paris to celebrate the "values of the Republic" on the national holiday. And since 1950, the Algerian independence activists of the Movement for the Triumph of Democratic Liberties (MTLD), led by Messali Hadj, have taken part in the parade, despite their differences with the French Communists, who have not yet declared their support for Algerian independence, even though they demonstrated and went on strike in 1949-1950 for the independence of Indochina, at the initiative of the Indochinese Communists. The "Algerian" part of the parades quickly became very prominent, reaching one-third or even half of the May 1 parade in 1953, according to estimates.

Emmanuel Blanchard (Note: Emmanuel Blanchard is a French historian, political scientist, and lecturer. He is also a researcher at the Center for Sociological Research on Law and Criminal Institutions (CESDIP). Among his works is the book "La Police parisienne et les Algériens, 1944–1962," published in 2011.) recalls that during the demonstrations of the early 1950s, it was "difficult to distinguish among these protesters the Communist sympathizers from the Messalists."

Messali Hadj had created the MTLD in 1946 to serve as a legal cover for the Algerian People's Party, an independence organization banned in 1939, which had 20,000 militants in Algeria and 5,000 in metropolitan France in 1953. Their demands also concerned mainland France: wage equality, legalization of Muslim holidays, and an annual trip to North Africa.

While the Vietnamese fighting the Indochina War participated in demonstrations organized by the PCF and CGT, which also involved dockworkers in Oran or Casablanca, some Algerians in France were the only ones to resort to independent processions for their political demands. This activism was severely repressed, like the opposition to the Indochina War, through bans on demonstrations, police checks, and raids. Participating in these independent processions became a challenge for the MTLD, even though they disagreed with the organizers. They decided to participate, with their own demands, in the demonstrations on two symbolic dates in France: May 1 and July 14.

=== Three years of repression of Algerian activism ===
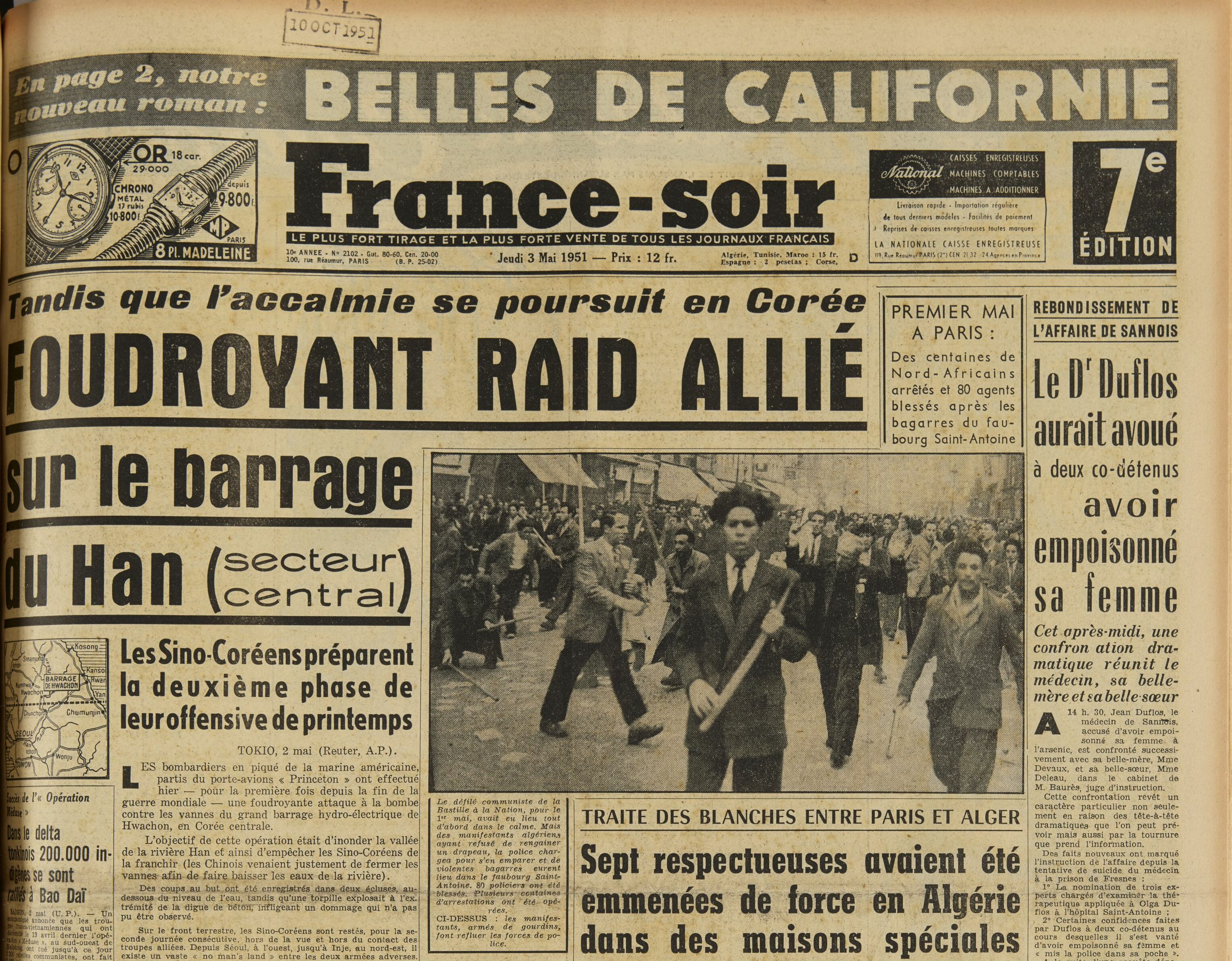
May 1, 1951, Manifestation. France-Soir dated May 3, 1951, on Gallica.

In September 1950, 3,000 Algerians protested outside the printing house of the National Press Enterprises located on Rue Réaumur, against the non-publication of the newspaper L'Algérie Libre. The prefecture of police announced the arrest of 1,127 protesters. In December, around thirty Algerians attacked the Belleville police station following the arrest of two individuals.

In April 1951, a demonstration by the MTLD was banned, and law enforcement forces caused several injuries while arresting 150 Algerians. The event was covered by journalist Madeleine Riffaud, who had been closely following the issue of immigrants in La Vie Ouvrière (CGT) alongside her partner at the time, Roger Pannequin. Both were former heroes of the Resistance and involved with the MOI (Main-d'Œuvre Immigrée) in the PCF (French Communist Party). Riffaud became associated with the MTLD led by Messali Hadj, and she attended meetings in Saint-Denis and near Place de la République. She took an interest in the condition of Algerian workers in France and embarked on a major investigation on the subject.

On May 1, significant Algerian processions were observed in Douai, Lens, Lille, Valenciennes, and, of course, Paris, where the MTLD marched for the second time in separate ranks but still within the general demonstration. Banners displayed the slogan "L'Algérie aux Algériens" ("Algeria for Algerians"). Madeleine Riffaud, who was gaining a significant reputation, wrote a report titled "Un 1er Mai historique" ("A Historic 1st of May").

Algerian flags were raised, leading to the intervention of law enforcement, resulting in 68 injuries and the arrest of hundreds of people. A police raid, a commonly used term at the time, was conducted on Algerian workers at Salle Wagram.

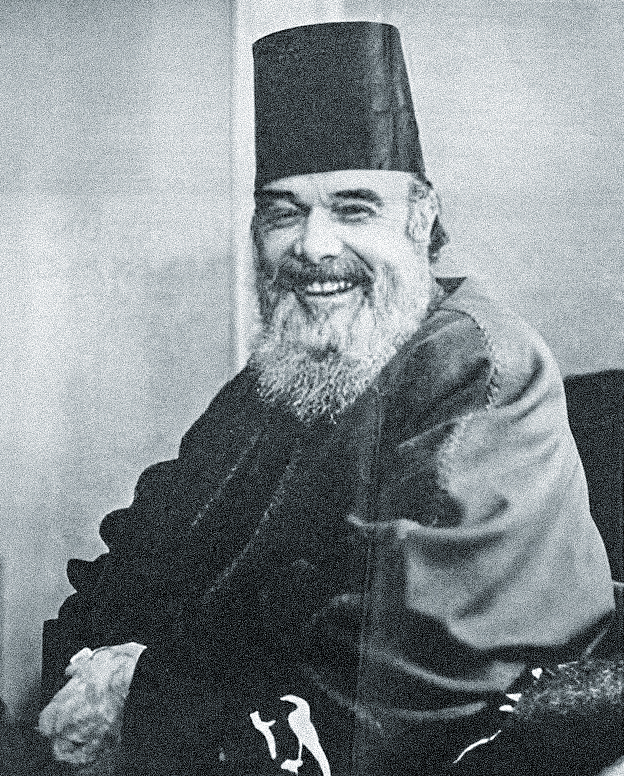
Portrait of Messali Hadj for the newspaper La Voix du Peuple.

In December, the MTLD planned to hold a meeting with representatives from Arab countries at the United Nations. The police carried out 5,900 arrests around the Vélodrome d'Hiver, near metro stations, and in the suburbs. Algerians were held and questioned for several hours in the former Beaujon hospital and Parc Monceau.

On May 1, 1952, the participation of Algerian workers was more significant. Law enforcement intervened again to confiscate banners calling for Algerian independence. The police even used firearms in Douai. On May 23, 300,000 Algerians went on strike to protest the police repression that occurred on May 14 in Orléansville, Algeria, where the police fired on the crowd with machine guns, resulting in two deaths and numerous injuries. In the evening, Messali Hadj was arrested and deported to mainland France, where he was placed under house arrest. Three Algerians were killed in Charleville, Le Havre, and Montbéliard, hundreds of people were injured, and dozens of arrests were made. On May 28, Algerian communist Hocine Bélaïd was killed near Place de Stalingrad during a demonstration against the visit of American General Matthew Ridgway, who was accused of using bacteriological weapons in the Korean War. In December, a new prohibited MTLD meeting at the Vélodrome d'Hiver led to 3,000 arrests in the Grenelle district.

On May 1, 10,000 Algerians participated in demonstrations in Douai, Lille, Paris, Valenciennes, and other cities. Police intervened in Anzin and Valenciennes to prevent protesters from raising the Algerian flag. Police charges resulted in around a hundred injuries and 200 arrests.

It is within this period marked by repression that the popular parade of July 14 takes place.

== Course of the demonstration ==
The military parade takes place in the morning on the Champs-Élysées, while the popular parade is organized in the afternoon under the guidance of the Peace Movement.

The Mouvement de la Paix, officially established in 1949, aims to unite peace supporters worldwide. In France, it receives support from the Communist Party.

According to the Paris Police Prefecture, the procession consists of 10,000 to 15,000 demonstrators, classifying the July 14, 1953, demonstration as a smaller-scale event.

The protesters follow a traditional route from Bastille to Nation through the rue du Faubourg Saint-Antoine.

=== Communist procession ===
The leading procession of the demonstration sets off around 3 p.m. Veterans march at the forefront, followed by General and Senator Ernest Petit, officers and non-commissioned officers, the Peace Movement, the Progressive Union, the People's Aid, the Union of Republican Youth of France, the Union of Communist Students, the Popular Music Federation with the Popular Chorus of Paris, the Union of French Women, CGT (General Confederation of Labor), Radio-Liberté, the Committee for the Defense of Democratic Liberties in Black Africa, British Democrats, and organizations from the Paris suburbs. The MTLD (Movement for the Triumph of Democratic Liberties) and the Paris Federation of the French Communist Party bring up the rear.

The main slogans of this procession are the defense of liberties (the procession carries a banner at its head saying "Union for the Defense of Republican Liberties"), the release of those imprisoned in Fresnes ("Free Henri Martin!"), and peace in Indochina.

=== Messalist Procession ===
The decision to march on July 14 was made on July 2 at the headquarters of the MTLD (Movement for the Triumph of Democratic Liberties). According to lawyer Amar Bentoumi, who would become the first Minister of Justice in Algeria in 1962, and historian Daho Djerbal, the Messalist demonstration was organized by Mohamed Boudiaf and Didouche Mourad, two of the six future founders of the National Liberation Front (FLN). The MTLD mobilized its forces for this demonstration by distributing 50,000 copies of the following leaflet:

On July 14th, all democrats commemorate the storming of the Bastille. July 14th has a significance, that of a blow struck against the repressive forces in 1789. That is why the MTLD calls on you to join the democratic demonstration at the Bastille on July 14th to uphold liberties in Algeria, demand the return of Messali Hadj to Algeria, the release of all Algerian political prisoners, and the cessation of prosecutions against Algerian nationals

— MTLD

The authorities were not idle either. On the eve of the demonstration, they made arrests in the Latin Quarter, including the arrest of the president of Algerian students. Leaflets were also distributed advising against attending the demonstration. Nevertheless, the supporters of the MTLD turned out in large numbers on July 14, 1954. The "Muslims of Algeria" numbered between 6,000 and 8,000, about a third of the demonstration, marching behind a large portrait of Messali Hadj, in close ranks, and most of them wearing their Sunday best. This second procession was composed of 6 sections, each consisting of about fifty ranks. Each rank comprised around ten demonstrators. The security service occupied 10 ranks at the front and rear of the procession. A total of 270 people secured the sides.

Messali Hadj's daughter, Djanina Messali-Benkelfat, who led the procession, described the parade to Daniel Kupferstein:

There was a sense of dignity and a will to be recognized in a just struggle... The young people were magnificent. Everyone was wearing a tie, even those in the security service, with armbands in the colors of Algeria, green with the flag in the middle, the crescent, and the star. It is the flag of Algeria. It should be known that this flag was made in 1935 – and it was my mother, Mrs. Messali, who made it at 6, rue du Repos (Paris XXe). It was the flag of the North African Star, then of the Algerian People's Party (PPA) and the PPA-MTLD, and later the flag of the FLN

— Djanina Messali-Benkelfat

This procession, described as spectacular by intelligence services, set off at 4 pm, while the head of the communist procession arrived at Place de la Nation. The end of the Algerian procession left Bastille around 4:30 p.m.

The MTLD's executive committee issued three main slogans for this demonstration:

- Respect for democratic liberties in Algeria ("Down with police racism," denunciation of "police provocations in North Africa", "Put an end to the colonialist repression of the Union of French Democrats and North African patriots.").
- Return of Messali Hadj to Algeria and release of all political prisoners ("Enough sanctions against Algerian political prisoners!" "Free Messali Hadj! Free Bourguiba!").
- Cease the prosecutions against Algerian nationalist leaders.

Within the procession, there were also economic and social demands ("Equal pay for equal work," "Social benefits for all, extension of social security in Algeria"). The intelligence services noted the absence of nationalist or separatist demands and banners, but the crowd still chanted anti-colonial slogans ("We want independence!" "Down with colonialism").

=== Official Tribune ===
A tribune is set up in Place de la Nation to accommodate around a hundred personalities who are part of the organizing committee or representatives of organizations in the street: Emmanuel d'Astier de la Vigerie, Admiral Moullec, Abbé Pierre, Jacques Leman, Marcel Cachin, Waldeck Rochet, Florimond Bonte, Georges Cogniot, General Ernest Petit, Léon Mauvais, Pastor Bosc, Charles Palant (MRAP), and academics Georges Astre, Georges Gaillard, Madeleine Rebérioux, and M.A. Roussel.

=== Law enforcement ===
The prefect of police at the time is Jean Baylot, and Maurice Papon is the secretary general of the Paris Police Prefecture.

In a circular dated July 11, the Paris Police Prefecture orders strictness towards Algerian nationalists: "No banner or sign with an inscription (in French or a foreign language) that would be insulting to the government or its representatives, as well as to a foreign government or its representatives, shall be carried by the demonstrators. No seditious cries or songs shall be uttered."

2,200 police officers and mobile gendarmes were mobilized for the occasion, while the authorities were expecting 10,000 demonstrators. They were positioned in Place de la Bastille and the adjacent streets of Place de la Nation. 800 men were kept in reserve in case the situation escalated. Three centers were prepared to arrest 1,150 people. Additionally, 12 Arabic-speaking interpreters were present, indicating that the authorities anticipated a significant Algerian mobilization and numerous arrests within this second procession. The reading of the RG (General Intelligence) files reveals that the law enforcement had reports of preparatory meetings of the MTLD held at the headquarters on Rue Xavier Privas in the days preceding the demonstration.

=== Attack by Paratroopers at Bastille ===
The demonstration proceeds well, except for some clashes with French soldiers. A group of paratroopers returning from Indochina on leave in Paris disrupts the demonstration by attacking the protesters multiple times. The peace officer Gaston Thiénard reports the presence of Jacques Sidos among the troublemakers. Sidos, a supporter of Marshal Pétain, founded the neo-fascist movement Jeune Nation in 1949.

At the corner of Place de la Bastille and Rue du Faubourg-Saint-Antoine, paratroopers on leave attack the demonstrators but are beaten up and leave with 6 injured. Other attacks are carried out by the same paratroopers, each time being escorted out of the route by the police, who make no arrests. The archives of the Paris Police Prefecture mention 6 lightly injured paratroopers transported to Bégin Hospital and about twenty paratroopers taken back to their barracks at Porte de Versailles.

In a leaflet, the French Communist Party (PCF) of Val de Grâce criticizes the fact that the police "protected groups of provocateurs who had unsuccessfully attempted to disrupt the processions at several points."

== Bloody end to the demonstration ==
Apart from these incidents, the communist and trade union march traditionally organized after the official parade on the Champs-Élysées has been described as family-friendly and peaceful so far. No clashes between the protesters and law enforcement have been reported. Nonetheless, the police open fire on the procession of Algerian nationalists upon its arrival at the Place de la Nation.`

=== Official version ===
On the evening of July 14, the Paris Police Prefecture issued an official statement justifying the police officers' firing of shots in the name of self-defense for law enforcement personnel :

The procession, which marched from Bastille to Nation, consisted of 10,000 demonstrators this year. Nearly half of them were North Africans, who formed the final part of the parade. Upon reaching the columns of the Throne, the dispersal of the European elements took place without incident. On the contrary, the North Africans decided to continue their demonstration along the course of Vincennes. The on-duty commissioner, alone and wearing a kepi, invited the leaders of the demonstrators' groups to respect the order of dispersal.

It was then that around 2,000 North Africans, seizing any projectiles within their reach (cobblestones, iron bars, tables, and chairs), and some armed with knives, brutally attacked the small number of present officers. Three parked police vehicles were overturned and set on fire in various locations. Suddenly surrounded and in a state of legitimate defense, a few officers had to use their weapons.

Among the security forces, there were 82 injured, including 19 seriously wounded who were hospitalized. On the side of the demonstrators, 44 injuries were reported, and 7 deaths occurred. The riot, which began at 5:15 PM, was quickly brought under control, and calm was completely restored by 6 PM.

— Paris Police Prefecture

== Events ==
Right-wing media outlets are echoing this version. Reports from the commissioners mention the presence of weapons (bottles, iron bars, pieces of wood, knives) among the Algerian procession. Several commissioners even mention gunfire within the ranks of the protesters. In his report addressed to the prefect, the director of the municipal police services concludes that the Algerians carried out a premeditated operation. Testimonies from law enforcement officers published in the press or found in police archives indicate that the Algerians violently attacked the police forces while attempting to continue the demonstration along the course of Vincennes.

However, decades later, the versions are changing and contradicting the official version. Daniel Kupferstein was able to gather two testimonies from police officers. The Algerian protesters did not carry weapons, and these testimonies confirm that the police officers charged at the protesters. This leads Daniel Kupferstein to speak of a state lie. Historian Danielle Tartakowsky refers to a "self-censorship rewriting" because the minutes written by these commissioners stationed at the demonstration describe a situation completely different from the accounts written later by the commissioners.

=== Protesters' version ===
The documentary research conducted over several years by Daniel Kupferstein was unable to establish the facts precisely when the clashes began at the moment of the dispersal of the demonstration. There are divergent versions: one suggests that the law enforcement intervened in response to the display of an Algerian flag, while another claims that the procession left the designated area without dispersing. However, the numerous testimonies collected by the filmmaker contradict the official version provided by the police. Physicist André Kahane, who was a student at the École Normale Supérieure at the time of the events, stated that he witnessed "police officers rushing out of Rue des Grands-Champs and opening fire on the crowd from a distance of thirty meters, while the crowd could only defend itself with sticks, banners, and wooden barriers".

The articles published by the left-wing press in the aftermath of the massacre report similar events. In L'Humanité :

The communists of the 18th arrondissement sing La Marseillaise, just as police officers emerge from the adjacent streets, striking the demonstrators and venting their anger on the portrait of Messali Hadj. Initially taken by surprise, the Algerians retreated, but then regrouped, and it was at that moment that the first gunshots rang out. An enormous cry of indignation erupted from thousands of chests: 'Assassins! Assassins!' And also: 'Fascism shall not pass!' Republican figures joined their voices with the immense crowd of Parisians to sing a stirring Marseillaise. Atrocious scenes were unfolding.

— L'Humanité

A brief confrontation with the police takes place at Place de la Nation, where the demonstration disperses. However, the procession of the MTLD (Messali Hadj's nationalist party) continues to march and disperse a little further. According to other sources, the protesters head towards Avenue du Trône to deposit signs and flags in the MTLD truck. In the rain, the police intentionally and without warning open fire on them. It appears that the decision to fire came from the ranks rather than from the hierarchy. From 5 p.m. to 5:30 pm, Algerians use barriers to confront the police, and at least 2 police cars are set on fire.

The exact circumstances of the repression of the July 14, 1953, demonstration are not yet fully known, particularly regarding the trigger of the events. Historian Emmanuel Blanchard confirms that Algerian flags and portraits of Messali Hadj were displayed, but this was not uncommon in metropolitan France. "And until then, they were not shot at, at least not in Paris!" According to Blanchard, the repression was not planned. "It was a response from the peacekeepers who decided on their own to 'teach a lesson' to the Algerians," without any order to open fire. He adds :

It is important to recall that while this event was unprecedented from the perspective of Paris, it was somewhat common in the colonies for a long time. But what is uncommon is that it took place on July 14, in Place de la Nation. And what is even more uncommon is that French police officers behaved like the French army of the late 19th century when they fired at workers, or like their colleagues in all colonial countries when the colonized people challenged colonial domination.

— Emmanuel Blanchard

According to historian Danielle Tartakowsky, "While one death could be attributed to a 'blunder,' it is difficult to attribute seven deaths to such a cause... Without necessarily imagining explicit orders, here or in other subsequent circumstances, the political climate and racism at play lead to 'slip-ups' that, when they multiply, can no longer be qualified as such."

The demonstration was very closely watched by the authorities; "offensive" signs, flags, and banners had been banned by the prefecture of police, along with "seditious" songs and chants. The march was to follow a traditional course, travelling from Place de la République to Place de la Nation. However, when it reached the Rue du Faubourg-Saint-Antoine, some off-duty paratroopers in uniform attacked the demonstrators; the paratroopers were beaten back by the demonstrators, and six were wounded. The paratroopers continued their aggression against the demonstrators; the police removed them each time, but made no arrests.

The demonstrators clashed with police at Place de la Nation, where most of the protesters dispersed. The parade planned by the MTLD continued somewhat farther in spite of heavy rain, as some marchers went toward Avenue du Trône to drop their signs and flags in an MTLD truck.

There, and without warning, the police opened fire on them on their own initiative without direction from their command. This escalated the violence; the Algerian demonstrators used barricades to attack the police and burned at least two police cars between 5:00 pm and 5:30 pm. Seven people were killed: six French workers from Algeria, and one worker from metropolitan France, who was a member of the General Confederation of Labour. Besides the deaths, over 50 demonstrators were injured, at least 40 by gunshots. About fifty police officers were injured: between three and five by stabbing, and the remainder by makeshift weapons.

== Aftermath ==
The human toll of the declared demonstration is particularly heavy, with 7 people killed by gunfire and 48 injured. In terms of material damage, it is estimated that around twenty police vehicles were damaged, including at least two that were set on fire.

=== Protesters killed ===
The heaviest toll is among the ranks of the protesters. There are 7 individuals who were fatally shot, declared dead at various hospitals in the Paris region between 5:40 PM and 8:30 PM.

=== Protesters injured by bullets ===
Counting the injured proves to be a complex task. Based on the investigative file of the Court of Appeals and the archives of the Paris Police Prefecture, Emmanuel Blanchard has meticulously recorded 47 protesters who sustained injuries due to police gunfire. In addition to these cases, L'Algérie libre mentions two other individuals, Vasvekiazan with a head injury and Cyprien Duchausson with an injured hand, who were admitted to Saint-Antoine Hospital. However, Emmanuel Blanchard was unable to obtain further information about these incidents. Daniel Kupferstein, on the other hand, reports a total of 48 injured individuals during the 70th commemoration.

The number of gunshot injuries is certainly underestimated. Some Algerians preferred to avoid seeking treatment in hospitals for fear of being arrested, while others went but remained anonymous, as indicated by Charles Palant: "A comrade guided me to a hospital in Saint-Denis. Apparently, there were acquaintances there who could both treat these injured individuals and preserve their anonymity." There are also numerous injuries from baton strikes. The police made no arrests during the demonstration.

=== Police officers injured ===
On the law enforcement side, the official report states that 82 police officers were injured, including 19 peacekeepers who were hospitalized. The investigation file now indicates only 52 minor injuries that did not require sick leave. As of July 15, there were 16 police officers hospitalized at the Maison de santé des gardiens de la paix or at the Hôtel-Dieu. On July 18, there were 11 hospitalized police officers. By July 30, there were only 4 seriously injured police officers still hospitalized. No hospitalized police officer was hit by gunfire. Additionally, several vehicles were destroyed.

=== Photographer injured ===
The photographer of the newspaper Parisien libéré, Robert Trécourt, was struck by peacekeepers and his photographic equipment was broken. In his supplementary report addressed to the Director General of Municipal Police, Commissioner André Bondais stated that he encountered the photographer, but "he did not show any signs of being hit and never claimed to have been struck."

== Next days ==
=== Aid to the injured and fraternization ===
The nearest hospitals are full (Saint-Antoine, Saint-Louis, Tenon, Rothschild), and the wounded are being sent further away, such as Lariboisière Hospital or the Franco-Muslim Hospital in Bobigny. A significant solidarity movement towards the injured is being organized:

The next day, I think the police wanted to take us back, and the hospital staff – doctors, nurses – communists, and MTLD militants came to block them. They prevented them, maybe they wanted to arrest us? Afterwards, we received packages, assistance from French people. The solidarity was very strong. Many French people brought us things. There was even a French pied-noir from Oran who showed solidarity and sent us a package. We all had French friends. We weren't anti-French, we were against colonialism. There's a difference, a big difference.

— Abdelhamid Mokrani

Fraternization demonstrations emerge throughout the Paris region from the evening of the tragedy. The Vincennes section of the French Communist Party distributes 2,000 copies of a leaflet calling on the population to unite "so that the French police no longer shoot at the French people." 800 people observe a minute of silence at a ball on Île Saint-Louis. The same is observed at the Fontenay-sous-Bois ball. The balls at Butte-aux-Cailles (13th arrondissement), Place Jeanne d'Arc, Marx Dormoy (18th arrondissement), Place de la Réunion (20th arrondissement), and Champigny are stopped as a sign of mourning.

=== Police relentlessness ===
If the police make no arrests during the parade, Libération mentions "anti-Algerian roundups in the Paris region" in the following days. Police raids are organized in the neighborhood of La Goutte d'Or, where a significant community of Algerian immigrants resides. On July 15, activists Henri Girault, Henri Polard, and Fernand Werthée are arrested while distributing leaflets titled "Workers Murdered on July 14th." They are fined 6,000 francs for distributing leaflets that were signed but without specifying the printer's name. On July 19, a police officer fires twice at an Algerian MTLD militant who was distributing leaflets.

=== Funerals ===
The bodies of the Algerian victims are transported to the Great Mosque of Paris for a religious ceremony. Thousands of Parisians come to pay their respects in front of the lead-sealed coffins of the victims, including Laurent Casanova and Léon Feix from the PCF, Boumendjel Ahmed from the Democratic Union of the Algerian Manifesto, Alice Sportisse from the Algerian Communist Party, Abdelkader Cadi, Lakhdar Brahimi, Yves Dechezelles from the Congress of Peoples against Imperialism, Louis Massignon, a professor at the Collège de France, Charles-André Julien, a professor at the Sorbonne and member of the France-Maghreb Committee, Claude Bourdet from L'Observateur, Georges Suffert from Témoignage Chrétien, Albert Béguin from the journal Esprit.

The next day, the six coffins are exhibited at the Maison des Métallos, draped in black for the occasion. In the afternoon, Maurice Lurot is buried in the Père-Lachaise Cemetery.

Four Algerian victims can be immediately transferred to Algeria. Abdallah Bacha will be buried in Bahalil (Wilaya of Bouira), Abdelkader Draris in Djebala (Wilaya of Tlemcen), and Tahar Madjène in Guergour (Wilaya of Bouira). The body of Amar Tadjadit was allegedly stolen from his family by French soldiers and buried "in a showy manner," according to L'Humanité on July 26. Due to administrative reasons, the bodies of Larbi Daoui and Mouhoub Illoul had to be buried in the Muslim section of the Bobigny cemetery.

The PCF organizes a tribute meeting for the victims on July 21, 1953, at the Cirque d'Hiver, bringing together several thousand people. Among the speakers were Eugénie Cotton, Dr. Benjamin Ginsbourg, President of the Movement against Racism and Anti-Semitism, Pastor Jean Bosc, Henri Raynaud from the CGT, Georges Cogniot, etc.

=== Reactions ===
In the days following the bloody incident, the French Communist Party (PCF) denounces "the deliberately provocative nature of the July 14th shooting against a regularly authorized parade" and affirms "that the police prevented the normal dislocation of part of the procession and the peaceful flow of Algerian demonstrators along the Cours de Vincennes." The co-organizer of the demonstration calls for increasing actions to obtain "severe punishment for the culprits."

==== Unions and Organizations ====
Several unions publicly react. The Association of Vietnamese Workers in France, the Parisian branch of the FO union for social security organizations, the Inter-Union Committee of the Parisian Book, the National Education Federation, the CFTC Renault union, the departmental unions CGT and FO of Loire Atlantique express their support for the victims of police repression. André Tollet, the secretary of the Union of Trade Unions in the Paris region, emphasizes that "racism is a weapon of the enemy" in Le Peuple, the bi-monthly organ of the CGT, dated August 1. Protest actions are carried out, particularly in the mining basin, ports, and metallurgy companies in Nord-Pas-de-Calais.

At the national level, only the CGT accuses the police forces. In La Vie ouvrière, the CGT's organ, Édouard Storace emphasizes that "it is the same blood they have shed, these brothers of the same struggle, fallen under the same bullets, deadly bullets of police officers protecting the privileges of modern slave traders, billionaire capitalists enriched by the sweat and blood of the people."

For Force ouvrière, which emerged from a split with the CGT in 1947, "Stalinism and nationalism were combined at Place de la Nation. Together, they easily created a detonating mixture. The fatal, blameworthy, deplorable junction."

The Union of Parisian CFTC Unions regrets that "this day, which was supposed to be the expression of all freedoms and the unity of all French people, was marked by violence and brutality," but emphasizes that it is "always opposed to the exploitation, for the purpose of political agitation, of the difficult living conditions of workers, especially North Africans."

Several organizations denounce police violence: the Cercle Zimmerwald in Niort (where Messali Hadj is confined to residence), the Action Committee of Intellectuals for the Defense of Liberties, the France-Maghreb Committee, the Arab Maghreb Liberation Committee, Algerian students in Paris, the LICA, and the MRAP.

==== Personalities ====
In the days following the massacre, L'Humanité collects the opinions of several personalities. Abbé Pierre, who was in the official stand at Place de la Nation, declares, "They are afraid of unity for freedom and bread. They resort to brutal force. Shame on them!" Writer Michel Leiris declares that he is "sickened to the point of nausea by this habit, now established in France, of turning popular demonstrations into pogroms against North Africans." Historian Louis de Villefosse laments that "Algerians are practically treated as foreigners on their own soil, deprived of all political freedoms and all social rights guaranteed by the Constitution." Other personalities deplore the police intervention: Dr. Georges Bourguignon, member of the Academy of Medicine, former governor of the Bank of France Émile Labeyrie, writer Jean Cau.

In contrast, L'Aurore collects testimonies calling for an end to the Algerian problem. According to Deputy Joseph Denais, "we must stop allowing so many Algerians to come to Paris." Deputy Robert Mondon shares this view. According to Deputy André Hugue, "a distinction must be made between North Africans who have been living in France for a long time and who work normally, and these commandos that some political parties exploit."

In Libération, the Action Committee of Intellectuals for the Defense of Liberties believes that "everything is happening as if they wanted to force North African workers to give up any public demonstration."

Artists Jacques Prévert, Yves Montand, and Simone Signoret will send messages of solidarity to be read during the protest meeting organized at the Cirque d'hiver on July 21.

==== Press ====
Maurice Rajsfus, Jacques Simon, and Daniel Kupferstein document the media coverage of the time in their respective works.

===== Press in France =====
The treatment varies greatly depending on the publications. For some, it is seen as repression, while others view it as simply maintaining order. Unlike the massacre of October 17, 1961, the press at the time extensively covered the events of 1953 but in terms that scandalized Albert Camus, who sent a letter to the newspaper Le Monde:

When one observes that most newspapers (yours being among the exceptions) cover with the modest term 'brawls' or 'incidents' a small operation that cost seven lives and over a hundred injured, when one sees our parliamentarians, eager to run to their parishes, hastily disposing of these inconvenient dead, one is justified, it seems to me, in wondering if the press, the government, and the Parliament would have shown such casualness if the demonstrators had not been North Africans, and if, in the same case, the police would have fired so confidently. It is clear that they would not have, and that the victims of July 14 were also somewhat killed by racism that dares not speak its name

— Albert Camus, Le Monde, July 19–20, 1953

The event is featured on the front page until Maurice Lurot's funeral, after which it is relegated to the inner pages until the end of July, before being replaced by the Indochina War and the August 1953 strikes, the largest public service strikes since the Liberation.

The right-wing popular press adopts the official version. According to L'Aurore, it is "a commando of North Africans, fanatical and filled with anti-French propaganda, turning a neighborhood in Paris into a battlefield." Le Parisien libéré refers to it as "a surge of rage, an unleashing of murderous instincts that strangely recalled, in its suddenness, its irrationality, the recent troubles in Casablanca." Although it agrees with the official thesis of an initial aggression by North Africans, Le Parisien libéré nevertheless denounces the behavior of the police towards one of its photographers, Robert Trécourt. Le Figaro points the finger at the responsibility of Communist leaders in the deaths of the seven protesters and speaks of a "howling mob" that forced the police to use their weapons. France-Soir provides a detailed account of the events. The evening newspaper, which had a circulation of one million copies at the time, remains neutral. Maurice Rajsfus highlights that "from reading its article, one cannot know whether the Algerians are retaliating to a police attack, merely defending themselves, or deliberately attacking this security service, which is not innocently present and has refrained from targeting Communist and union elements in the procession."

Le Monde adopts a nuanced or ambiguous position, holding the police and organizers responsible for the massacre: "It is up to the organizers of the demonstration as well as the chief of police to draw lessons from this bloody and unnecessary collision," while emphasizing that "the origins of the incident remain obscure" in its July 16 issue. The MTLD is also presented as "the most extremist of genuinely Algerian parties."

On the left-wing side of the press, L'Humanité extensively covers the event (two to four pages) and features it on the front page until July 25, then in the inner pages until July 31. The newspaper of the French Communist Party (PCF) reports on the event with many details and criticizes police repression: "Just as the compact, disciplined group of Algerians, having passed the platform, was heading towards Avenue du Trône to disperse and was beginning to fold their banners, suddenly, police officers emerged from the nearby streets, in tight formation, charging at the Algerians and beating them with batons and capes, particularly targeting the portrait of Messali Hadj. The Algerians, initially surprised, retreated to Place de la Nation where their comrades continued to advance. There was a moment of hesitation, then the Algerians, united with French patriots, regained their composure and defended themselves with admirable courage against the incredible, brutal aggression of the police." Libération points out the responsibility of the police by questioning its readership: "Is their crime that they displayed autonomist emblems, waved the flag of dissidence, and expressed a desire for secession?" Le Populaire, which now only appears on two pages, briefly covers the event and takes an anti-communist approach, typical of the organ of the French Section of the Workers' International (SFIO): "Once again, the Stalinists have used the North Africans of Paris as shock troops."

The weekly magazines also cover the event. Just created in March 1953, L'Express provides only a few lines: "An odious police provocation" or "legitimate response to a communist riot," the brawl in Place de la Nation appears to indicate a hardening of the methods used to maintain public order. Claude Bourdet, director of L'Observateur, accuses Léon Martinaud-Deplat, Minister of the Interior in the Laniel government:

He is the number one agent of the big colonizers, whose instructions are transmitted to him by Senator Borgeaud, king of viticulture in Algeria. He is, along with Maurice Schumann, the main responsible for the abominable policy inaugurated on December 15, 1951, in Tunisia. He supports Marshal Juin, the protector of Glaoui and Boniface. Today, Mr. Martinaud-Deplat is a member of a government that, more than ever, needs the votes of European elected officials from North Africa and the pseudo-elected officials who obey the precedents.

— Claude Bourdet

The right-wing weekly magazine Carrefour has the headline "Oratorical Trifle for the Massacre of July 14th," paraphrasing the anti-Semitic pamphlet Bagatelles pour un massacre by Louis-Ferdinand Céline. The Protestant weekly magazine Réforme laments that the "National Assembly failed to capture the triple political, social, and human aspect of the situation of North Africans in France, which the tragedy darkened, both in Paris and in Algeria." André Sevry, in the weekly magazine Témoignage chrétien, describes the "horror spectacle offered to the demonstrators":

I will not soon forget that evening of July 14th, in Place de la Nation, strewn with debris, pieces of wood, torn banners, leaflets, lost shoes, newspapers stuck to the greasy pavement, and the murmuring of the last breaths of the storm. That black helmet, fallen like a phenomenal mushroom, the surging ebb of cars towards Vincennes, people running, hugging the walls, and above all, those lifeless bodies lying on the polished road, on both sides of the columns of the Throne.

— André Sevry, Témoignage chrétien

== Memory of the massacre ==
The event would subsequently be considered forgotten. In Algeria and France, apart from the families of the victims, no one will become the bearer of this memory, neither on the side of the Algerian authorities who have long censored any mention of Messali Hadj, nor on the side of the French authorities, and even less so on the side of the French communist organizations.

=== In Algeria ===
==== From French authorities' censorship to Algerian government's censorship ====
The first anniversary of the massacre is hardly commemorated. A minute of silence is organized during the MTLD Congress held in Hornu, Belgium, on July 14, 1954. And Liberté, the weekly newspaper of the Algerian Communist Party, publishes an article on July 15. This event in 1953 is subsequently forgotten, completely overshadowed by the Algerian War, which will claim hundreds of thousands of victims.

On the Algerian side, it seemed unthinkable for the new state to commemorate the victims of a demonstration associated with Messali Hadj's party, considered a "traitor to the revolution." The 6 Algerian victims have never been recognized by Algeria as martyrs of the revolution because they died before November 1, 1954, the official start of the Algerian War. While no official recognition has been made at the national level, there have been some local acknowledgments. In 1964, the remains of Abdallah Bacha were transferred by the military to the Martyrs' Cemetery in Bahalil. Similarly, the remains of Abdelkader Draris were transferred in 1964 to the Martyrs' Cemetery in Hennaya, by order of the president Ben Bella and Aït-Ahmed.

==== A rediscovered drama in the 21st century ====
The arrival of Abdelaziz Bouteflika to power in 1999 contributed to lifting the censorship surrounding dissident Messali Hadj, allowing for the mention of the tragedy of 1953. In 2011, Bouteflika named the international airport of Tlemcen after Messali Hadj.

The event is briefly mentioned in Algerie Hebdo on July 18, 2001. In July 2006, Le Soir d'Algérie reports on a commemorative march organized in the village of Tifra (Béjaïa) in memory of Amar Tadjadit. On November 2, La Tribune raises the question, "Who remembers the shootings of July 14, 1953?" On July 15, 2008, Algérie News presents the book by Maurice Rajsfus, published five years earlier. The Igherm-Akdim association organizes a study day on July 5, 2009, in Tiout (Wilaya de Naâma) to celebrate the 56th anniversary of the death of Larbi Daoui. In 2011, the Museum of the Mujahideen in Naâma organizes a conference with poet Ahmed Benchérif. In 2014, the documentary "Les Balles du 14 juillet 1953" by Daniel Kupferstein is presented at the Mohamed Zinet Cinematheque in Algiers.

In 2015, the documentary "Les Balles du 14 juillet 1953" is screened at a festival in Algiers. In 2016, Alger républicain publishes a lengthy article on the demonstration titled "63 years ago, on July 14, 1953, a massacre of Algerians took place in Paris." In 2017, Le Soir d'Algérie once again publishes an article titled "Who remembers the martyrs of July 14, 1953?" where it exclaims, "Commemoration in Paris, ignorance in Algiers!" In 2023, the newspaper El Watan publishes two articles on the demonstration titled "July 14, 1953, in Paris: Bloody repression of a peaceful demonstration of Algerians" and "Six Algerians killed in Paris on July 14, 1953."

=== In France ===
==== Commemorations at Père Lachaise in the press and books ====
Only one newspaper will mention the first anniversary: "La Défense," the journal of Secours populaire, publishes a report by Pierre Éloire in its July–August 1954 issue. He met with three families of the victims in Algeria.

For a few years, the press reports on commemorations organized by the French Communist Party (PCF) at Père-Lachaise Cemetery, where Maurice Lurot is buried.

Later, the event is briefly mentioned by several historians and political figures. Michel Mourre devotes a few lines to the event in his book "25 ans d'histoire universelle, 1945–1970," published in 1971. In his memoirs published in 1972, Jacques Duclos, the PCF candidate in the presidential election three years earlier, mentions it in just one sentence. Three years later, Pierre Goldman, brother of singer Jean-Jacques Goldman, delves into it more extensively in his successful 1975 book, "Souvenirs obscurs d'un juif né en France," as he was "in the vicinity" of the place where the police fired. "Frightened by the gunshots and screams" at the age of nine, he remembers his father, Resistance hero Alter Mojsze Goldman, "gripping his arm tightly" and saying that one should "never be afraid or tremble," a memory he links to a "violent argument" between his father and another PCF activist in the family regarding the death of Stalin and the plot of the white coats, his father switching to Yiddish to speak to his wife during "serious discussions."

Historian and former member of the National Liberation Front (FLN), Mohammed Harbi, also mentions the event in his book "Aux origines du Front de libération nationale: la scission du PPA-MTLD" in the same year, 1975. Former Secretary-General of the Marxist-Leninist Communist Party of France, Jacques Jurquet, discusses the massacre at greater length in "Algérie 1945–1954. Des élections à la lutte armée" (1984).

Historian Benjamin Stora also discusses the massacre in a few articles. In 1985, Anissa Bouayed mentions these events in her thesis on CGT in the Algerian War.

In 1991, Jean-Luc Einaudi mentions the 1954 massacre in his book "La Bataille de Paris," where he also reveals the extent of the death toll during the October 17, 1961, demonstration.

In September 1995, L'Humanité Dimanche publishes a letter from Guy Lurot, the eldest son of one of the victims, Maurice Lurot, who laments the absence of commemoration by the Communists. According to his younger brother Maurice Lurot, this letter did not change anything in the following years regarding the lack of coverage of the event in L'Humanité and Libération. In 2023, both sons speak out again about their father's death in a long article by journalist Assiya Hamza on France 24. Guy Lurot, 87 years old, states that his father "was assassinated," and his brother Maurice says he "never managed to mourn."

==== In-depth research in the 21st century ====
In the early 21st century, several works provide more extensive coverage of the event. In 2000, an article by Danielle Tartakowsky is published in a tribute volume to Charles-André Ageron, and the historian dedicates a chapter to it in her book "Les Manifestations de rue, 1918–1968," published in 2001.

For the 50th anniversary of the event and during the Year of Algeria in France, the first book entirely dedicated to the 1953 demonstration is published. Maurice Rajsfus is approached by Hervé Delouche, an editor at Agnès Viennot. He has three months to write the book. Rajsfus gathers a dozen testimonies, including those of Gérald Bloncourt and Henri Malberg, through a call for witnesses published in L'Humanité. He supplements these testimonies with the reading of newspapers from that period preserved at La Contemporaine, as well as at the National Archives and the Official Journal. The book is not mentioned in the press and sells poorly.

The academic work of Emmanuel Blanchard, published in "La Police parisienne et les Algériens (1944–1962)" in 2011, contributes to furthering the subject. Blanchard mainly relies on the He 3 files from the Archives of the Prefecture of Police (which includes the report of the 247 interviews conducted by the Prefecture of Police with the individuals most involved in the repression at Place de la Nation) and the file (press clippings, reports from the General Intelligence and the National Police) established for the Ministry of the Interior's direction on Algeria and preserved at the National Overseas Archives under the reference FM 81f/90. The magazine L'Histoire devotes two pages to his work in 2012.

In 2012, the History Committee of the City of Paris highlights the event during the exhibition "Paris en guerre d'Algérie" (Paris in the Algerian War). The documentary by Daniel Kupferstein in 2014 reaches a wider audience and is followed by a well-documented book published in 2017. Jacques Simon also publishes a book, "Un 14 juillet, rouge du sang algérien" (A 14th of July, Red with Algerian Blood), entirely dedicated to the tragedy in 2015. In 2021, Rajsfus's book is reissued.

Daniel Kupferstein first hears about this event in 2006. While interviewing Communist activist Francis Poullain about the repression at Charonne metro station during the February 8, 1962, demonstration, Poullain mentions the July 14, 1953, demonstration. Then, during the premiere of his film "Mourir à Charonne, pourquoi?" (Dying in Charonne, Why?) on February 8, 2010, Danielle Tartakowsky suggests to Kupferstein that he should make a trilogy, with a film about 1953 following the documentaries on police violence in 1961 and 1962. Kupferstein declines the proposal, saying, "Thank you, but I have just finished my second film on these subjects, so really, I don't want to become the specialist on Parisian massacres!" But a few months later, he changes his mind, realizing that it was the last opportunity to obtain direct testimonies before the participants of that time become too old. Kupferstein spends four years traveling across France and Algeria to make the documentary, which is released in 2014. Then the director sets to work on turning it into a book, published in 2017. "Les Balles du 14 juillet 1953" (The Bullets of July 14, 1953) is the reference work on the subject, thanks in particular to the study of police archives (Archives of the Prefecture of Police of Paris, series HE8), the investigative file at the Archives of the Seine (Archives de la Seine, No. 1348 W17), and numerous unpublished testimonies from the victims or their relatives, as well as two testimonies from police officers. The director concludes his book hoping that it will help bring this part of French history out of oblivion and that "this massacre will be recognized as a state crime, as was the case with the events of October 17, 1961, and February 8, 1962."

=== Beginning of an official recognition ===
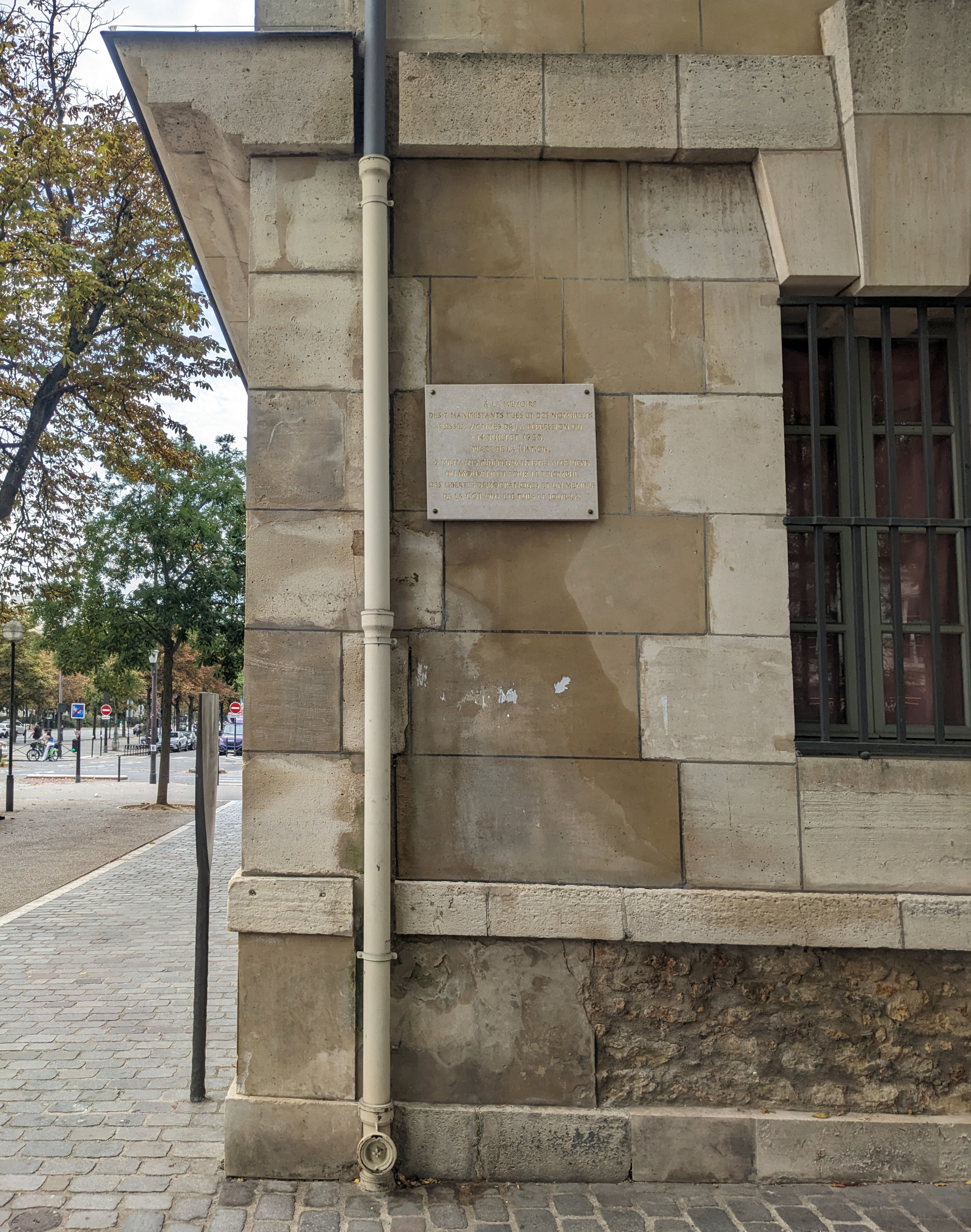
Commemorative plaque in memory of the 7 demonstrators killed on July 14, 1953, installed on the Philippe Auguste Pavilion, Place de l'Île-de-la-Réunion.

The first official recognition is made by the Paris City Hall, on the proposal of Nicolas Bonnet Oulaldj, President of the Communist Group of the Paris City Hall. They adopted a resolution in early 2017 to install a commemorative plaque honoring the events of July 14, 1953, at Place de la Nation. Inaugurated on July 6, 2017, the commemorative plaque is located on Île-de-la-Réunion Square, on the west facade of the Philippe Auguste Pavilion. It mentions:

To the memory of the 7 demonstrators killed and the numerous injured, victims of the repression on July 14, 1953, at Place de la Nation. On that day, 6 Algerian independentist militants from the Movement for the Triumph of Democratic Liberties and a member of the CGT were killed.

— Paris City Hall

The ceremony took place in the presence of a large crowd, including Catherine Vieu-Charier, Deputy Mayor of Paris in charge of Memory and Veterans Affairs, Catherine Barrati-Elbaz, Mayor of the 12th arrondissement, Daniel Kupferstein, Alain Ruscio, local elected officials, survivors, members of the victims' families, MTLD activists, trade unionists, and historians. For the 70th anniversary, the commemorative plaque is replaced by:

On the occasion of the 70th anniversary of the demonstration on July 14, 1953, in memory of the seven demonstrators killed and the numerous injured victims of the violent police repression during the demonstration at Place de la Nation in Paris. On that day, six Algerian independentist militants from the Movement for the Triumph of Democratic Liberties and one communist and CGT trade unionist activist in the metallurgical industry were shot dead.

- Abdallah Bacha, 25 years old
- Larbi Daoui, 27 years old
- Abdelkader Draris, 32 years old
- Mouhoub Iloul, 20 years old
- Tahar Madjène, 26 years old
- Amar Tadjadit, 26 years old
- Maurice Lurot, 41 years old

== See also ==
- Paris massacre of 1961
- Algerian War
