= Fatima Bedar =

Algerian independence activist

Fatima Bedar was an Algerian independence activist, born August 5, 1946, in Tichy and died during the massacre of October 17, 1961 in Paris. Killed at the age of 15, she is considered a Mujahideen martyr.

She was from a French Muslim family from Algeria living in metropolitan France.

== Biography ==
Fatima Bedar was born on August 5, 1946, in Tichy, a city in the Béjaïa Province in Kabylia where she grew up with her mother Dijda. Her father, Husain Bedar, worked in France, in Saint-Denis in the department of Seine-Saint-Denis. He was a Gas holder . During World War II, he fought alongside the 3rd Algerian Tirailleurs Regiment, first at the Battle of France, where he was taken prisoner before escaping and being repatriated to Algeria then to the campaigns of Tunisia, Italy and France with the French Liberation Army.

Fatima Bedar immigrated to France at the age of five, and joined with her mother her father. They lived in a slum in the Pleyel district in Saint-Denis then in a building located rue du Port in Aubervilliers. They bought a house there in 1954, before moving to Sarcelles in 1959.

In April 1961, the family moved into a lodge in Stains. Fatima Bedar had six siblings, the oldest were Zohra, Louisa and Djoudi (born 1956).

Fatima Bedar wished to become a teacher, but she studied at a female commercial education college, located at rue des Boucheries in Saint-Denis; the fault of the "prejudices of the time" as Didier Daeninckx stated.

After the death of her daughter Fatima, Djida Bedar fell ill on several occasions and went for treatment in various nursing homes. She eventually died on 3 April 2003. Fatima's father Hocine Bedar died on 10 March 2008, at the age of ninety.

== Demonstration of October 17, 1961 ==
=== Early political engagement ===
Fatima Bedar grew up in a nationalist family; her father was associated with the federation of France of the FLN. She was eight years old when the Algerian war broke out in 1954. Her father sometimes took her and her younger sister to underground separatists' meetings. It was probably there that she developed her anti-colonialist ideas.

=== Course of the event ===
On October 17, 1961, the French federation of the FLN called for a peaceful demonstration in Paris, in order to protest against a curfew proclaimed a few days earlier by the Prefect of Police Maurice Papon and targeting only Algerians. As Fatima Bedar's parents wished to take part, they asked their eldest daughter to look after her brothers and sisters. However, she too wants to go to the demonstration, which her parents forbid her. They argue, then Fatima Bedar goes to college.

She did not come home in the evening and her parents, after looking for her for long hours in vain, decided to go home late in the evening and to wait for her. Fatima Bedar joined the demonstration alone, with her school bag on her back. The police massacred the protesters. She was beaten up and then thrown into the water, where she drowned. She was then fifteen years old.

=== Disappearance ===
Hocine Bedar reported the disappearance of Fatima Bedar the following day at the Stains and Saint-Denis police station. Djoudi Bedar testifies that "her father was very badly received by the police with insults, jostling and beatings". Her mother, pregnant with their eighth child, for two weeks wandered the streets of Stains and those of the surrounding towns with Djoudi, looking for her daughter, crying and praying, in vain. Together, her parents went to several police stations in the Paris region, seeking to file a national wanted notice. The search continued until October 31, the day the body of Fatima Bedar stuck in the seventh lock of the Canal Saint-Denis with about fifteen others was spotted by a worker then brought up from the Seine. Her father identified her the same day. Her bag was returned to them the next day. Although her father could neither read nor write French, he was forced to sign a statement stating that his daughter committed suicide by drowning.

Fatima Bedar was buried on November 3, 1961, in the communal cemetery of Stains. Thanks to the assistance of the May 8, 45 Foundation and the Ministry of Mujahideen, her remains were exhumed in the fall of 2006 to be transported to Kayblie. She was buried on October 17, 2006, in the square of the martyrs of Tichy, a town where her parents are also buried.

== Memory ==
=== Family blackout ===
For a long time, the parents will keep silent about the death of their eldest daughter.

=== Counter-investigation by Didier Daeninckx and Jean-Luc Einaudi ===
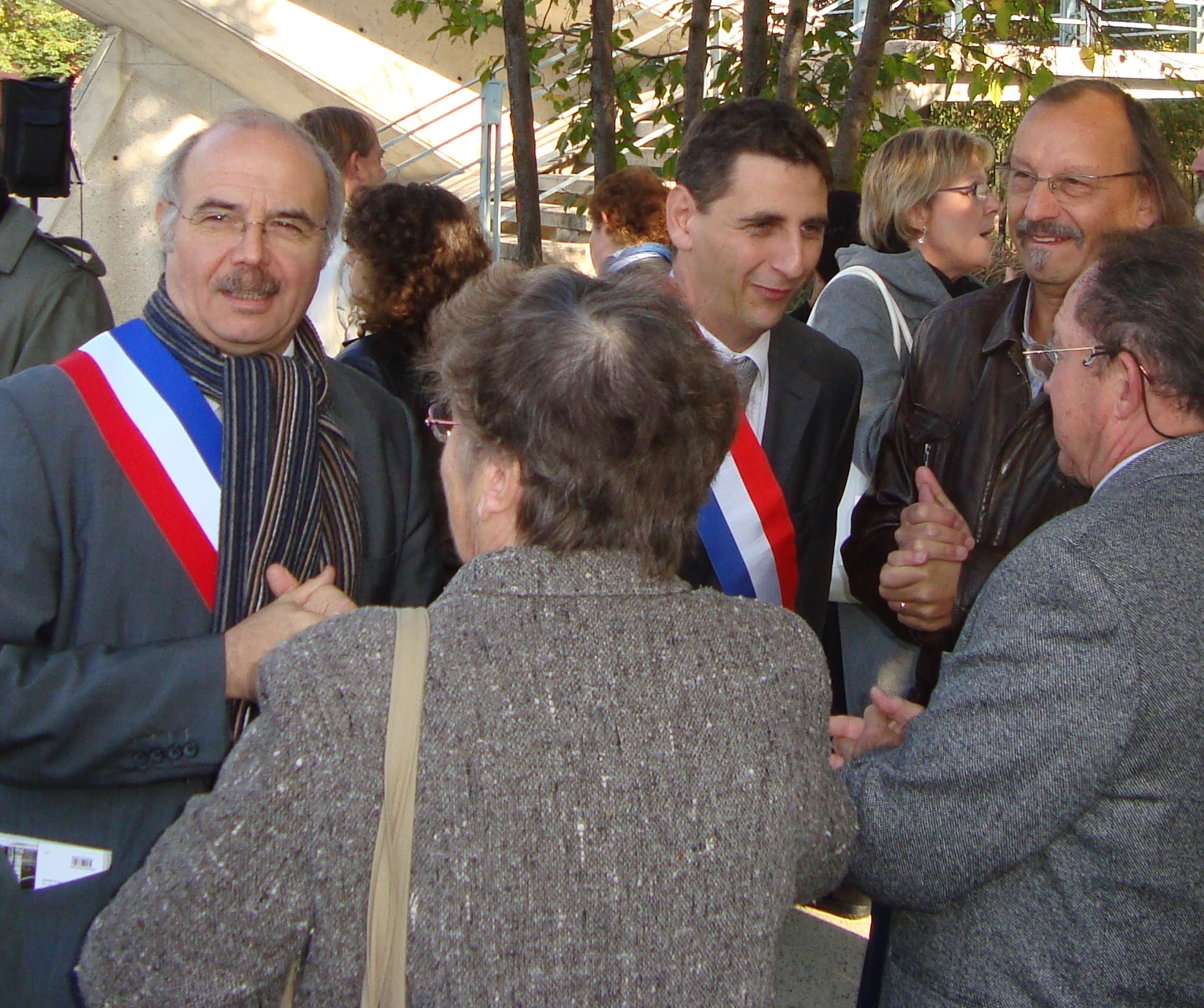
Commemoration of the massacre, October 17, 2008, in Aubervilliers. Didier Daeninckx on the right.

In 1986, fifteen years after the events, Didier Daeninckx, a novelist known for his book Murders for memory, which relates the events of October 17, 1961, and published three years earlier, wrote in the magazine Actualités de l'émigration an article containing the first list deaths; it features Fatima Bedar.

== Appendices ==
=== Bibliography ===
==== General works ====
General works evoking the style of Fatima Bidar.

- Jean-Paul Brunet, Charonne: Lights on a tragedy, Paris, Flammarion, 2003, 336 p. ISBN 2-08-068341-1
- Jean-Luc Einaudi, Scenes from the Algerian War in France: Autumn 1961, Le Cherche midi, 2009, 420 p. ISBN 978-2-7491-1521-4
- Mohamed Ghafir, Cinquantenaire of October 17, 1961, in Paris. Right of evocation and remembrance, Algiers, Encyclopedia editions, 2011, 408 p.

==== About Fatima Bedar ====
- Didier Daeninckx, "Fatima for memory", in Samia Messaoudi and Mustapha Harzoune (ed.), October 7, 1961, 17 writers remember, In the name of memory, 2011, 218 p.
- Malika El Korso, "La colégienne martyre du 17 October 1961", El Watan, 6 October 2006 (read online [archive] [PDF])
- Hana Ferroudj, "Fatima Bedar, Algerian tirailleur's daughter," drowned "on October 17, 1961" [archive], on Bondy Blog, October 16, 2013.

==== Fiction ====
- Didier Daeninckx (script), Mako (drawing) and Laurent Houssin (colors) (pref. Benjamin Stora, postface Didier Daeninckx), Black October, AD Libris, 2011, 42 p. ISBN 978-2-918462-11-8

==== Filmography ====
- Philip Brooks and Alan Hayling, A Missing Day, 1992, 52 minutes.
- Several sisters of Fatima Bedar testify there.
