= Olivier Le Cour Grandmaison =

French political scientist and author

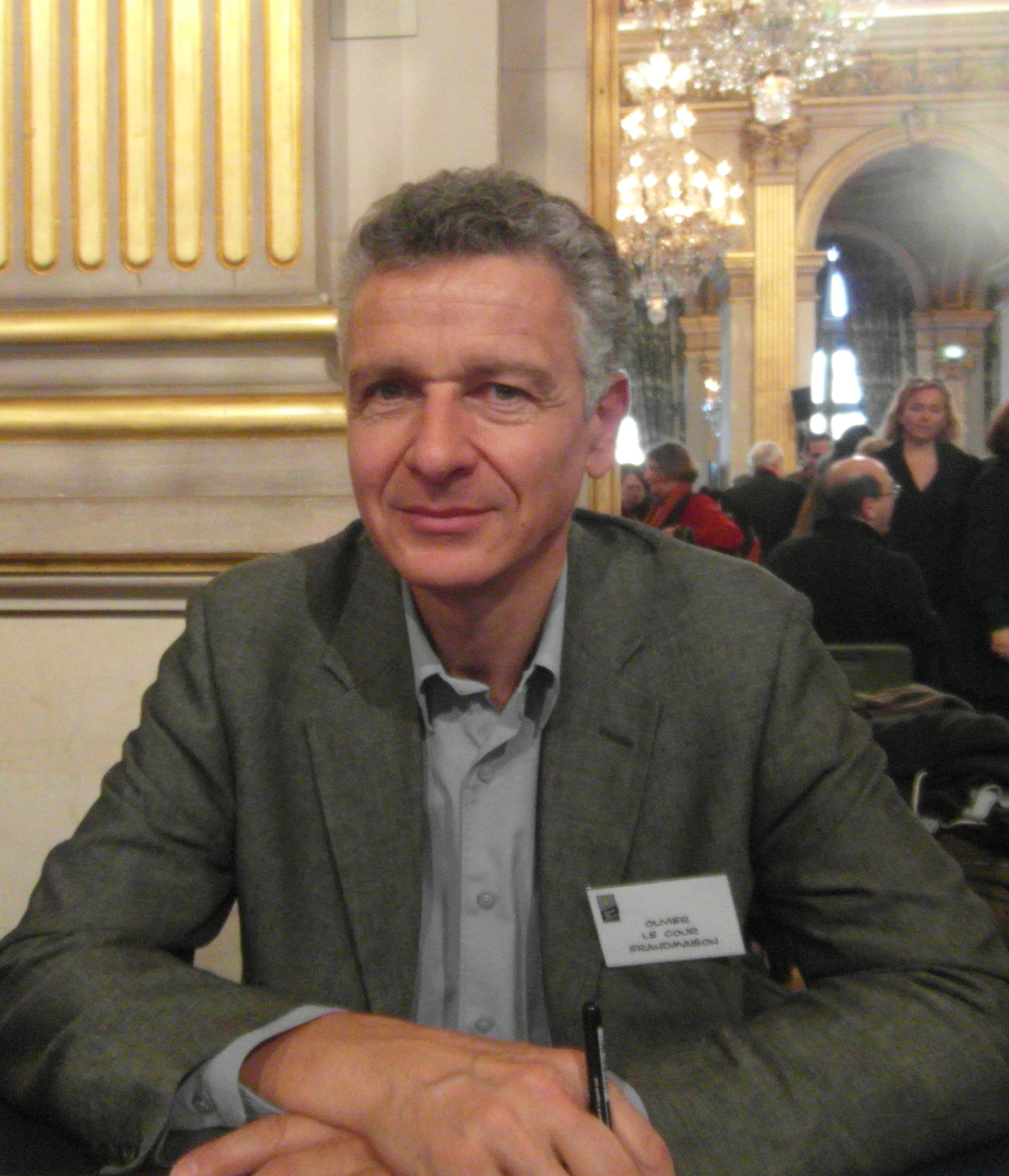
- Olivier Le Cour Grandmaison in 2015.
- Born: 19 September 1960 (age 65)

Olivier Le Cour Grandmaison (born 19 September 1960), is a French political scientist and author whose work chiefly centres on colonialism. He is best known for his book Coloniser, Exterminer - Sur la guerre et l'Etat colonial.

Le Cour Grandmaison is a professor of political science at the Évry-Val d'Essonne University and a teacher at the Collège International de Philosophie. He is the president of the 17 October 1961 Association Against Oblivion, which advocates official recognition for the crimes committed by France during the 1961 Paris massacre.

== Coloniser, Exterminer ==
In his book Coloniser, Exterminer (2005), Le Cour Grandmaison states that techniques and concepts used during the period of late 19th-century New Imperialism were later used during the Holocaust. He points to both Tocqueville and Michelet who spoke of "extermination" during the colonization of the Western United States and the removal of Native American tribes. He quotes Tocqueville's 1841 comment on French conquest of Algeria:

"In France I have often heard people I respect, but do not approve, deplore [the army] burning harvests, emptying granaries and seizing unarmed men, women and children. As I see it, these are unfortunate necessities that any people wishing to make war on the Arabs must accept... I believe the laws of war entitle us to ravage the country and that we must do this, either by destroying crops at harvest time, or all the time by making rapid incursions, known as raids, the aim of which is to carry off men and flocks"

"Whatever the case, continued Tocqueville, we may say in a general manner that all political freedoms must be suspended in Algeria."

According to LeCour Grandmaison, "De Tocqueville thought the conquest of Algeria was important for two reasons: first, his understanding of the international situation and France’s position in the world, and, second, changes in French society." Tocqueville, who despised the July Monarchy (1830–1848), believed that war and colonization would "restore national pride, threatened, he believed, by "the gradual softening of social mores" in the middle classes. Their taste for "material pleasures" was spreading to the whole of society, giving it "an example of weakness and egotism". Applauding the methods of Thomas Robert Bugeaud, Tocqueville went as far as saying that "war in Africa" had become a "science":

"...war in Africa is a science. Everyone is familiar with its rules and everyone can apply those rules with almost complete certainty of success. One of the greatest services that Field Marshal Bugeaud has rendered his country is to have spread, perfected and made everyone aware of this new science".

LeCour Grandmaison states that techniques employed by the French army during the 1954-62 Algerian War were rooted in history. He believes the history of warfare should be not limited to the technical progress of weapons, but should encompass the "judicial, administrative and conceptual arsenal" which accompanies it: "We can only understand the extreme the violence of the 1848 civil war - which much of the time qualifies as "bloody repression" - if we place them in a longer genealogy, by the way exterior, and brought back to what was experimented before, most notably during the Algerian war [the 1830 invasion of Algeria]" In the same interview, LeCour Grandmaison, distinguishes between the criticisms of colonial abuse and those of the principle of colonization itself, basing his arguments on Zola, Victor Hugo, Lamartine, Darwin, André Gide, Albert Londres, Jules Verne, Maupassant, Foucault, Barthes and Joseph Conrad. He states how Marx, Engels and their contemporaries were not immune to 19th-century racial ideology, as they too considered colonization as inevitable and justified, and non-European people as "primitives" and "barbarians". It wasn't until the Third International that the socialist movement opposed colonialism and supported national liberation movements.

== State racism ==
Following the views of Michel Foucault, LeCour Grandmaison spoke of a "state racism" under the French Third Republic, notable by the example of the 1881 Indigenous Code applied in Algeria. Replying to the question "Isn't it excessive to talk about a state racism under the Third Republic?", he replied:

"No, if we can recognize "state racism" as the vote and implementation of discriminatory measures, grounded on a combination of racial, religious and cultural criteria, in those territories. The 1881 Indigenous Code is a monument of this genre! Considered by contemporary prestigious jurists as a "juridical monstruosity", this code planned special offenses and penalties for "Arabs". It was then extended to other territories of the empire. On one hand, a state of rule of law for a minority of French and Europeans located in the colonies. On the other hand, a permanent state of exception for the "indigenous" people. This situation lasted until 1945."

== 23 February 2005 law ==
Olivier LeCour Grandmaison was one of a number of historians who criticized the 23 February 2005 law, instituted by the Union for a Popular Movement (UMP), which required that teachers promote "positive values" of French presence abroad, "in particular in North Africa". The law was not only accused of interfering with the autonomy of Universities within the state, but also of being an obvious case of historical revisionism. The legislation was repealed by president Jacques Chirac in 2006 following criticisms in France from historians and the left-wing, and from abroad, including Algerian president Abdelaziz Bouteflika and Négritude writer Aimé Césaire.

== Bibliography ==
=== Major works ===
- (in French) (with C. Wihtol de Wenden), Les Citoyennetés en Révolution (1789-1794), PUF, 1992 (thesis –- preface of Madeleine Rebérioux)
- (in French) Les étrangers dans la cité. Expériences européennes, Paris, La Découverte, 1993
- (in French) Le 17 octobre 1961 – Un crime d’État à Paris, collectif, Éditions La Dispute, 2001.
- (in French) Haine(s) – Philosophie et Politique, PUF, 2002 (preface by Étienne Balibar) (article on this book)
- (in French) Coloniser, Exterminer - Sur la guerre et l'Etat colonial, Fayard, 2005, ISBN 2-213-62316-3 (Table of contents)
- (in French) La République impériale. Politique et racisme d'Etat, Fayard, 2009.
- (in French) Douce France. Rafles. Rétentions. Expulsions, Seuil/Resf, 2009.
- (in French) De l'indigénat. Anatomie d'un "monstre" juridique:le droit colonial en Algérie et dans l'empire français, Zones/La Découverte, 2010. free access http://www.editions-zones.fr/spip.php?page=lyberplayer&id_article=113

=== Articles ===
- LeCour Grandmaison, Olivier (June 2001). "Torture in Algeria: Past Acts That Haunt France - Liberty, Equality and Colony". Le Monde diplomatique.
- Cohen, William B. 1941. "The Algerian War and the Revision of France's Overseas Mission". Muse Project.
- LeCour Grandmaison, Olivier. "De Tocqueville aux massacres d'Algériens en octobre 1961" (in French).
- "17 Octobre 1961, Olivier La Cour-Grandmaison : le silence n'est plus de mise". L'Humanité (in French). 17 October 2001.
- "Méthodes de guerre (Coloniser, Exterminer)". L'Humanité (in French). 12 February 2005.
- "Le Cour Grandmaison, Haine et politique". L'Humanité (in French). 10 March 2003.
- "Entretien avec Olivier LeCour Grandmaison" (in French). El Watan. 19 March 2005.

== See also ==
- Colonialism
- French rule in Algeria
- Paris massacre of 1961
- Sven Lindqvist, a Swedish author who also demonstrated links between colonialism and the Holocaust
