= 1961 Paris massacre =

French police killing of Algerian demonstrators

- Part of the Algerian War
- Graffiti on the Pont Saint-Michel in 1961: "Ici on noie les Algériens" ("Here we drown Algerians"). Dozens of bodies were later pulled from the river Seine.
- Location: Pont Saint-Michel
- Date: 17 October 1961; 65 years ago
- Deaths: 40 (government claim) up to 50 (Brunet claim); 200–300 (other historians' claims)
- Victim: A demonstration of some 30,000 pro-National Liberation Front (FLN) Algerians
- Perpetrators: Head of the Parisian police, Maurice Papon, the French National Police
- Motive: French nationalism, anti-Arab sentiment

The 1961 Paris massacre (Note: French: Massacre de Paris en 1961) (also called the 17 October 1961 massacre (Note: French: Massacre du 17 octobre 1961) in France) was the mass killing of Algerians who were living in Paris by the French National Police. It occurred on 17 October 1961, during the Algerian War (1954–62). Under orders from the head of the Parisian police, Maurice Papon, the National Police attacked a demonstration by 30,000 pro-National Liberation Front (FLN) Algerians. After 37 years of denial and censorship of the press, in 1998 the government finally acknowledged 40 deaths, while some historians estimate that between 200 and 300 Algerians died. Death was due to heavy-handed beating by the police, as well as mass drownings, as police officers threw demonstrators into the river Seine.

The massacre was intentional, as substantiated by historian Jean-Luc Einaudi, who won a trial against Papon in 1999 (Papon had been convicted in 1998 of crimes against humanity for his role under the Vichy collaborationist regime during World War II). Official documentation and eyewitness accounts within the Paris police department suggest that Papon directed the massacre himself. Police records show that he called for officers in one station to be "subversive" in quelling the demonstrations, and assured them protection from prosecution if they participated.

Forty years after the massacre, on 17 October 2001, Bertrand Delanoë, the Mayor of Paris, put up a plaque in remembrance of the massacre on Pont Saint-Michel. How many demonstrators were killed is still unclear. In the absence of official estimates, the plaque commemorating the massacre reads, "In memory of the many Algerians killed during the bloody repression of the peaceful demonstration of 17 October 1961". On 18 February 2007 (the day after Papon's death) calls were made for a Paris Métro station under construction in Gennevilliers to be named "17 Octobre 1961" in commemoration of the massacre.

== Background ==
The massacre took place in the context of the Algerian War (1954–62), which had become increasingly violent. After Charles de Gaulle's return to power during the May 1958 crisis and his sudden change of policy on Algerian independence, the OAS (the Organisation armée secrète, Secret Army Organisation, a far-right French dissident paramilitary and terrorist organisation) used all possible means to oppose the National Liberation Front (FLN), which took the war to the metropolis, where it was helped by activists such as the Jeanson network. The repression by French authorities, both in Algeria and in metropolitan France, was very harsh.

=== The French National Police ===
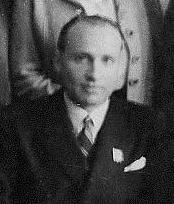
Maurice Papon, who died in 2007, was the only Vichy France official to be convicted for his role in the deportation of Jews during World War Two

According to historian Jean-Luc Einaudi, a specialist on the massacre, some of the causes of the violent repression of the 17 October 1961 demonstration can best be understood in terms of the composition of the French police force itself, which still included many former members of the force in place during the Vichy regime that collaborated with the Gestapo to detain Jews, as for example in the Vel' d'Hiv Roundup of 16–17 July 1942.

The vast majority of police officers suspended after the Liberation of Paris in 1944 for extreme forms of collaborationism (including assistance to the Parti Populaire Français and similar groups) were later reintegrated into the police forces. In contrast, some of the policemen who had been part of the French Resistance had their career advancement blocked because of Cold War anti-communism, since the Resistance was partially communist and communist ministers had been expelled from the government in May 1947. Moreover, police officers who had been members of the Resistance might well have taken part in the various raids against Jews and other persecuted groups during the Vichy regime, as otherwise they would have been dismissed.

Papon's career as Head of Paris's police force in the 1960s and Minister of Finance under Valéry Giscard d'Estaing's presidency in the 1970s suggests that there was institutional racism in the French police until at least the 1960s. In fact, Papon was not charged and convicted until 1997–98 for his World War II crimes against humanity in being responsible for the deportation of 1,560 Jews, including children and the elderly, between 1942 and 1944.

=== Papon appointed head of Police Prefecture (March 1958) ===
Before his appointment as chief of the Paris police, Papon had been, since 1956, prefect of the Constantine department in Algeria, where he actively participated in the repression of and use of torture against the civilian population. On 13 March 1958, 7,000 policemen demonstrated in the courtyard of the police headquarters against delays in the "risque prime" accorded to them because of the war, although the FLN had not yet begun to target police officers. Encouraged by far-right deputy Jean-Marie Le Pen, 2,000 of them attempted to enter the Palais Bourbon, seat of the National Assembly, with shouts of "Sales Juifs! A la Seine! Mort aux fellaghas!" (Dirty Jews! Into the Seine (river)! Death to the (Algerian) rebels!). With Minister of Interior Maurice Bourgès-Maunoury's recommendation, Papon was named prefect the next day. Two years earlier, in Constantine, Algeria, he had assumed the role of "Inspecteur général pour l'administration en mission extraordinaire" (IGAME – General Inspector for the Administration on Extraordinary Mission). "Prohibited zones, detention centers (camps de regroupements), torture, executions without trial: this is the reality of the war he [Papon] was supervising out there." According to Einaudi, in the following years he applied these methods in Paris and the Seine department.

After the May 1958 crisis and the installation of the French Fifth Republic under 'Free France' leader Charles de Gaulle's leadership, Papon was kept on. He created the compagnies de district (district companies), police forces that specialized in repression, where new police recruits were trained. These companies were formed mainly from veterans of the First Indochina War (1947–54) and young Frenchmen coming back from Algeria.

=== August 1958 raids ===
On 25 August 1958, the FLN launched an offensive in Paris. During this action, three policemen were killed on Boulevard de l'Hôpital in the 13th Arrondissement. Another policeman was killed in front of the cartoucherie de Vincennes. A police station came under machine gun fire. Papon retaliated with massive raids on Algerian people in Paris and its suburbs. More than 5,000 Algerians were detained in the former Beaujon hospital, in the Japy gymnasium (11th Arrondissement) and in the Vél'd'Hiv. The Japy gymnasium and the Vél'd'Hiv had been used as detention centers under the Vichy regime. A former member of the FTP resistance, reporter Madeleine Rifaud wrote in L'Humanité:

In the past two days, a racist concentration camp has been opened in Paris. They have not even had the good sense to choose a site which would not remind French patriots who are currently celebrating the anniversary of the Liberation of Paris of what took place there.

=== Creation of the CIV and the FPA militia (1959–1960) ===
According to Einaudi, "Already at this time, policemen [were] boasting about throwing Algerians in the Seine" river. Vincennes's "identification center" (CIV—Centre d'identification de Vincennes) was then created under the authority of the prefecture of police in January 1959. Algerians detained during police raids in the Paris region could be brought there for identity verifications but could also be put under house arrest by the prefect. "These raids were frequently the occasion of violence," Einaudi wrote.

The Auxiliary Police Force (FPA—Force de police auxiliaire) was created in 1959. This special constabulary force, under the authority of the Algerian Affairs Coordination Center of the Prefecture of Police (Centre de coordination des Affaires algériennes de la préfecture de police) and supervised by the military, was under Papon's control. Led by Captain Raymond Montaner and based at the Fort de Noisy, Romainville, it was composed entirely of Algerian Muslims recruited in Algeria or France. In autumn 1960, the FPA had 600 members. It first operated in the 13th Arrondissement, where it requisitioned café-hotels. Torture is rumoured to have been used, most notably at 9, rue Harvey and 208, rue du Château des Rentiers. Forced disappearances took place. The FPA then extended its action to the 18th Arrondissement, where three hotels were requisitioned in rue de la Goutte-d'Or. The FPA was also active in the suburbs, from the summer of 1961, in particular in Nanterre's bidonvilles. Some voices were opposed to these crimes denied by the police prefecture. Christian magazine Témoignage chrétien wrote: "It is not possible to stay silent when, in our Paris, men are resurrecting the methods of the Gestapo".

=== 1961 ===
The FLN decided to resume bombings against the French police at the end of August 1961; from the end of August to the beginning of October 1961, 11 policemen were killed and 17 injured in Paris and its suburbs. "These bombings had the effect of spreading fear throughout the ranks of the Paris police, but also for increasing the desire for revenge and hate against the whole of the community. During the whole of September, the Algerian population was severely repressed. In practice, this massive repression was based on physical appearance", according to Einaudi. There were daily raids against Algerians—and frequently any Maghrebi people (Moroccans or Tunisians), and even Spanish or Italian immigrants, who were mistaken for Algerians. Algerians were arrested at work or in the streets and thrown into the Seine with their hands tied in order to drown them, among other methods, as shown for example in a report by the priest Joseph Kerlan from the Mission de France.

According to Einaudi, "It was in this climate that, on 2 October, during the funerals of a policeman killed by the FLN, the police prefect [Papon] proclaimed, in the prefecture's courtyard: 'For one hit taken we shall give back ten!' This call was an encouragement to kill Algerians and was immediately understood as such. On the same day, visiting Montrouge's police station, the prefect of police declared to the police officers present: 'You also must be subversive in the war that sets you against others. You will be covered, I give you my word on that'".

== Events ==
On 5 October 1961, the Prefecture of Police announced in a press statement the introduction of a curfew from 8.30 p.m. to 5.30 a.m. in Paris and its suburbs for "Algerian Muslim workers", "French Muslims" and "French Muslims of Algeria" (all three terms used by Papon, although the approximately 150,000 Algerians living at the time in Paris were officially considered French and possessed a French identity card). The French Federation of the FLN thus called upon the whole of the Algerian population in Paris, men, women and children, to demonstrate against the curfew, widely regarded as a racist administrative measure, on 17 October 1961. According to historian Jean-Luc Einaudi, Papon had 7,000 policemen, 1,400 CRS and gendarmes mobiles (riot police) to block this demonstration, to which the Prefecture of Police had not given its agreement (mandatory for legal demonstrations). The police forces thus blocked all access to the capital, metro stations, train stations, Paris' Portes, etc. Of a population of about 150,000 Algerians living in Paris, 30,000–40,000 of them managed to join the demonstration however. Police raids were carried out all over the city. 11,000 persons were arrested, and transported by RATP bus to the Parc des Expositions and other internment centers used under Vichy. Those detained included not only Algerians, but also Moroccan and Tunisian immigrants, who were then sent to the various police stations, to the courtyard of the police prefecture, the Palais des Sports of Porte de Versailles (15th Arrondissement), and the Stade Pierre de Coubertin, etc.

Despite these raids, 4,000 to 5,000 people succeeded in demonstrating peacefully on the Grands Boulevards from République to Opéra, without incident. Blocked at Opéra by police forces, the demonstrators backtracked. Reaching the Rex cinema (the site of the present Le Rex Club on the "Grands Boulevards"), the police opened fire on the crowd and charged, leading to several deaths. On the Neuilly bridge (separating Paris from the suburbs), the police detachments and FPA members also shot at the crowd, killing some. Algerians were thrown into and drowned in the Seine at points across the city and its suburbs, most notably at the Pont Saint-Michel in the centre of Paris and near the Prefecture of Police, very close to Notre Dame de Paris.

During the night, a massacre took place in the courtyard of the police headquarters, killing tens of victims. In the Palais des Sports, then in the "Parc des Expositions of Porte de Versailles", detained Algerians, many by now already injured, [became] systematic victims of a 'welcoming committee'. In these places, considerable violence took place and prisoners were tortured. Men would be dying there until the end of the week. Similar scenes took place in the Coubertin stadium... The raids, violence and drownings would continue over the following days. For several weeks, unidentified corpses were discovered along the river banks. The victims of the massacre can be estimated to at least 200 fatalities.

In 1961, the police prefecture spoke only of "2 persons shot dead". Following historian Jean-Luc Einaudi's testimony during the Papon trial in the late-1990s, left-wing police Minister Jean-Pierre Chevènement ordered the opening of parts of the archives. The resulting Mandelken Report, based on the investigation of these partial records, counted 32 dead. Einaudi then published an op-ed in Le Monde on 20 May 1998, contesting this official figure, criticizing both the methodology of the report and the consulted records. He called attention to the fact that many of the records had been destroyed. A report that Papon had prepared for Interior Minister Roger Frey, the prime minister, and the head of government, Charles de Gaulle, was not included in the consulted records. In addition, the Mandelken report ignored the massacre that had taken place in the courtyard of the Police prefecture, and Papon's name itself appeared nowhere in the report. Einaudi concluded his op-ed stating that: "on the night of 17 October 1961 there had been a massacre perpetrated by the police forces acting on the orders of Maurice Papon." Papon subsequently filed a lawsuit against him in February 1999, because of this sentence, alleging defamation of a public servant.

In the meanwhile, the state acknowledged in 1998 the massacre and spoke of 40 dead.

Responding to Papon's request, the court gave an ambiguous judgement. It stated that Einaudi had "defamed" Papon, but that Einaudi had acted on "good faith", and praised the "seriousness and quality" of Einaudi's research. Both Papon and Einaudi were thus vindicated by the court's judgement.

The French government commission in 1998 claimed only 48 people died. Historian Jean-Luc Einaudi (La Bataille de Paris, 1991) asserted that as many as 200 Algerians had been killed. The historian Jean-Paul Brunet found satisfactory evidence for the murder of 31 Algerians, while suggesting that a number of up to 50 actual victims was credible.

This contradicts David Assouline, who in 1997 was granted limited access to consult part of the police documents (which were supposed to be classified until 2012) by Minister of Culture Catherine Trautmann (PS). He found a list of 70 persons killed, while the texts confirmed Einaudi's comments that the magistrates who had been called on by the victims' families to consider these incidents had systematically acquitted the policemen. According to Le Monde in 1997, which quoted the director of the Paris Archives, the register listed 90 persons by the second half of October.

In a 2001 article in Esprit, Paul Thibaud discussed the controversy between Jean-Luc Einaudi, who spoke of 200 killed on 17 October, and 325 killed by the police during the autumn of 1961, and Jean-Paul Brunet, who gave an estimate of only 50 (and 160 dead, possible homicide victims, who passed through the IML medico-legal institute during the four months between September and December 1961). Although criticizing Einaudi on some points, Thibaud also underlined that Brunet had consulted only police archives and took the registers of the IML medico-legal institute at face value. Based on other sources, Thibaud pointed out (as did Brunet) that administrative dissimulation about the dead had taken place, and that the IML could not be relied upon as sole source. Thibaud concluded that Einaudi's work made it possible to give an estimate of 300 Algerian victims of murder (whether by police or others) between 1 September and 31 December 1961.

The events surrounding the massacre and its death toll were largely unknown for decades. There was almost no media coverage at the time. These events remained unknown in part because they were overshadowed in the French media by the Charonne Metro Station massacre on 8 February 1962 whose victims were not only Algerians, but also French members of the French Communist Party.

== Reactions ==
On 26 October 1961, Georges Montaron, editor of Témoignage chrétien, Claude Bourdet, editor of France Observateur, Emmanuel d'Astier de la Vigerie, editor of Libération, Avril, editor of Télérama, parish priest Lochard, Jean-Marie Domenach, editor of Esprit magazine, Jean Schaeffert and André Souquière organized in the Maison de la Mutualité a meeting to "protest against police violence and the repression of the 17 October 1961 demonstration in Paris".

A few days later, some anonymous policemen published a text called A group of republican policemen declare... (Un groupe de policiers républicains déclarent...) on 31 October, stating:

What happened on 17 October 1961 and in the following days against the peaceful demonstrators, on whom no weapons were found, morally forces us to bring our testimony and to alert public opinion (...)
All culprits must be punished. The punishment must be extended to all responsible people, those who give orders, those who pretend to just let it happen, whatever their high office may be (...)
Among the thousands of Algerians brought to the Parc des Expositions of the Porte de Versailles, tens were killed by blows from rifle butts and pickaxe handles (...) Others had their fingers chopped off by members of law enforcement, policemen and gendarmes, who cynically had renamed themselves "welcoming committee". On one end of the Neuilly bridge, groups of policemen on one side, CRS on the other, moved slowly towards each other. All the Algerians captured in this huge trap were knocked out and systematically thrown in the Seine. A good hundred people were subjected to this treatment (...) [In the Parisian police headquarters,] torturers threw their victims by tens in the Seine, which flows only a few meters from the courtyard, to keep them from being examined by forensic experts. Not without taking their watches and money. Mr Papon, the police prefect, and Mr. Legay, general director of the city police, were present during those dreadful scenes (...)
These indisputable facts are only a small part of what happened these last days and what continues to happen. They are known among the city police. The crimes committed by the harkis, by the Brigades spéciales des districts, by the Brigades des aggressions et violences are no secret any more. The little information given by news outlets is nothing compared to the truth (...)
We won't sign this text and sincerely regret it. We observe, not without sadness, that current circumstances do not allow us to do so (...)

The authors remained anonymous until the late 1990s although Maurice Papon tried to discover them. In February 1999, its main author, Emile Portzer, former member of the National Front resistance organization during the war, testified in favor of historian Jean-Luc Einaudi during the trial that Papon had launched against him (later won by Einaudi). On 1 January 1962, Papon declared to the police forces under his orders:

On 17 October you won ... victory against Algerian terrorism ... Your moral interests have been successfully defended, since the aim of the police prefecture's opponents to put in place an investigation committee have been defeated.

== 8 February 1962 Charonne massacre ==
On 8 February 1962, another demonstration against the OAS, which had been prohibited by the State, was repressed at Charonne Métro station (Charonne subway massacre). Nine members of the CGT trade union, most of them French Communist Party members, were killed by police forces, directed by Papon under the same government, with Roger Frey as Minister of the Interior, Michel Debré as Prime Minister and Charles de Gaulle as President, who did all they could to "hide the scale of the 17 October crime" (Jean-Luc Einaudi). The funerals on 13 February 1962 of the nine persons killed (among them, Fanny Dewerpe, mother of French historian Alain Dewerpe) were attended by hundreds of thousands of people. On 8 February 2007 the Place du 8 Février 1962, a square near the metro station, was dedicated by Bertrand Delanoë, the mayor of Paris, after sprays of flowers were deposited at the foot of a commemorative plaque installed inside the metro station where the killings occurred.

== Reporting ==
According to James J. Napoli, coverage of the massacre by major British and American media sources, such as The Times, Time magazine and The New York Times, downplayed the severity of the massacre as well as the Paris government's responsibility for the events.

== Historiography and recent events ==
=== Access to archives and number of deaths ===
Following the massacre that occurred in 1961, the police archives were sealed to anyone looking to investigate until the 1990s when they were eventually reopened. This was following the publication of "La Bataille de Paris" by Jean-Luc Einaudi in which he approximated that the death toll was closer to 200. With the publication of this book, the massacre began to gain more acknowledgement which led to the reopening of the archives. However, Einaudi still was denied access for 30 months following the access that was granted to another historian Jean-Paul Brunet who estimated that the death toll was about 30.

The official death toll was initially three, before the French government acknowledged in 1998 that the massacre occurred and that "several dozen" people were killed.

=== Prosecutions ===
No one has been prosecuted for participation in the killings, because they fell under the general amnesty for crimes committed during the Algerian War.

=== Commemoration and official recognition ===
Forty years after the massacre, on 17 October 2001, the event was officially acknowledged by the city of Paris with the placement and unveiling of a memorial plaque to the victims of 1961 near the Pont Saint-Michel, in the immediate vicinity of the police prefecture (préfecture de police).

The establishment of an official memorial and thus also the commemorative plaque proposed by the political left and supported by the Socialist mayor of Paris, Bertrand Delanoë, were however by no means uncontroversial. This was also evident in the debates on a draft resolution for the commemorative plaque on 24 September 2001 in the Paris City Council (Conseil de Paris). The right-wing representatives opposed the proposed plaque, viewing it as a way of blaming the political authorities in 1961 and not to recognise the reciprocal violence between the FLN and the police. Furthermore, concerns were raised regarding the potentially increasing threat of civil unrest and terrorism. Although it was the extreme right that first fiercely opposed the decision, many centrist and left-wing politicians, including former Interior Minister Jean-Pierre Chevènement, also did so, the latter because it could harm national cohesion. The opposition groups that ultimately rejected the draft resolution were the DL, RPR, Tibéristes and UDF. The tribute to the victims of 17 October 1961, was furthermore criticised by police unions (Alliance, SGP-FO) who saw the action as an affront to the force and feared that bringing up the events could lead to an alienation between the national police (Police nationale) and the French people.

The unveiling ceremony of the plaque took place without the presence of an official representative of the Socialist government and the Élysée Palace, as well as in the absence of any local right-wing politician. Furthermore, a short distance from the Pont Saint-Michel another demonstration was organised to protest against the tribute, with political representatives, right-wing and far-right activists seeing the tribute as a "provocation".

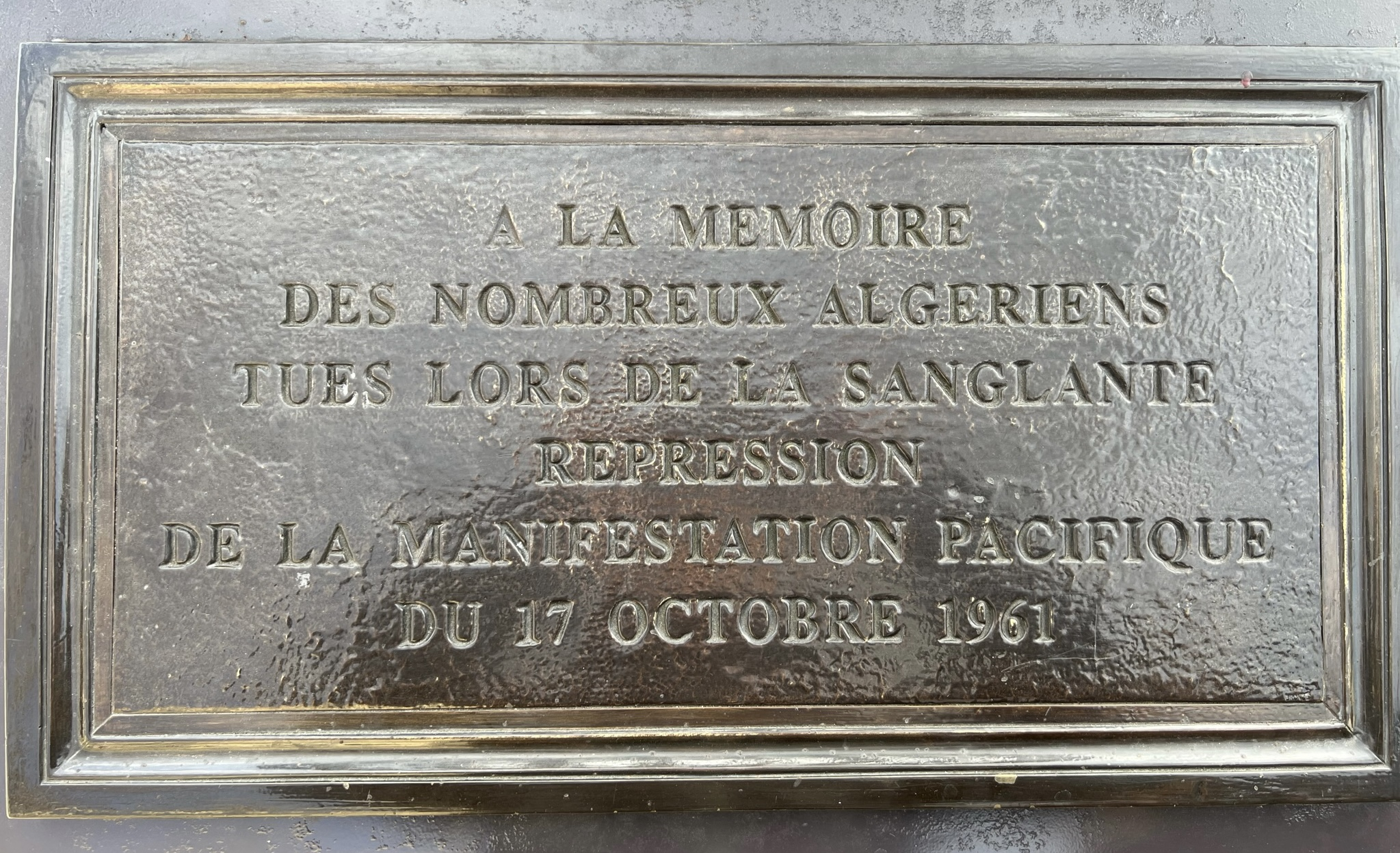
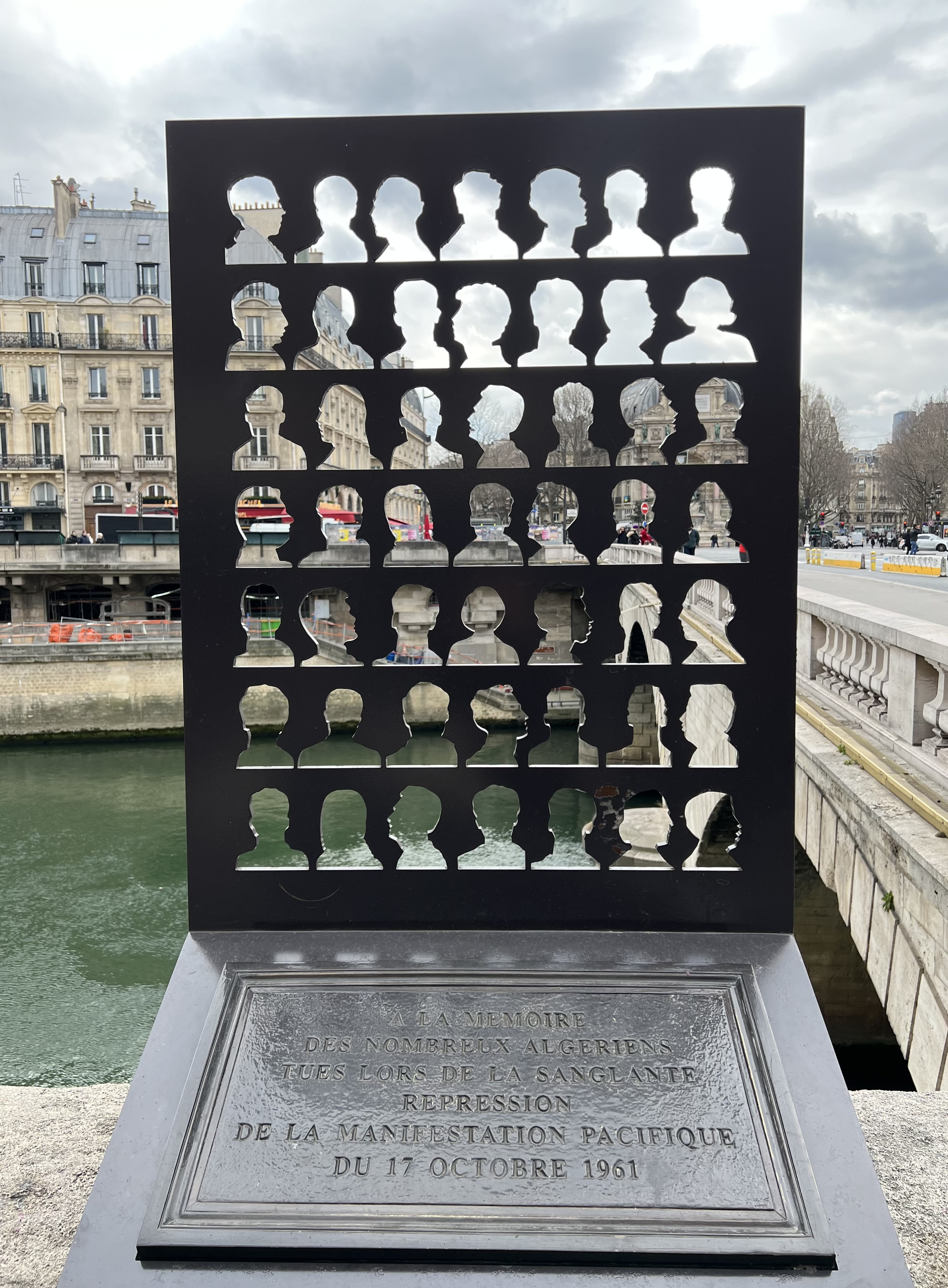
On 17 October 2019, the Mayor of Paris, Anne Hidalgo, in the presence of the Secretary General of the Algerian Ministry of Foreign Affairs, Rachid Bladehane, elevated the plaque from 2001 and unveiled a steel artwork depicting the hollowed silhouettes of demonstrators cut out on the waters of the Seine.

The inscription on the plaque reads "à la mémoire des nombreux Algériens tués lors de la sanglante répression de la manifestation pacifique du 17 octobre 1961" (Engl.: "in memory of the many Algerians killed during the bloody repression of the peaceful demonstration on 17 October 1961") and therefore remains very vague, addressing neither the agency of the perpetrators nor any kind of responsibility. The chosen text was also criticised by historian Olivier LeCour Grandmaison, president of the 17 October 1961 Association, declared to L'Humanité that

"if a step forward had been taken with the decision of the city of Paris to put a commemorative plaque on the Pont Saint-Michel, [he] deplored that the text which was chosen for it invokes neither the idea of a crime against humanity nor the responsibility of the author of the crime, the state. Thus, in no case does this Parisian initiative exempt the highest national authorities from taking responsibility. In addition, if [former Socialist Prime minister] Lionel Jospin personally expressed himself last year [in 2000] by speaking of "tragic events", neither the police's responsibility in the crime nor that of those politically responsible at the time have been clearly established, much less officially condemned."

After the ceremony, Bertrand Delanoë, stated that it was important to come to terms with what had happened and to move forward in unity. The mayor went on and said that the plaque was not directed against anyone but was rather intended to reassure the descendants of the victims that they were part of the Parisian community.

The local political controversies are also reflected in the fact that the commemorative plaque was eventually placed on the Île de la Cité (4th arrondissement) rather than on the left bank of the Seine, since the 5th arrondissement had a Gaullist mayor at the time.

Later that day, Jacques Floch, the Secretary of State for Defence with responsibility for veterans, justified Delanoë's gesture in front of the National Assembly and stated that the curfew in 1961 applied based on race, whereupon many RPR and Démocratie libérale deputies left the assembly, expressing their disapproval of the political recovery of the tragic event.

The events in 2001 clearly took place at the local level. No government official attended the unveiling of the plaque and Bertrand Delanoë, as an elected official of the city of Paris, clearly referred to the Parisian community. The fact that the recognition was carried out at the local level was later increasingly scrutinized, and some suggest that the Paris initiative was intended to diminish the requests for national recognition. But even without an any official government involvement, the installation of the plaque had an impact beyond Paris.

“The image of the plaque resonates also in other cities around Paris as a corrective act of the great national narrative. Plaques and the renaming of streets, squares and public loci as ‘17 October 1961’ are memory initiatives that ensure the transition from state lie to the historical transformation of one of the traumatic situations embedded along the fractured lines between the colonial and the post-colonial. Plaques are akin to sites of memory, part of the process of healing traumas by keeping them alive in the present and represent the engagement of the post-colonial period towards correcting the distortions of silenced history.”

On 17 October 2012, President François Hollande acknowledged the 1961 massacre of Algerians in Paris. His acknowledgement of the event was the first time a French president had acknowledged the massacre. This acknowledgement came two months before his address to Algerian Parliament. In his address to the Algerian Parliament, he further renounced and acknowledged the colonial past of France including the massacre that took place on the 17 October 1961. This address has been found to be very controversial due to how President Hollande framed French colonization and other content that was in the address. Some argue that despite President Hollande's acknowledgement of the event, it will hold little value in changing the view of France and their imperialistic history.

On 16 October 2021, President Emmanuel Macron condemned the massacre on the eve of its 60th anniversary, recognising officially that the French Republic had committed at this occasion "unforgivable crimes", without however issuing a formal apology for such "unforgivable crimes", in line with its stated policy consisting in recognising and acknowledging colonial crimes committed by the French Republic in the past, rather than formally apologising for them or asking for forgiveness. Macron later attended a memorial ceremony for the victims becoming the first French president to do so.

In June 2022, the newspaper Mediapart presented declassified archive documents from the de Gaulle presidency attesting that de Gaulle was quickly aware of the extent of the massacre and the criminal acts of the French police on 17 October and the following weeks. Certain documents presented de Gaulle's desire to punish the guilty and to refuse the establishment of impunity within the French police. According to historian Gilles Manceron, de Gaulle's desire for sanctions was prevented by his fears of fracturing his political majority.

On 28 March 2024, the French National Assembly approved a resolution presented by Greens MP Sabrina Sebaihi and Renaissance MP Julie Delpech condemning the massacre as a "bloody and murderous repression" that was made "under the authority of police prefect Maurice Papon". The measure, which passed with 67 affirmative votes and 11 others voting against, also called for the official commemoration of the massacre.

On the occasion of the opening ceremony for the 2024 Summer Olympics taking place in Paris, the members of the Algerian delegation tossed red roses into the Seine to honour the victims of the massacre.

== In popular culture ==
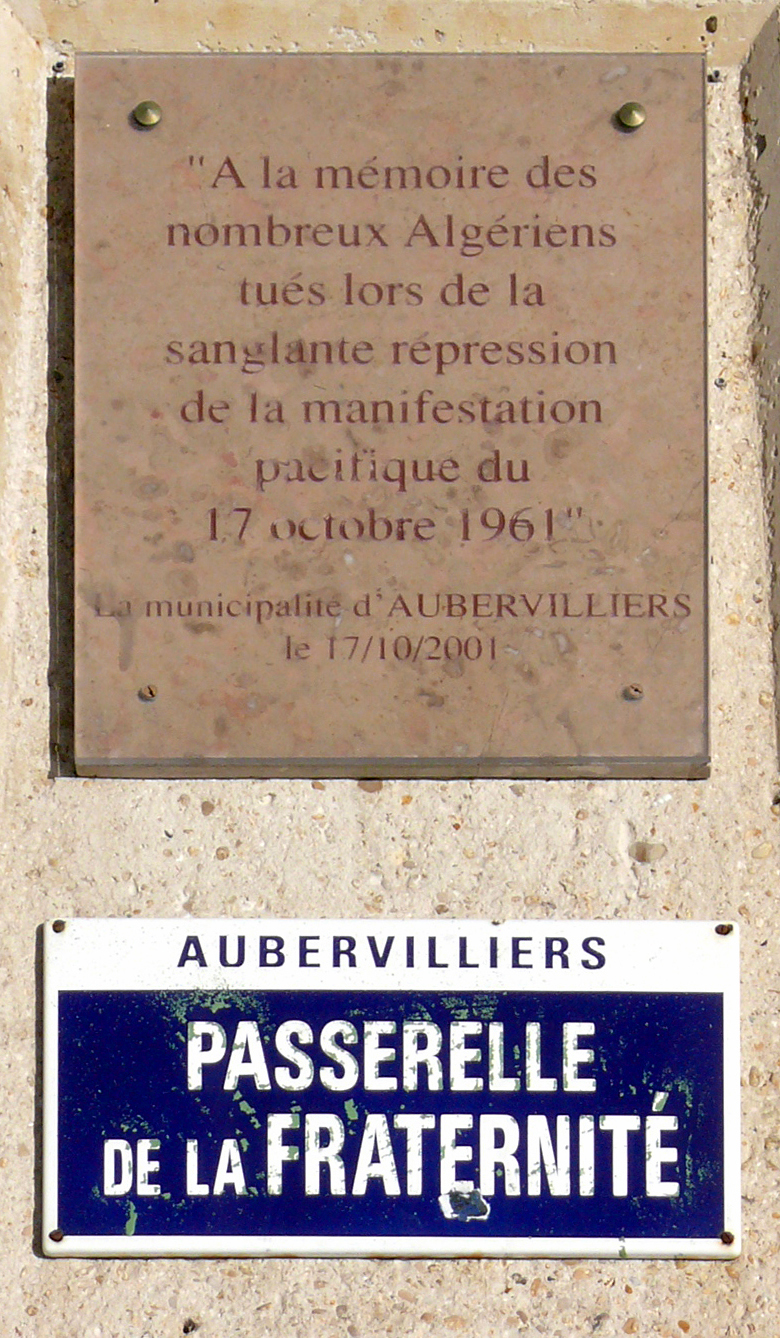
A memorial plaque for Algerians killed on 17 October 1961 by Parisian police officers who were acting under orders of the Prefect of Police, Maurice Papon.

- The massacre was referenced in "Bruno, Chief of Police," a 2008 novel by Martin Walker.
- The massacre was referenced in Caché, a 2005 film by Michael Haneke.
- The 2005 French television drama-documentary Nuit noire, 17 octobre 1961 explores in detail the events of the massacre. It follows the lives of several people and also shows some of the divisions within the Paris police, with some openly arguing for more violence while others tried to uphold the rule of law.
- Drowning by Bullets, a television documentary in the British Secret History series, first shown on 13 July 1992.
- The massacre is the subject of Leïla Sebbar's 1999 novel The Seine was Red: Paris, October 1961 (La Seine était rouge (Paris, octobre 1961)).
- The massacre is described in the opening verse of Irish punk rock band Stiff Little Fingers song 'When The Stars Fall From The Sky'.
- French rapper Médine dedicates a song to the massacre on his album Table d'écoute.
- It forms the core of Didier Daeninckx' 1984 thriller Meurtres pour mémoire, which is also the first attempt to mine the archives of the massacre through the form of a fictional enquiry. However, expatriate American novelist and journalist William Gardner Smith's 1963 novel The Stone Face is now recognized as the earliest known fictional treatment of the events. Although the death toll is listed in many places at 140 dead or missing, writer and social critic Kristin Ross points out otherwise while invoking Smith's and Daeninckx's work:

African-American novelist William Gardner Smith put the figure at "over two hundred" in his 1963 novel, The Stone Face. It is a mark of the success surrounding the official blackout of information about 17 October that Smith's novel, written by a foreigner in France and published in the United States (it could not be published in France), would stand as one of the few representations of the event available all the way up until the early 1990s–until the moment, that is, when a generation of young Beurs, as the children of North African immigrants call themselves, had reached an age at which they could begin to demand information about their parents' fate. Professional or academic historians have lagged well behind amateurs in the attempt to discover what occurred on 17 October; investigative journalists, militants, and fiction writers like Smith, or the much more widely read detective novelist, Didier Daeninckx, kept a trace of the event alive during the thirty years when it had entered a "black hole" of memory.

- In 2013, Rachid Ouramdane produced a work during which Dorothée Munyaneza read out the names of victims of the massacre.
- In 2017, French comedian Jhon Rachid created a short film about the massacre, entitled Jour de Pluie (Rainy Day).
- In 2021, The massacre was the subject in the short animated film "Les larmes de la Seine" written by Yanis Belaid.
- The massacre and the French government's alleged cover-up are the subjects of Robert Goddard's 2022 novel, "This Is the Night They Come for You"

== See also ==
- Drownings at Nantes
- 14 July 1953 demonstration
- List of massacres in France
- Maghrebian community of Paris
- Oran massacre of 1962
- Sétif and Guelma massacre
- Fatima Bedar
- Charrone subway massacre

== Sources ==
In English

- Daniel A. Gordon (2000). "World Reactions to the 1961 Paris Pogrom" (PDF). University of Sussex Journal of Contemporary History. 1.
- Martin S. Alexander / J. F. V. Keiger: France and the Algerian War, 1954–62: Strategy, Operations and Diplomacy. S. 24, 2002, ISBN 0-7146-5297-0
- Jean-Paul Brunet, « Police Violence in Paris, October 1961 : Historical Sources, Methods and Conclusions ", The Historical Journal, 51, 1 (2008), p. 195–204.
- Patrice J Proulx / Susan Ireland (Hrsg.): Immigrant Narratives in Contemporary France. S. 47–55, 2001, ISBN 0-313-31593-0
- Jim House, Neil MacMaster (2006). Paris 1961: Algerians, State Terror, and Memory, Oxford: O. University Press, 2006 ISBN 0-19-924725-0
- Jim House, Neil MacMaster, « Time to move on : a reply to Jean-Paul Brunet ", The Historical Journal, 51, 1 (2008), p. 205–214.

In French

- Jean-Paul Brunet, Police Contre FLN: Le drame d'octobre 1961, Paris: Flammarion, 1999, 354 p.
- Jean-Paul Brunet, Charonne. Lumières sur une tragédie, Paris: Flammarion, 2003, 336 p.
- Didier Daeninckx: Meurtres pour mémoire, 1984, ISBN 2-07-040649-0 (novel)
- Alain Dewerpe, Charonne, 8 février 1962. Anthropologie historique d'un massacre d'Etat, Gallimard, 2006, 870p.
- Einaudi, Jean-Luc (1991). La bataille de Paris: 17 octobre 1961. Seuil. ISBN 2-02-013547-7.
- Einaudi, Jean-Luc; Rajsfus, Maurice (2001). Les silences de la police : 16 juillet 1942—17 octobre 1961. L'Esprit frappeur. ISBN 9782844051738. OCLC 57507719.
- Olivier LeCour Grandmaison, Le 17 octobre 1961 – Un crime d'État à Paris, collectif, Éditions La Dispute, 2001.
- Sylvie Thénault, " Le fantasme du secret d'État autour du 17 octobre 1961 ", Matériaux pour l'histoire de notre temps, n°58, April–June 2000, p. 70–76.
- Paul Thibaud, "17 Octobre 1961: un moment de notre histoire," in Esprit, November 2001 (concerning the debate between Einaudi and Brunet)
