= Charonne subway massacre =

1962 massacre in Paris, France

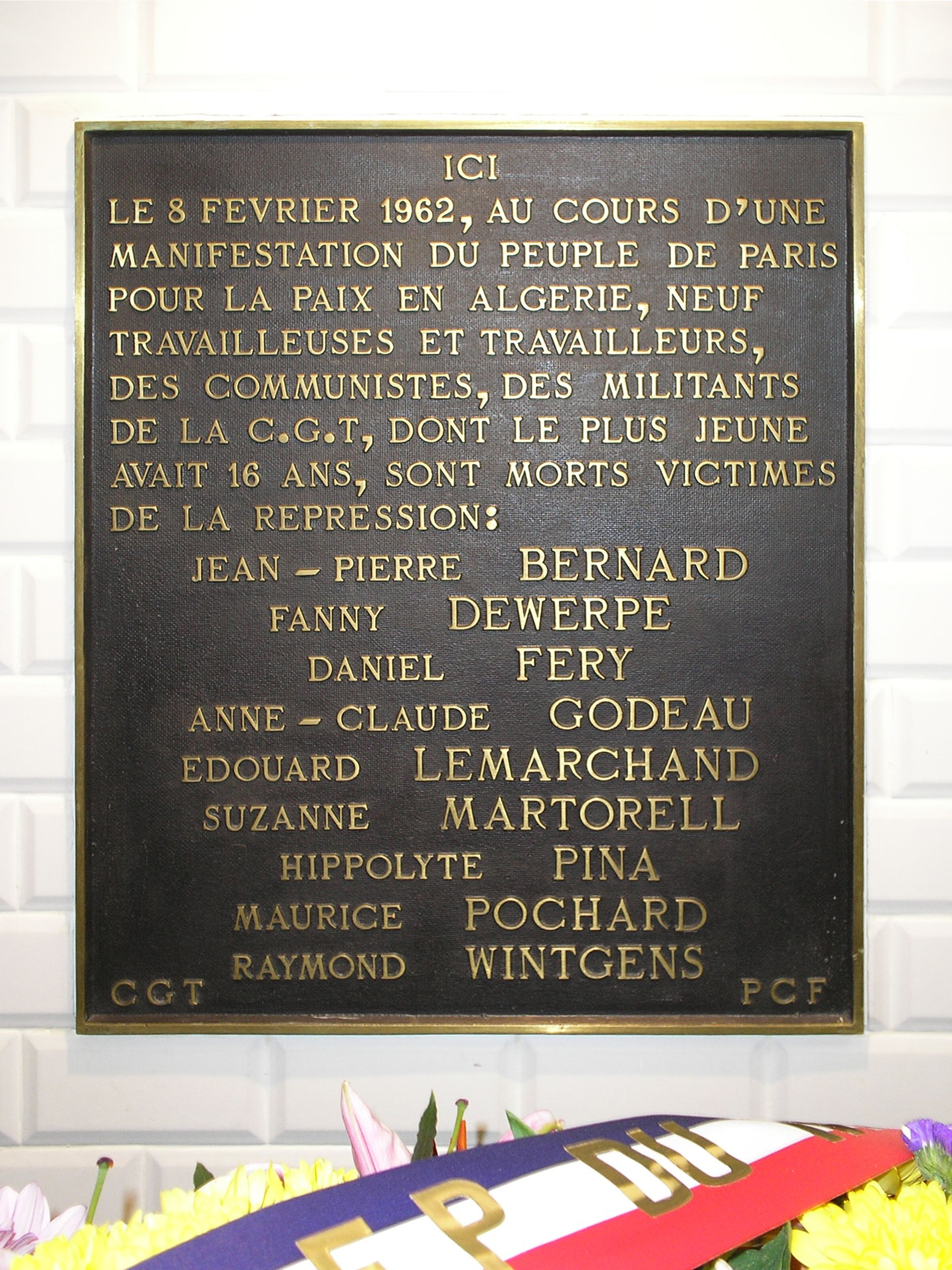
- Commemorative plaque at the Charonne subway station
- Date: 8 February 1962
- Location: Charonne metro station
- Type: Civilian massacre by the police
- Perpetrator: French police
- Deaths: 9
- Injuries: 250

The massacre at the Charonne metro station of 8 February 1962 was an incident that took place around and in the Charonne metro station in Paris, during a demonstration against the Secret Armed Organization (OAS) and the Algerian War, which resulted in the death of nine people crushed in the doorway of the metro station.

The demonstration, organized by the French Communist Party and other left-wing organizations, had been banned, and the prefect of police of Paris, Maurice Papon, had given the order to repress it, with the agreement of the Minister of the Interior, Roger Frey, and the President of the Republic, Charles de Gaulle.

Among the demonstrators who tried to take refuge in the metro station, eight people died due to suffocation or skull fractures, and a ninth protestor died in hospital, as a result of his injuries.

== Background ==
Until 1960, demonstrations against the war in Algeria brought together only a few hundred participants, mostly intellectuals who denounced the torture and expeditious methods of the French army in Algeria.

After the week of the barricades in Algiers in 1960, the CGT, CFTC, FO and FEN trade union centers overcome their differences to work together for the peace movement in Algeria. After the failure of the Melun talks conducted in the summer of 1960 between the French government and the GPRA, the student union UNEF took the initiative to contact the trade union organizations to organize demonstrations to encourage the government to resume negotiations. The first demonstration of a certain magnitude took place on 27 October 1960. A meeting had been authorized at the Maison de la Mutualité in Paris, but thousands of people, especially students, who were unable to enter the hall, came up against the forces of the police. Processions that formed in the Latin Quarter were dispersed with beatings. Police violence also affected passers-by and journalists. According to Jean-Paul Brunet, the repression of this demonstration revealed the bias of the police forces, which reacted much more sluggishly against supporters of French Algeria.

Smaller demonstrations were held during the first 9 months of 1961 and were easily dispersed by the police. The protests started to grow in the fall with the apparent breakdown of negotiations between the French government and the GPRA.

On 17 October 1961, a demonstration of some 30,000 pro-National Liberation Front (FLN) Algerians was attacked by the French Police under orders of the head of the Parisian police, Maurice Papon (who was convicted in 1998 for crimes against humanity for his role under the collaborationist regime of Vichy France). Several protestors were killed during the attack, either by shots, heavy hand beating or were drowned. There were also cases of torture and executions of arrested protestors. For several days, corpses were found on the surface of the river Seine. The French government denied the events and censored the press, until 1998, when it acknowledged 40 deaths.

The repression of the 17 October demonstration provoked a movement of indignation in left-wing circles but did not generate any massive response.

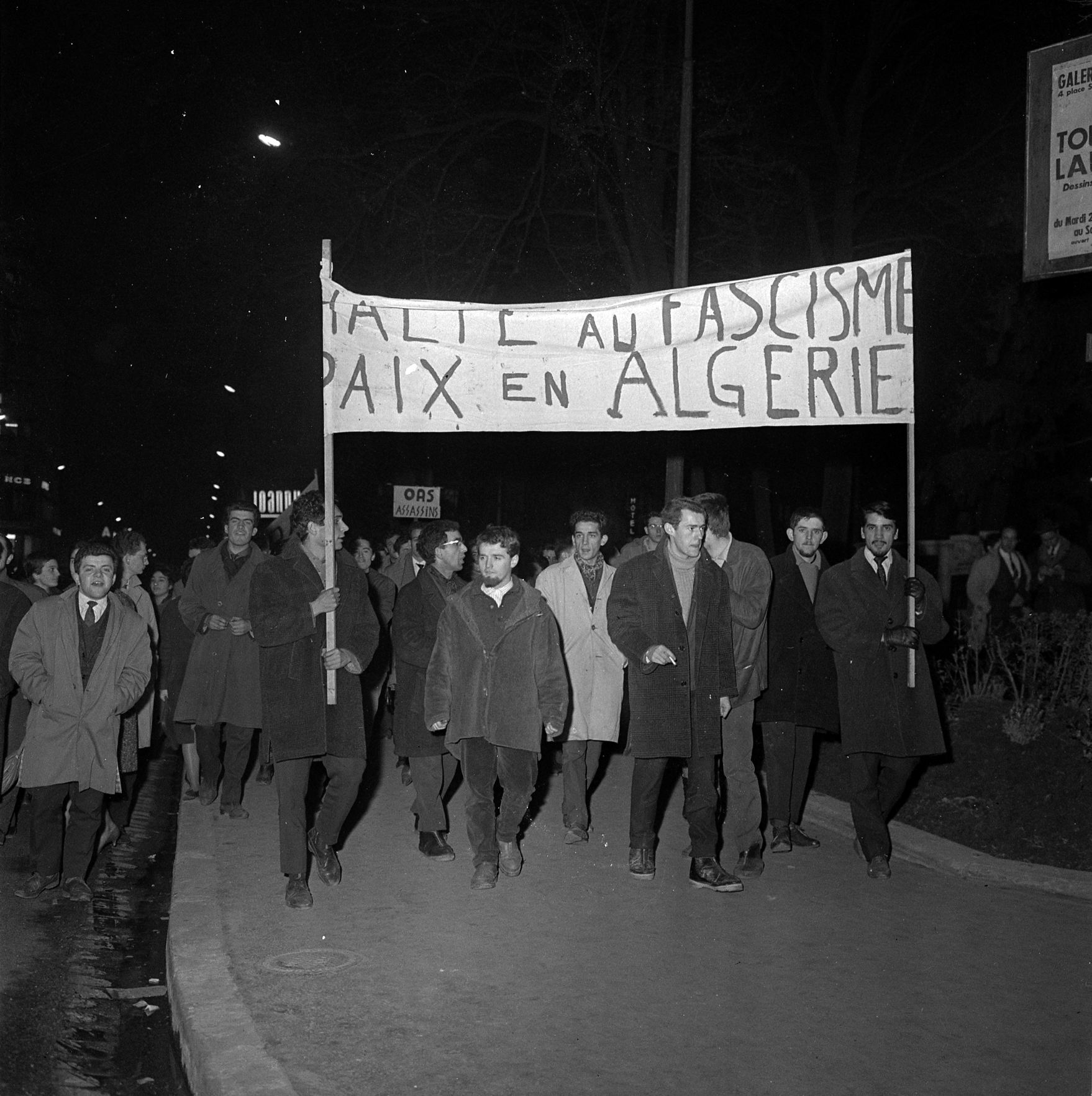
Protest against the OAS in Toulouse, 16 January 1962.

From November 1961, protests with thousands of inhabitants started taking place again. The demonstration were both to stimulate the peace process and to demand from the government a more resolute attitude against the far-right paramilitary OAS.

The demonstration of 19 December 1961 - convened in the Paris region by the CGT, the CFTC and the UNEF was part of a "day of action against the OAS and for peace in Algeria". The police let the demonstrators gather in Bastille but opposed any movement by part of the protestors. The director general of the municipal police reported 20,000 demonstrators. Among these, some refused to obey the dispersal orders given by the police and were charged. Young demonstrators fought back. The clashes resulted in 40 wounded among the police and hundreds among the protestors, two thirds of which women.

At the beginning of 1962, under the impetus of André Canal, the OAS multiplied the attacks in the Paris region. On 4 January 1962, a commando in a car machine-gunned the Communist Party building on Place Kossuth, seriously injuring a militant on the 2nd floor balcony. The communist demonstration of protest of 6 January 1962 took place without notable incident. On 24 January 1962, there were 21 explosions in the Seine department, targeting supposedly personalities or organizations hostile to OAS.

In the afternoon of 7 February, ten plastic charges exploded in the homes of various personalities: two law professors, Roger Pinto and Georges Vedel, two journalists, Serge Bromberger, from Le Figaro, and Vladimir Pozner, seriously injured, two officers and Communist senator Raymond Guyot, whose wife was injured. A final attack aimed at André Malraux disfigured a 4-year-old girl, Delphine Renard.

== Protest of 8 February 1962 ==
=== Call to protest ===
The Communist Party and the CGT were determined to act quickly. The CFTC, which wondered about the type of action to be implemented, opted for the organization of a mass demonstration. The evening of 7 February, the leaders of the CGT and the CFTC met and decided to call for a massive demonstration the next day. The FEN and the UNEF were also represented at this meeting. A leaflet of appeal was thus drawn up:

ALL IN MASS, tonight at 18:30, Bastille

The OAS assassins have redoubled their activity. Several times during the day on Wednesday, the OAS attempted against the lives of political, trade union, academic, press and literary figures. Injuries are to be deplored; the writer Pozner is in serious condition. A 4-year-old girl is seriously injured. We must put an end to these actions of the Fascist killers. It is necessary to impose their putting out of harm's way. The complicity and impunity from which they benefit from the power, despite speeches and official declarations, encourage the criminal acts of the OAS.

Once again, the proof is made that the anti-fascists can only count on their forces, on their union, on their action. The undersigned organizations call on workers and all anti-fascists in the Paris region to proclaim their indignation, their desire to defeat fascism and impose peace in Algeria.

The text was signed by the trade unions CGT, CFTC, UNEF, SGEN, FEN and SNI. The PCF, the PSU and the Mouvement de la paix were associated with the call.

=== Prohibition of the demonstration ===
Maurice Papon met on the morning of 8 February with a trade union delegation made up of André Tollet for the CGT, Robert Duvivier for the CFTC and Tony Dreyfus for the UNEF. Papon informed them that the decree of 23 April 1961, taken at the time of the Algiers putsch of 1961, remained valid and prohibited demonstrations on the public highway. The delegates informed that they would maintain the peaceful demonstration. No other unofficial contact took place.

When questioned, General Intelligence predicted 10,000 to 15,000 demonstrators. The prefecture, revising these forecasts downwards, was counting on a range of 6,000 to 7,000 and set up 13 intervention companies (CI), i.e. 1,000 seasoned police officers, 11 mobile gendarmerie squadrons, i.e. 825 men supposedly less seasoned than the first, 3 Republican Security Companies (CRS), i.e. 360 men and a few hundred General Service "peacekeepers". There were therefore fewer law enforcement personnel than on 19 December 1961 - when the police headquarters had put 5,556 officers in front of the demonstrators, but more than on 17 October 1961 - when 1,658 officers were in front of the 20,000 or 30,000 protesters. Each squadron of mobile gendarmes is normally paired with an intervention company, and the whole is under the command of a commissaire de police.

The instructions given to the police were to proceed from 6 p.m. to the mixing and dispersal of the demonstrators on the places of assembly, with arrests in the event of refusal. From 6:30 p.m., each officer was recommended to be "especially active", and not to tolerate any gatherings. If the number and the actions of the demonstrators made it necessary, the police should "show their energy" and use tear gas canisters and defense batons. Defense sticks commonly referred to as "bidules" were hardwood sticks 85 cm long and 4 cm in diameter. They were distributed to the police before contact with the demonstrators.

At 2:00 p.m., the organizers of the demonstration broadcast a press release on the radio asking the demonstrators to show the greatest calm. At the beginning of the afternoon, the unions were instructed to try to reach the Bastille by five processions formed at 6:30 p.m. at four metro stations (Ledru-Rollin, Sully - Morland, Filles du Calvaire and Gare de Lyon) and St. Antoine Street. They should stop 50 or 75 meters from the police lines. The leaders of the processions should then read the press release prepared during the night and give the order to disperse at 7:30 p.m. According to Brunet, the organizers knew that the processions had little chance of reaching the Bastille, but they believed that the police would not charge static demonstrators.

=== Gathering of the demonstrators ===
The processions could not be formed, as planned, at the various metro stations. The Gare de Lyon procession was an exception. The rue Saint-Antoine being blocked by the police, thousands of demonstrators found themselves on the Left Bank and were finally blocked on the boulevard Saint-Michel. The organizers read the text and the demonstration was dispersed without violence.

The first clashes take place on Boulevard Beaumarchais where a few thousand demonstrators were massed. In the Bastille - Chemin-Vert sector, the security forces charged the demonstrators without having, it seems, been attacked, while in the northern sector of Boulevard Beaumarchais, groups of demonstrators were much more aggressive and took the initiative to launch projectiles or storm police vans.

Part of the procession which should have formed at the Filles du Calvaire metro station ended up at the Voltaire - Charonne crossroads where it found a group which should have formed a procession at the Ledru-Rollin metro station and the procession which had been able to form at the Lyons station. With demonstrators turned back from Boulevard Beaumarchais, that made some 4,000 people who found themselves at the crossroads of Boulevard Voltaire and Rue de Charonne.

=== Repression at the Charonne metro ===
One of the processions, whose head was at boulevard Voltaire 200, two hundred meters beyond the Voltaire - Charonne crossroads, heading towards the Place de la Nation, was charged by a unit of the special companies of intervention by the police headquarters when the dispersal order had just been given and the procession was beginning to disperse: "When the police charged, the first row of demonstrators had turned around and was looking in the direction of Place Léon-Blum, because they wanted to show that the demonstration was over and that we had to break up. So they couldn't see the police coming and I saw them fall immediately."

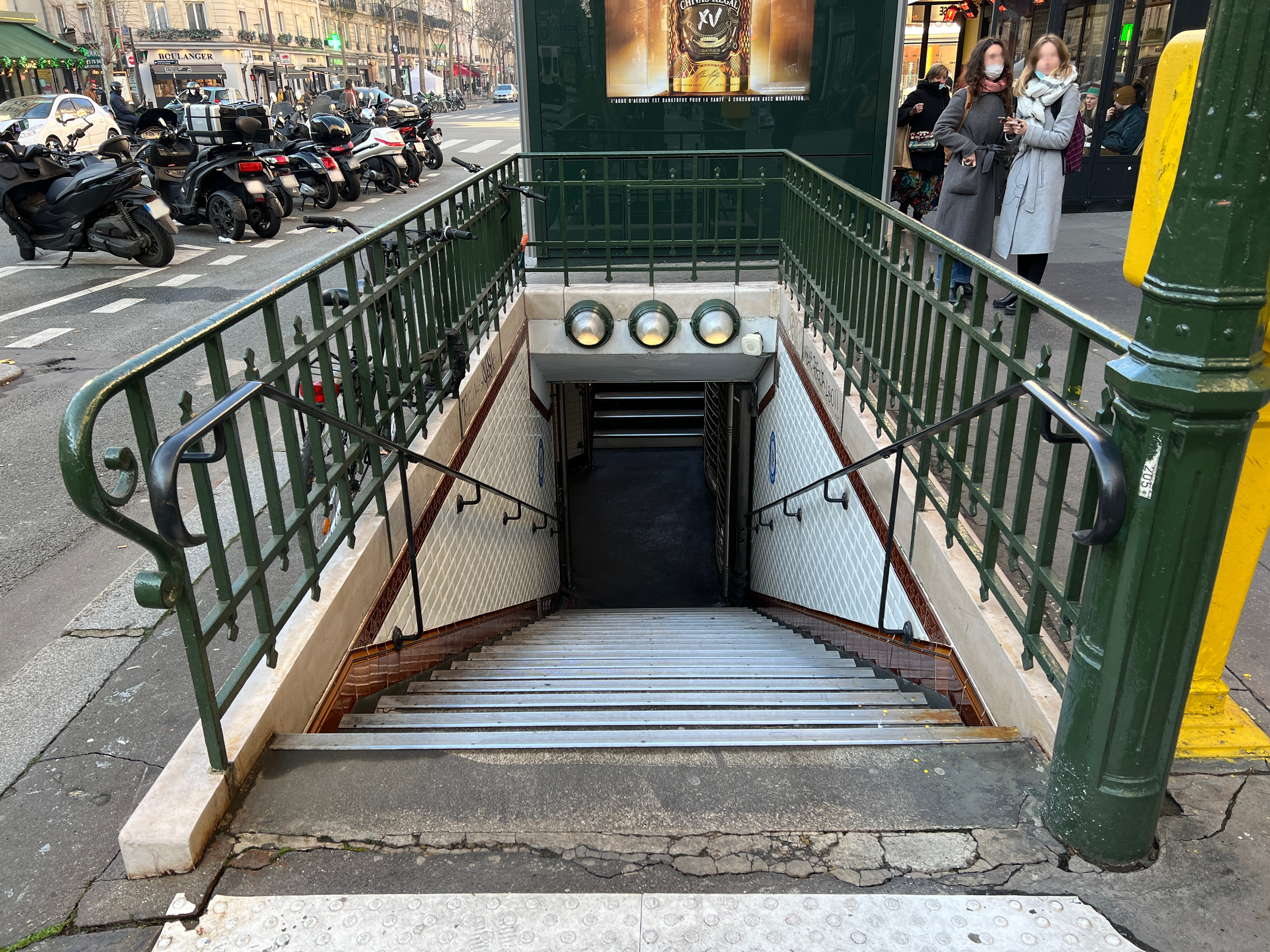
One of the entrances to the Charonne station.

The action came from the 31st Division, commanded by Commissar Yser, to whom the order to charge "Disperse energetically" had just been given by the Prefecture at 7:37 p.m. At the same time, Commissar Dauvergne, commanding the 61st division, received the order to block the boulevard Voltaire in the direction of the place Léon-Blum, so as to force the demonstrators into a more constrained movement. There were therefore no other possible exits for the demonstrators than the small side streets, the carriage entrances of the buildings, where some managed to take refuge, sometimes pursued up to the upper floors by the police, or the entrances to the Charonne metro station. Some of the demonstrators tried to take refuge in one of these metro entrances, the gates of which, according to the official version of the Ministry of the Interior, had been closed. In reality, it is now established that at the time of the police charge, the gates of the metro station were open, that the police pursued the demonstrators inside the corridors and on the platforms of the station, as this is proven by the fact that, in some cases, the bodies were evacuated by the metro and could be found in the neighboring stations Rue des Boulets - Rue de Montreuil et Voltaire - Léon Blum, which explains the initial uncertainty about the causes of the deaths, which were only established at the autopsy.

In the mouth of the metro, the crowding caused the fall of several people on whom the following piled up, clubbed by the police who projected gratings of trees on them, as well as ventilation grilles of the metro unsealed for this purpose. The public prosecutor writes:

Mention should be made here of the fact reported by certain witnesses, heard at the inquest, who indicated that they had witnessed acts of violence committed by some members of the police and which appeared to be highly reprehensible. These include the throwing of elements of iron grilles, which are normally fixed to the perimeter of the trees of the avenue, and of ventilation grilles of the metro, which are regularly found at the level of the sidewalks of the roadway. These metal parts are very heavy (40kg for the first, 26kg for the seconds). Some witnesses said they saw officers throwing grates at protesters inside the subway entrance. This fact seems established, and it is common ground that at least three of these grilles were found after the demonstration at the bottom of the stairs at the metro entrance and recovered there by station employees.

Thus, it was indeed the "grids" launched by the police that were the origin of certain deaths. The metro station was not closed until 8:15 p.m., due to the persistence of tear gas, following the intervention of the police in the station. In the immediate future, there were eight victims. Some died of suffocation; in other cases, the death appeared to be due to fractures of the skull under the effect of baton blows received. Such was also the cause of the ninth death, which occurred several months later, in hospital, as a result of these injuries. All the victims were union members of the CGT and, with one exception, members of the Communist Party:

- Jean-Pierre Bernard, 30 years old;
- Fanny Dewerpe, 31 years old;
- Daniel Féry, 15 years old;
- Anne-Claude Godeau, 24 years old;
- Hippolyte Pina, 58 years old;
- Édouard Lemarchand, 40 years old;
- Suzanne Martorell, 36 years old;
- Raymond Wintgens, 44 years old;
- Maurice Pochard, 48 years old.

More than 250 injured were also counted, according to L'Humanité.

== Reactions ==
The Prime Minister, Michel Debré, went to the premises of the Paris police on 12 February 1962, to "bring the testimony of his confidence and his admiration"; then, on 13 April of the same year, he wrote a letter to Papon, paying "a particular tribute to [his] qualities as a leader and organizer, as well as to the way in which [he] knew how to carry out a mission often delicate and difficult".

The repression aroused great emotion and work stoppages were widely followed. All activity was interrupted in the Paris region and a crowd estimated at several hundred thousand people (one million, according to L'Humanité, 400,000 according to The Times, from 300,000 to 500,000 according to Le Monde and Paris Jour (the latter favorable to the government), 150,000 according to Le Figaro, from 125,000 to 150,000 according to the Prefecture), in a large and imposing demonstration from the Place de la République to the Père-Lachaise cemetery, paid tribute to the victims and attended their funerals.

On 17 June 1966, an amnesty law was passed, covering in particular the repression of the demonstrations of 1961 and 1962.

== Commemoration ==
After the victory of François Mitterrand in the presidential election of 1981 and the arrival of the left in power, a commemoration plaque was raised in the Charonne metro station to honor the victims of the victims of the 1962 massacre. The plaque was announced on the 20th anniversary of the event and raised on 20 March 1982.
