= Paris Police Prefecture =

Law enforcement agency of Paris

Coordinates: 48.8544°N 2.3468°E

Police Prefecture Préfecture de police
- Logo

Agency overview
- Formed: 1667; Dissolved in 1789, refounded in 1800

Jurisdictional structure
- Operations jurisdiction: Paris & Petite Couronne in the Île-de-France region, France
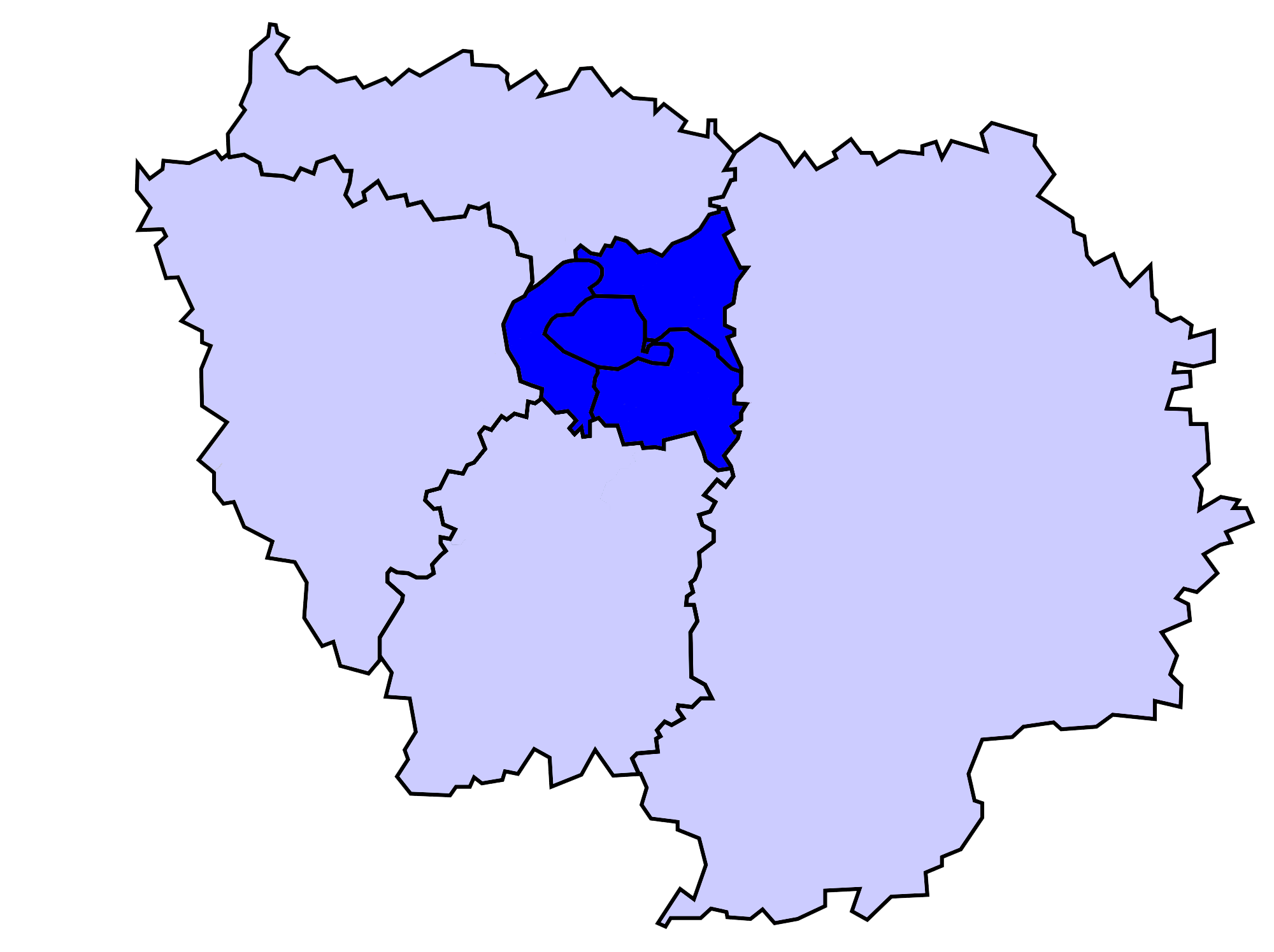
- Map of Police Prefecture's jurisdiction
- Area: 762 km²
- Population: 6,673,591 (Jan. 1, 2010)

Operational structure
- Headquarters: Paris
- Sworn members: 34,000
- Agency executive: Patrice Faure, Préfet de police
- Districts: 15

Facilities
- Stations: 87

Website
- www.prefecturedepolice.interieur.gouv.fr

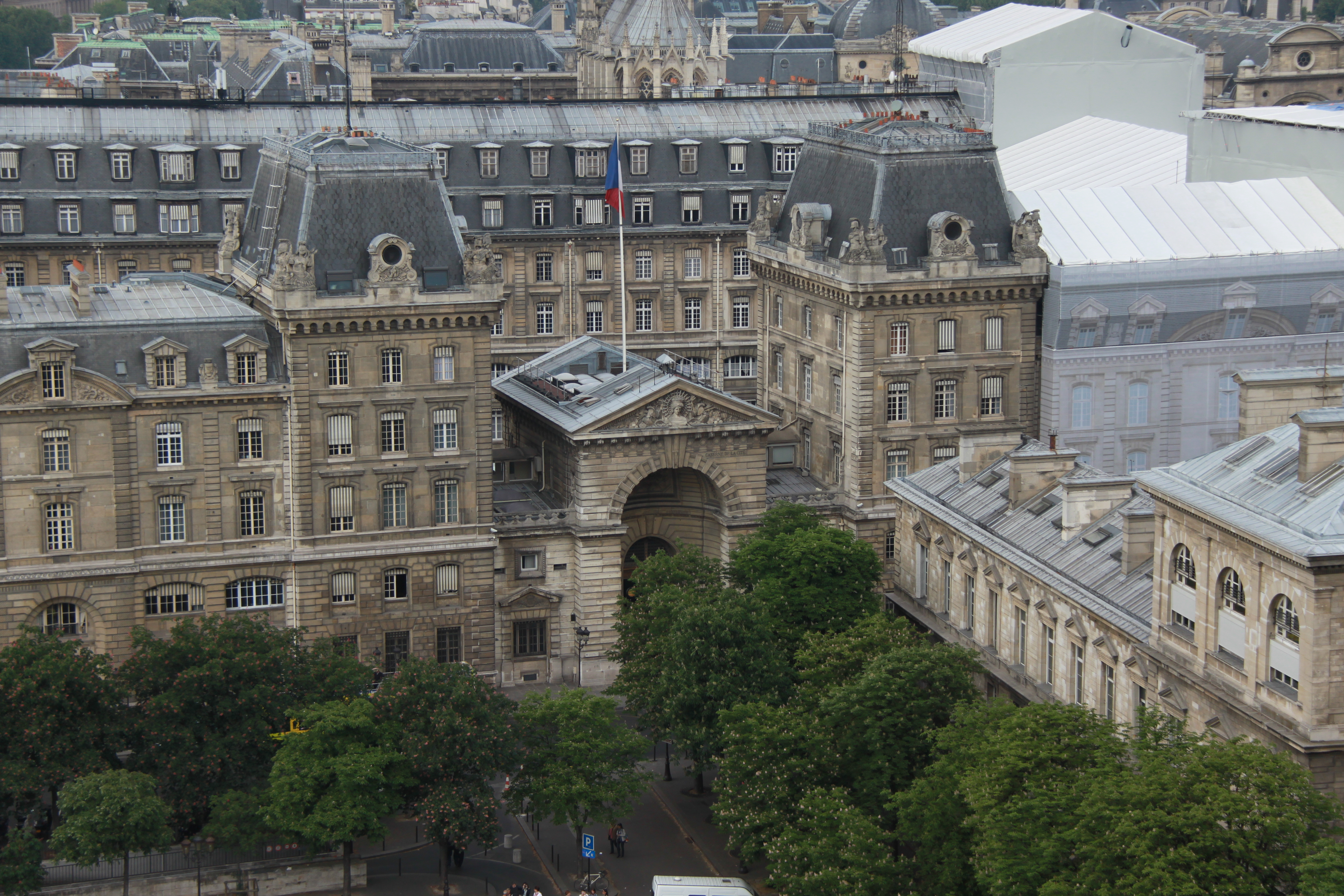
East façade of the Caserne de la Cité, seat of the Police Prefecture viewed from Notre-Dame de Paris, with the Hôtel-Dieu hospital on the right

The Paris Police Prefecture (French: préfecture de police de Paris [pʁefɛktyʁ də pɔlis də paʁi]), officially the Police Prefecture (préfecture de police), is the unit of the French Ministry of the Interior that provides police, emergency services, and various administrative services to the population of the city of Paris and the surrounding three suburban départements of Hauts-de-Seine, Seine-Saint-Denis, and Val-de-Marne. It is headed by the Paris Prefect of Police (le Préfet de police de Paris), officially called the Prefect of Police (le Préfet de police), and since 1871 has been headquartered in the Caserne de la Cité, a prominent building erected in 1863-1867.

The Paris Police Prefecture supervises the Paris Police force, the Paris Fire Brigade, and various administrative departments in charge of issuing ID cards and driver licenses or monitoring alien residents. The Prefecture of Police also has security duties in the wider Île-de-France région as the Préfet de Police is also Préfet de Zone de Défense (Prefect for the Defense zone). Since 2017, it has acquired direct responsibility for the three main airports of the Paris area (Charles de Gaulle, Orly and Le Bourget).

In addition to the Préfecture de Police, the French government created the Paris Municipal Police (French: Police municipale de Paris) in 2021. In contrast with the Préfecture, the municipal police report to the city government, rather than to the national government. Municipal police officers began patrolling city streets on foot, bicycle, and by car starting on October 18, 2021. The goal of the municipal police is to "make neighbourhoods safer and more peaceful and ensure that public space is shared," for example by enforcing laws on parking, littering, breaking up quarrels, and assisting homeless or elderly residents.

As it is the capital of France, with government assemblies and offices and foreign embassies, Paris poses special issues of security and public order. Consequently, the national government has been responsible for providing law enforcement and emergency services since the creation of the Lieutenancy General of Police (lieutenance générale de police) by Louis XIV on March 15, 1667. Disbanded at the start of the French Revolution in 1789, it was replaced by the current Prefecture of Police created by Napoleon on February 17, 1800. This means that, up until 2021, Paris did not have its own police municipale and that the Police Nationale provided all of these services directly as a subdivision of France's Ministry of the Interior.

Policemen assigned to "la PP" are part of the Police nationale but the Police Prefect reports directly to the Interior Minister, not to the director of the Police nationale (Directeur général de la Police nationale or DGPN). In Parisian slang, the police were sometimes known as "the archers", a very old slang term in reference to the archers of the long-defunct Royal Watch.

Paris also has the "Direction de la Prévention, de la Sécurité et de la Protection" (DPSP) (Prevention, Security and Protection Directorate) which is composed of Agents with municipal police powers titled inspecteurs de sécurité (Security Inspectors). The DPSP reports to the Mayor of Paris.

== Jurisdiction ==
The jurisdiction of the Prefecture of Police was initially the Seine département. Its jurisdiction also included the communes (municipalities) of Saint-Cloud, Sèvres, Meudon, and Enghien-les-Bains, which were located in the Seine-et-Oise département. These four communes were added in the 19th century to the jurisdiction of the Prefecture of Police in order to ensure special protection of the imperial/royal residences located there.

The Seine département was disbanded in 1968 and the jurisdiction of the Prefecture of Police is now the city of Paris (which is both a commune and a département) and the three surrounding départements of Hauts-de-Seine, Seine-Saint-Denis, Val-de-Marne. This territory made up of four départements is larger than the pre-1968 Seine département.

The Prefecture of Police also has limited jurisdiction over the whole Île-de-France région for the coordination of law enforcement, including combatting cybercrime. The Prefect of Police, acting as Prefect of the Defense Zone of Paris (Préfet de la Zone de Défense de Paris), is in charge of planning non-military defense measures to keep public order, guarantee the security of public services, and organize rescue operations (in case of natural disaster) for the whole Île-de-France région (which is made up of eight départements, the four inner ones being the regular jurisdiction of the Prefecture of Police, and the four outer ones being outside of its regular jurisdiction). As such, he coordinates the work of the departmental préfets of Île-de-France.

== Nomination and missions ==
Headed by a prefect titled The "Prefect of Police", who (as are all prefects) is named by the President in the Council of Ministers, and operates under the Minister of the Interior, commands the Prefecture which is responsible for the following:

- security of Paris, if necessary in collaboration with the military;
- issuing identification cards, driver's licenses, passports, residential and work permits for foreigners;
- motor vehicle registration and traffic control;
- registration of associations, and their creation, status modification and dissolution;
- protection of the environment, general salubrity;
- determining the dates of discount sales in large stores which can be held only twice a year;
- issuing permits to bakeries/boulangeries for their summer vacation to assure that all the bakeries in a given neighborhood are not closed at the same time;
- management of police and firefighters.

The Prefect of Police can issue arrêtés (local writs) defining rules pertaining to his field of competency. For instance, the rules of operation and security of Paris public parks are issued as joint arrêtés from the Mayor of Paris and the Prefect of Police.

Until 1977, Paris had indeed no elected mayor and the police was essentially in the hands of the préfet de police. However, the powers of the mayor of Paris were increased at the expense of those of the Préfet de Police in 2002, notably for traffic and parking decisions (the préfet retains the responsibility on main thoroughfares such as the Avenue des Champs-Élysées, and on any street during the organization of demonstrations).

There is also a prefect of Paris, prefect for the Île-de-France region, whose services handle some tasks not devoted to the Police Prefect, such as certain classes of building permits.

== Address ==
- Postal address: 1 bis, rue de Lutèce, 75004 Paris (métro Cité)
- Tel: 01 54 73 53 73, 01 53 71 53 71, 01 40 79 79 79.
- Emergency telephone number: 1-1-2
  - Emergency medical service SAMU/SMUR (Hospital Based) 1-5
  - Police 1-7
  - Fire Brigade (Operates emergency ambulances as EMS) 1-8

== Organization ==
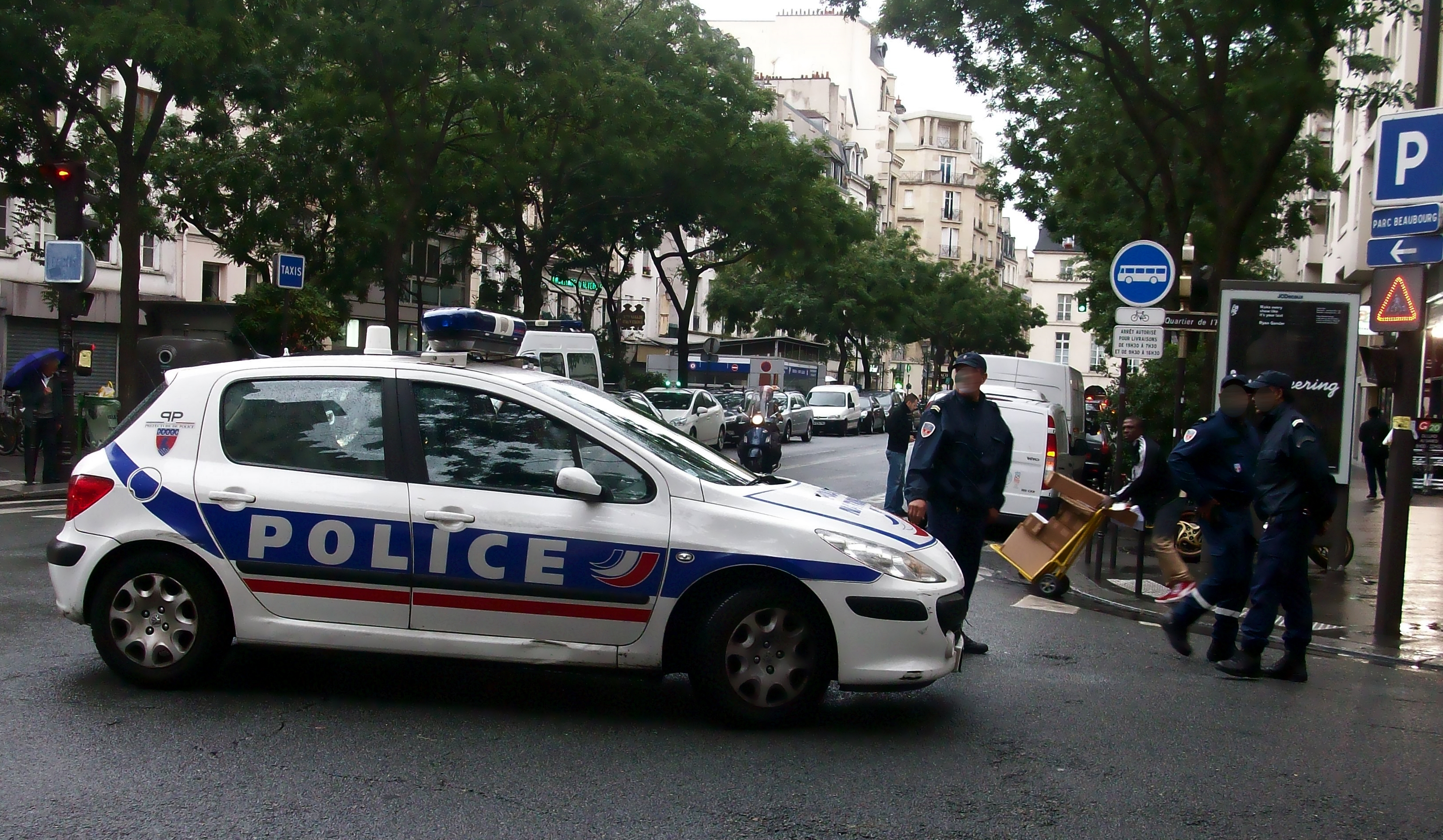
Peugeot 307 of the Paris Police Prefecture.

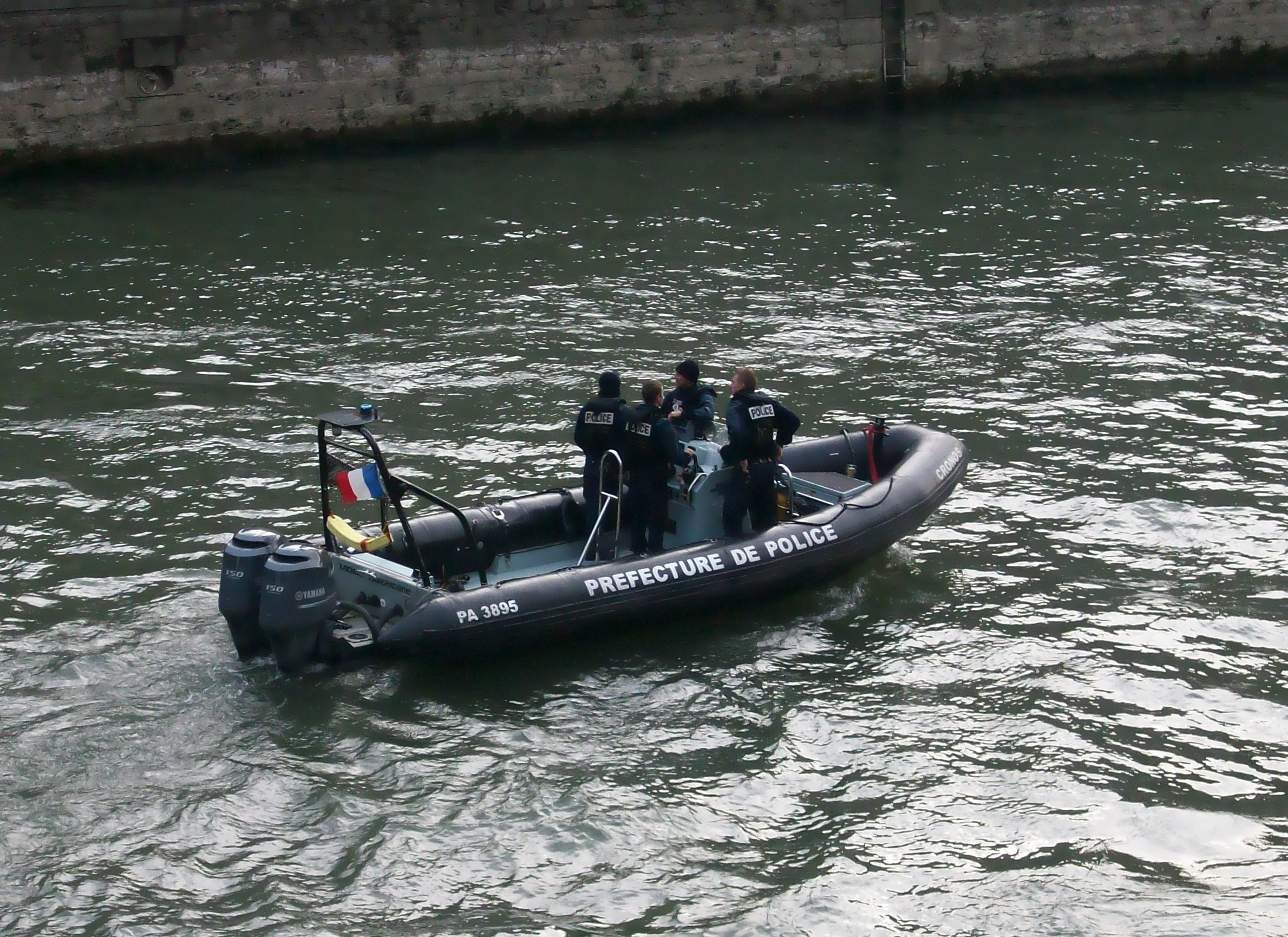
Police boat

The PP is headed by a politically appointed prefect who is assisted by the prevote, who is the senior police officer of the force. The Prefecture of Police is divided into three sub-prefectures headed by prefects due to their importance.

Because the Police Prefecture provides some services that are normally provided by city governments, its funding partially comes from the City of Paris and other city governments within its jurisdiction.

In addition to forces from the National Police, the Police Prefecture has traffic wardens or crossing guards who enforce parking rules; it has recently added some wardens that direct traffic at crossroads and other similar duties, known as circulation, with specific uniforms.

== Prefect and Director of the Cabinet ==
Consists of the Cabinet (staff) itself, the Gendarmerie Nationale Liaison Office, and 6 Local Directorates:

- Public Security – uniformed police officers
  - Lost and Found Property
  - Central Accident Service
- Public Order and Traffic Control – uniformed police who protect public buildings, provide crowd and traffic control services
- Judicial Police (Police judiciaire) – detectives and investigators (the 36 quai des Orfèvres)
- General Information – records
- Inspectorate – internal affairs
- Paris Fire Brigade – the military unit which provides all fire and emergency ambulance services (other emergency medical services are provided by SAMU/SMUR)

and other agencies:

- Classified Facility Inspectorate
- Psychiatric Infirmary
- Toxicology Laboratory
- Central Laboratory-explosives, pollution, chemical analysis, electrical and fire safety, etc.

== Prefect and Secretary-General for the Administration of the Police ==
with four Administrative Directorates:

- General Police – Administrative police duties
  - Medico-Legal Institute
- Traffic, Transport, and Trade
- Population Protection – public health matters
  - Veterinary Service
- Human Resources – personnel, budget, equipment and police labor disputes

== Prefect and Secretary-General for the Zone of Defence ==
with two agencies:

- Defence Zone staff
- Interdepartmental Service for Civil Defence

== Resources ==
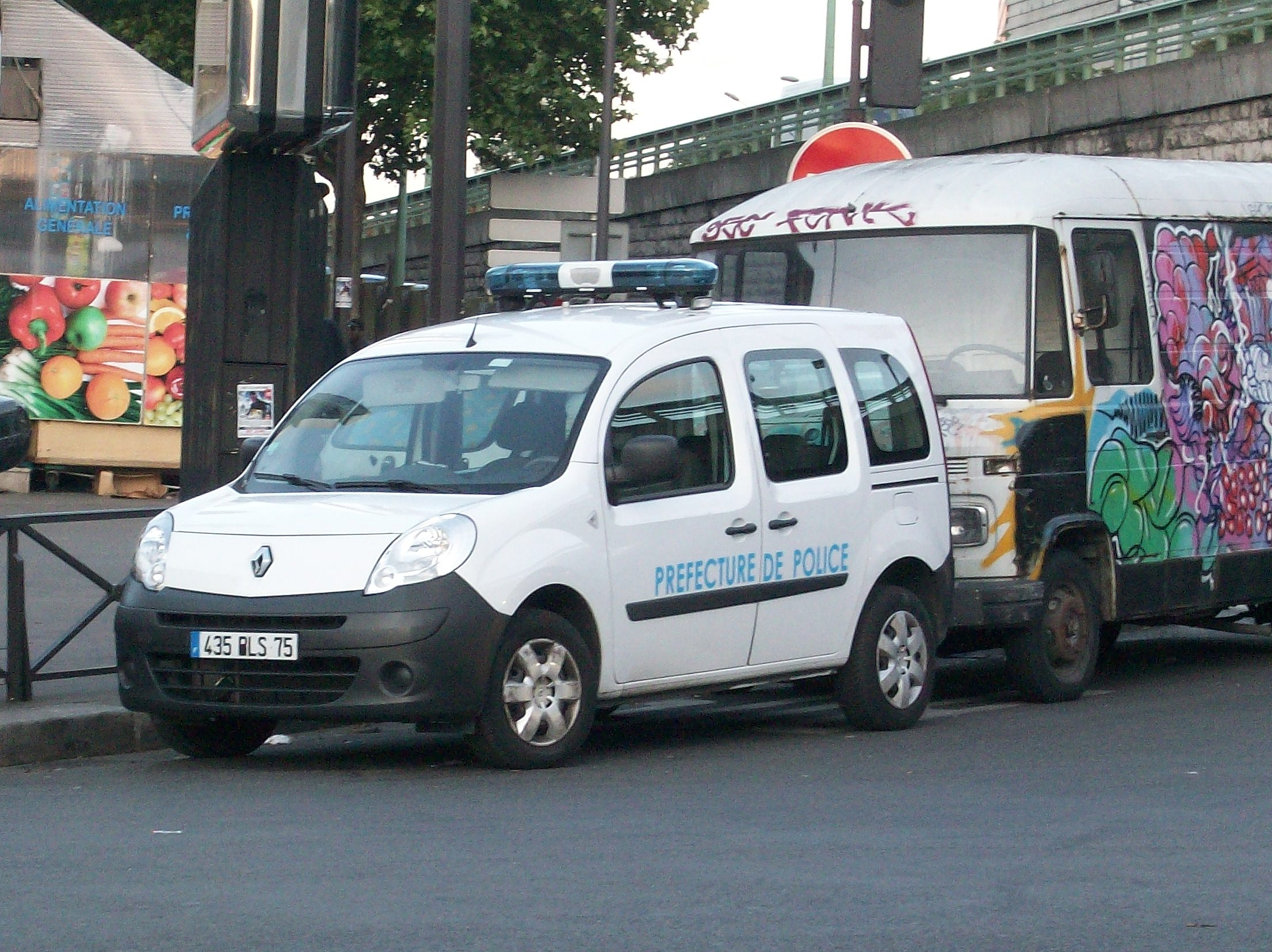
Renault Kangoo of the Prefecture of Police of Paris

- Budget:
  - One billion Euros by National government
  - 488 million Euros by Paris and surrounding departments of the Petite Couronne
- Personnel:
  - 45,860 employees, of which 30,200 police officers
  - 8,300 Military Personnel of the Paris Fire Brigade
- 494 Facilities, stations, and offices
- 6,120 vehicles – including police cars, fire trucks, motorcycles, boats, and helicopters

== Activities ==
- 350,000 incidents of crime reports
- two million administrative documents issues
- 200,000 drivers licenses issued

== List of lieutenant generals and prefects of police ==
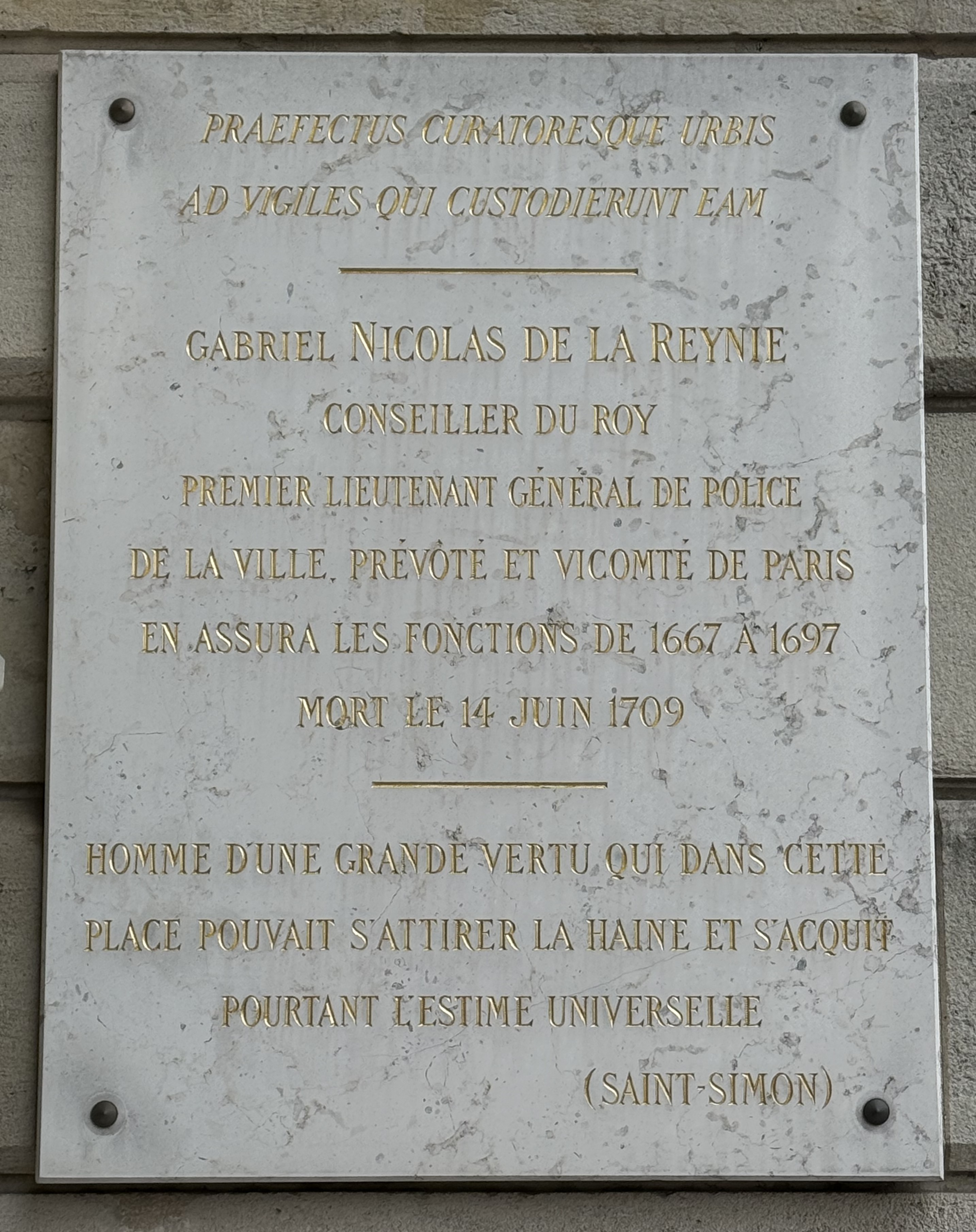
Plaque honoring Gabriel Nicolas de la Reynie flanking the monumental entrance of the Police Prefecture building on rue de la Cité

Before the French Revolution, the head of the Paris Police was the lieutenant général de police, whose office was created in March 1667 when the first modern police force in the world was set up by the government of King Louis XIV to police the city of Paris. The office vanished at the start of the French Revolution and police was vested in the hands of the Paris Commune. Reorganized by Napoléon Bonaparte in 1800, the Paris Police has been headed by the préfet de police since that time.

=== Lieutenant generals of police ===
- Gabriel Nicolas de la Reynie: March 29, 1667 – January 29, 1697
- Marc René de Voyer de Paulmy, marquis d'Argenson: January 29, 1697 – January 28, 1718
- Louis Charles de Machault d'Arnouville (father of French statesman Jean-Baptiste de Machault d'Arnouville): January 28, 1718 – January 26, 1720
- Marc Pierre de Voyer de Paulmy, comte d'Argenson (son of Marc René): January 26 – July 1, 1720
- Gabriel Taschereau de Baudry: July 1, 1720 – April 26, 1722
- Marc Pierre de Voyer de Paulmy, comte d'Argenson: April 26, 1722 – January 28, 1724
- Nicolas Ravot d'Ombreval: January 28, 1724 – August 28, 1725
- René Hérault (grandfather of French Revolution politician Hérault de Séchelles): August 28, 1725 – December 21, 1739
- Claude-Henri Feydeau de Marville: December 21, 1739 – May 27, 1747
- Nicolas René Berryer: May 27, 1747 – October 29, 1757
- Henri Léonard Jean-Baptiste Bertin: October 29, 1757 – November 21, 1759
- Antoine de Sartine: November 21, 1759 – August 24, 1774
- Jean Charles Pierre Lenoir: August 24, 1774 – May 14, 1775
- Joseph d'Albert: May 14, 1775 – June 19, 1776
- Jean Charles Pierre Lenoir: June 19, 1776 – July 31, 1785
- Louis Thiroux de Crosne: July 31, 1785 – July 16, 1789

Source: Centre historique des Archives nationales, Série Y, Châtelet de Paris, on page 38 of the PDF.

=== Prefects of police ===
- Louis-Nicolas Dubois: March 8, 1800 – October 14, 1810
- Étienne-Denis Pasquier: October 14, 1810 – May 13, 1814
- Jacques Claude Beugnot: May 13 – December 27, 1814
- Antoine Balthazar Joachim d'André: December 27, 1814 – March 14, 1815
- Louis Antoine Fauvelet de Bourrienne: March 14 – March 20, 1815
- Pierre-François Réal: March 20 – July 3, 1815
- Eustache Marie Pierre Marc-Antoine Courtin: July 3 – July 9, 1815
- Élie Decazes: July 9 – September 29, 1815
- Jules Anglès: September 29, 1815 – December 20, 1821
- Guy Delavau: December 20, 1821 – January 6, 1828
- Louis-Marie de Belleyme: January 6, 1828 – August 13, 1829
- Claude Mangin: August 13, 1829 – July 30, 1830
- Nicolas Bavoux: July 30 – August 1, 1830
- Louis Gaspard Amédée Girod de l'Ain: August 1 – November 7, 1830
- Achille Libéral Treilhard: November 7 – December 26, 1830
- Jean Jacques Baude: December 26, 1830 – February 21, 1831
- Alexandre François Vivien: February 21 – September 17, 1831
- Sébastien Louis Saulnier: September 17 – October 15, 1831
- Henri Gisquet: October 15, 1831 – September 10, 1836
- Gabriel Delessert: September 10, 1836 – February 24, 1848
- Marc Caussidière: February 24 – May 18, 1848
- Ariste Jacques Trouvé-Chauvel: May 18 – July 19, 1848
- François-Joseph Ducoux: July 19 – October 14, 1848
- Guillaume François Gervais: October 14 – December 20, 1848
- Chéri Rebillot: December 20, 1848 – November 8, 1849
- Pierre Carlier: November 8, 1849 – October 27, 1851
- Charlemagne de Maupas: October 27, 1851 – January 22, 1852
- Sylvain Blot (acting): January 23 – January 27, 1852
- Pierre-Marie Piétri: January 27, 1852 – March 16, 1858
- Symphorien Boittelle: March 16, 1858 – February 21, 1866
- Joseph-Marie Piétri (younger brother of Pierre-Marie Piétri): February 21, 1866 – September 4, 1870
- Émile de Kératry: September 4 – October 10, 1870
- Edmond Adam (husband of French writer Juliette Adam): October 11 – November 2, 1870
- Ernest Cresson: November 2, 1870 – February 11, 1871
- Albert Choppin (acting): February 11 – March 16, 1871
- Louis Ernest Valentin: March 16 – November 17, 1871
- Léon Renault: November 17, 1871 – February 9, 1876
- Félix Voisin: February 9, 1876 – December 17, 1877
- Albert Gigot: December 17, 1877 – March 3, 1879
- Louis Andrieux (natural father of famous French poet Louis Aragon): March 4, 1879 – July 16, 1881
- Jean Louis Ernest Camescasse: July 16, 1881 – April 23, 1885
- Félix-Alexandre Gragnon: April 23, 1885 – November 17, 1887
- Léon Bourgeois: November 17, 1887 – March 10, 1888
- Henri Lozé: March 10, 1888 – July 11, 1893
- Louis Lépine: July 11, 1893 – October 14, 1897
- Charles Blanc: October 14, 1897 – June 23, 1899
- Louis Lépine: June 23, 1899 – March 29, 1913
- Célestin Hennion: March 30, 1913 – September 2, 1914
- Émile Marie Laurent: September 3, 1914 – June 3, 1917
- Louis Hudelo: June 3 – November 23, 1917
- Fernand Raux: November 23, 1917 – May 13, 1921
- Robert Leullier: May 14, 1921 – July 5, 1922
- Armand Naudin: July 5, 1922 – August 25, 1924
- Benoit Alfred Morain: August 25, 1924 – April 14, 1927
- Jean Chiappe: April 14, 1927 – February 3, 1934
- Adrien Bonnefoy-Sibour: February 3 – March 20, 1934
- Roger Langeron: March 20, 1934 – February 13, 1941
- Camille Marchand (acting): February 13 – May 14, 1941
- François Bard: May 14, 1941 – May 21, 1942
- Amédée Bussière: May 21, 1942 – August 19, 1944
- Charles Luizet: August 19, 1944 – March 20, 1947
- Armand Ziwès (acting): March 20 – May 27, 1947
- Roger Léonard: May 27, 1947 – May 2, 1951
- Jean Baylot: May 2, 1951 – July 13, 1954
- André Dubois: July 13, 1954 – November 21, 1955
- Roger Genebrier: November 21, 1955 – December 16, 1957
- André Lahillonne: December 16, 1957 – March 14, 1958
- Maurice Papon: March 15, 1958 – January 18, 1967
- Maurice Grimaud: January 18, 1967 – April 13, 1971
- Jacques Lenoir: April 13, 1971 – July 1, 1973
- Jean Paolini: July 1, 1973 – May 3, 1976
- Pierre Somveille: May 3, 1976 – August 8, 1981
- Jean Périer: August 8, 1981 – June 9, 1983
- Guy Fougier: June 9, 1983 – July 17, 1986
- Jean Paolini: July 17, 1986 – August 16, 1988
- Pierre Verbrugghe: August 16, 1988 – April 30, 1993
- Philippe Massoni: April 30, 1993 – April 9, 2001
- Jean-Paul Proust: April 9, 2001 – December 6, 2004
- Pierre Mutz: December 6, 2004 – June 11, 2007
- Michel Gaudin: June 11, 2007 – May 2012
- Bernard Boucault: May 2012 – July 2015
- Michel Cadot: July 2015 – April 2017
- Michel Delpuech: April 2017 – March 2019
- Didier Lallement: March 2019 – July 2022
- Laurent Nuñez: since July 2022

Sources: La Grande Encyclopédie, volume 27, page 95, published in 1900. See scan of the full text at Gallica: . / List of Prefects of Paris on rulers.org: . / Archives of Le Monde: .

== See also ==
- Caserne de la Cité, seat of the Police Prefecture since 1871
- Law enforcement in France
- Minister of the Interior (France)
- National Police (France)
- Department of Public Safety
