= Jean Paolini =

French civil servant (1921–2015)

- Born: Jean Dominique Paolini; March 3, 1921; Ghisonaccia
- Died: January 8, 2015 (aged 93); Ghisonaccia
- Education: Faculty of Law of Toulouse
- Occupations: Official, prefect
- Years active: 1944 – 1988
- Awards: Grand Officer of the Legion of Honour; Ordre national du Mérite; Croix de Guerre 1939–1945

Signature
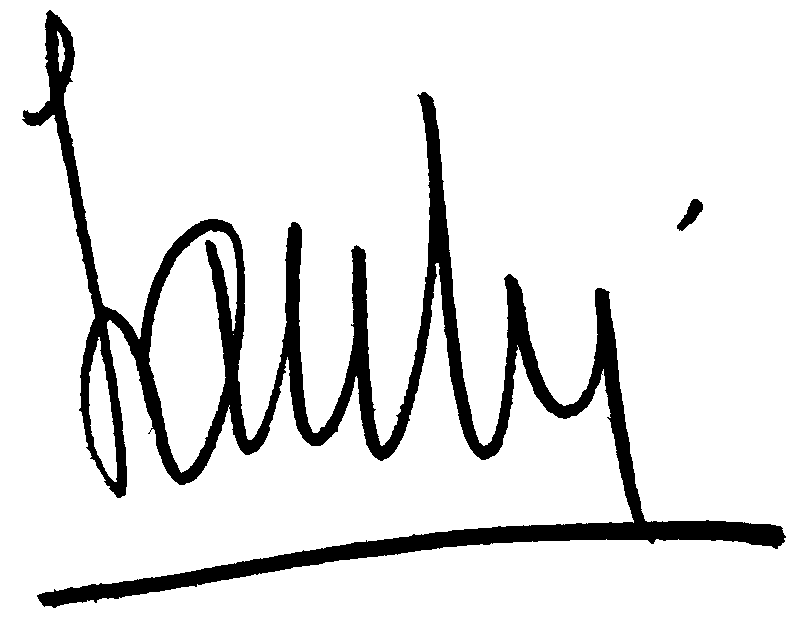

Jean Paolini (3 March 1921 – 8 January 2015) was a French civil servant. He was prefect of the Meuse and prefect of police of Paris.

== Biography ==
Jean Dominique Paolini was born on 3 March 1921 in Ghisonaccia, Haute-Corse, Corsica, to a father who was a technical assistant in the public works department of the State. He studied at the Lycée de Bastia, then at the Faculty of Law of Toulouse Capitole University, where he obtained a law degree.

He enlisted as a volunteer in January 1943 and became chief of staff to the secretary general for the police of the Toulouse region in August 1944. He was then appointed chief of staff to Poggioli, prefect of the Hautes-Pyrénées, then of Loir-et-Cher (1945-1947). Sub-prefect of the 3rd class, he was chief of staff to the prefect of the Rhône, then secretary general of Savoie in 1951, Charente in 1958, and Meurthe-et-Moselle in 1959. He was appointed prefect of the Meuse in 1965.

In 1967, he became chief of staff to the prefect of police Maurice Grimaud, before himself becoming prefect of the Paris police in 1973. He was chief of staff to the Minister of the Interior Michel Poniatowski (1976) and then to Christian Bonnet (1977).

During the First Cohabitation, the prefect of police of Paris, Guy Fougier, resigned because of tensions with the Minister of the Interior, Charles Pasqua. Prime Minister Jacques Chirac proposed the appointment of Jean Paolini, who had already been prefect of police in 1973. The Élysée refused, but the Prime Minister reacted with the utmost firmness by threatening to make Paolini a chargé de mission in the cabinet of minister Robert Pandraud, who had all the powers that would allow him to head the police prefecture. Mitterrand relented and appointed Paolini prefect of police in Paris in 1986.

He retired in 1988.

He received the distinctions of Grand Officer of the Legion of Honour and Grand Cross of the Ordre national du Mérite.
