= Verberie =

- Commune
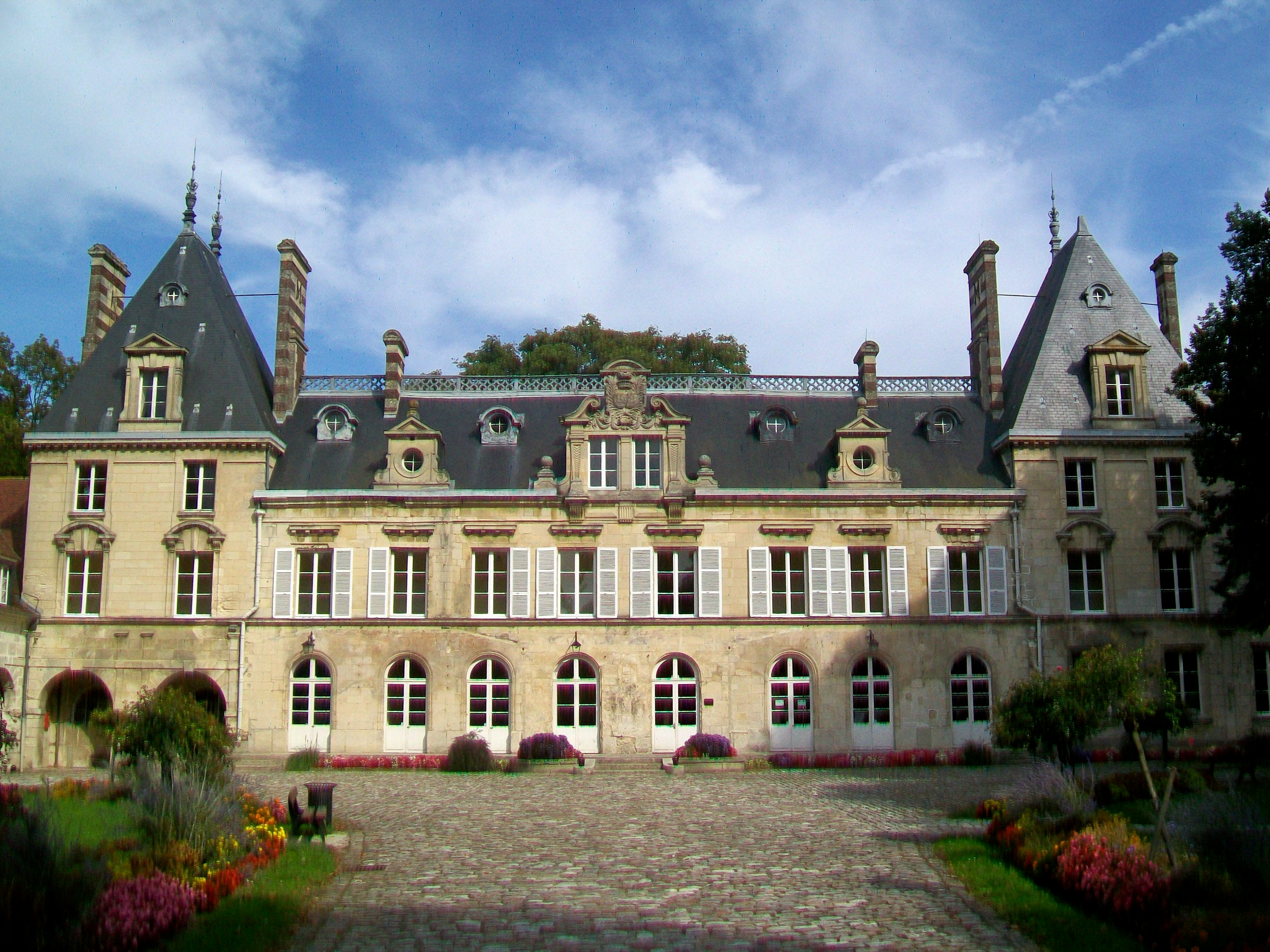
- The chateau of Aramont, in Verberie

- Coat of arms
- Location of Verberie
- Location within France Location within Hauts-de-France
- Coordinates: 49°18′40″N 2°43′56″E
- Country: France
- Region: Hauts-de-France
- Department: Oise
- Arrondissement: Senlis
- Canton: Crépy-en-Valois
- Intercommunality: CA Région de Compiègne et Basse Automne

Government
  - Mayor (2025–2026): Cécile Davidovics
- Area^{1}: 15.05 km^{2} (5.81 sq mi)
- Elevation: 33 m (108 ft)
- Highest elevation: 125 m (410 ft)
- Lowest elevation: 30 m (98 ft)
- Population (2023): 3,898
  - Density: 259.0/km^{2} (670.8/sq mi)
- Time zone: UTC+01:00 (CET)
  - Summer (DST): UTC+02:00 (CEST)
- INSEE/Postal code: 60667 /60410
- ^{1} French Land Register data, which excludes lakes, ponds, glaciers > 1 km^{2} (0.386 sq mi or 247 acres) and river estuaries.

Verberie (French pronunciation: [vɛʁbəʁi]) is a commune in the Oise department in northern France.

It lies 7 miles (11 km) southwest of Compiègne on the main road to Senlis and Paris. The railway station is on the line from Compiègne to Crépy-en-Valois.

== History ==
Verberie was the site of an Iron Age aristocratic Gallic farm, during the La Tène period.

On 1 October 856 Judith, the daughter of Charles the Bald, King of West Francia, married Æthelwulf, King of Wessex at the royal palace of Verberie.

During the First World War it was the scene of fighting on 1 September 1914, and in 1918. The village has several war cemeteries including the Verberie French National Cemetery which contains the graves of 3,221 French soldiers (of whom 2,339 are unidentified), 52 servicemen from the United Kingdom, and one Canadian cavalryman.

== Population ==
Historical population
Year	Pop.	±% p.a.
1968	2,511	—
1975	2,512	+0.01%
1982	2,293	−1.29%
1990	2,627	+1.71%
1999	3,283	+2.51%
2007	3,466	+0.68%
2012	4,062	+3.22%
2017	3,848	−1.08%
2023	3,898	+0.22%
Source: INSEE

The inhabitants are known as Sautriauts in French.

== Personalities ==
It was the birthplace of author and feminist Juliette Adam.

== Gallery ==
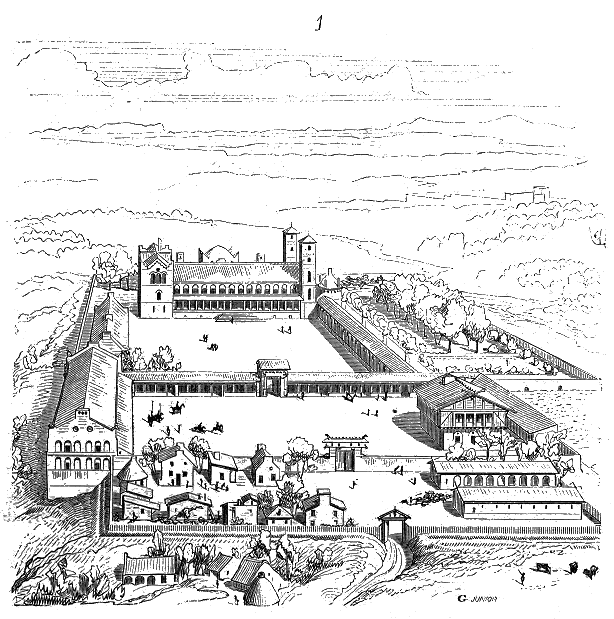
Palais carolingien

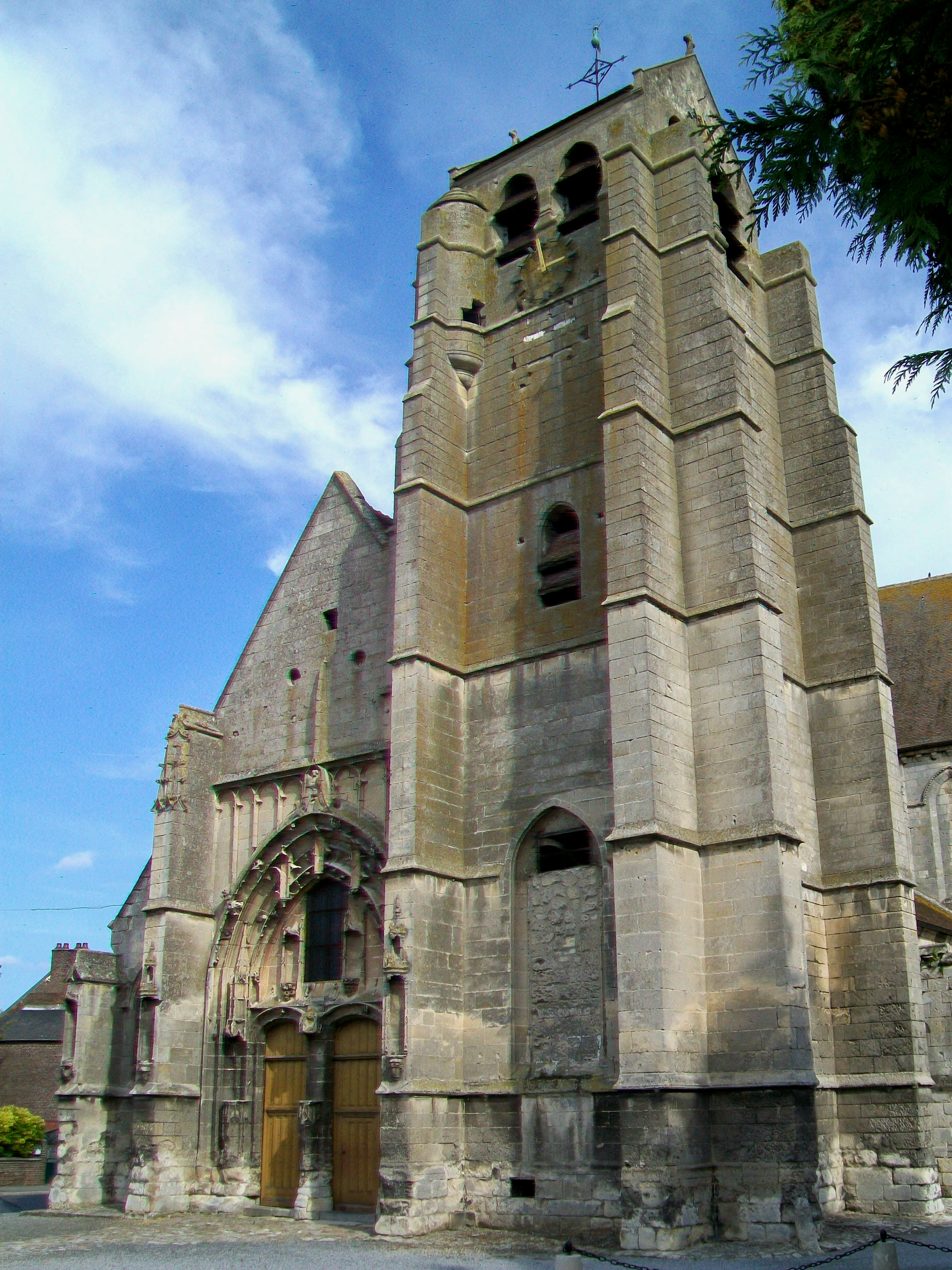
Saint-Pierre-et-Saint-Paul church

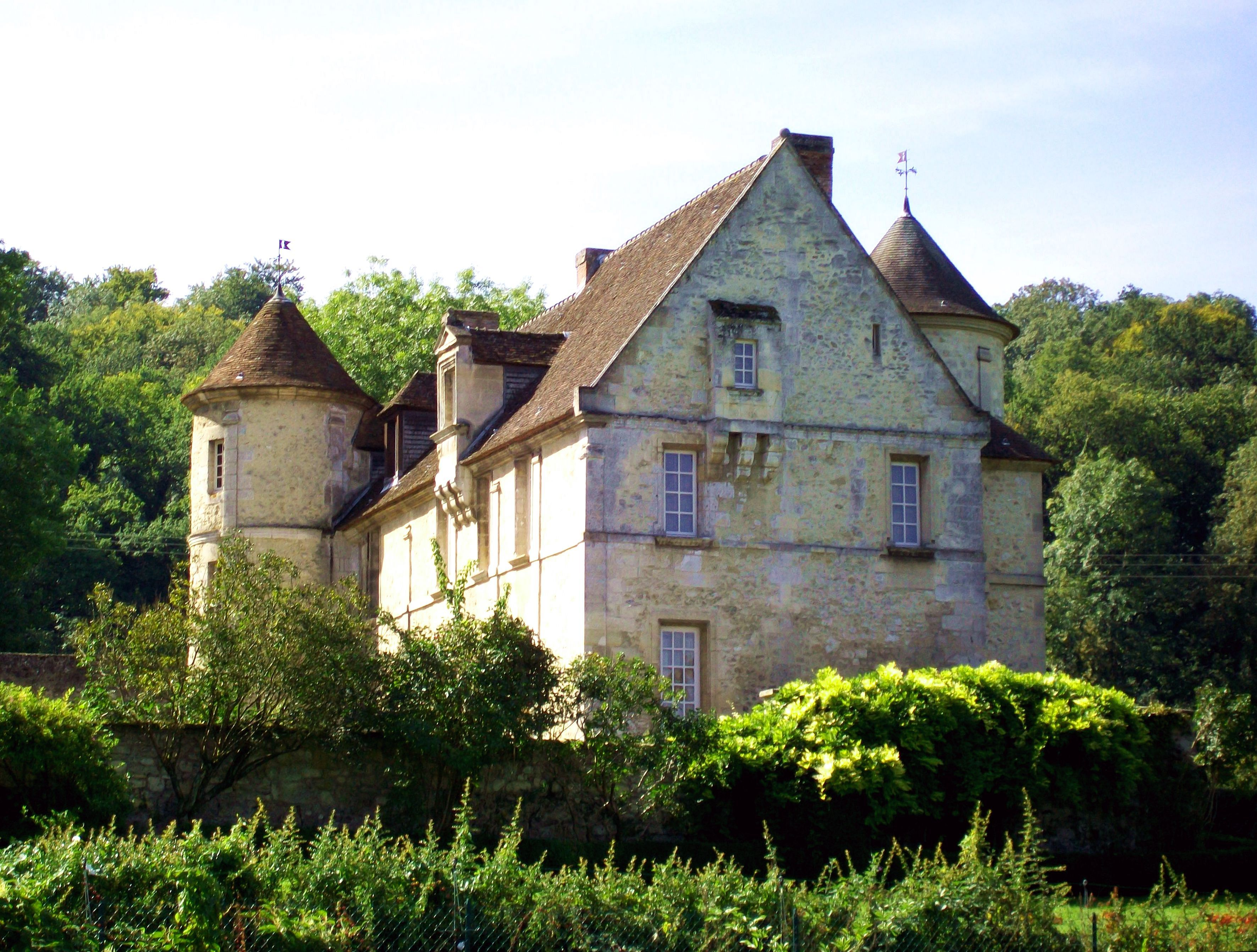
Saint-Germain Manor

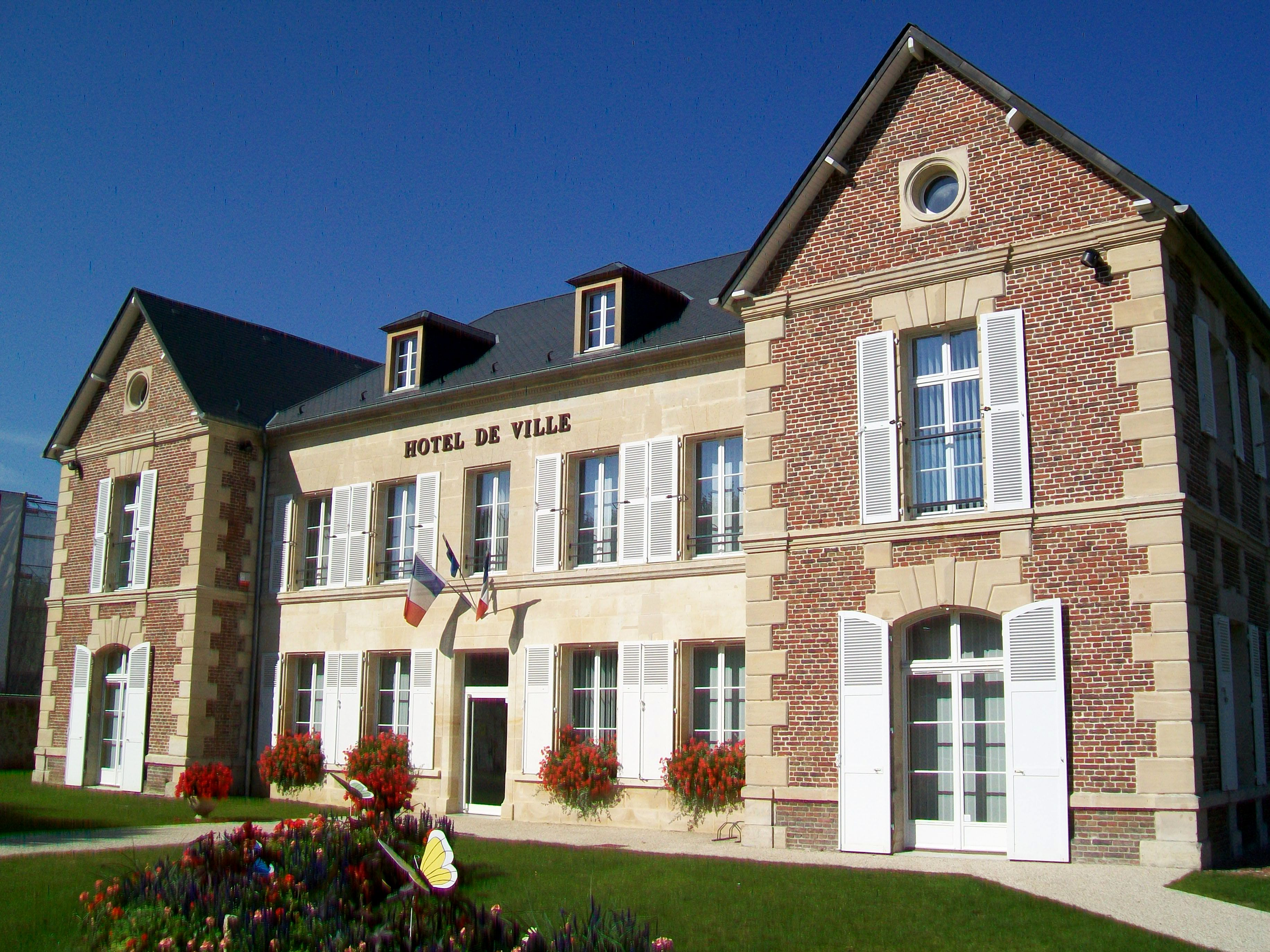
Town hall

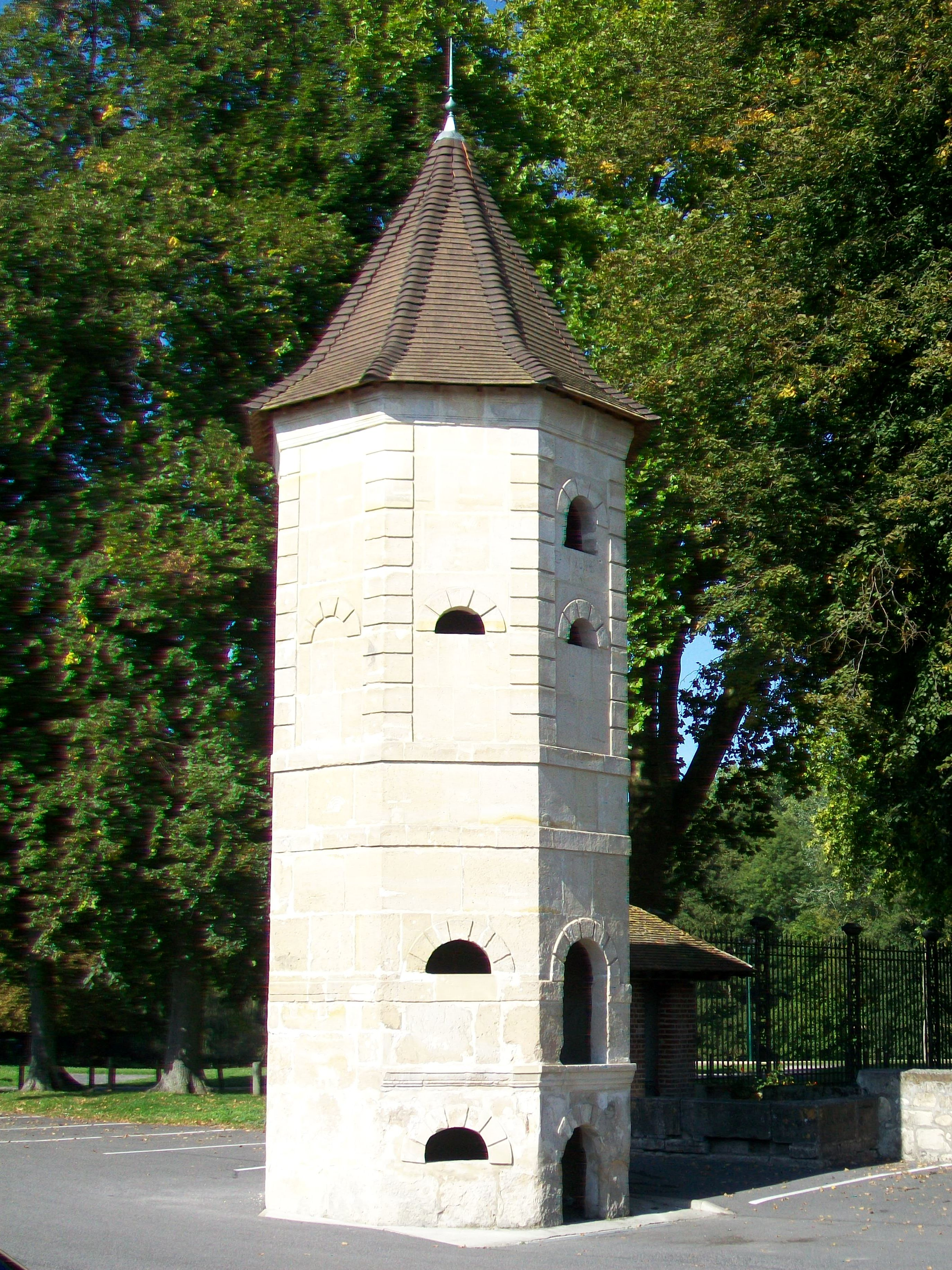
château d'Aramont

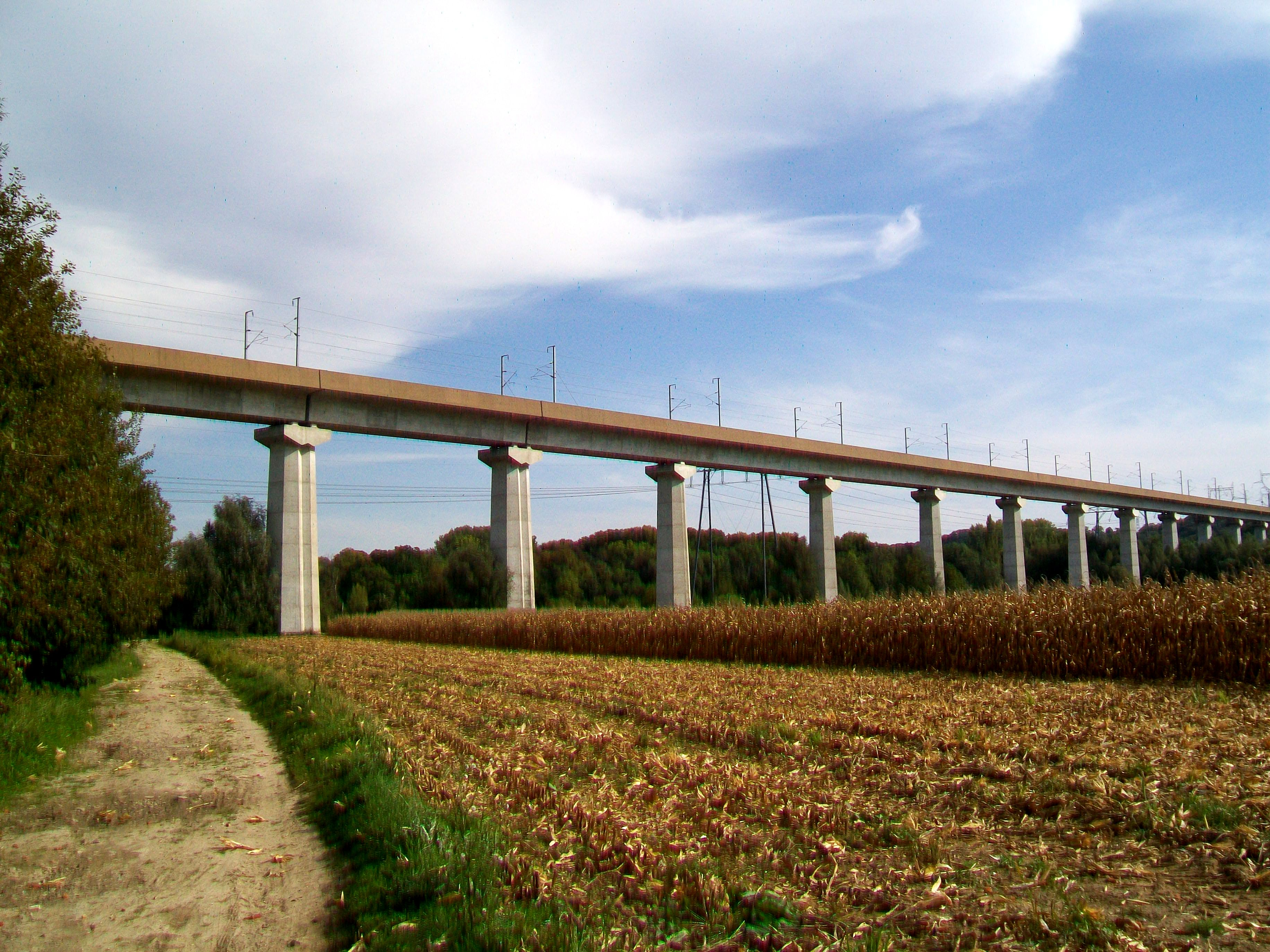
LGV Nord viaduct

=== Iron Age Gallic farm ===
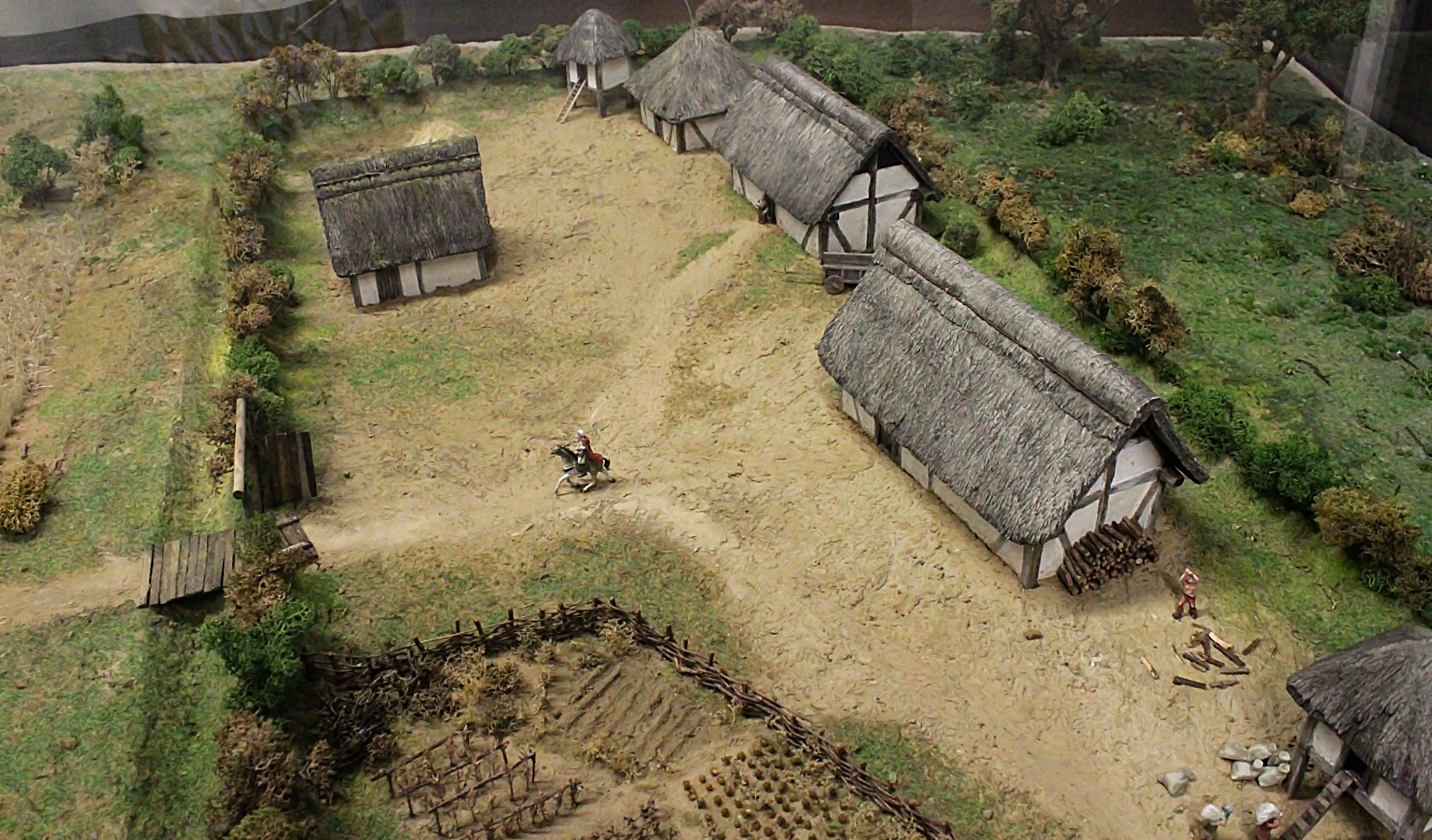
Iron Age Gallic farm model

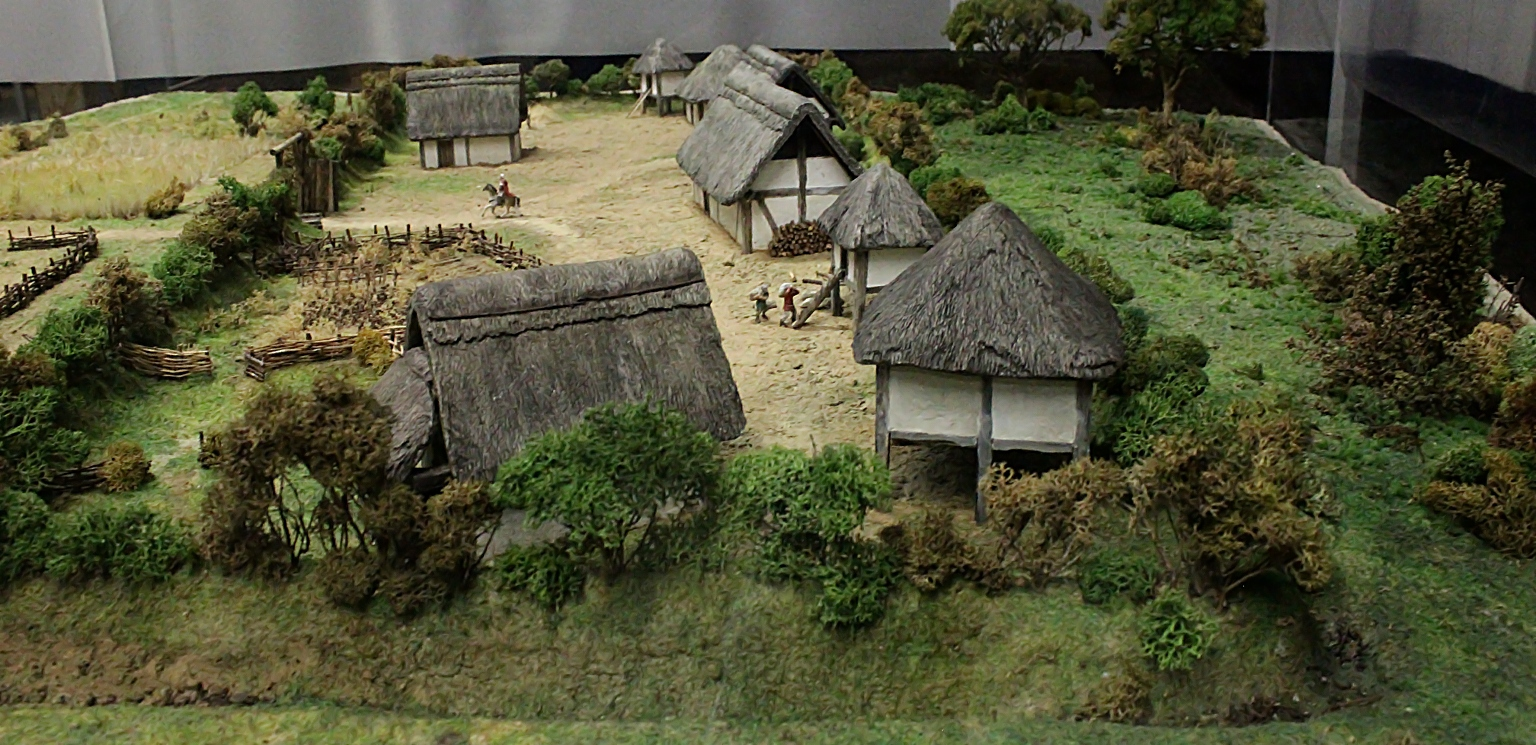

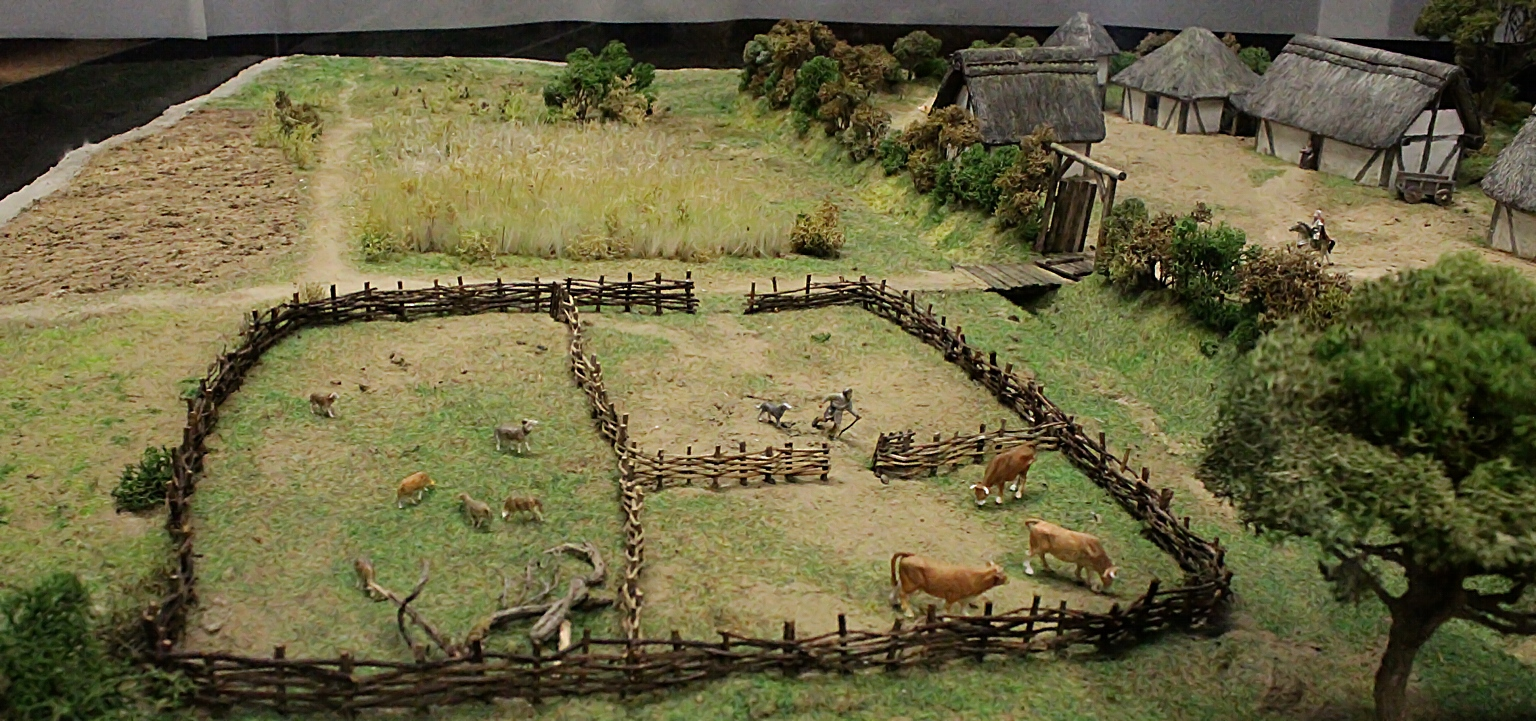

== See also ==
- Communes of the Oise department
- Château d'Aramont
