= Émile Marie Laurent =

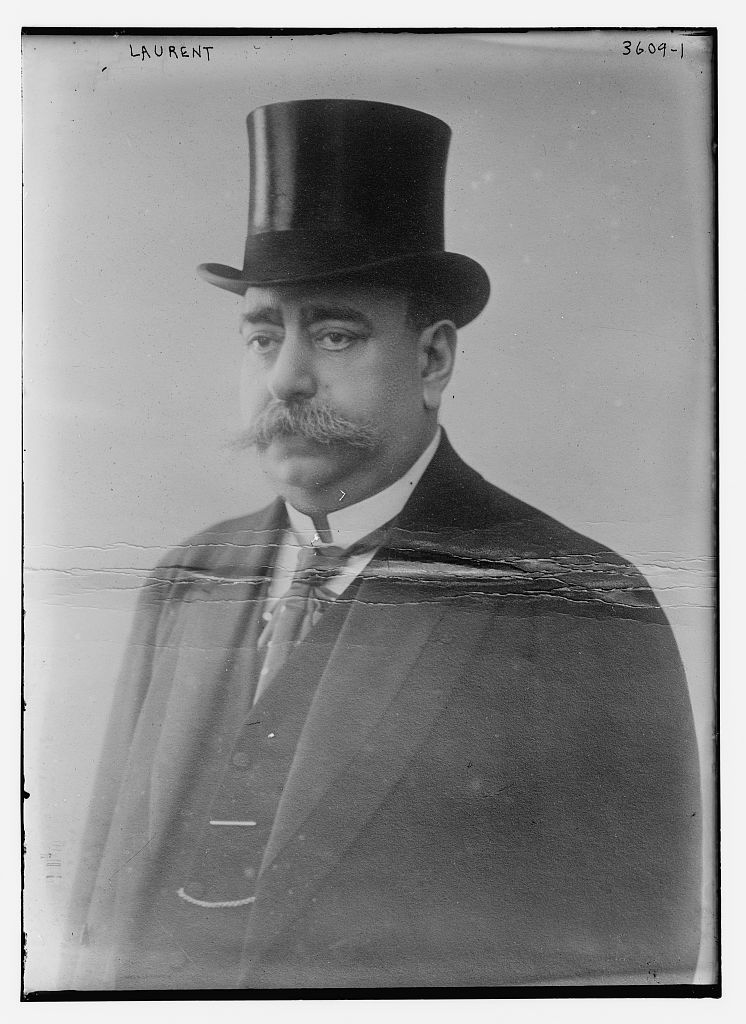
- Laurent circa 1917

Prefect of Police of Paris
- In office September 3, 1914 – June 3, 1917
- Preceded by: Célestin Hennion
- Succeeded by: Louis Hudelo

Personal details
- Born: October 1, 1852
- Died: October 1, 1930 (aged 78)

Emile Marie Laurent (October 1, 1852 - October 1930), was the Prefect of Police of Paris from September 1914 to June 1917.

== Biography ==
He was born on October 1, 1852, in Brest, France and served in the military from 25 October 1875 to 5 October 1877. He was appointed as the Prefect of Police of Paris on September 2, 1914 and retired on June 5, 1917. He died in October 1930 in Paris.
