= Maurice Papon =

French policeman, politician, and Axis collaborator (1910–2007)

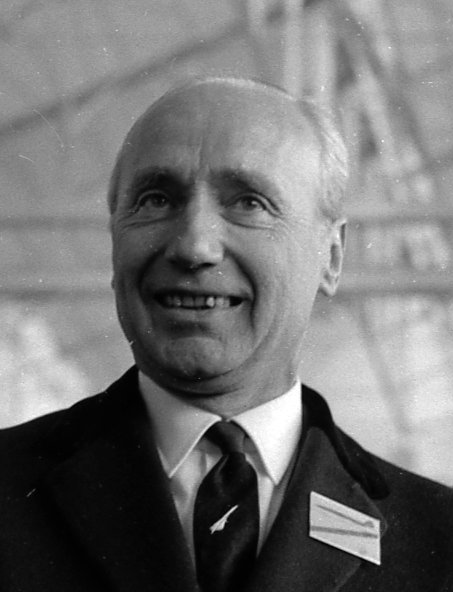
- Papon in 1967

Minister of the Budget
- In office 6 April 1978 – 13 May 1981
- President: Valéry Giscard d'Estaing
- Prime Minister: Raymond Barre
- Preceded by: Pierre Bernard-Reymond
- Succeeded by: Laurent Fabius

Deputy for Cher's 3rd constituency
- In office 11 July 1968 – 6 May 1978
- Preceded by: Laurent Bilbeau
- Succeeded by: Berthe Fiévet

Prefect of Police of Paris
- In office 15 March 1958 – 18 January 1967
- Preceded by: André Lahillonne
- Succeeded by: Maurice Grimaud

Mayor of Saint-Amand-Montrond
- In office 1971–1983
- Preceded by: Robert Lazurick
- Succeeded by: Serge Vinçon

Mayor of Gretz-Armainvilliers
- In office 1955–1958
- Preceded by: Georges Travers
- Succeeded by: Anatole Gaucherot

Personal details
- Born: 3 September 1910 Gretz-Armainvilliers, Seine-et-Marne, France
- Died: 17 February 2007 (aged 96) Pontault-Combault, Seine-et-Marne, France
- Party: Union of Democrats for the Republic; Rally for the Republic
- Occupation: Civil servant
- Criminal information
- Status: Deceased
- Conviction: Crimes against humanity
- Penalty: 10 years imprisonment

Details
- Imprisoned at: La Santé Prison

Maurice Papon (French: [mɔʁis papɔ̃, moʁ-]; 3 September 1910 – 17 February 2007) was a French civil servant, mass murderer and Nazi collaborator who was convicted of crimes against humanity committed during the occupation of France. Papon led the police in major prefectures from the 1930s to the 1960s, before he became a Gaullist politician. When he was secretary general for the police in Bordeaux during World War II, he participated in the deportation of more than 1,600 Jews. He is also known for his activities in the Algerian War (1954–1962), during which he tortured insurgent prisoners as prefect of the Constantinois department, and ordered, as prefect of the Paris police, the 1961 Paris massacre of pro-National Liberation Front (FLN) demonstrators for violating a curfew that he had "advised".

In 1961, Maurice Papon was personally awarded the Legion of Honour by French President Charles de Gaulle, whose government had been struggling with the FLN insurgency. Papon also commanded the Paris police in the Charonne subway massacre and the 1961 Paris massacre, during which between 200 and 300 Algerian demonstrators were deliberately killed by the Paris police. Forced to resign in 1967 after the suspicious forced disappearance of the Moroccan Marxist Mehdi Ben Barka, with de Gaulle's support he was named as president of Sud Aviation, the company which co-developed Concorde.

After May 1968, Papon was elected as a member of the French National Assembly and served several terms. From 1978 to 1981, he served in the cabinet of Prime Minister Raymond Barre under President Valéry Giscard d'Estaing. Between the two rounds of the May 1981 presidential election, where Giscard d'Estaing was running for a second term, details about Papon's past were leaked in Le Canard enchaîné newspaper. Documents signed by Papon were made public that showed his responsibility in the deportation of 1,690 Bordeaux Jews to Drancy internment camp from 1942–44. After a long investigation and protracted legal wranglings, he was eventually tried.

In 1998, Papon was convicted of crimes against humanity. He was released from prison early, in 2002, for ill health. He died in 2007.

== Early life and education ==
Papon was born in Gretz-Armainvilliers, Seine-et-Marne, the son of a solicitor who became an industrialist. In 1919, when Papon was nine years old, his father was elected mayor in the commune and held that office until 1937. His father was also local representative (conseiller général) of Tournan-en-Brie and president of the canton's council in 1937.

Papon studied at the Lycée Louis-le-Grand, in Paris. Fellow students at the elite school were Georges Pompidou, later President of France, and René Brouillet, who would join Charles de Gaulle's cabinet after the war. Papon entered Sciences-Po, the specialty university for future civil servants and politicians, and he studied law, psychology and sociology.

== Early career ==
After entering public service at the age of 20, Papon was quickly promoted. During the second Cartel des gauches, in February 1931, he worked in the cabinet of the Minister of Air, Jacques-Louis Dumesnil. He was named in the Ministry of Interior in July 1935 before he became chief of staff of the deputy director of departmental and communal affairs, in January 1936, under Maurice Sabatier.

In June 1936, during the Popular Front government, he was attached to the cabinet of Radical-Socialist François de Tessan, the vice-state secretary to the presidency of the council as well as a friend of his father. He became a member of the Ligue d'action universitaire républicaine et socialiste, a Radical-Socialist youth group; Pierre Mendès France was also a member.

== World War II ==
Mobilised on 26 August 1939 in the 2nd colonial infantry regiment, Papon was sent to Tripoli, French Lebanon. He was assigned to direct the French secret services in Ras-el-Aïn, in the north of French Syria. Following the fall of France, he was demobilized and returned to France by October 1940. Papon opted to serve the Vichy government, his mentors, Jacques-Louis Dumesnil and Maurice Sabatier, having voted on 10 July 1940 to grant all power to Philippe Pétain.

Papon was appointed as the vice-chief of bureau to the central administration of the Ministry of Interior, before he was named, in February 1941, as vice-prefect, 1st class. The next month, he became Maurice Sabatier's general secretary and general secretary of the administration for the Interior Minister. While Papon chose Vichy, 94 civil servants were dismissed at the end of the spring of 1941, 104 pensioned off and 79 moved. Now, as Le Monde put it in 2002, "neutrality is no longer an option."

In May 1942, his chief, Sabatier, was named prefect of Aquitaine by Pierre Laval, the head of the Vichy government. Papon was appointed as general secretary of the prefecture of Gironde in charge of Jewish Affairs.

Papon later claimed he had Gaullist tendencies during the war. A confidential report from the Nazis at the time shows that in April 1943, he identified himself as a "collaborationist" during "personal or official conversations." Another document from July 1943 called him a "good negotiator."

During World War II, Papon served as a senior police official in the Vichy régime. He was the second official in the Bordeaux region (the secretary-general of the prefecture of Gironde) and the supervisor of its Service for Jewish Questions. With authority over Jewish affairs, Papon regularly collaborated with Nazi Germany's SS, which was responsible for the extermination of Jews. Under his command, about 1,560 Jews were deported. Most were sent directly to the camp of Mérignac and then they were transported to Drancy internment camp, near Paris, and finally to Auschwitz or other concentration camps for extermination.

From July 1942 to August 1944, 12 trains left Bordeaux for Drancy; about 1,600 Jews, including 130 children under 13, were deported; few survived. Papon also implemented the antisemitic laws voted by the Vichy government. By July 1942, he had "dejudaised" 204 companies, sold 64 land properties owned by Jewish people and was in the process of "dejudaising" 493 other businesses.

== Rehabilitation under the Fourth Republic ==
Some résistants questioned his activities, but Papon avoided being judged by the Comité départemental de libération (CDL) of Bordeaux for his role during Vichy, as he was protected by Gaston Cusin. He presented a certificate attesting that he had taken part in the Resistance, although its authenticity was later rejected.

The CDL were in charge of the épuration, the pursuit of collaborators. During the Liberation of France, the Resistance in Bordeaux was very weak. It lacked members because of internal dissensions and German repression. Maurice Sabatier, Papon's mentor and chief, was accused by the CDL of having "boasted" that his prefecture was one of the most efficient concerning the "percentage" of "deportations." He was sentenced only to a suspension of several months during which he was paid half his salary. In 1948, he was awarded the Legion of Honour for general wartime service.

Papon became chief of staff of the commissaire de la République, a high civil servant that replaced Vichy's prefects. He effectively retained the same functions as during the war. Charles de Gaulle and others "perfectly knew his past," according to Olivier Guichard. De Gaulle had received him personally after the liberation of Bordeaux in September 1944.

Papon was first named prefect of the Landes department in August 1944 and then chief of staff of the commissaire of the Republic of Aquitaine, under Gaston Cusin. When Cusin left Bordeaux, his successor, Jacques Soustelle, a Gaullist Résistant, confirmed Papon into his functions. A few months later, Maurice Bourgès-Maunoury also confirmed him there.

In October 1945, Papon was appointed as vice-director of Algeria at the Minister of Interior. A year later, he became secretary of state to the Ministry of Interior Jean Biondi of the socialist French Section of the Workers' International (SFIO). Eric Roussel, a De Gaulle biographer, wrote that to the general and president, who was concerned with the survival of the Republic against undemocratic movements:

"the authority of the state is so sacred, the danger constituted by the communists so intolerable, that he is disposed to accept without too many problems of conscience men who may have, for a fairly long time, worked on behalf of Vichy."

Papon was named prefect of Corsica in January 1947 by Léon Blum's government and, in October 1949, prefect of Constantine in Algeria by Radical Henri Queuille's government (with SFIO member Jules Moch at the Interior). He went to Morocco in 1954 as general secretary of the protectorate, where he helped repress Moroccan nationalists. He returned to Constantine in 1956 during the Algerian War (1954–1962), where he actively participated in the repression, including the use of torture against the civilian population.

== Prefect of Police of Paris ==
In March 1958, Papon was appointed Prefect of Police for Paris by the government of Radical Félix Gaillard.

=== May 1958 crisis ===
Papon thus had an important role in the May 1958 crisis, which brought de Gaulle to power and led to the founding of the Fifth Republic. He took part in the secret Gaullist meetings that assured the use of the crisis to prepare de Gaulle's nomination as President of the council and to grant him special powers. On 3 July 1958, he managed to get what, according to Le Monde, he could "never have dreamed of" a Carte d'Ancien Combattant de la Resistance. On 12 July 1961, President de Gaulle bestowed on him the French Legion of Honour for service to the state.

=== October 1961 massacre ===
Papon oversaw the repression during the 1961 Paris massacre: on 17 October 1961, a large peaceful march, organised by the Algerian National Liberation Front, broke a curfew that had been "advised" by Papon because of ostensible concerns about the group's sponsoring of a series of bombings throughout France. The police arrested 11,000 persons, who claimed that it was simply because of their appearance.

They were mostly people from the Maghreb but also included Spanish, Portuguese and Italians. They were sent, in a tragic echo of the Vichy regime, on public buses to the Parc des Expositions, the Vélodrome d'Hiver and other such centres that had been used under Vichy as internment centers. A massacre occurred in the courtyards of the Prefecture of Police, and the detainees were held without specific charges. In the following days at the Parc des Expositions, detainees were subject to inhumane treatments. Arrests continued throughout October 1961. Meanwhile, bodies were found floating in the river Seine.

Up to 200 people were killed during the events, according to a prominent historian, Jean-Luc Einaudi. Because some archives have been destroyed and others remain classified, the exact number of the dead remains unknown. At the time, the French government, headed by de Gaulle, with Roger Frey as Interior Minister, admitted only two of the dead. A government inquiry in 1999 concluded 48 drownings on the one night and 142 similar deaths of Algerians in the weeks before and after, 110 of whom were found in the Seine. It also concluded the true toll was almost certainly higher. According to Le Monde, Papon "organized the silence." It was only in the 1990s that historians began to speak out. The French government reluctantly recognized 48 deaths, but the Paris Archives, consulted by historian David Assouline, note 70 persons dead. Papon never acknowledged responsibility for that massacre.

=== February 1962 massacre ===
Papon was also in charge during the 8 February 1962 demonstration against the OAS's violent campaign for "French Algeria." Organised by the French Communist Party (PCF), the demonstration had been banned by the state. Nine members of the Confédération Générale du Travail (CGT) trade union, most of them communists, were killed at Charonne métro station by the police, directed by Papon under the same government. The funerals on 13 February 1962 of the nine individuals killed (one being Fanny Dewerpe) were attended by hundreds of thousands of people.

On 8 February 2007, the Place du 8 Février 1962, a square near the metro station, was dedicated by Bertrand Delanoë, the mayor of Paris.

=== Ben Barka affair ===
Papon was forced to leave his functions after the October 1965 kidnapping, in Paris, of Mehdi Ben Barka, a Moroccan dissident and leader of the Tricontinental Conference, in October 1965. Two French police agents and French secret agents participated in the forced disappearance that was at least ordered by Moroccan Interior Minister Mohamed Oufkir. It is still an unsolved case, involving various international intelligence agencies.

De Gaulle was forced to ask for Papon's resignation in early 1967; Papon's successor was Maurice Grimaud.

== Company president and government minister ==
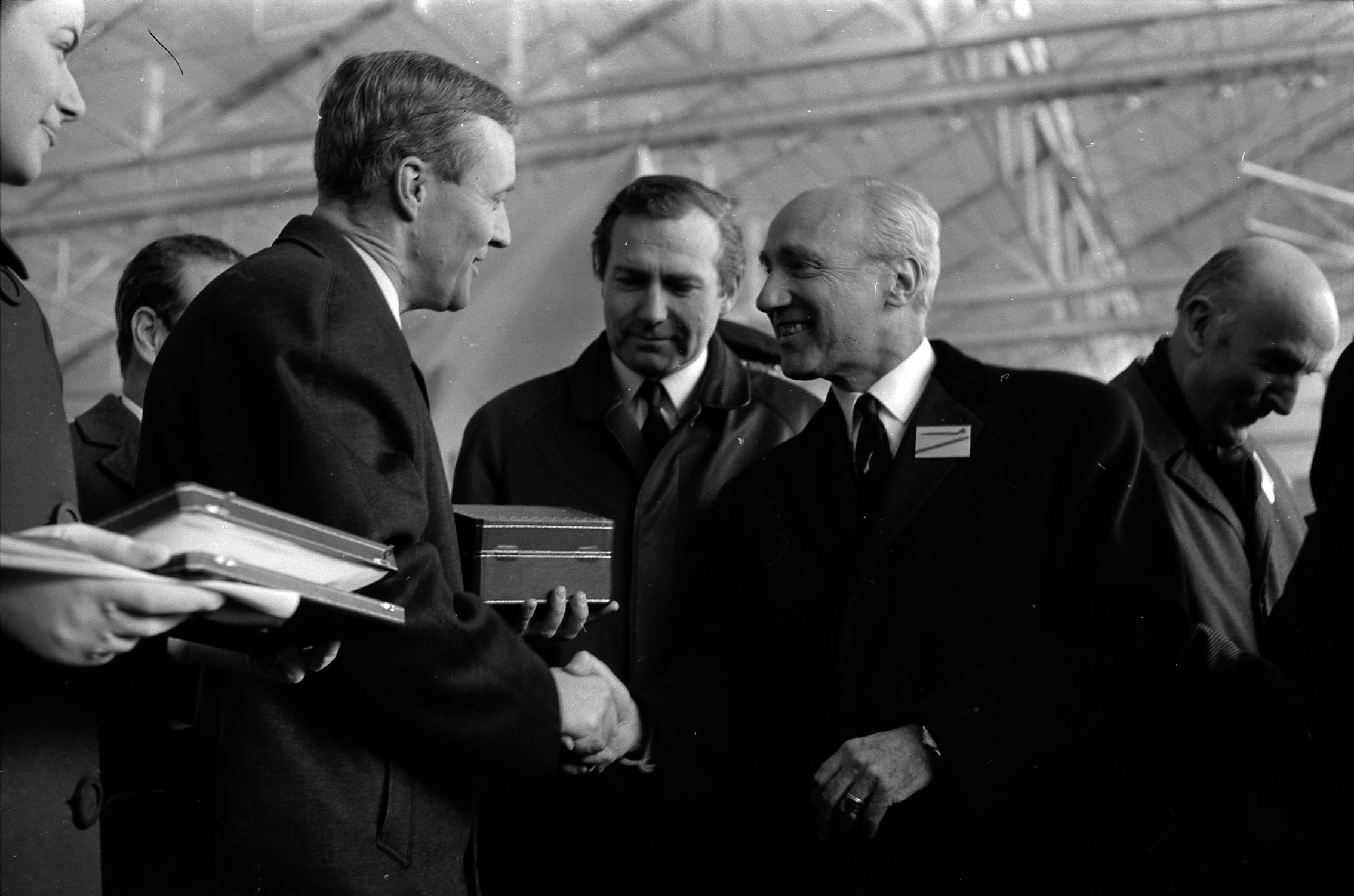
Maurice Papon shaking Tony Benn's hand during the presentation of the Concorde.

De Gaulle helped Papon become president of the company Sud Aviation (1967–1968). The firm, which later merged into Aérospatiale, built the first Concorde plane in 1969. During May 1968, he wrote: "Is it the return of the Occupation? The young German anarchist [Daniel] Cohn-Bendit is freely arranging the riots." The new chief of the Paris police managed to take care of the situation without a single death.

Papon was elected deputy of Cher as candidate of the Gaullist Union of Democrats for the Republic (UDR) in May 1968. He was re-elected in 1973 and again in 1978, now for the neo-Gaullist Rally for the Republic (RPR). He was elected mayor of Saint-Amand-Montrond in 1971 and 1977. Papon was director of the Verreries mécaniques champenoises, a glass art firm in Reims.

On the evening of 4–5 June 1977, a commando shot at workers on strike, killing CGT trade-unionist Pierre Maître and severely injuring two others. Four of the five members of the commando, members of the Confederation Française du Travail were arrested by the police. The leader of the commando and shooter, who received a 20-year sentence, and the driver were members of the Service d'Action Civique.

From 1968 to 1971, Papon was treasurer of the UDR. He became President of the Finance Commission of the National Assembly in 1972 and was the deputy presenting the budget (rapporteur général du budget) from 1973 to 1978. He served as Budget Minister under Prime Minister Raymond Barre and President Valéry Giscard d'Estaing from 1978 to 1981, before finishing his mayoral term in 1983 and renouncing further political activity.

== Trial, prison and release ==
Evidence of his responsibility in the Holocaust emerged in 1981 and throughout rest of the 1980s, he fought a string of legal battles.

=== The Canard enchaîné leaks ===
On 6 May 1981, Le Canard enchaîné newspaper published an article, "Papon, aide de camps. Quand un ministre de Giscard faisait déporter des juifs" ("Papon, aide of camps: When one of Giscard's ministers deported the Jews"). It also made public several documents that had been signed by Papon and showed his responsibility in the deportation of 1,690 Jews of Bordeaux to Drancy from 1942–44. The documents had been provided to the newspaper by one of the survivors of Papon's raid, Michel Slitinsky (1925–2012). Slitinsky had received them from historian Michel Bergés, who had discovered them in February 1981 in the department's archives. The publication of the 6 May article occurred four days before the second round of the presidential election, opposing candidate François Mitterrand, who would win the race, and incumbent president Valéry Giscard d'Estaing under whom Papon was a cabinet minister.

=== Legal battles ===
Noted Nazi hunters Serge and Beate Klarsfeld helped bring him to trial, where Serge and his son, Arno, represented the families of the victims. Other important collaborators, such as René Bousquet, head of the French police under Vichy, did not go to trial. Bousquet himself would be assassinated in 1993, shortly before his trial was to start. His adjunct, Jean Leguay, died of cancer in 1989 before he could go on trial, a decade after he had been indicted for crimes against humanity for his role in the Vel' d'Hiv Roundup in July 1942. In 1995, President Chirac recognized the French state's complicity in the roundup.

Papon had begun writing his memoirs before his death; he criticised Chirac's official recognition of the involvement of the French state in the Holocaust.

Charges of crimes against humanity, complicity of assassination and abuse of authority were first brought against Papon in January 1983. Three months later, Papon sued the families of the victims for defamation but eventually lost. The slow investigation was cancelled in 1987 because of legal technicalities (such as a mistake by the investigating magistrate). New charges were laid in 1988, in October 1990 and in June 1992. The investigation was finished in July 1995.

In December 1995, Papon was sent to the Cour d'Assises and was accused of organising four deportation trains (later increased to eight trains). The French press contrasted Papon, the Bordeaux official who was "just following orders" in the commission of murder, to Aristides de Sousa Mendes, the Portuguese Consul in Bordeaux at the time, who defied his government's orders and saved lives.

=== The trial ===
Papon finally went to trial on 8 October 1997, after 14 years of bitter legal wrangling. The trial was the longest in French history and went on until 2 April 1998. Papon was accused of ordering the arrest and deportation of 1,560 Jews, some children or elderly, between 1942 and 1944.

As in Adolf Eichmann's trial 30 years earlier, one of the issues of the trial was to determine to what extent an individual should be held culpable in a chain of responsibility. Papon's lawyers argued that he was a mid-level official, not the person making decisions about whom to deport. His lawyers argued that he had done the most good he could in the circumstances and had ensured that those to be deported were treated well while in his custody. The prosecution argued that the defence of following orders was not sufficient and that he bore at least some of the responsibility for the deportations. Calling on assistance from the best historians of the period, they dismantled his arguments of having tried to "humanise" the conditions of deportations of the Jews.

While Papon claimed that he had worked to grant humane conditions of transport to the Camp of Mérignac, historians testified that his concerns were motivated by efficiency. Although Papon claimed that he had used ordinary trains and not livestock trains, as had been used by the SNCF in numerous other transfers, the historians asserted that he was trying to prevent any demonstration of sympathy toward the Jews from the local population.

Leading historians of the period who testified as experts during the trial included Jean-Pierre Azéma, Henry Rousso, Maurice Rajsfus, René Rémond, Henri Amouroux and American historian Robert Paxton. The defence tried to exclude Paxton's testimony by claiming the international and national context was irrelevant, but the magistrate dismissed that argument and said that "crimes against humanity" necessarily imply a larger context.

Paxton, an expert in Vichy history, dismissed the "preconceived ideas" according to which Vichy had "hoped to protect French Jews" by handing "foreign Jews" over to the Germans: "From the start, at the summit, it was known that their departure [of the French Jews] was unavoidable.... Italians had protected the Jews. And the French authorities complained about it to the Germans.... The French state, itself, has participated in the politics of extermination of the Jews." In his 36-minute final speech to the jury, Papon rarely evoked those killed during the Holocaust. He portrayed himself as a victim of "the saddest chapter in French legal history." He denounced a "Moscow Trial" and compared his status to that of the Jew Alfred Dreyfus in the 19th century.

=== Verdict, appeals and escape ===
Having proved that Papon had organized eight "death trains," the plaintiffs' lawyers recommended a 20-year prison term, as opposed to life imprisonment, which is usually the norm for such crimes. Papon was convicted in 1998 as having been complicit with the Nazis in crimes against humanity. He was given a ten-year sentence but served less than three years. His lawyers filed an appeal in the Court of Cassation, but Papon fled to Switzerland under the name of Robert de La Rochefoucauld, in violation of a French law that requires one to report to prison before the beginning of the appeal hearing. He was recaptured in 1999, but was required to serve little time because of his advanced age and medical problems.

The real Robert de La Rochefoucauld, a hero of the French Resistance who maintained that Papon had worked with the Resistance, had given Papon his passport to enable him to escape. Papon's appeal, scheduled for 21 October 1999, was automatically denied by the Court because of his flight.

=== Prison and release ===
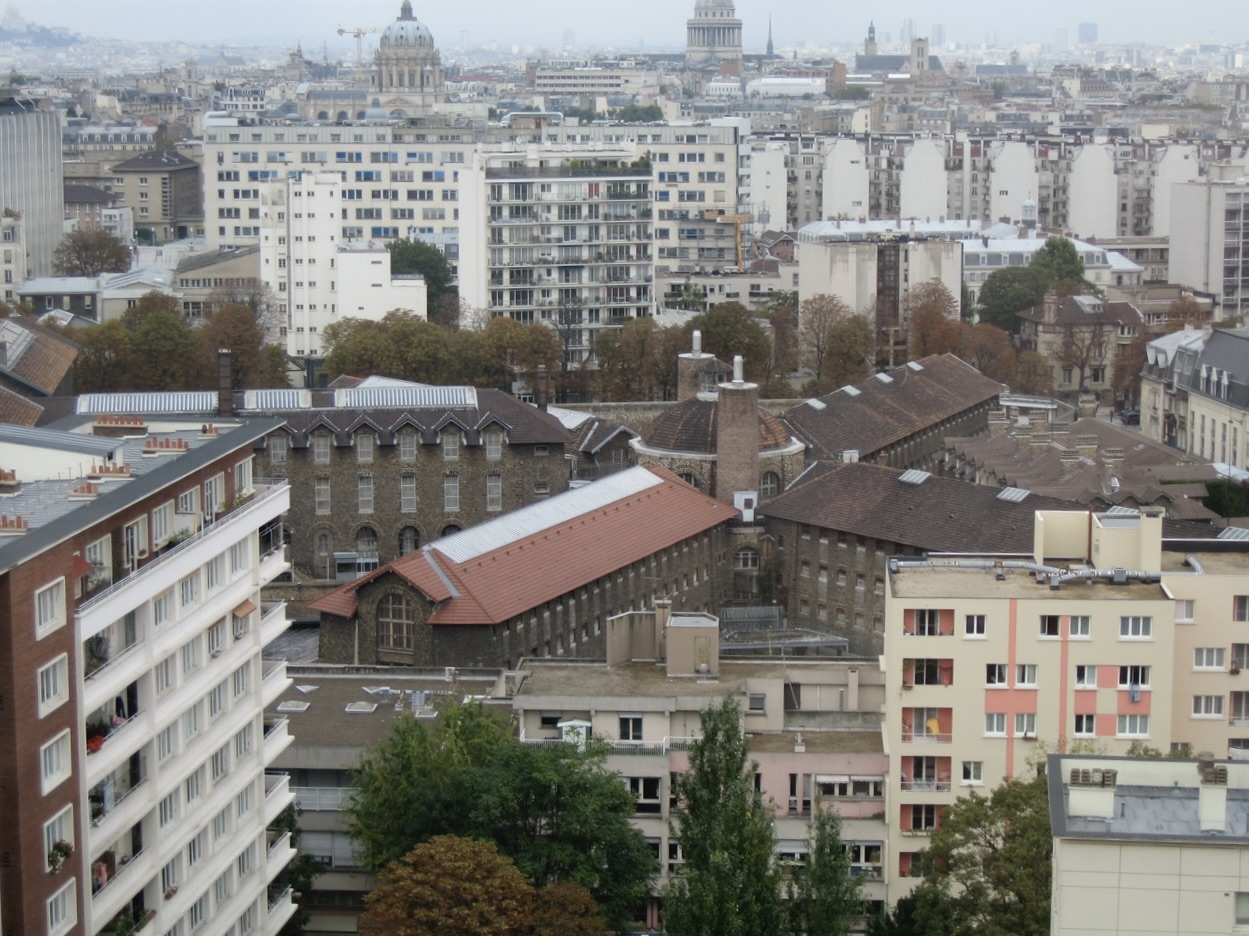
Papon was incarcerated at La Santé Prison, in Paris, in 1999.

France issued an international arrest warrant, and Papon was quickly apprehended by the Swiss police and extradited. On 22 October 1999, Papon began serving his sentence at La Santé Prison in Paris.

Papon applied for release on the grounds of poor health in March 2000, but President Jacques Chirac denied the petition three times. Papon continued to fight legal battles while he was in prison. His lawyers appealed to the European Court of Human Rights, where they argued that the French court's denial of his appeal on a technicality, rather than on the merits of the case, constituted a violation of Papon's right to appeal his conviction. The Court agreed in July 2002, admonishing the Court of Cassation and awarding Papon 429,192 French francs (about 65,400 euros) in legal costs but no damages.

Meanwhile, Papon's lawyers pursued a separate action in France and petitioned for his release under the terms of a March 2002 law, which provided for the release of ill and elderly prisoners to receive outside medical care. His doctors affirmed that Papon, now 92 years old, was essentially incapacitated. He became the second person released under the terms of the law and left jail on 18 September 2002, less than three years into his sentence. Former Justice Minister Robert Badinter expressed support for the release, prompting indignation from relatives of the victims as well as Arno and Serge Klarsfeld.

Relatives of Papon's victims and human rights nongovernmental organisations pointed out that many other detainees did not benefit from that law (including detainees in the terminal stages of AIDS as well as Nathalie Ménigon, a member of Action Directe who was still imprisoned as of 2007 despite suffering from partial hemiplegia).

The Ligue des droits de l'homme (LDH, Human Rights League) criticised the inequality before the law, as Papon was freed but not other prisoners.

== Later life and funeral ==
In March 2004, the chancery of the Legion of Honour accused Papon of illegally wearing his decoration, which had been stripped of him after his conviction, while he was being photographed for a press interview for Le Point. He was tried and fined €2,500. In February 2007, Papon had heart surgery for congestive heart failure. While the surgery was initially thought to be successful, he died a few days later on 17 February, at the age of 96.

His attorney, Francis Vuillemin, declared that Papon should be buried with insignia of Commander of the Legion of Honour. That triggered public expressions of indignation from all French political parties except Jean-Marie Le Pen's far-right National Front.

Bernard Accoyer, head of the Union for a Popular Movement group in the French National Assembly, suggested that as the high chancellor of the Order of the Legion of Honour, Chirac might personally intervene to prevent that, but Chirac did not do so. Papon was buried, with the insignia, on 21 February 2007. A son of one of Papon's victims observed of Papon, "Besides being a remorseless dead man, he also wishes to remain a vengeful one."

The German magazine Der Spiegel wrote 2007 in its obituary about Papon: “He was the epitome of the French civil servant, highly cultivated, brilliant and if necessary without any scruples".

After his death, The Irish Independent wrote in an article: 'Have no doubt Hitler would have wiped out Arabs after Jews':

Maurice Papon, lowered into his grave along with his precious Legion d'honneur last week, proved what many Arabs have long suspected but generally refuse to acknowledge: that bureaucrats and racists and others who worked for Hitler regarded all Semitic people as their enemies and that – had Hitler's armies reached the Middle East – they would ultimately have found a "final solution" to the "Arab question," just as they did for the Jews of Europe. Papon's responsibility for the 1942 arrest and deportation of 1,600 Jews in and around Bordeaux – 223 children among them, all shipped off to the Drancy camp and then to Auschwitz – was proved without the proverbial shadow of a doubt at his 1998 trial. Less clear were the exact number of Algerians murdered by his police force in Paris and hurled into the Seine in 1961.

== See also ==
- Klaus Barbie
- Paul Touvier
- René Bousquet
