= Château d'Aramont =

Coordinates: 49°18′36″N 2°43′28″E

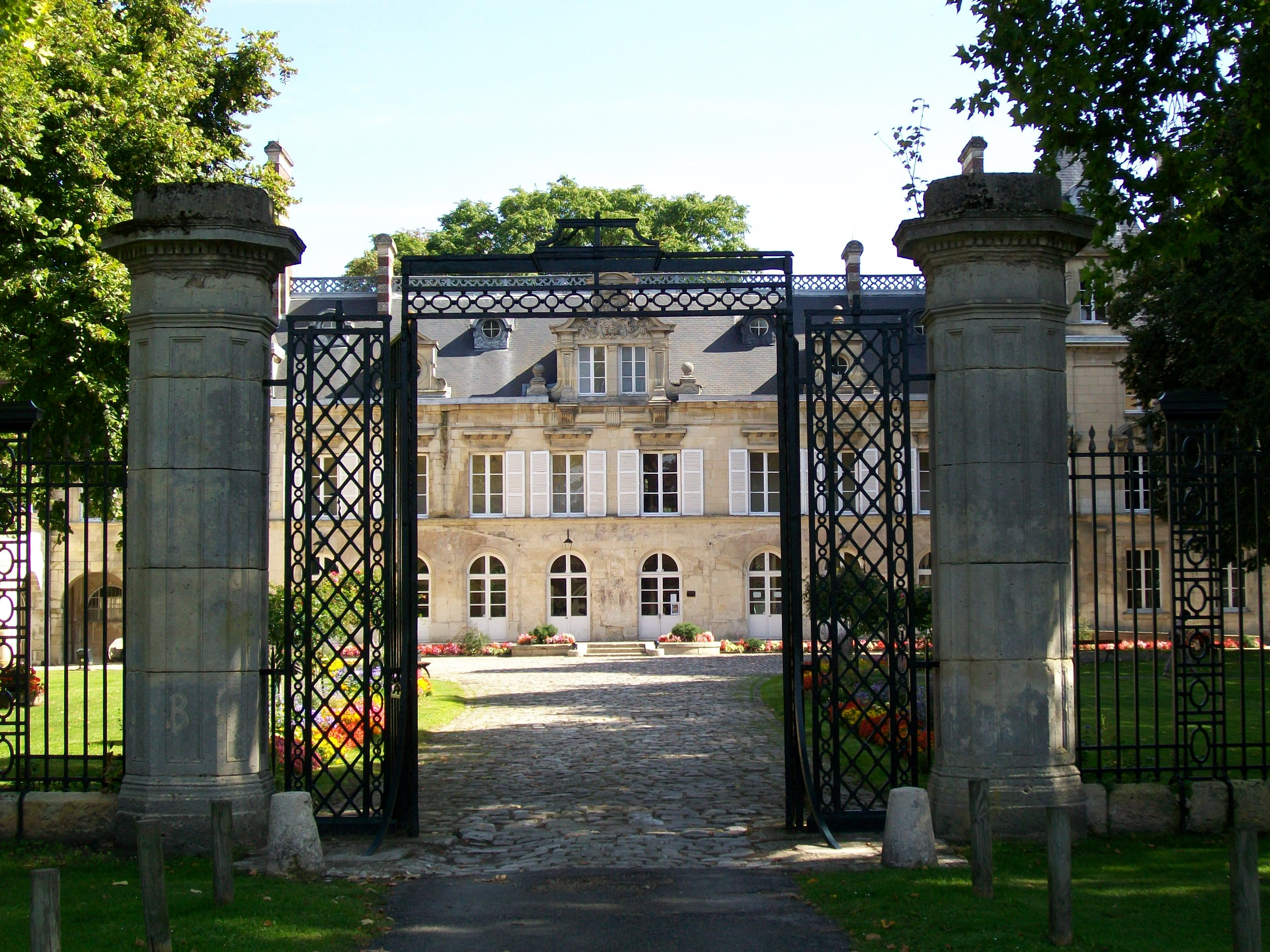

Château d'Aramont is a château in Verberie, Oise, France.
