= Edmond Adam =

French politician (1816–1877)

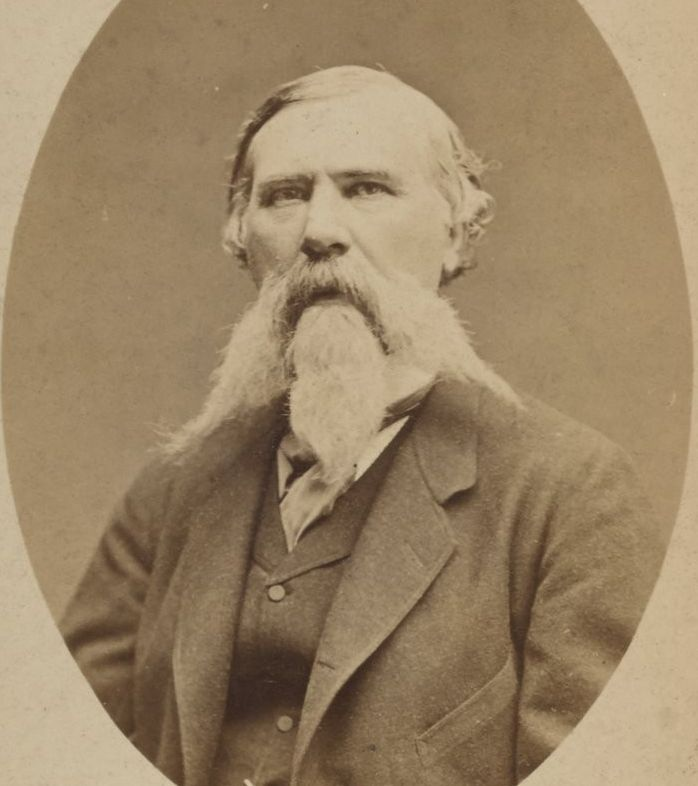
Edmond Adam

Antoine Edmond Adam (19 November 1816 – 14 June 1877) was a French politician. He was a senator for life from 1875 until his death in 1877.

His wife was Juliette Adam.
