= Amédée Girod de l'Ain =

French lawyer and politician (1781–1847)

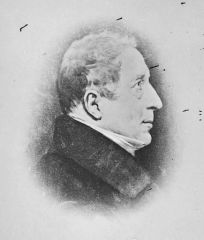
- Born: 18 October 1781; Gex, Ain, France
- Died: 27 December 1847 (aged 66); Paris, France
- Occupations: Lawyer, politician
- Known for: Minister of Public Education and Religious Affairs

Louis Gaspard Amédée, baron Girod de l'Ain (18 October 1781 – 27 December 1847) was a French lawyer and politician who became Minister of Public Education and Religious Affairs in 1832.

== Early years ==
Louis Gaspard Amédée baron Girod de l'Ain was born in Gex, Ain, on 18 October 1781. His father was Baron Jean-Louis Girod (1753-1839). His father had been appointed mayor of Gex in 1780 by Louis XVI. His mother was dame Louise-Claudine-Armande Fabry. He was the oldest of four sons.

Amédée Girod de l'Ain studied law, and pleaded his first case at the age of seventeen in the Court of Cassation. He practiced as a lawyer until 1806, when he was appointed deputy imperial prosecutor in Turin. In 1807 he became imperial prosecutor in Alexandria. In 1809 he was made Attorney General to the Court of Appeal of Lyon, and in 1810 the auditor of the Council of State. He was appointed advocate-general at the imperial court of Paris in 1811, and held this position when the First French Empire collapsed in 1814.

Girod de l'Ain was among those whose defection hastened the fall of Napoleon. He quickly recognized the House of Bourbon and was able to retain his office during the first Bourbon Restoration. However, when Napoleon returned during the Hundred Days of 1815, he accepted the position of President of the Court of First Instance of the Seine. He was elected on 14 May 1815 to represent the arrondissement of Gex in the Chamber of Deputies, and was a zealous supporter of the imperial cause. Around this time he married Mlle Sivard de Beaulieu, grandniece of the prince Lebrun, Duke of Plaisance.

== Bourbon Restoration ==
After the second Bourbon Restoration in 1815 Amédée Girod de l'Ain was excluded from the judiciary. He temporarily returned to private life. He gave asylum in his house to General Antoine Drouot, and undertook the general's defense before the council of war. On 6 April 1816 the general was acquitted by a simple majority of four votes out of seven. Girod de l'Ain was restored to the judiciary and became a counselor at the court of Paris in 1819. In that position he was a member of a commission to prepare a proposed law for jury trials. He presided in turn over the courts of Seine and of Versailles.

On 17 November 1827 Girod de l'Ain was elected Deputy for the second district of Indre-et-Loire (Chinon). He sat on the left among the constitutionalists and was active in debates. He became vice-president of the Chamber of Deputies in 1829 and supported the ministry of Jean-Baptiste de Martignac. He was reelected on 12 July 1830.

== July Monarchy ==
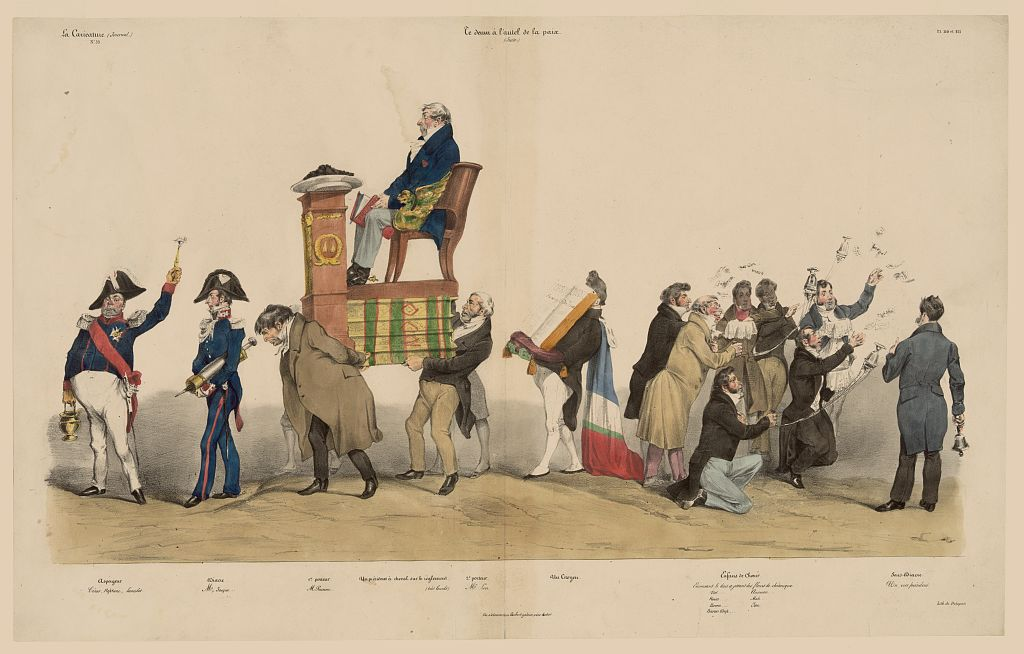
"Te Deum at the altar of peace" by Grandville. Girod de l'Ain, President of the Chamber (seated), in a procession of notables. La Caricature, November 1831

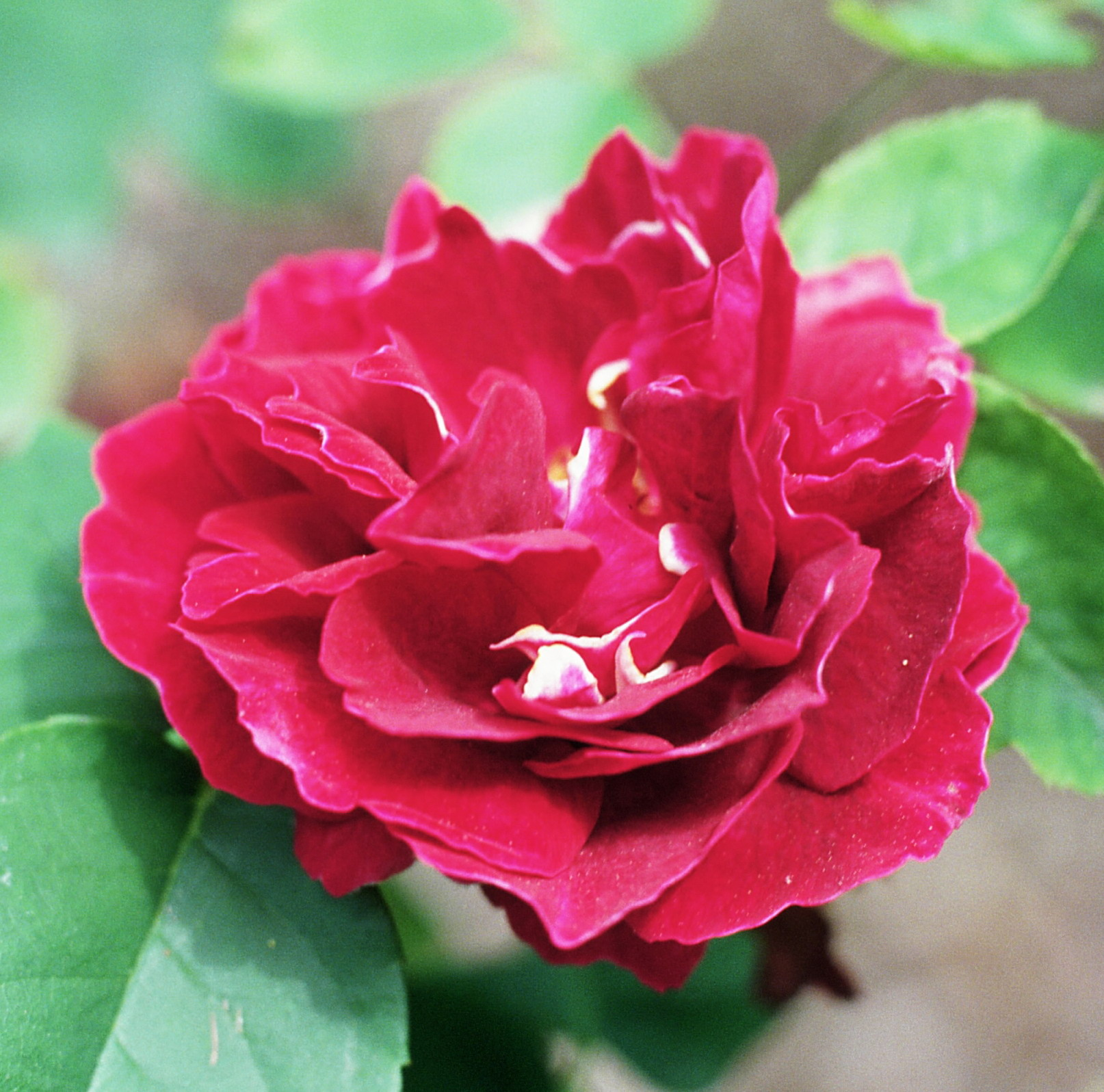
The rose cultivar "Baron Girod de l' Ain"

Amédée Girod de l'Ain was in Paris at the time of the July Revolution, and strongly supported the assumption of power by Louis Philippe I. He was made Prefect of Police on 1 August 1830. On 21 October 1830 he was reelected as a deputy. He tried to ban meetings of the Society of Friends of the People and other political associations, but was not seen as strong enough by the government and in November 1830 was replaced as head of the police by Achille Libéral Treilhard. He then joined the Council of State. He was awarded the cross of the Legion of Honor at this time.

Girod de l'Ain was reelected on 5 July 1831. On 1 August 1831 he was elected president of the Chamber of Deputies with the support of Casimir Pierre Périer. He was Minister of Public Education and Religious Affairs from 30 April 1832 to 11 October 1832. He did little while in office, and was seen as Périer's passive tool. On 11 October 1832 Girod de l'Ain was made a peer of France and was appointed President of the Council of State. He held this position until his death apart from a short interruption in May 1839 when he was Minister of Justice and Guardian of the Seals in the Interim Cabinet. He was active in the upper house, and was the author of a controversial report on the attempted insurgency of April 1834. In this he attacked the popular societies, and in particular the Société des Droits de l'Homme, and tried to show that there had been a grand conspiracy throughout France.

Amédée Girod de l'Ain died on 27 December 1847 in Paris, aged 66.

The Baron Girod de l’Ain is a hybrid perpetual rose developed by Reverchon in 1897. The fragrant blossoms are crimson edged in white.

== Works ==
- Girod de l'Ain, Amédée L. (1834). Affaire du mois d'avril 1834: Faits généraux. Imprimerie Royale.
- L'Ain, Amédée Louis Gaspard Girod de (1841). Cour Des Pairs. Attentat du 15 octobre 1840. Rapport fait à la cour par M. Le Baron Girod (de l'Ain), l'un des commissaires chargés de línstruction du procès déféré à la Cour des Pairs par ordonnance royale du 16 octobre 1840.

== Sources ==
- Eckelmeyer, Judith (2014). "Baron Girod de l'Ain". Mozart's Roses.
- "GIROD DE L'AIN (Louis Gaspard Amédée, baron)". Institut français de l’Éducation.
- Robert, Adolphe; Couchy, Gaston (1891). "GIROD DE L'AIN (Louis Gaspard Amédée)". Dictionnaire des Parlementaires Français comprenant tous les membres des Assemblées Françaises et tous les Ministres Français depuis le 1er mai 1789 jusqu'au 1er mai 1889. Bourloton.
- Pascallet, E. (1839). "GIROD DE L'AIN". Encyclopédie des gens du monde: répertoire universel des sciences, des lettres et des arts; avec des notices sur les principales familles historiques et sur les personnages célèbres, morts et vivants. Librairie de Treuttel et Würtz.
- Sarrut, Germain; Bourg, Edme Théodore (1835). "GIROD (de l'Ain) Amédée". Biographie des hommes du jour: industriels, conseillers-d'état, artistes, chambellans, députés, prêtres, militaires, écrivains, rois, diplomates, ... H. Krabe.
