= Achille Libéral Treilhard =

French lawyer and administrator

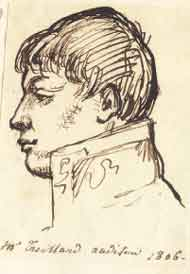
- 1806 sketch by Frédéric-Christophe d'Houdetot
- Born: 22 December 1785; Paris, France
- Died: 3 August 1855 (aged 69); Le Plessis-Pâté, France

Achille Libéral, count Treilhard (22 December 1785 - 3 August 1855) was a French lawyer and administrator. He was briefly Prefect of Police in Paris in 1830.

== Napoleonic era ==
Achille Libéral, count Treilhard was the son of Jean-Baptiste Treilhard (1742-1810), a lawyer, parliamentarian and one of the editors of the French Civil Code, and Edmée Elisabeth Boudot (died 1805). He was born in Paris on 27 December 1785.

Treilhard was appointed Auditor of the Council of State in 1806, and named secretary-general of the prefecture of the Seine on 25 February 1809. After the union of Catalonia with France he was appointed Prefect of Barcelona, and held that position when the First French Empire collapsed in 1814. On 15 July 1814 he married Paméla Marqfoy (1795-1876). They had two sons and three daughters. During the Hundred Days of 1815 when Napoleon returned from exile, Treilhard was in turn Prefect of Gers and of Haute-Garonne.

== Restoration and July Monarchy ==
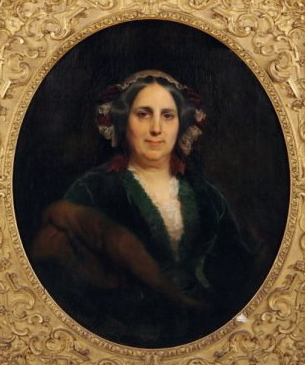
Paméla Marqfoy (1795-1876), Treilhard's wife, by Édouard Dubufe (1852)

Treilhard returned to private life after the second Bourbon Restoration in 1815. He was devoted to the constitutional party, and during the July Revolution of July 1830 presided over the meeting at Le National in which the provisional government was formed. After this he was named Prefect of Seine-Inférieure. On 7 November 1830 he was appointed Prefect of Police in Paris, holding this position during the trial of the ministers of the former king Charles X of France. He replaced Amédée Girod de l'Ain, who was not seen as forceful enough in keeping the peace.

On 26 December 1830 Treilhard was awarded the decoration of the Legion of Honor and was named councilor of the Court of Paris. He resigned in February 1831. He died in Le Plessis-Pâté on 3 August 1855 at the age of 69.
