= Juliette Adam =

French author and feminist (1836–1936)

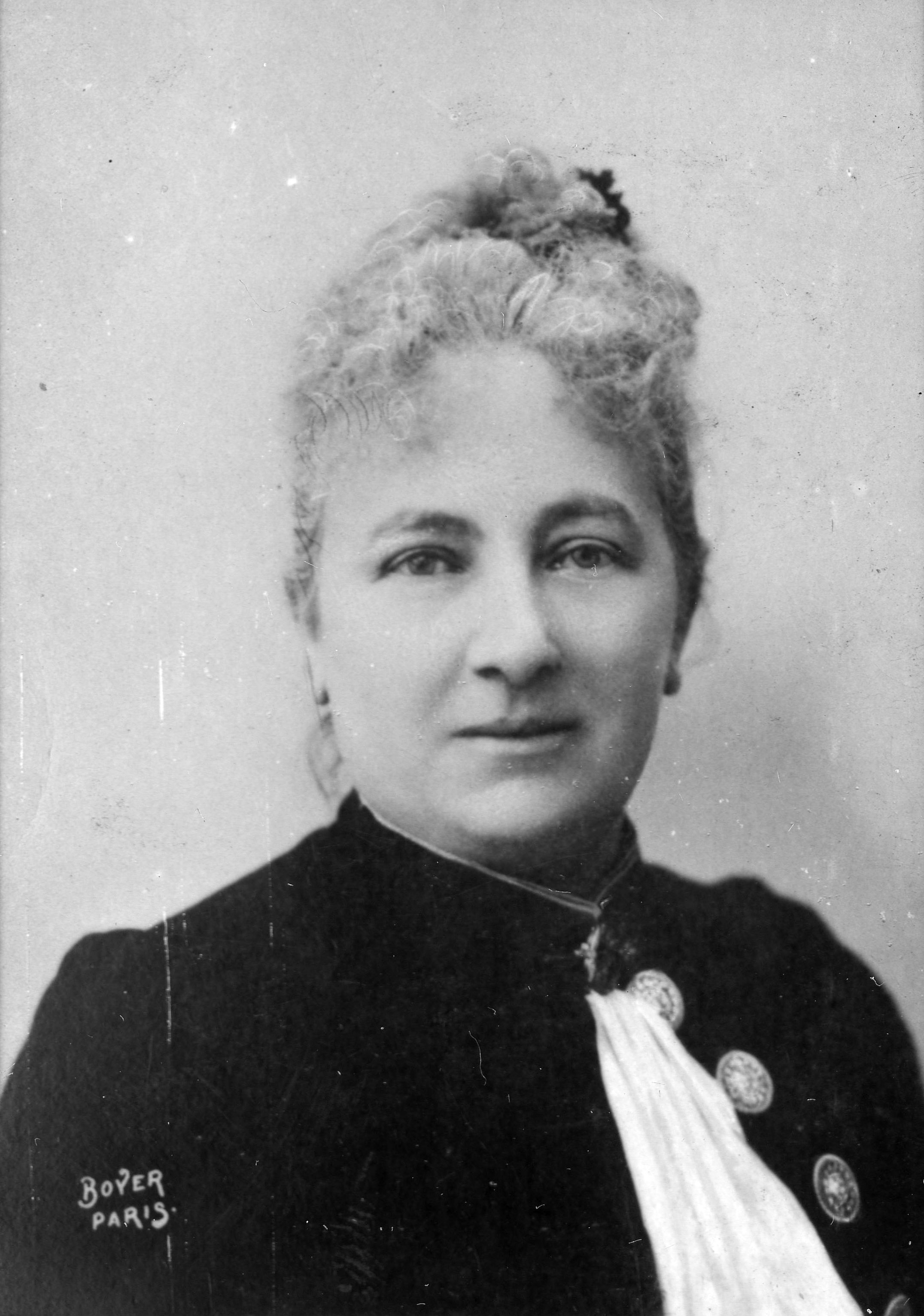
Juliette Adam, c. 1895

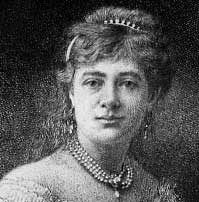
Juliette Adam

Juliette Adam (French pronunciation: [ʒyljɛt adɑ̃]; née Lambert; 4 October 1836 – 23 August 1936) was a French author and feminist.

== Life and career ==
Juliette Adam was born in Verberie (Oise). She gave an account of her childhood, rendered unhappy by the dissensions of her parents, in Le roman de mon enfance et de ma jeunesse (Eng. trans., London and New York, 1902). Her father is described in Paradoxes d'un docteur allemand (published 1860), which shows him to have been sympathetic to feminism.

In 1852, she married a doctor named La Messine, and published in 1858 her Idées antiproudhoniennes sur l'amour, la femme et le mariage, in defense of Daniel Stern (pen name of Marie d'Agoult) and George Sand.

After her first husband's death in 1867, Juliette married Antoine Edmond Adam (1816–1877), prefect of police in 1870, who subsequently became life-senator. She established a salon which was frequented by Gambetta and the other republican leaders against the conservative reaction of the 1870s. In the same interest, she founded the Nouvelle Revue in 1879, which she edited for eight years, and retained influence its administration until 1899. She published writings by Paul Bourget, Pierre Loti, and Guy de Maupassant as well as Octave Mirbeau's novel Le Calvaire. She became involved in the Avant-Courrière (Forerunner) association founded in 1893 by Jeanne Schmahl, which called for the right of women to be witnesses in public and private acts, and for the right of married women to take the product of their labor and dispose of it freely.

Adam became close friends with Yuliana Glinka, who was devoted to theosophy and the occult.

Adam wrote the notes on foreign politics, and was unremitting in her attacks on Bismarck and in her advocacy of a policy of Revanchism. She is generally credited with the authorship of papers on various European capitals signed "Paul Vasili," which were, in reality, the work of various writers. The most famous of her numerous novels is Païenne (1883). Her reminiscences, Mes premières armes littéraires et politiques (1904) and Mes sentiments et nos idées avant 1870 (1905), contain much interesting gossip about her distinguished contemporaries.

In 1882, she purchased the estate of an abbey in Gif-sur-Yvette (Essonne) where she lived from 1904 until her death in Callian (Var) in 1936.

== Selected works ==
- Idées antiproudhoniennes sur l’amour, la femme et le mariage, 1858
- Les provinciaux à Paris, in Paris Guide 1868; English translation Paris for Outsiders 2016
- Laide, 1878
- Grecque, 1879
- Païenne, 1883
- Mes angoisses et nos luttes, Paris, A. Lemerre, 1907
- L'Angleterre en Egypte, Paris, 1922
