= Maurice Grimaud =

Maurice Grimaud (11 November 1913 – 16 July 2009) was the French Prefect of Police, or police chief, of the city of Paris during the May 1968 general strikes and student uprisings. He is credited with avoiding an escalation of violence and bloodshed during the May 1968 unrest.

Grimaud was born in Annonay, Ardèche, on 11 November 1913. He originally studied literature.

Grimaud began his career in civil service with the French colonial administration of Morocco in Rabat. He later worked in both Algeria and Germany. Grimaud also worked as a local governor and aide to then-French Interior Minister François Mitterrand.

== Prefect of Police ==
He succeeded Maurice Papon as Prefect of Police, meaning the head of the Paris police force, in 1967. Grimaud would continue to serve as police chief until 1971, when he was succeeded by Jacques Lenoir.

Starting in May 1968, mass social events occurred in France, involving students and workers. Protests initially began at the University of Nanterre, located west of Paris, when students demanded that men and women be allowed to visit each other's dormrooms. The students' demands soon expanded, basically challenging the whole of Gaullist society. The protests quickly escalated nationwide, as French trade unions went on strike in solidarity with the students, prompting 10 million union workers to call a general strike.

Student protesters seized and occupied buildings on Paris's Left Bank and Sorbonne University. Grimaud was credited with starting a dialogue with the student protesters and promoting police restraint in the face of the protests.

Maurice Grimaud died on 16 July 2009 in Paris at the age of 95.
