= Lozé =

Lozé is a surname. Notable people with the surname include:

- Henri-Auguste Lozé (1850–1915), French politician

== See also ==
- Loze (disambiguation)
