= Raphaël Lépine =

French physiologist (1840–1919)

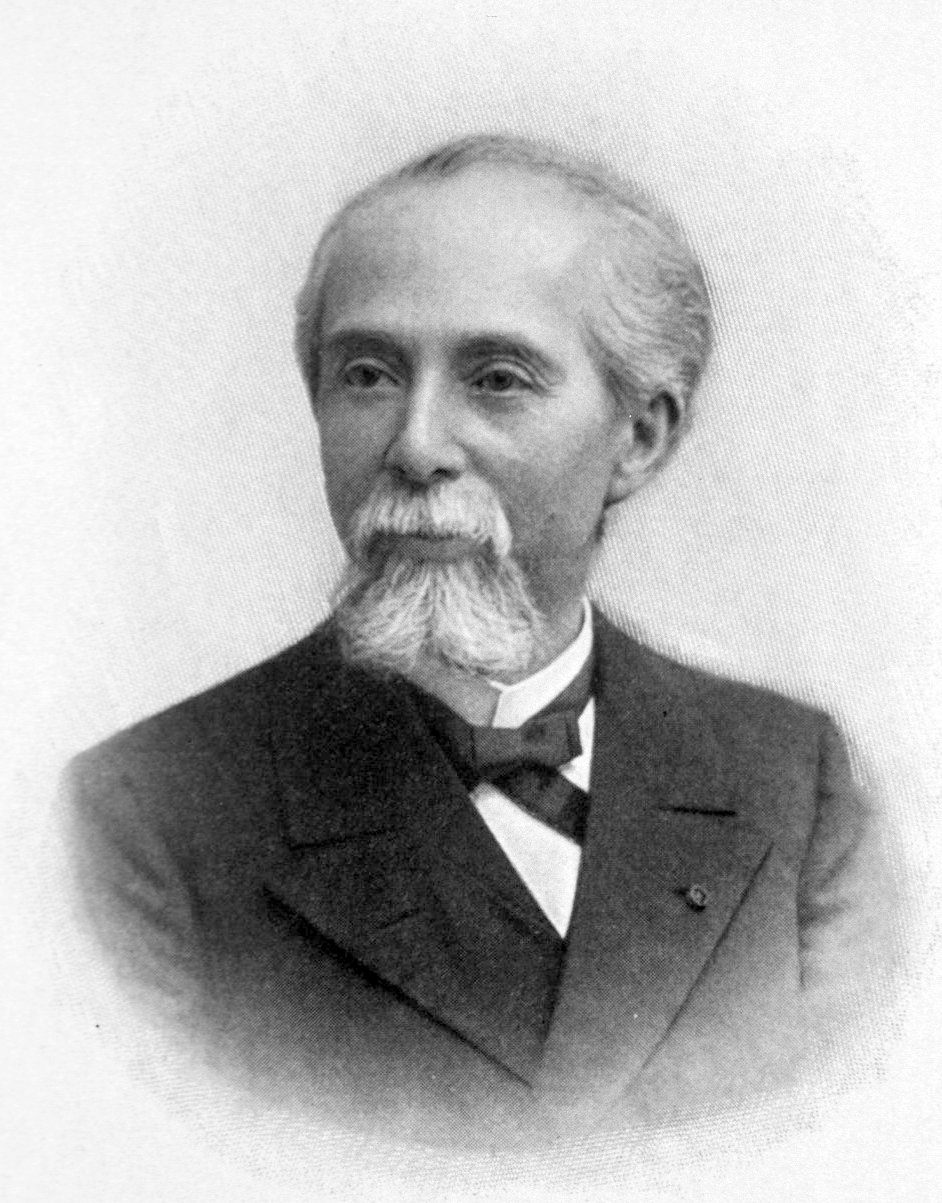
- Born: Jacques Raphaël Lépine; 6 July 1840; Lyon, France
- Died: 17 November 1919 (aged 79)
- Occupation: Physiologist
- Relatives: Louis Lépine (brother)

Jacques Raphaël Lépine (6 July 1840 – 17 November 1919) was a French physiologist who was a native of Lyon.

== Biography ==
From 1860 he served as interne to the hospitals of Lyon, and later moved to Paris, where from 1865 he also worked as a hospital intern. In Paris he was a student of Jean-Martin Charcot (1825–1893). Afterwards, he continued his education at the universities of Berlin (1867) and Leipzig (1869). At Karl Ludwig's laboratory in Leipzig he performed important studies on the vasomotor nerves of the tongue.

In 1870 he obtained his doctorate in Paris with a dissertation titled "De l'hémiplégie pneumonique". In Paris he successively became chef de clinique (1872), médecin des hôpitaux (1874) and agrégé at the Paris faculty (1875). In 1877 he was appointed professor at the medical clinic of the newly established medical faculty in Lyons.

Raphaël Lépine is known for his investigations in experimental medicine, that included extensive research involving glycolysis and the pathophysiology of diabetes.

He was the brother of Louis Lépine, Prefect of Police for the Seine from 1893 to 1897 and again from 1899 to 1913.

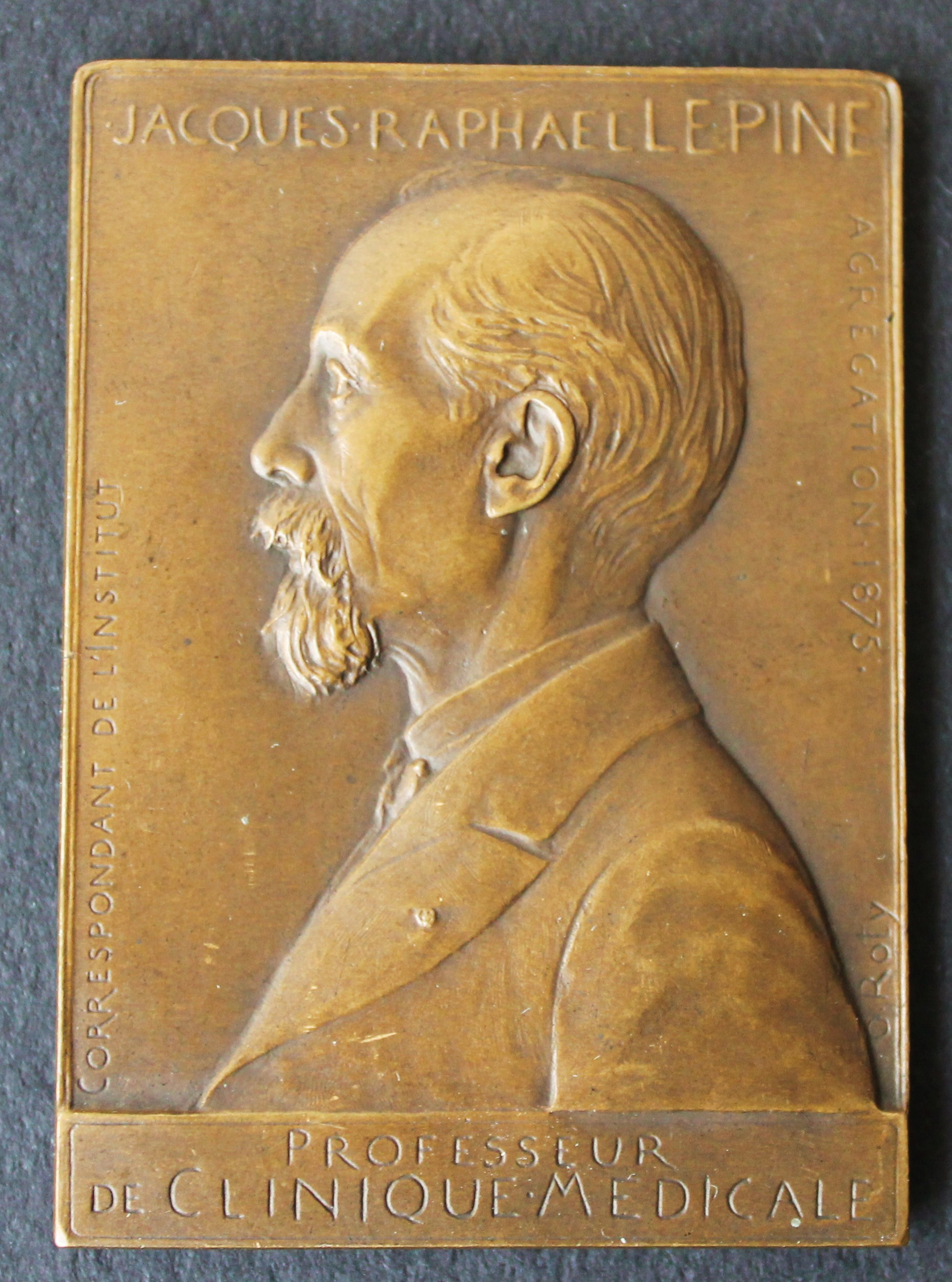
Jacques Raphaël Lépine by Louis-Oscar Roty

== Selected writings ==
- Sur un cas d'abcès d'un des lobes antérieurs du cerveau; Abscess of the anterior lobes of the brain
- De l'hémiplégie pneumonique (1870) --- On pneumonic hemiplegia
- De la localisation dans les maladies cérébrales (1875) --- Localization in brain diseases
- Additions à la traduction francaise du Traité des maladies des reins de Bartels (1884) --- Additions to the French translation of the treatise on kidney diseases by Karl Heinrich Christian Bartels.
- Le Ferment glycolytique et la pathogénie du diabète (1891) --- The glycolytic ferment and pathogenesis of diabetes
- Influence de la faradisation des nerfs du pancréas sur la glycolyse (1899)
- Le diabète et son traitement (1899) --- Diabetes and its treatment
- Le diabète non compliqué et son traitement (1905)
- Les complications du diabète et leur traitement (1906) --- Diabetic complications and treatment
- Le Sucre virtuel du sang (1910) with R. Boulud --- The virtual blood sugar
- Sur la résorption du sucre par les tubes du rein (1911) --- On the absorption of sugar by the tubes of the kidney.
