= Célestin Hennion =

French police officer (1862–1915)

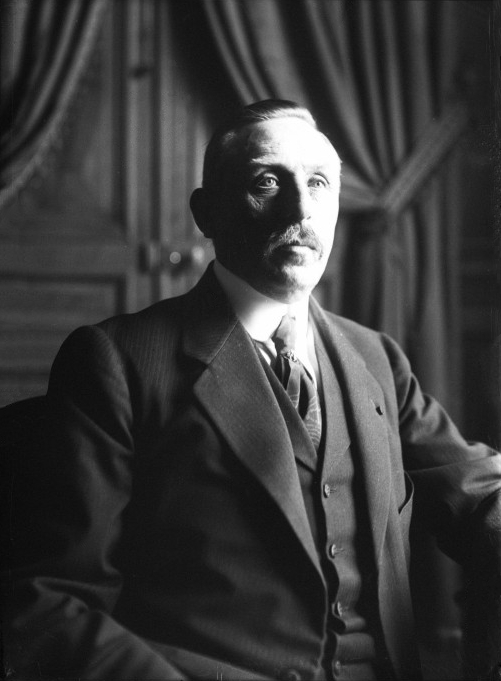
- Hennion in 1914
- Born: 8 September 1862; Gommegnies, France
- Died: 14 March 1915 (aged 52); Sainte-Adresse, France
- Other name: Le géant blond ("The blond giant")
- Relatives: Davina McCall (great-granddaughter)
- Police career
- Allegiance: France
- Service years: 1886–1914
- Rank: Préfet de Police
- Awards: Colonial Medal; Knight of the Order of Nichan Iftikhar; Commandeur de la Légion d'honneur Honorary Commander of the Royal Victorian Order

Célestin Hennion CVO (8 September 1862 – 14 March 1915) was a French police officer who rose to head the Prefecture of Police (French: Préfecture de Police). He was responsible for the reorganisation of the Préfecture and the introduction of The Tiger Brigades, the precursor of the French judicial police. In France, he is considered to be one of the pioneers of modern policing.

== Early life ==
Hennion was born in Gommegnies in 1862, to Joseph Ghislain Hannion, a farm labourer, and Marie-Catherine Basilaire and he was educated at Lycée Le Quesnoy. After leaving grammar school he joined the French Army, and was posted to Tunisia as part of the 110th Infantry Regiment, from 1880 until 1885 during which time Tunisia became a French Protectorate.

== Police career ==
On returning to France he joined the police force and in 1886 was an inspector in a specialised railways squad. Hennion had a rapid rise through the force, and was moved into intelligence work where he investigated organisations intent on over-throwing the Third Republic. During the 1890s, Hennion investigated the counter-evidence provided by Georges Picquart during the Dreyfus affair, becoming a strong supporter of Alfred Dreyfus. Hennion also thwarted several attacks against political figures and the state, including the 1899 coup d'état by Paul Déroulède, and was dispatched with additional troops to quell unrest in Rennes during the second Dreyfus trial. In 1899 Hennion was given the responsibility of protecting the French Head of State.

On 30 January 1907, Hennion was made the Director of General Security by Georges Clemenceau, and that year Hennion suggested the creation of mobile police brigades, which later became known as the Brigades du Tigre. Hennion was part of modernist movement within the French republic that included people like Aristide Briand and Louis Lépine, the Préfet de Police from 1899 to 1913, who brought new ideas into French policing, introducing forensic equipment and methods of investigation.

In 1910 Hennion set up the first police training school, a vocational school for active service staff of the 'Prefecture de Police'. The next year, Hennion set up the Brigade Renseignements Généraux, which later become the Direction centrale des renseignements généraux, a committed intelligence service of the French Police. Hennion continually pushed to separate the policing within France from political control, and in 1911 unsuccessfully attempted to replace the de facto mayoral command with that of the chief of police.

Hennion was appointed Préfet de Police on 31 March 1913, succeeding Louis Lépine. He was in post for too short a period to be totally effective but he continued the reforms of his predecessor dividing the police force into three main departments: judicial, intelligence and policy agenda. Ill health forced his retirement from the post on 2 September 1914.

Hennion died in March 1915 and he is buried in the family tomb in Gommegnies, France.

== Honours ==
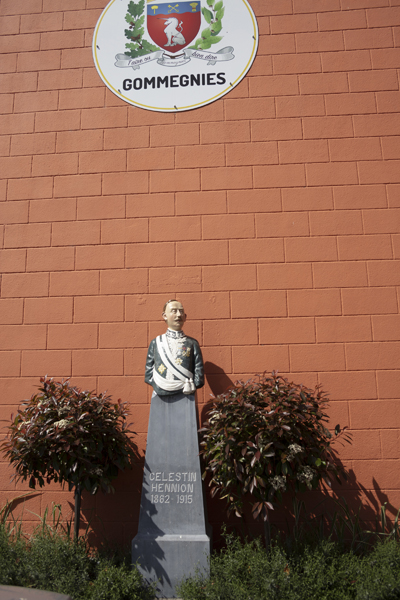
Bust of Hennion in Gommegnies

For his services in the French Army, Hennion was awarded the Colonial Medal, was made a Knight of the Order of Nichan Iftikhar and was appointed an Officer of the Légion d'honneur on 4 July 1905, with promotion to Commander on 30 January 1913. For his services as a senior policeman during visits to France by King Edward VII he was appointed Honorary Member (Fourth Class) of the Royal Victorian Order in 1906 and promoted to Honorary Commander in 1908.

== Notable relatives ==
The first episode of the 7th series of the BBC television programme Who Do You Think You Are? revealed that English television presenter Davina McCall is Hennion's great-granddaughter. Pierre, Hennion's son and McCall's grandfather, gave McCall his father's Royal Victorian Order medal, which she showed on the programme.

In the programme, which was broadcast on 15 July 2009, McCall learned of Hennion's story from historians Jean-Marc Berliere and Simon Kitson as well as from Françoise Hennion (the policeman's granddaughter) and from Dreyfus's great-granddaughter, Yael Ruiz.

== Cultural references ==
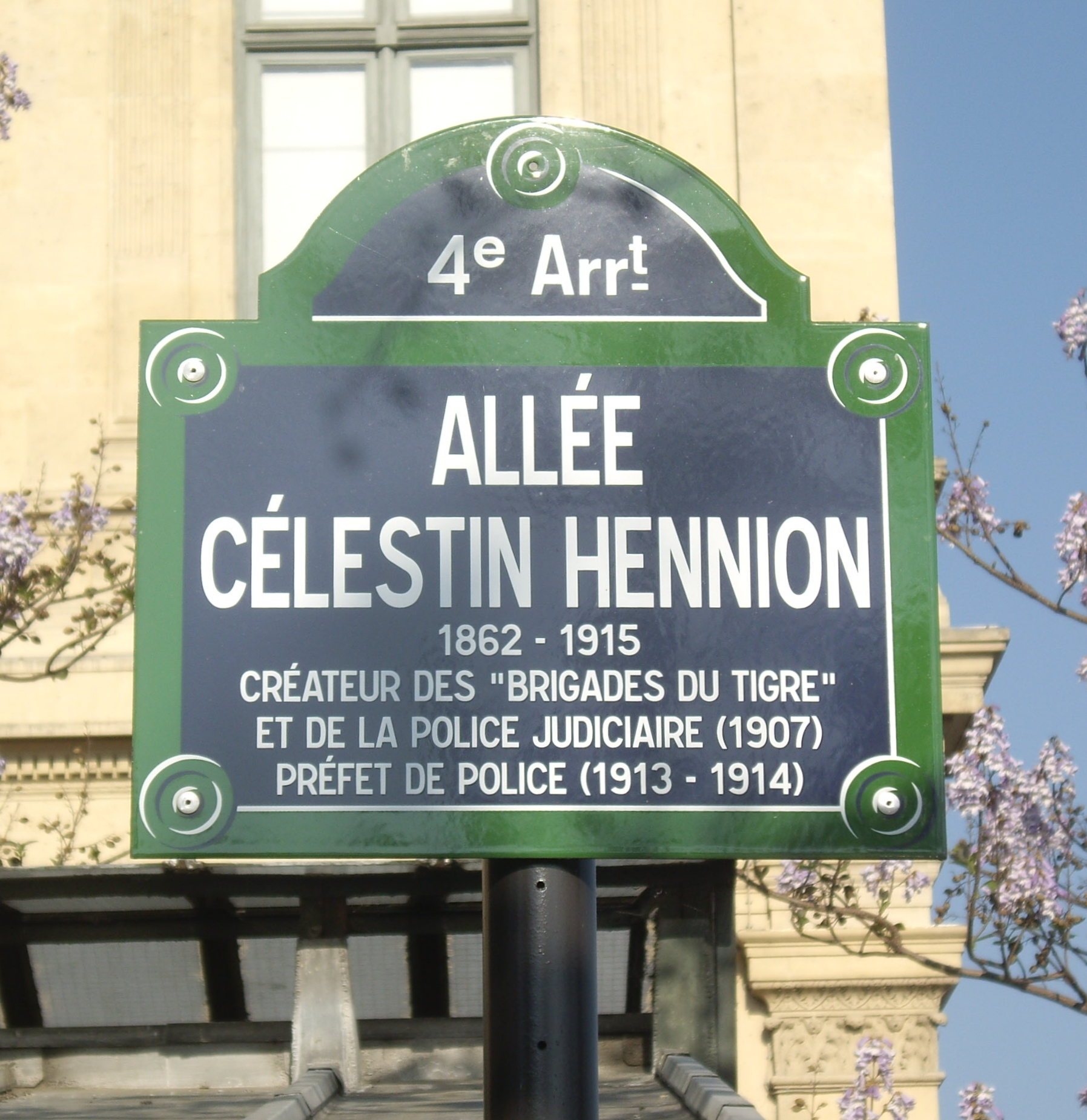
Plaque on the Célestin-Hennion alley off the Louis-Lépine square in Paris.

- In the 2006 feature film Les Brigades du Tigre, Hennion was played by Mathias Mlekuz.
- In 2020 TV series The Bonfire of Destiny premised on the aftermath of the deadly fire at Le Bazar de la Charité in Paris in 1897, he is played by Stéphane Guillon as director of the Sûreté Nationale, national intelligence agency.

== Bibliography ==
- Berlière, Jean-Marc (1993). Le Préfet Lépine, vers la naissance de la police moderne. Paris: Denoel. ISBN 978-2207240120. (in French)
- Berlière, Jean-Marc (2008). "La carrière exceptionnelle d'un commissaire spécial dans la IIIe République : Célestin Hennion", in Le Commissaire de police au XIXe siècle. director Kalifa, Dominique. Paris: Presses de la Sorbonne. ISBN 978-2-85944-595-9. (in French)
- Davies, Diane E.; Pereira, Anthony W. (2003). Irregular Armed Forces and their role in politics and state formation. Cambridge: Cambridge University Press. ISBN 978-0-511-05832-5. (in English)
