= Chelsea Arts Club =

Members' club in Chelsea, London

Coordinates: 51.4880°N 0.1746°W

The Chelsea Arts Club
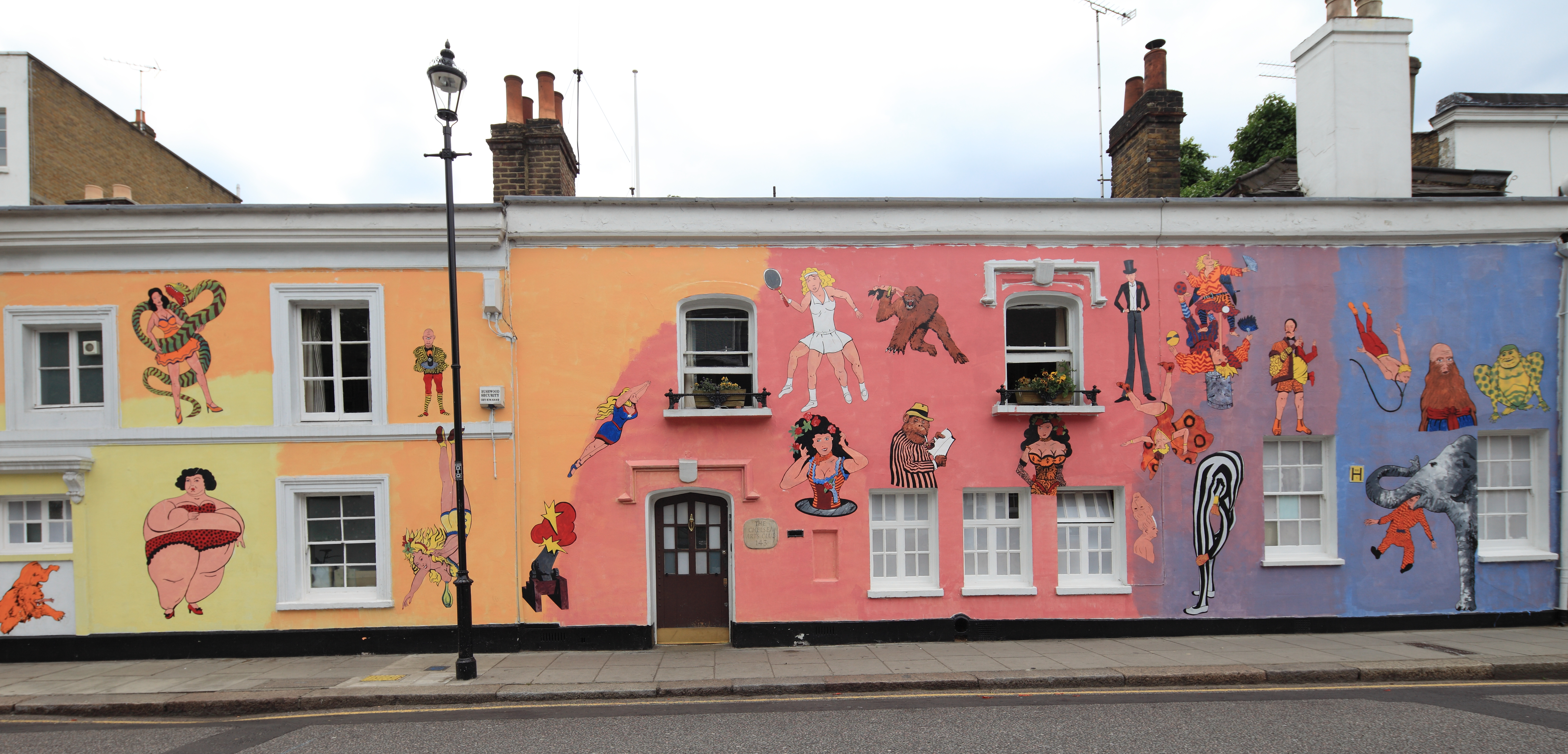
- Chelsea Arts Club clubhouse
- Formation: 15 November 1890
- Headquarters: London, England, United Kingdom
- Location: 143 Old Church Street, London SW3 6EB
- Region served: London
- Members: 4,000+
- Website: http://www.chelseaartsclub.com

Chelsea Arts Club is a private members' club at 143 Old Church Street in Chelsea, London with a membership of over 4,000, including artists, sculptors, architects, writers, designers, actors, musicians, photographers, and filmmakers. The club was established on 15 November 1890 (in Chelsea), as a rival to the older Arts Club in Mayfair, on the instigation of the artist James Abbott McNeill Whistler, who had been a (sometimes controversial) member of the older club.

During its primary events season from September to April, Chelsea Arts Club serves as a host for many functions, from instrumental and choral performances to film nights, literary talks and weekend artist lunches. Exhibitions of Members’ work are held throughout the year.

Applicants for membership need to be sponsored by two current Members.

The club is located in the former Bolton Lodge, a Grade II listed building on the National Heritage List for England.

== History ==
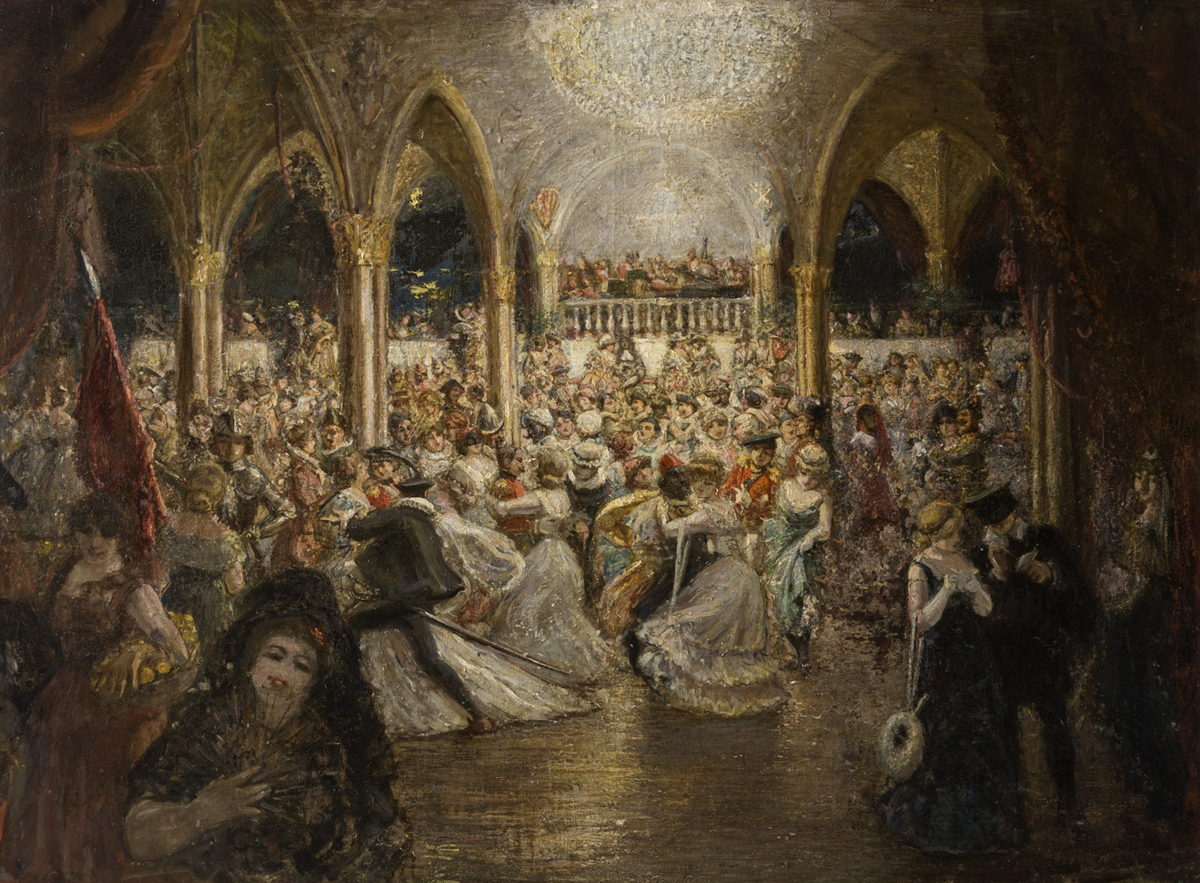
The Chelsea Art Ball by William Gordon Burn Murdoch

Chelsea Arts Club was originally located in rooms at no. 181 King's Road. In 1902, the club moved to larger premises at no. 143 Old Church Street. In 1933 the club's premises, which had an acre of garden, were remodeled. The clubhouse includes a snooker room, bedrooms, dining room, former 'ladies bar' turned private party room, and a garden.

From 1908 to 1958 the club held a series of public fancy dress balls, the Chelsea Arts Club Balls at the Royal Albert Hall, latterly on New Year's Eve, which raised funds for artists' charities. In 1958, balls were banned from the Albert Hall owing to their notoriety for rowdiness, nudity and public homosexuality (illegal before 1967). Subsequently, private functions were held at the club instead, with similarly lavish decorations and themes.

In 1966 the club was redecorated, a new bar was opened, and membership was opened to women artists.

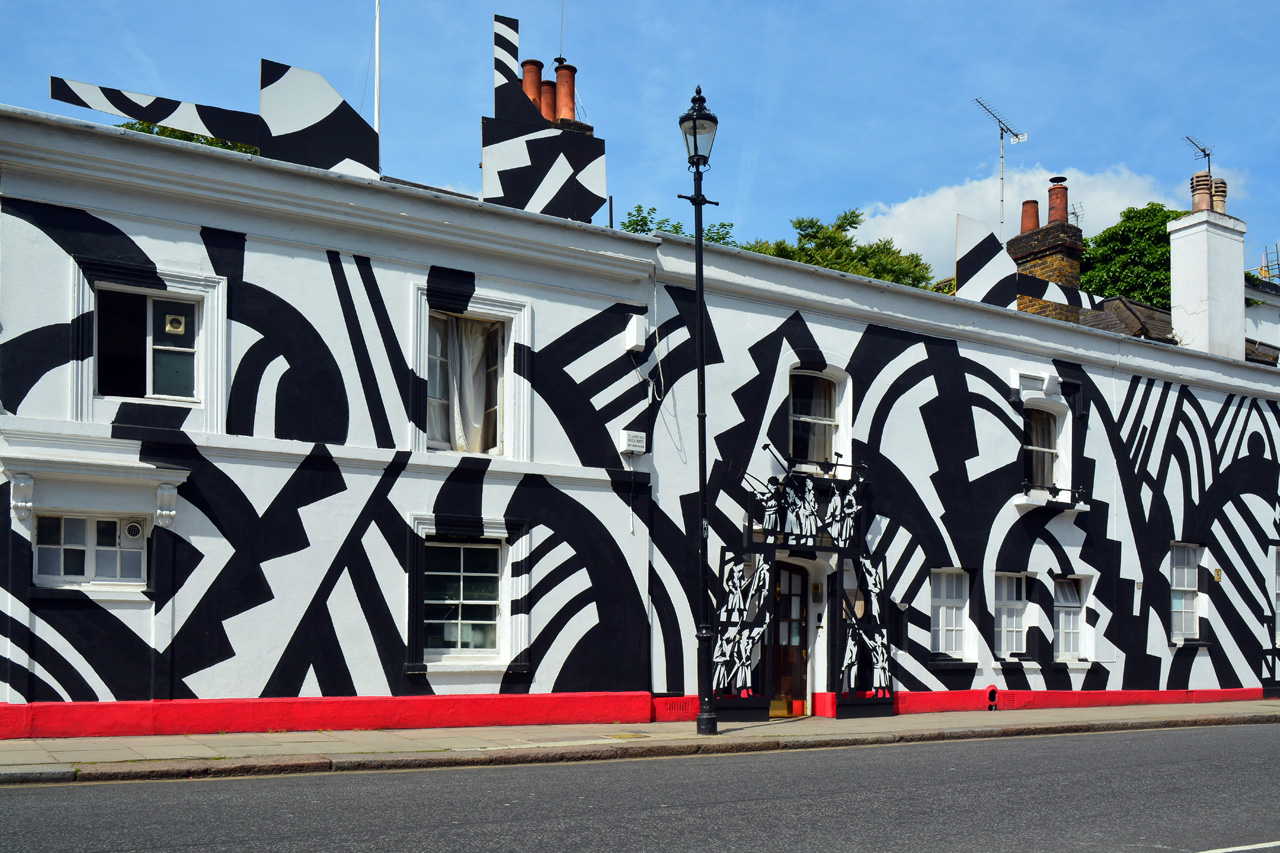
The building painted with dazzle camouflage

The club exterior is often painted, for example by scenic artists Tony Common, Annie Ralli and Annie Millar. In 2010 it was painted bright colours with images of circus performers, and in 2011 was painted to appear as if it had been bombed in order to coincide with celebrations marking 70 years since the end of The Blitz.

== See also ==
- Gentlemen's club
- List of gentlemen's clubs in London

== Sources ==
- Anthony Lejeune, Gentlemen's Clubs of London, London: Macdonald And Jane's, 1979 (ill. Malcolm Lewis). ISBN 0-8317-3800-6.
- Tom Cross, Artists and Bohemians: 100 Years with the Chelsea Arts Club, London: Quiller Press, 1992. ISBN 9781870948609.
- Thévoz, Seth Alexander (2025). London Clubland: A Companion for the Curious. London: Robinson/Little, Brown. ISBN 978-1472149985.
