= FlowStop =

French company

- Type: Private
- Industry: flood protection
- Founded: 2021
- Founder: Olivier Guillou; Bertrand Sylvestre-Boncheval; Alex Cammarano
- Headquarters: Perpignan, France
- Website: https://www.flowstopfloodbarrier.com

FlowStop is a French company specializing in flood protection equipment, including inflatable flood barriers for building openings.

== History ==
FlowStop originated from a flood barrier concept developed by Olivier Guillou in 2019. The company was established, two years later, in 2021.

At the end of 2024, FlowStop established a distribution subsidiary in the United States. In 2026, the company announced the opening of a manufacturing facility in New Hampshire (USA).

== Activities ==
FlowStop produces removable flood protection devices. Its main product is an inflatable flood barrier used for building openings, including doors, garages, sliding glass doors and technical rooms.

== Recognition ==
In May 2023, FlowStop received the Prime Minister's Award at the Concours Lépine.
