= Chelsea Arts Club Ball =

Former annual ball in London

Coordinates: 51.501276°N 0.177463°W

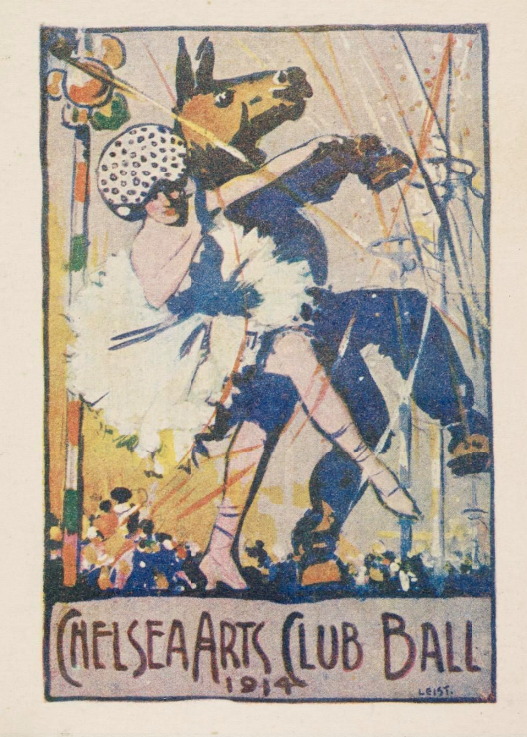
The programme for the 1914 ball, illustration by Fred Leist

The Chelsea Arts Club Ball was an annually held ball. It was organised by the Chelsea Arts Club and hosted in the Royal Albert Hall. The last ball was held in 1958.

== Background ==
Fancy dress parties began being held by artists in their studios in the 1880s. The Chelsea Arts Club would be founded in 1891, and, likely inspired by French artists' balls such as the Bal des Quat'z'Arts, would start to host balls of their own. These more limited affairs in comparison to what was to come would be continued into the early 1900s in the Chelsea Town Hall.

The first of the more official balls was the 1908 ball held in the Royal Opera House. Devised by George Sherwood Foster, they emerged as a great success. After another ball in the same venue the following year, the ball would be held in the Royal Albert Hall from 1910 until its last in 1958 with a short hiatus during the First World War. John Singer Sargent would play a part in encouraging the move, offering financial security. Occasionally held on Mardi Gras, similarly to their French counterparts, the ball would come to be more firmly associated with New Year's Eve.

== Description ==
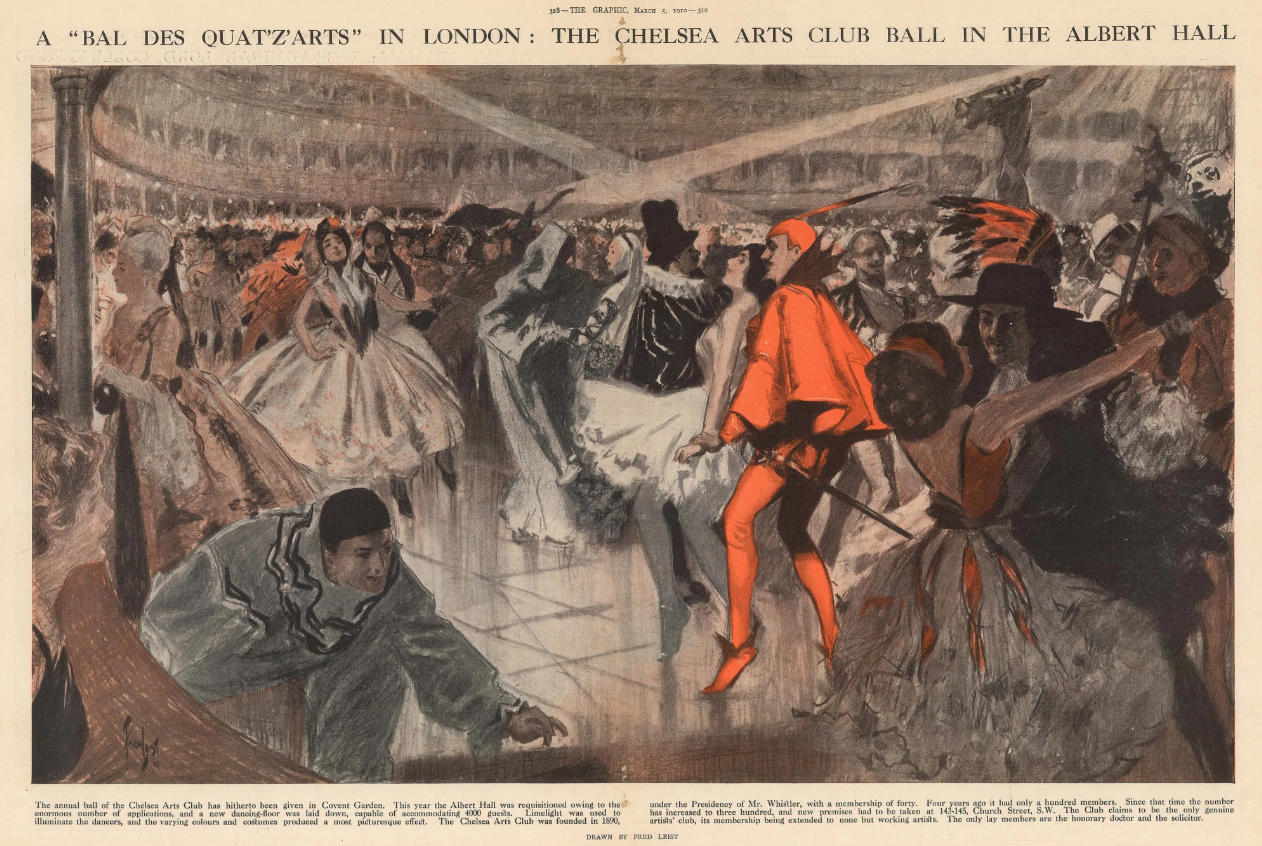
Illustration of the first ball held in the Royal Albert Hall, Fred Leist (1910)

The balls would be known for their bohemian character, reflecting that of the arts club itself. Themes would include "Dazzle", "Prehistoric", "Old English", "Noah's Ark", "Sun Worship" and "The Naked Truth". Artists would often create their own costumes and designs would often be unrestrained. To enable dancers to find partners, the floor would house meeting places which often displayed caricatures of well known figures, including politicians.

Beyond informing the elaborate costumes and decorations, the theme of the ball would describe the nature of extravagant performances. Its reputation for bizarre costumes and displays would cause the ball to be remembered as possibly the "most scandalous event in the social calendar".

The 1924 was held in partnership with Bystander, celebrating its "coming of age". The event was highly publicised, which brought it fame but also controversy within the club as members saw the increased press exposure as undue attention.

The times describes the scenes of the ball held in 1924, with an attendance of 4,000:

On the stroke of midnight the figures on the birthday cake came to life, and the cake itself opened to give up a store of gifts to the dancers — chocolates for Pierrette and cigarettes for Pierrot. Then, with the New Year came the customary mummery. This time we had a “gondola” from the Slade (with a real lantern in the stern) as a point of vantage in a “Carnival of Venice”. There was an elephant, too, from the Central School of Arts and Crafts, and a monstrous bird, who, seconded from the South Kensington School of Art, came as a phoenix. In the wake of these came, not inappropriately, a “hunting scene”, taken straight from the classics by medical students.

== Development ==
The ball would be a major success, and given its widespread recognition its management was separated from being directly under the Chelsea Arts Club in 1912. Much of the profits would go towards charitable causes throughout its lifetime. The First World War would pause the holding of balls but they would retain their popularity after the war. 1919 saw the traditional Mardi Gras date as well as one on New Year's Eve which would become the more established date for the ball. The years following also saw involvement from larger committees and external collaborators, the 1919 ball would be connected to the Prince of Wales for example.

The 1920s would see the structure of the event become more formalised with clearer themes. External contractors were increasingly used. The 1920s and 1930s would see problems arise in a number of the balls, but they would generally remain successful.

The balls remained successful after World War II but would run into financial difficulties in the 1950s. Operating at a loss, the balls would be deemed unsustainable, the last being held in 1958.

== See also ==
- Chelsea Arts Club
- Shakespeare Memorial National Theatre Ball
- Costume party
