= Louis Lépine =

French public administrator (1846–1933)

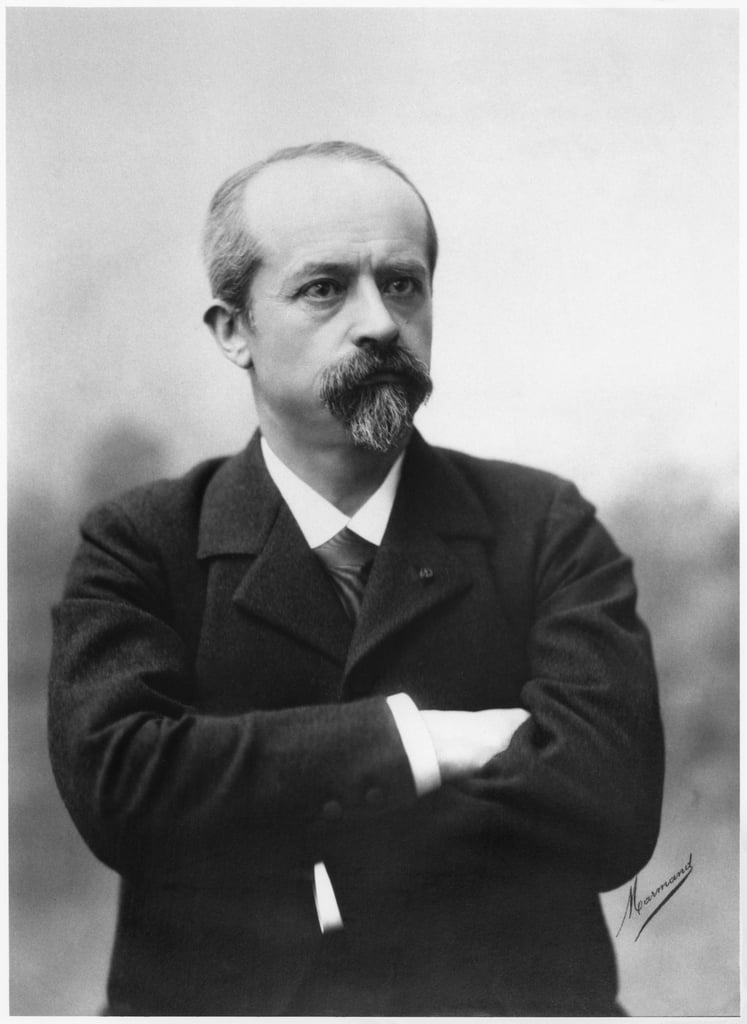

Governor General of Algeria
- In office 1 October 1897 – 26 July 1898
- Preceded by: Henri-Auguste Lozé
- Succeeded by: Édouard Laferrière

Prefect of Police of Paris
- In office 23 June 1899 – 29 March 1913
- Preceded by: Charles Blanc
- Succeeded by: Célestin Hennion
- In office 11 July 1893 – 14 October 1897
- Preceded by: Henri-Auguste Lozé
- Succeeded by: Charles Blanc

Personal details
- Born: Louis Jean-Baptiste Lépine; 6 August 1846 Lyon, France
- Died: 9 November 1933 (aged 87) Paris, France
- Relations: Raphaël Lépine (brother)
- Awards: Médaille militaire
- Nickname(s): "The Little Man with the Big Stick", "The Prefect of the Street"

Louis Jean-Baptiste Lépine (French pronunciation: [lwi ʒɑ̃batist lepin]; 6 August 1846 – 9 November 1933) was a French lawyer, politician and administrator who was Governor General of Algeria from 1897 to 1898 and twice Prefect of Police with the Paris Police Prefecture from 1893 to 1897 and again from 1899 to 1913.

On each occasion he assumed office during a period of instability in the governance of the French State and was seen by his supporters as a man who could bring order. He earned the nickname of "The Little Man with the Big Stick" for his methodology in handling large Parisian crowds. During his periods as Prefect of Police he instigated a series of reforms that modernised the French Police Force. An efficient and clear-sighted administrator, he introduced scientific analysis into policing with reforms in forensic science and the training of detectives.

Lépine was also responsible for convening and re-invigorating the Exposition Universelle whereby an annual competition known as the Concours Lépine was introduced for inventors and innovators to have their work presented and acclaimed; an annual competition that has now had 120-plus editions.

== Early life ==
Louis Lépine studied law in his home city of Lyon and in Paris and Heidelberg. He served with distinction in the French Army during the Franco-Prussian War from 1870 to 1871. Serving as a sergeant major at Belfort in the Alsace region, his unit was besieged and continually attacked by the Prussians. It surrendered only after the hostilities had ceased. Lépine was awarded the Médaille militaire for his bravery. He then embarked on a career as a lawyer and public administrator, that included provincial postings as subprefect of Lapalisse, Montbrison, Langres and Fontainebleau and then prefect of Indre, Loire and Seine-et-Oise.

== The 1893 student uprising in Paris ==
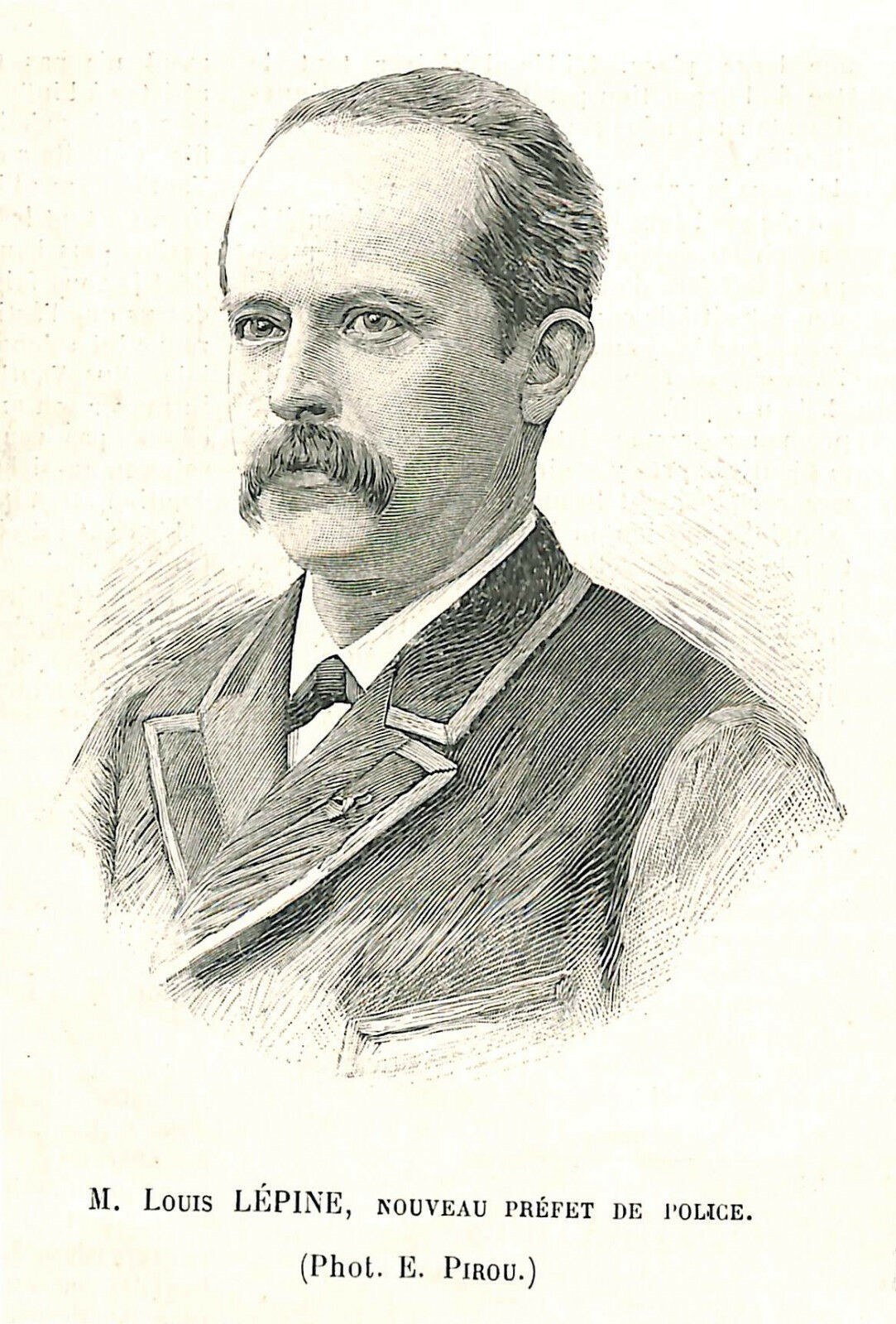
Louis Lépine, the "new prefect of police" in 1893

In 1893 Lépine became prefect of police of the Seine (Paris) at a time when Paris and indeed France was politically volatile. His appointment was, in response, to the perceived failure of the previous Prefect Henri-Auguste Lozé to quell serious student riots during the 1893 edition of the Bal des Quat'z'Arts . The riots that had taken place arose out of a trivial incident involving the arrest of an actress Sarah Brown (aka Marie Royer), a student called Nuger and a confrontation with a policeman, the consequence of which was the death of Nuger. On the following Monday, 1,000 demonstrators marched onto the Chamber of Deputies, determined to be provided with an adequate explanation. The Deputies summarily retreated and by the evening a further 1,000 students were outside and by now the mood of the demonstrators had turned hostile. At the end of the day barricades were erected around the district of the Boulevard Saint-Germain.

The police had lost control of the situation and the National Guard was called in to regain control. Several days of bloodshed followed as several important workers’ organisations sided with the so-called students. Within five days of the arrest of Sarah Brown, the students were submerged within a violent mob that was ready to fight for control of Paris. The French Republic seemed in danger and reacted with extreme force with an estimated 20,000 troops deployed to quell the uprising. It was against this backdrop that Louis Lépine succeeded to the Prefecture of Police for Paris with a reputation as a disciplinarian prepared to use the "big stick" to keep Paris under control. Lépine’s tactics were to allow the various factions to march through Paris but to defuse any violent confrontations, by the use of innovative tactics of crowd control that in effect kept the factions, apart and confined to certain areas of Paris, arriving at the planned rendezvous in stages.

== The modernisation of the police ==
Lépine is credited as a founder of modern French policing. At the time of his first tenure the police had become renowned for corruption and low standards: trust between the police and the public was very low. Lépine recognised that if France was not to relapse into military government the relationship between the civil police and the public had to change to become one of mutual trust. The assassination in Lyon in June 1894 of President Carnot, the 5th President of the Republic was the impetus for Lépine to introduce measures to overhaul policing in France. Thus he set an agenda of reform, that was continued during his second period in office, beginning by carefully codified police procedures and regulations, improving the professional quality of the police force with the introduction of examinations and promotions and by introducing forensic science into the work of the detective. It was during his time as prefect of police that fingerprinting became established as a method of identification. The examinations for police that he instituted were very thorough: the tests for example included determining methods of forgery and examining lock components involved in a burglary so as to tell if a lock had been picked. As befits his training as a lawyer, his was the first prefecture to introduce criminology into policing and to examine the psychology of criminals.

Amongst his other innovations, he introduced the white stick for directing traffic and established the river-boat brigade and armed police bicycle units. He installed a series of 500 telephone warning boxes to alert the public and fire services to fire, and he began the reorganisation of traffic movements within Paris by introducing one-way systems and roundabouts.

== The Dreyfus affair ==
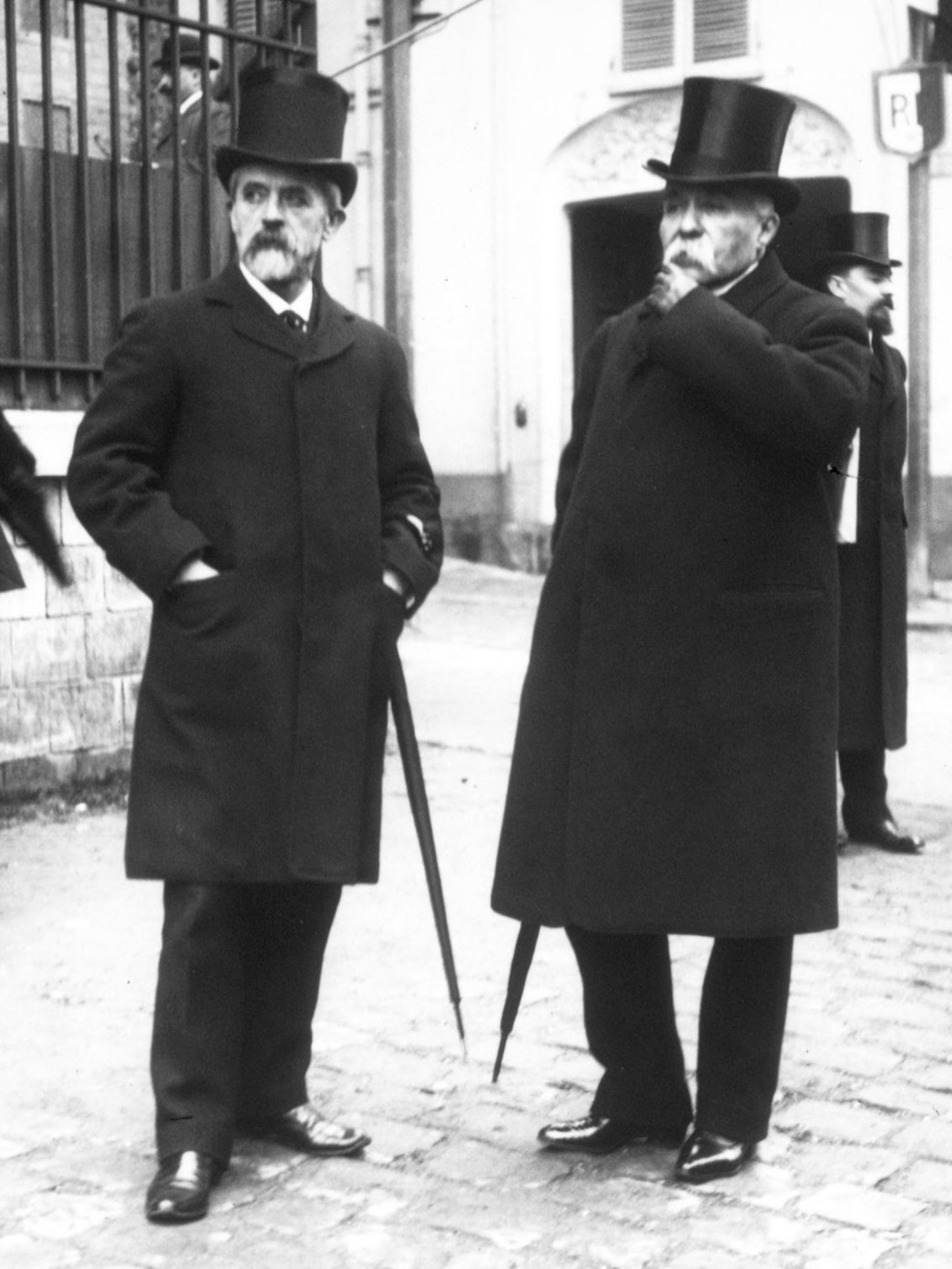
Louis Lépine & Georges Clemenceau in 1908

.

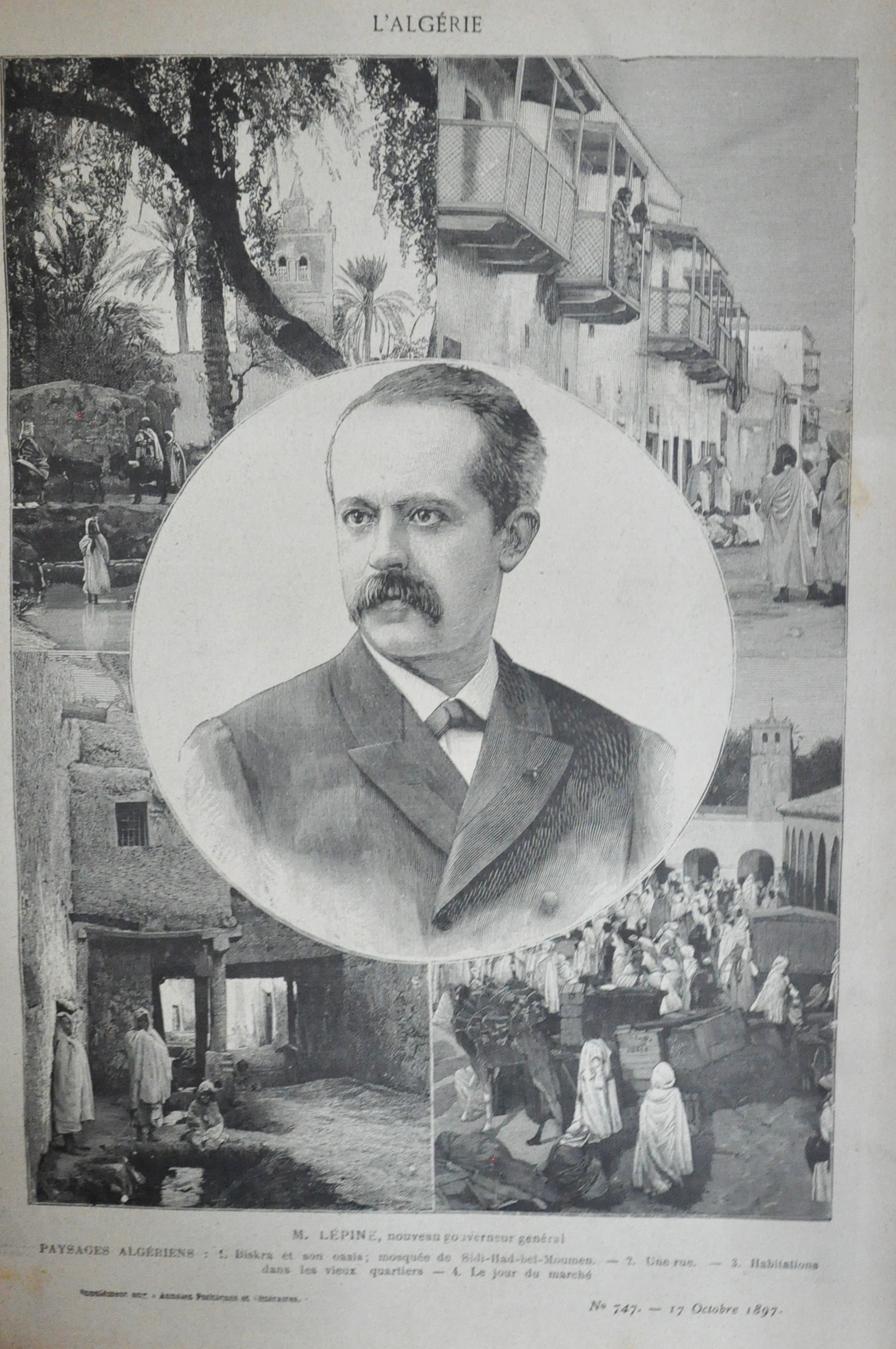
Governor of Algeria (1897-1899)

.

Lépine succeeded Jules Cambon as Governor-General of Algeria in September 1897, serving less than a year in the post. He was recalled to Paris as the Dreyfus Affair began to unravel the Third Republic. (Note: In 1894 Alfred Dreyfus, an Alsatian of Jewish descent, had been found guilty of treason and sentenced to life imprisonment for allegedly having communicated French military secrets to Germany. Lépine had officiated at the original trial. When two years later it became apparent that Dreyfus was innocent, as another culprit had been found, a retrial was ordered. The military court once again found Dreyfus guilty on the basis of false documents fabricated by French counter-intelligence officers. There was widespread dissent against the proceedings that culminated in a vehement public protestation from Émile Zola, the novelist. Another retrial was subsequently ordered, and this time Dreyfus was freed, although he was not exonerated until 1906) France seemed to be at the start of major civil unrest in 1899, and Louis Lépine was recalled to help control and placate the opposition. A series of virulent anti-Semitic articles against Dreyfus that appeared in the Catholic newspaper La Croix had inflamed an already febrile atmosphere. In 1901 a newly elected anti-clerical National Assembly polarised French society. France faced the possibility of a military pro-clerical intervention and open chaos.

As head of the Paris Police Lépine played a crucial role in allaying the fears of the various factions. He successfully limited the role of the army as a force of internal order by handling most situations using solely the Parisienne police and the gendarmerie. A military government was avoided and whilst there were occasions when Lépine required military assistance to control demonstrations, the reforms in civil policing that Lépine had introduced were robust enough for these interventions to occur sparingly. In most instances the gendarmerie under Lépine were trusted and able to manage civil strife.

== Police Prefect, 1900–1913 ==
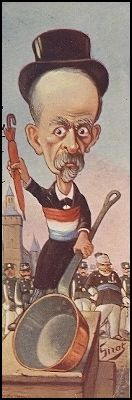
A satirical view of Lépine by Sirat from 1904

The final decade of Lépine's tenure as préfet de police proved not to be as politically dramatic as his early years. He continued in the task of reforming the police force intent on creating a modern police force to meet the needs of Paris and France. In 1900 he founded the Musée des Collections Historiques de la Préfecture de Police in response to the Exposition Universelle. The museum concentrated on the forensic science of policing and has gradually grown through subsequent years. It now contains evidence, photographs, letters, memorabilia, and drawings that reflect major events in the history of France (including conspiracies and arrests), famous criminal cases and characters, prisons, and daily life in the capital such as traffic and hygiene. In 1912 he founded a detective training school based on modern forensic methods of training. This was a lasting legacy and was a methodology admired and copied by other countries. (Note: The article subtitled "M.Lépine, Head of The Police Department, Creates a School for Training Detectives" is available at https://timesmachine.nytimes.com/timesmachine/1912/08/25/100374695.pdf New York Times August 25, 1912.)

=== The Great Flood of Paris ===
Lépine faced a number of high-profile events and crimes during this period of office. In late January 1910, following months of high rainfall, the River Seine in Paris flooded the French capital, reaching a maximum height of 8.62 metres. The Great Flood of Paris as it is colloquially known caused extensive damage and forced thousands out of their homes. The infrastructure within Paris came close to destruction and there were major concerns for public health. France mobilised to save its capital. Lépine whose office included public health proved as tough and authoritarian as he had been on policing matters. In the flood's aftermath he oversaw the establishment of new procedures to address the problems of flooding. The instructions explained the importance of chemical cleansing and institutionalized the growing medical consensus about the causes of water borne diseases that had been controversial just a few years earlier.

Armand Fallières, president of the French Republic and Lépine worked closely with each other at the outset of the flood as they were concerned that Paris could dissolve into major disorder if the government response was seen to be ineffectual. In the event major disturbances were largely avoided. Throughout the crisis Lépine was a visible presence attempting to lead from the front by reassuring Parisians that order would be maintained alongside the humanitarian efforts that were taking place.

=== The theft of the Mona Lisa ===
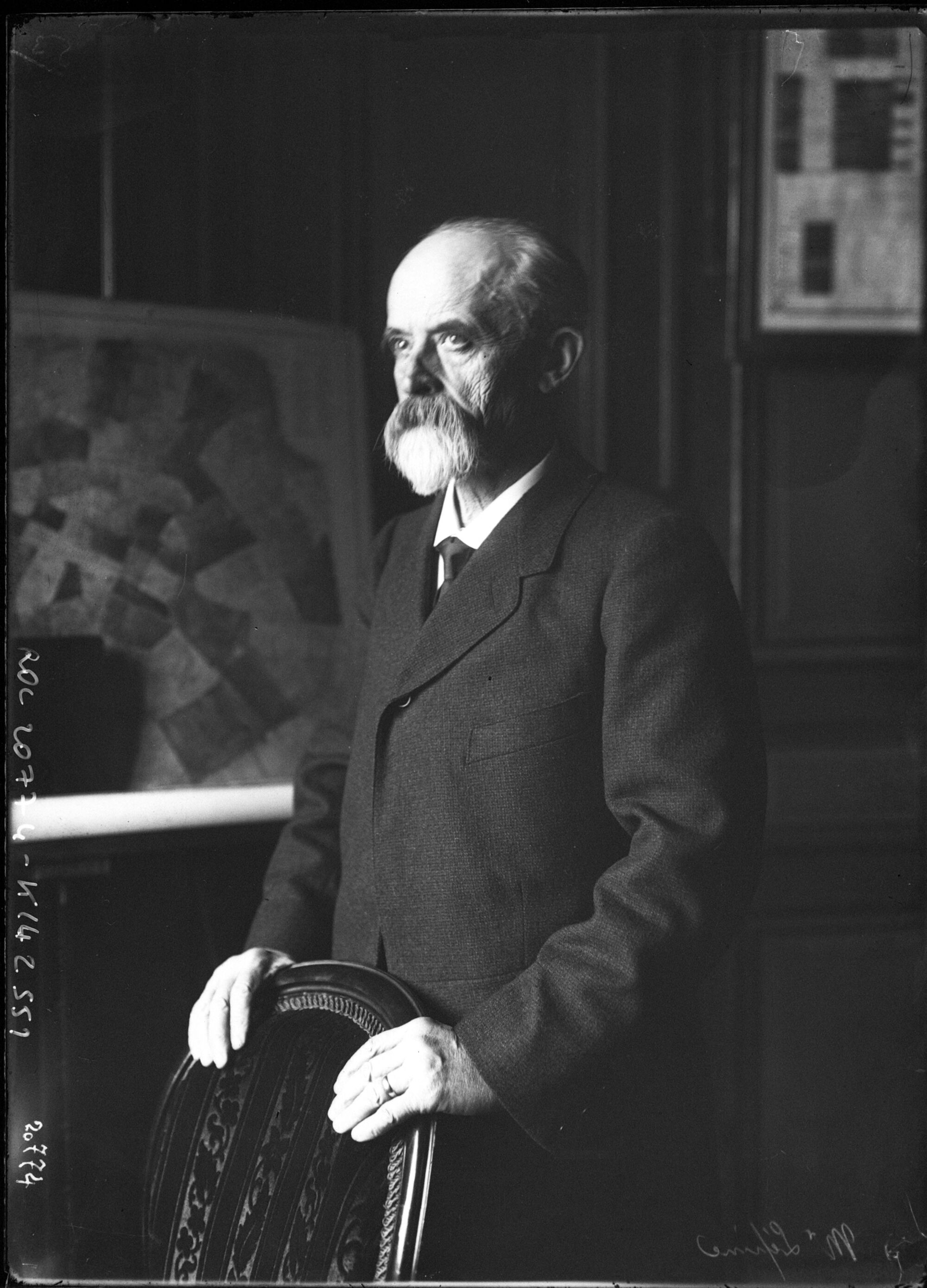
Louis Lépine shortly before his retirement

The theft on August 22, 1911, of the Mona Lisa from the Musée du Louvre was more of an embarrassment to Lépine. Initially, he acted with his usual decisiveness ordering the museum to be closed for a week whilst forensic analysis was carried out. French poet Guillaume Apollinaire came under suspicion; he was arrested and put in jail. Apollinaire tried to implicate his friend Pablo Picasso, who was also brought in for questioning, but both were later exonerated. The real thief was Louvre employee Vincenzo Peruggia, an Italian wishing to return it to Italy. He was caught with the painting in Florence two years later when he attempted to sell it to the directors of the Uffizi Gallery.

=== The defeat of the Bonnot Gang ===
One of Lépine's last successes was the capture and destruction of the notorious Bonnot Gang (La Bande à Bonnot), an anarchist criminal group that operated in France and Belgium during the Belle Époque, from 1911 to 1912. In 1910 Lépine had instigated La Brigade Criminelle a dedicated unit of specialist law enforcers whose purpose was to gather intelligence and take direct action against high-profile criminals. La Brigade Criminelles reputation was established after they were instrumental under Lépine's leadership in destroying the Bonnot Gang. Lépine ordered the leader of the gang Jules Bonnot to be captured on discovering his whereabouts in Paris. The operation began badly when three of his officers were shot during the operation. Lépine then ordered the building to be blown up with dynamite and reputedly administered the final debilitating shot to the head of Jules Bonnot.

=== Concours Lépine ===
Advertisement for the Concours Lépine 1910

The Exposition Universelle provided the catalyst for innovation and Lépine decided to create a competition for inventors that continues to be held annually to this day. It was originally intended to encourage small toy and hardware manufacturers, but over the years it has grown into an annual event that includes a multitude of innovative ideas. The 114th edition of the Concours Lepine Show took place over two weeks in April and May 2015 at the Foire de Paris in the Porte de Versailles. Louis Lépine retired in 1913 and was succeeded by Célestin Hennion. In the same year he was elected a member of the Académie des Sciences Morales et Politiques.

He published his memoirs in 1929, four years before his death in 1933. He was the brother of the Professor Raphaël Lépine, the pioneering physiologist.

== Honors and awards ==
- Grand Cross of the Order of Legion of Honour
- Knight of the Royal Victorian Order

== Bibliography ==
- Louis Lépine Mes Souvenirs, Payot, Paris (1929) (in French)
- Jacques Porot, Louis Lépine : préfet de police-témoin de son temps : 1846-1933, Paris, (1994) (in French)
- Berlière, Jean-Marc (1993). Le Préfet Lépine, vers la naissance de la police moderne. Paris: Denoel. (in French)

== Cultural references ==
- The 4th Arrondissement of Paris contains Place Louis Lépine, the venue for a flower market and appropriately the headquarters of the Prefecture of Police (Préfecture de Police)
- In 1912, the grateful City of Paris authorities commissioned Charles Pillet for a plaque bearing the likeness of Louis Lépine, a copy of which is found at the Musée Carnavalet.
- Paris Commissioner Lépine is a main character in the French crime drama television Paris Police 1900 and its second season follow-up Paris Police 1905. Louis Lépine is portrayed by actor Marc Barbé.
- Lépine is portrayed by Didier Flamand in the 2007 movie The Tiger Brigades.
- An annual contest of useful inventions bearing his name, the Concours Lépine, was founded by Lépine in 1901 to encourage technical innovation. It is still taking place annually after more than 120 years.
