= Lojze =

Lojze is a given name. Notable people with the name include:

- Lojze Bratuž (1902–1937), Slovene choirmaster and composer, killed by Italian Fascist squads
- Lojze Grozde, Slovenian student murdered by partisans during World War II
- Lojze Kovačič (1928–2004), Slovene writer
- Lojze Krakar (1926–1995), Slovene poet, translator, editor, literary historian, and essayist
- Lojze Logar (born 1944), Slovenian painter, graphic artist and professor
- Lojze Peterle (born 1948), Slovenian politician
- Lojze Slak (1932–2011), Slovenian musician
- Lojze Spazzapan (1889–1958), Italian painter from the Slovene community in Italy
- Lojze Ude (1896–1982), Slovenian lawyer, journalist and historian
- Lojze Zupanc (1906–1973), Slovene writer, poet, playwright and journalist

== See also ==
- Loje
- Loze (disambiguation)
