= Musée de la préfecture de police =

Museum in Paris, France

Coordinates: 48.8495°N 2.3482°E

Musée de la Préfecture de Police
- Musée des Collections Historiques de la Préfecture de Police
- Established: 1900
- Location: 4, rue de la Montagne-Sainte-Geneviève, 5th arrondissement of Paris, Paris, France
- Type: Police history museum
- Founder: Louis Lépine

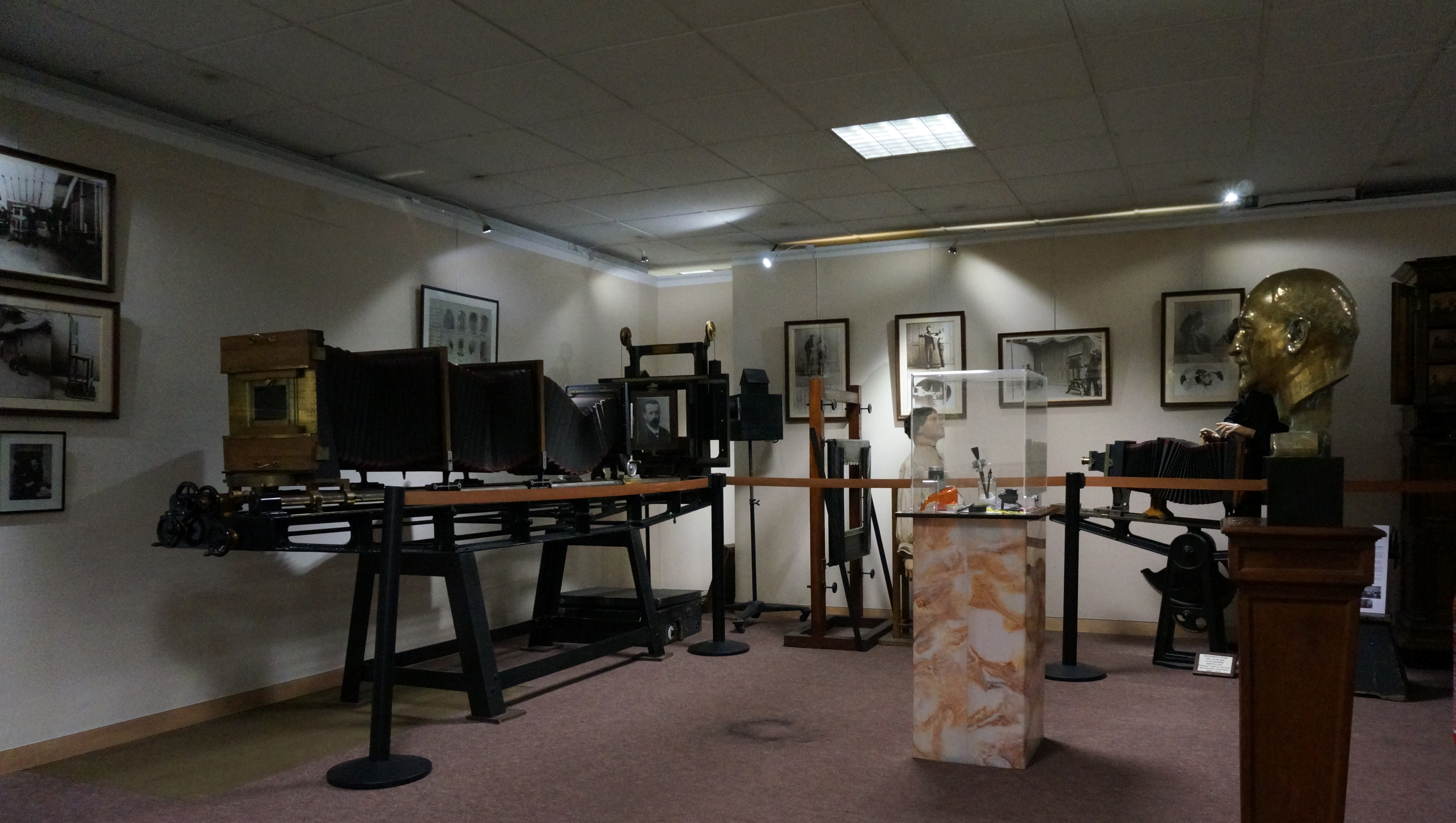
Room dedicated to Bertillon.

The Musée des Collections Historiques de la Préfecture de Police (French pronunciation: [myze de kɔlɛksjɔ̃(z‿)istɔʁik də la pʁefɛktyʁ də pɔlis]), also known as the Musée de la Préfecture de Police ([myze də la pʁefɛktyʁ də pɔlis]), is a museum of police history in the 5th arrondissement of Paris, France. It is located in the Hôtel de police at 4, rue de la Montagne-Sainte-Geneviève. The museum is open daily except Sunday; admission is free.

The museum was originally started by prefect Louis Lépine (1846-1933) for the Exposition Universelle (1900), and has gradually grown through subsequent years. It now contains evidence, photographs, letters, memorabilia, and drawings that reflect major events in the history of France (including conspiracies and arrests), famous criminal cases and characters, prisons, and daily life in the capital such as traffic and hygiene. Exhibits include a guillotine, uniforms, the pistol used in the assassination of Paul Doumer, and relics of the World War II occupation including German machine guns and insignias worn by Jews.

== See also ==
- List of museums in Paris
