= Loze =

Loze may refer to:

== People ==
- Henri-Auguste Lozé, French politician

== Settlements ==
- Lože, Laško, Slovenia
- Loze, Tarn-et-Garonne, Occitanie, France
- Lože, Vipava, Slovenia

== Mountains ==
- Col de la Loze, mountain in the French Alps
- Loze Mountain, Antarctica

== See also ==
- Lojze, a given name
