= Nude model =

Nude model, nude modelling, adult model, or erotic model may refer to:

- Model (art), a model who poses for any visual artist as part of the creative process
- Model (person), a person with a role to promote, display, or advertise commercial products
- Erotic photography model, a model who poses nude for erotic or sensual photos
  - Fetish model, a person who models fetish clothing or devices
- Nude Model (ヌードモデル), 2015 manga one-shot by Tsubasa Yamaguchi

== See also ==
- Depictions of nudity
- Erotic photography
- Glamour photography
  - List of glamour models
- Nude (art)
- Nude photography
  - Fine-art nude photography
- Nudity
