= Sarah Brown (model) =

French artist's model (1869-1896)

Marie-Florentine Royer
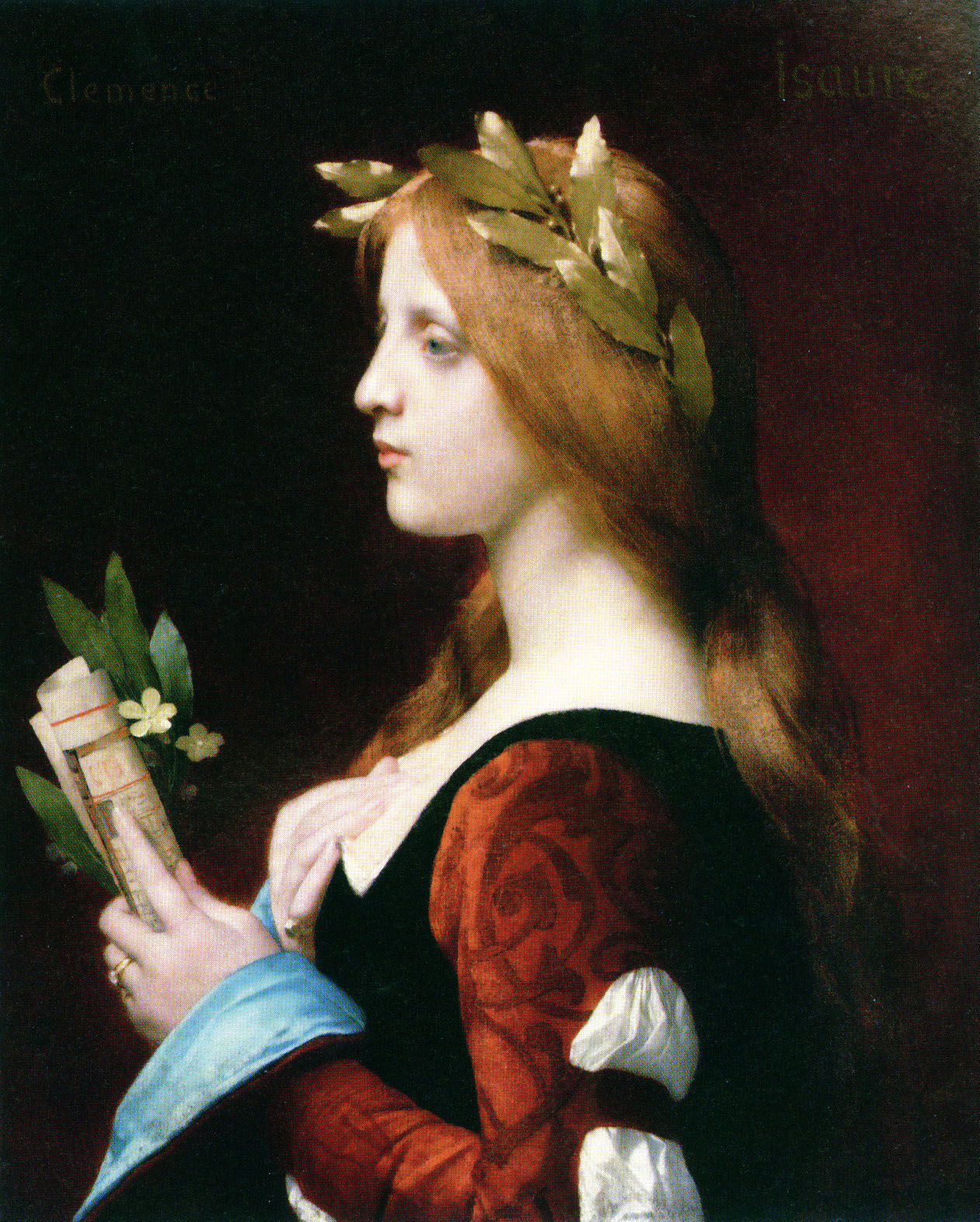
- Sarah Brown Portrait by Jules Lefebvre
- Born: 1869
- Died: 1896 (aged 26–27)

Marie-Florentine Royer (in some sources Roger, 1869-1896), better known by her English-sounding model name Sarah Brown, probably an affectation due to her Celtic-looking long red hair and pale skin, was a French artist's model famous as the "Queen of Bohemia" in 1890s.

Royer's arrest, along with three other well known artists' models for posing scantily clad as part of tableau vivant floats at the 1893 Bal des Quat'z'Arts in Paris' Latin Quarter, provoked one of the most famous student riots of the late nineteenth century.

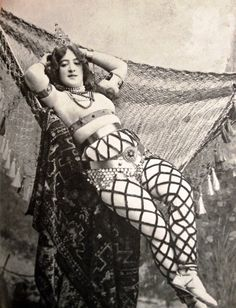
Stage performer Marie Royer AKA Sarah Brown

Royer modeled for Jules Lefebvre, Georges Rochegrosse, and Frederick MacMonnies, among many others. She named as "Lily White" in the autobiography of sculptor Janet Scudder, in which the two women have a confrontation.

Royer settled in 4th arrondissement of Paris where she died aged 27 on 12 February 1896.
