= Gommegnies =

- Commune
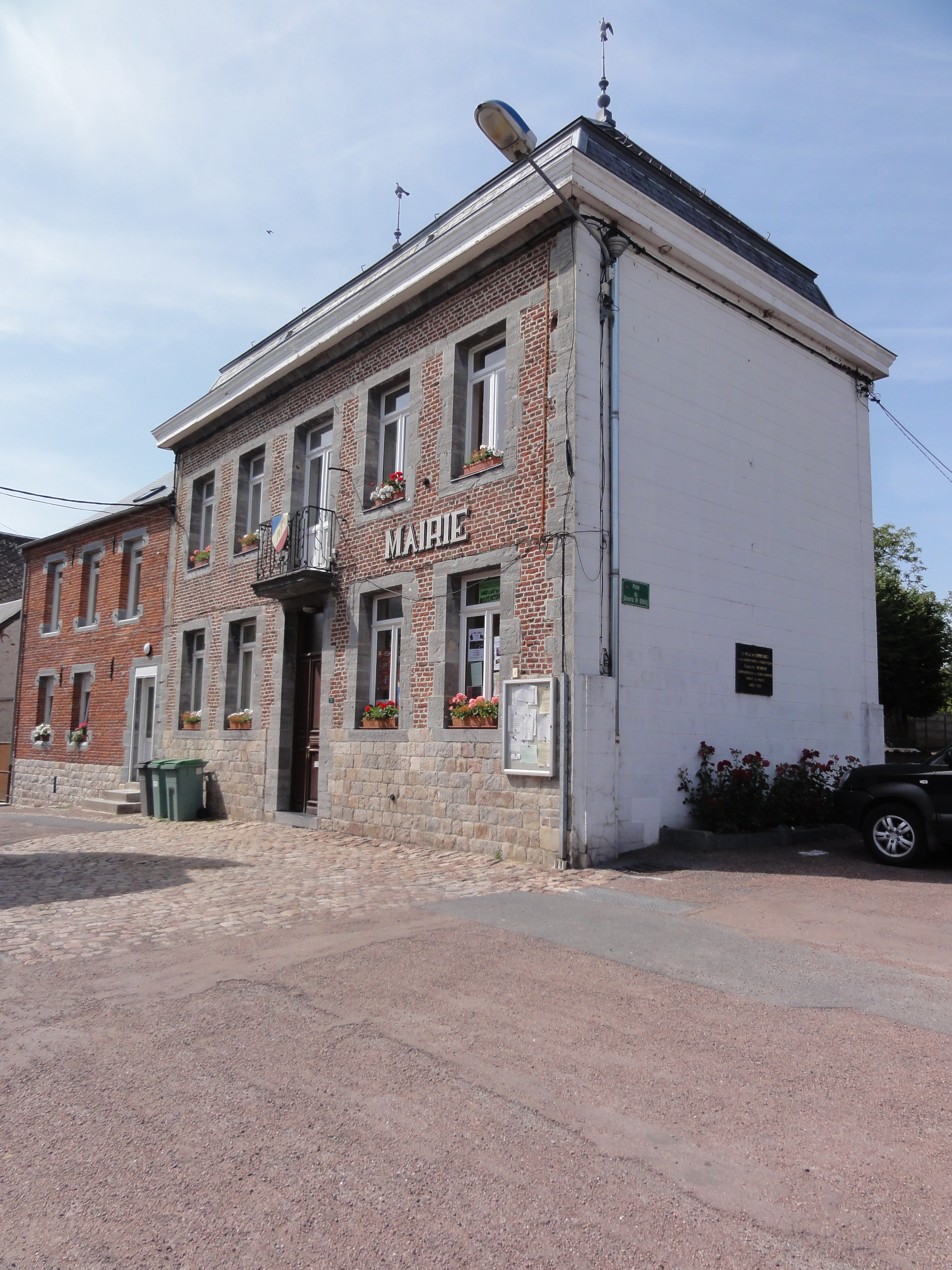
- The town hall in Gommegnies

- Coat of arms
- Location of Gommegnies
- Location within France Location within Hauts-de-France
- Coordinates: 50°16′18″N 3°42′21″E
- Country: France
- Region: Hauts-de-France
- Department: Nord
- Arrondissement: Avesnes-sur-Helpe
- Canton: Aulnoye-Aymeries
- Intercommunality: CC Pays de Mormal

Government
  - Mayor (2020–2026): Benoît Guiost
- Area^{1}: 15.78 km^{2} (6.09 sq mi)
- Elevation: 124 m (407 ft)
- Highest elevation: 152 m (499 ft)
- Lowest elevation: 100 m (330 ft)
- Population (2023): 2,264
  - Density: 143.5/km^{2} (371.6/sq mi)
- Time zone: UTC+01:00 (CET)
  - Summer (DST): UTC+02:00 (CEST)
- INSEE/Postal code: 59265 /59144
- ^{1} French Land Register data, which excludes lakes, ponds, glaciers > 1 km^{2} (0.386 sq mi or 247 acres) and river estuaries.

Gommegnies (French pronunciation: [ɡɔmɲi]) is a commune in the Nord department in northern France.

== Population ==
Historical population
Year	Pop.	±% p.a.
1968	1,929	—
1975	1,878	−0.38%
1982	1,780	−0.76%
1990	2,004	+1.49%
1999	2,002	−0.01%
2007	2,199	+1.18%
2012	2,283	+0.75%
2017	2,301	+0.16%
2023	2,264	−0.27%
Source: INSEE

== Monuments ==
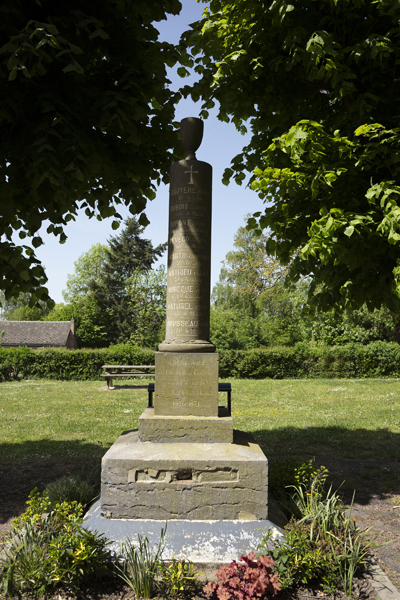
Monument 1870-1871

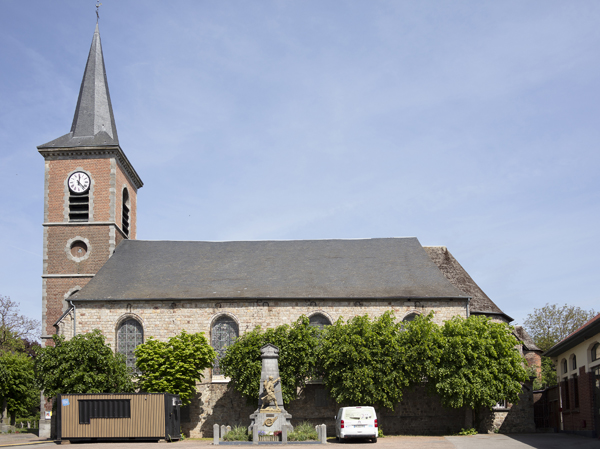
Church (Notre-Dame-de-l'Assomption)

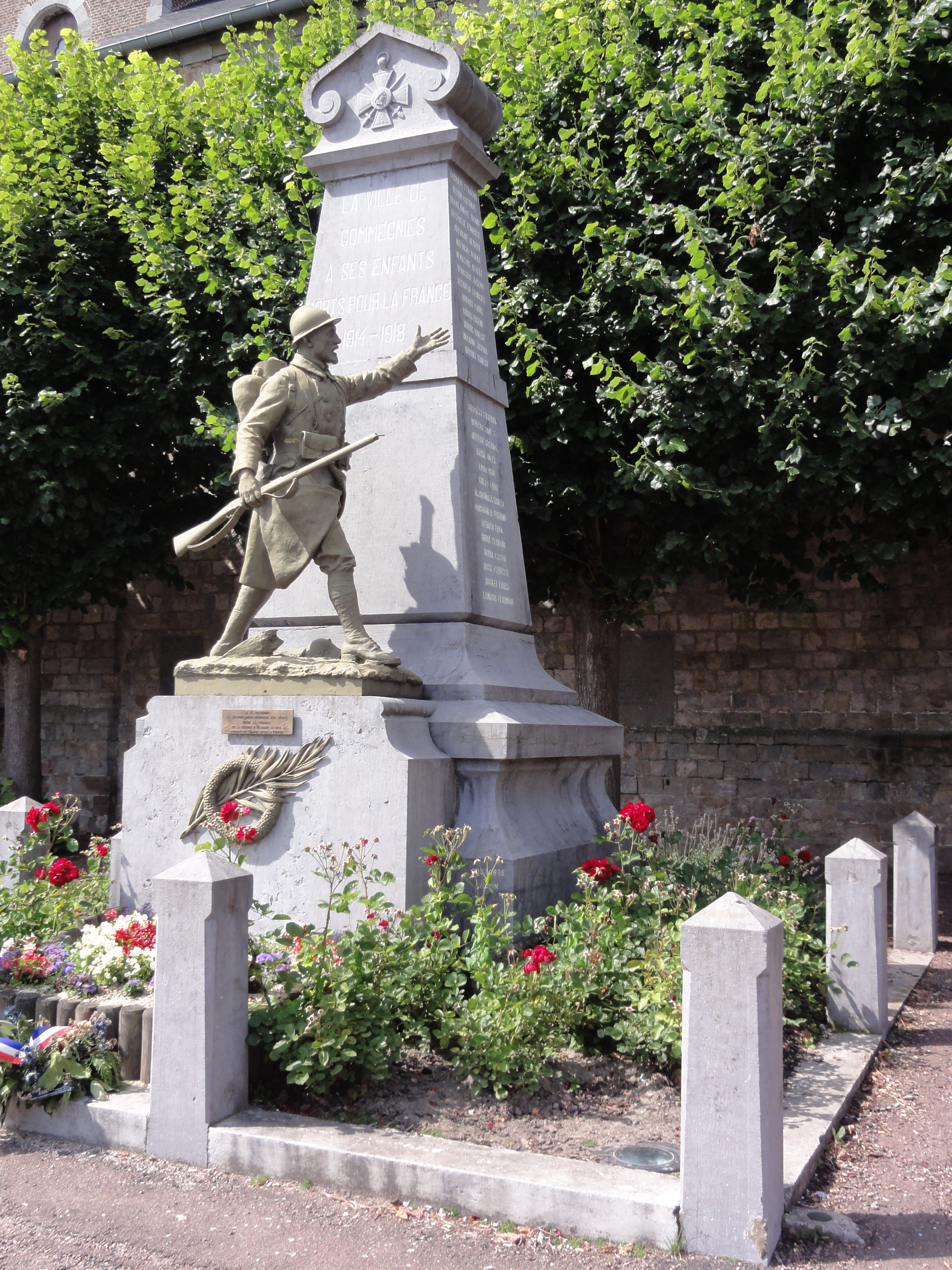
Monument 1914-1918

== See also ==
- Communes of the Nord department
