= Costume party =

Fancy dress party

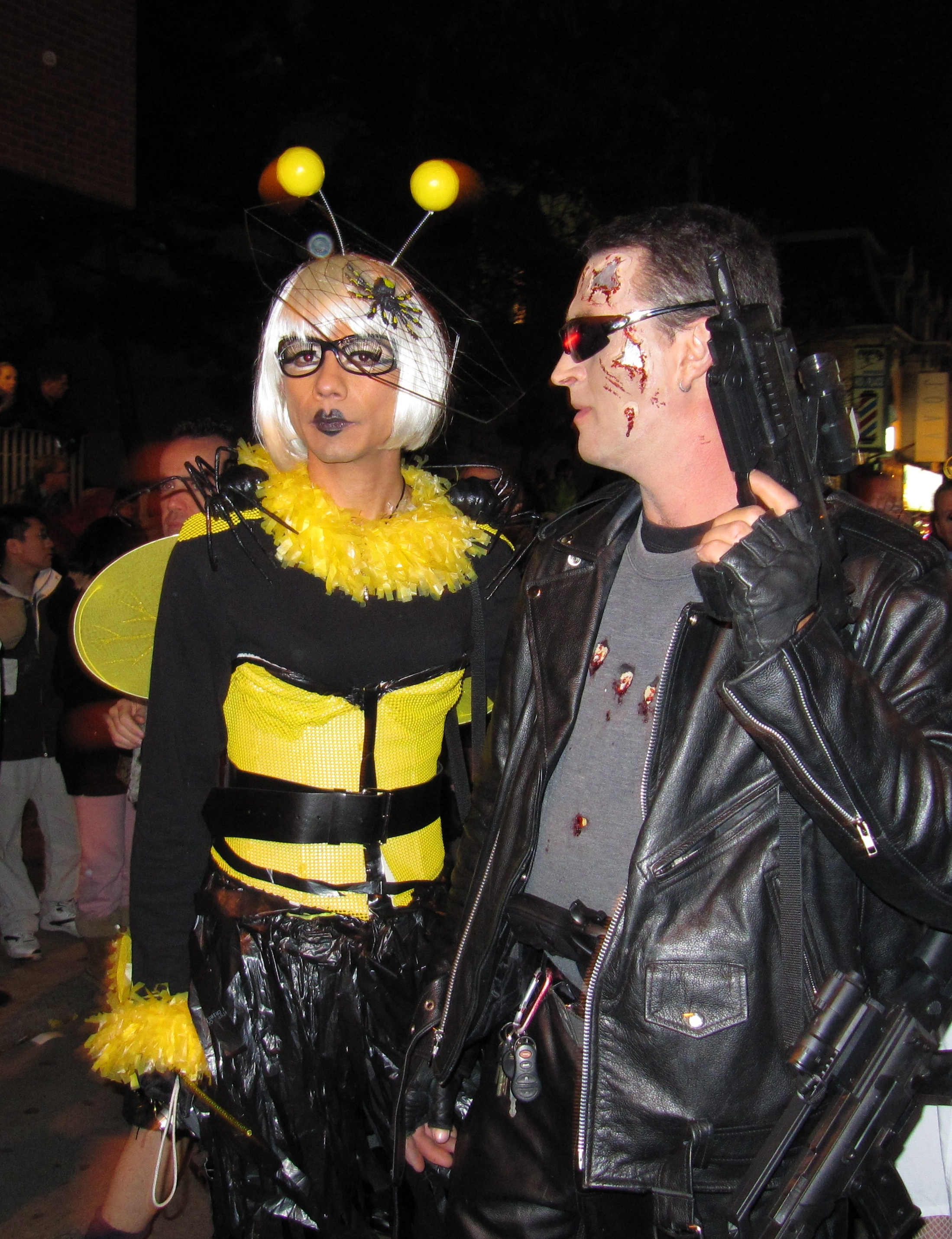
Guests in costumes at a fancy dress party.

A costume party (American English) or fancy dress party (other varieties of English) is a type of party, common in contemporary Anglo culture, in which many of the guests are dressed in costume, usually depicting a fictional or stock character, or historical figure. Such parties are popular in the United States, United Kingdom, Canada, Australia, Ireland and New Zealand, especially during Halloween.

== By country ==
=== Australia ===
Australian fancy dress parties typically follow the style of the United States, and Halloween costume parties have been common since the early 1990s, even though Halloween has not historically been a celebrated event in Australia. Typical events for Australians that involve dressing up are the Sydney Gay and Lesbian Mardi Gras, the staff Christmas party and cricket matches.

One of the oldest examples of fancy dress being worn in Australia is on display at the Western Australia Museum. It was a child's fancy dress costume worn by Rita Lloyd, aged nine, to the ‘Lord Mayor’s Juvenile Fancy Dress Ball’ at Mansion House in Perth on 8 January 1909.

=== Iraq ===
It is a tradition to have a costume party at a university graduation.

=== United Kingdom ===
==== Nineteenth century ====
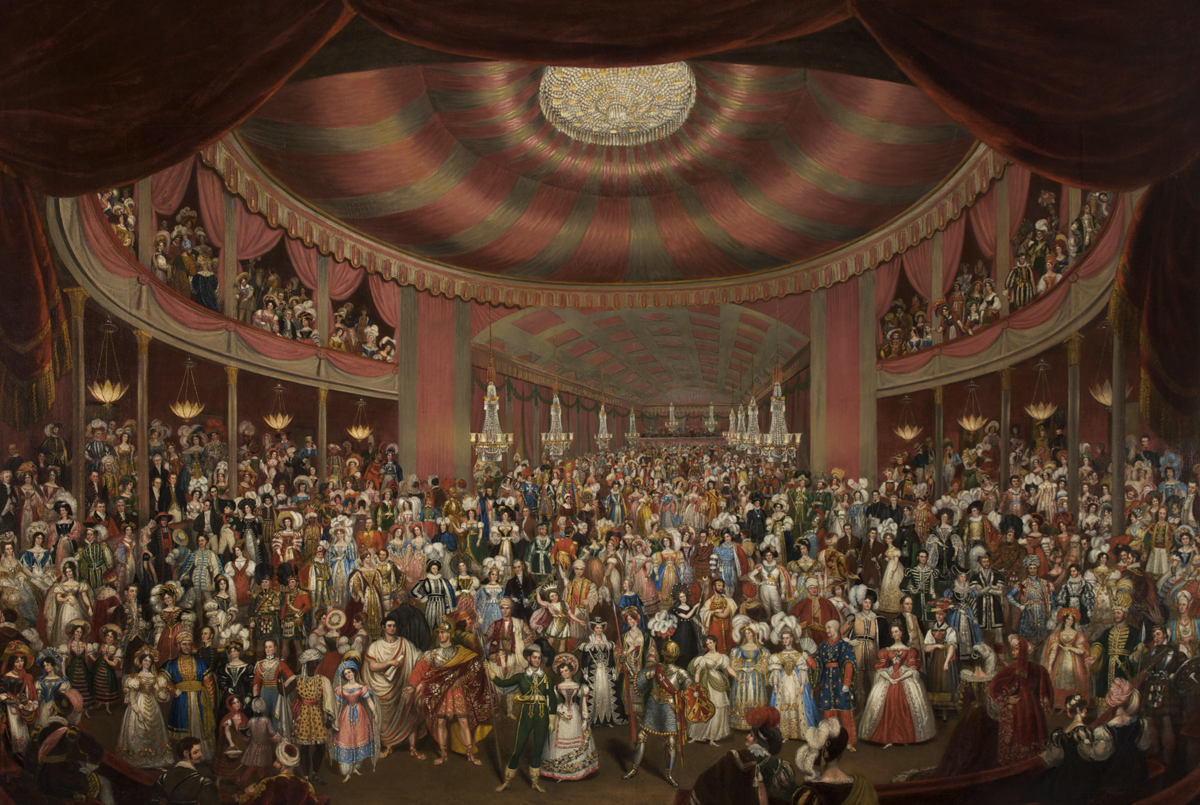
Manchester fancy dress ball of 1828, painting by Arthur Perigal

The origins of fancy dress parties in the United Kingdom can in some respects be traced to masked balls of the 18th century period. In the period to 1850, fancy dress balls were a typical part of the social life of music festivals.

Common costumes of the period were specific historical characters, generic historical or regional clothing, abstract concepts (such as "winter", "starlight" or "night"), and objects (such as "champagne bottle" or "aquarium"). Popular characters included Marie Antoinette and Elizabeth I for women and Napoleon and Robin Hood for men.

==== Twentieth century ====
Notable amongst early events in the 20th century was the Chelsea Arts Club Ball. Such events were often elaborate affairs and for the most part confined to those with considerable means.

Amongst the general population, costume parties also occurred with increasing frequency from the late 1940s onward; for the most part the costumes were simple affairs until the mid-1970s. Prior to the late 1990s, most costumes were either hired or constructed at home. Although 'accessory' items had been available for some time, retail purchased costumes are, in respect of the U.K., largely since in the late 1990s. Many materials and costumes being imported from the Far East (with cost savings in labour and bulk orders) had increased in volume at that time. This has seen the price of purchased costumes becoming more and more affordable.

Coupled with the modern trend in costume parties, 'retro' fashion as a costume theme (such as a 1970s or 1980s fancy dress) is also popular, the costumes to some extent parodying or pastiching the fashions of earlier decades. Amongst the most popular parodied costumes are: Audrey Hepburn (as Holly Golightly), Madonna in her classic stage outfits, and more recently Lady Gaga.

Fancy dress parties are popular year round in the United Kingdom. The 1996 novel Bridget Jones's Diary features the classic British costume party theme "Tarts and Vicars" at which the women wear sexually provocative ("tart") costumes, while the men dress as Anglican priests ("vicars"). Fancy dress parties have been held by the British royal family. Prince William, heir to the British Throne, celebrated his 21st birthday with an "Out of Africa" theme, Princess Beatrice of York chose an 1888 themed party for her 18th birthday, and Lord Frederick ("Freddie") Windsor and his sister Lady Gabriella Windsor, celebrated a joint birthday party with a pre-French Revolution courtly theme.

=== United States ===
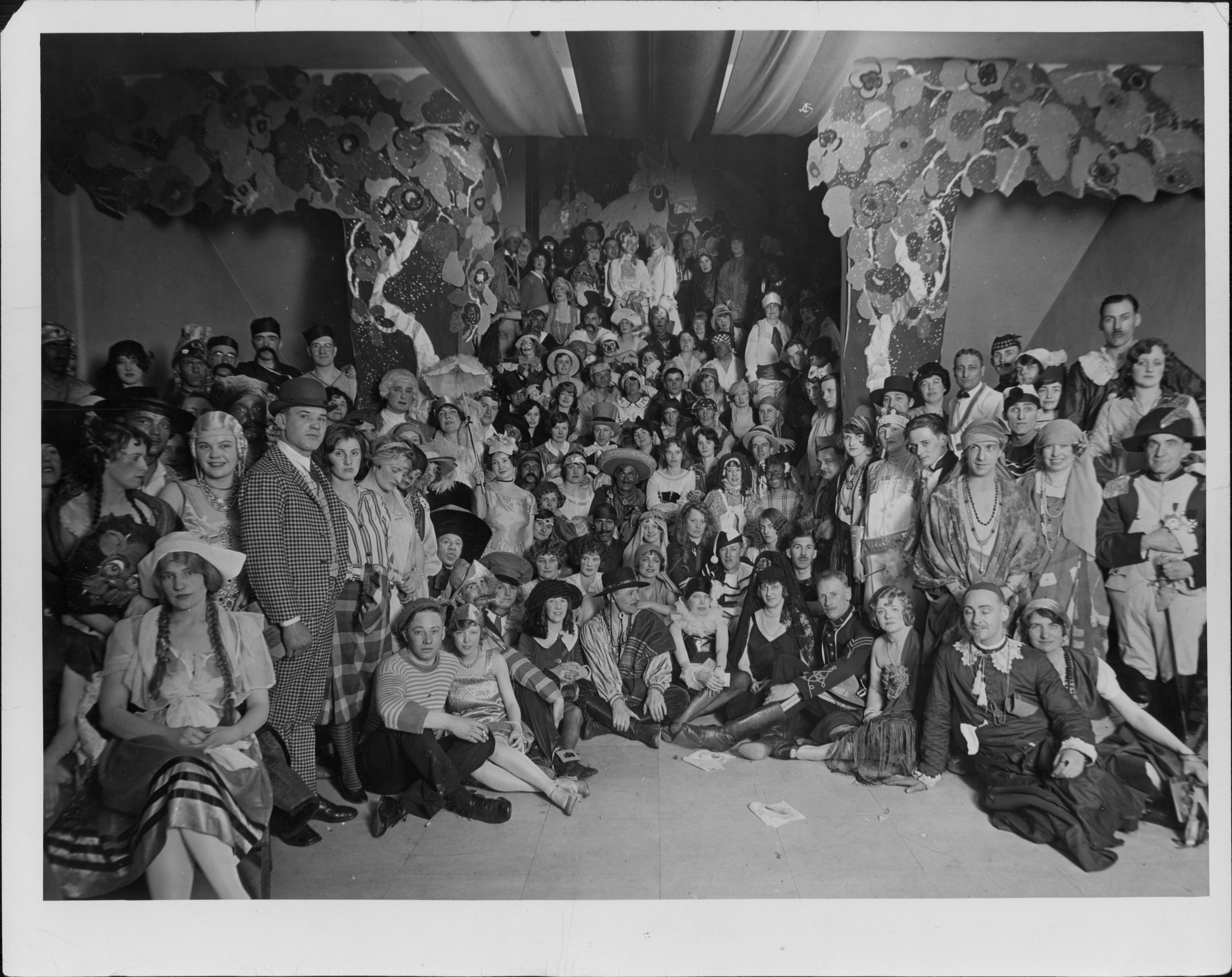
Attic Club members at their annual costume party in Minneapolis, 1927

==== Nineteenth century ====
In late nineteenth century New York, costume parties were popular amongst the affluent. Costumes were typically historical European aristocracy. Authenticity was important, even extending to using actual period elements. For example, Cornelia Bradley-Martin attended her own party, the notorious Bradley-Martin Ball, dressed as Marie Antoinette, wearing jewellery actually owned and worn by Antoinette herself. The choice of aristocratic costume allowed rich Americans, with relatively limited family history, to assume some element of history and legitimacy. This coincides with the celebration of Halloween in the United States during the late nineteenth century. As a reaction to Halloween pranks and vandalism brought to the country by Celtic immigrants, women's magazines introduced a new, middle-class rendition of the holiday that would come to assert women as the dominant celebrants of Halloween throughout the coming decades. It sought to enforce the ideals of white Anglo-Saxon Protestants by encouraging young people to partake in tame, preferably indoor, activities instead, often with a focus on romance. While the middle and upper classes shifted their Halloween celebrations toward these new actives, including costume parties, the poor and immigrant populations of the United States continued to celebrate in the ways that they always had, demonstrating the effect that class differences had on costume parties during this time.

==== Twentieth century ====
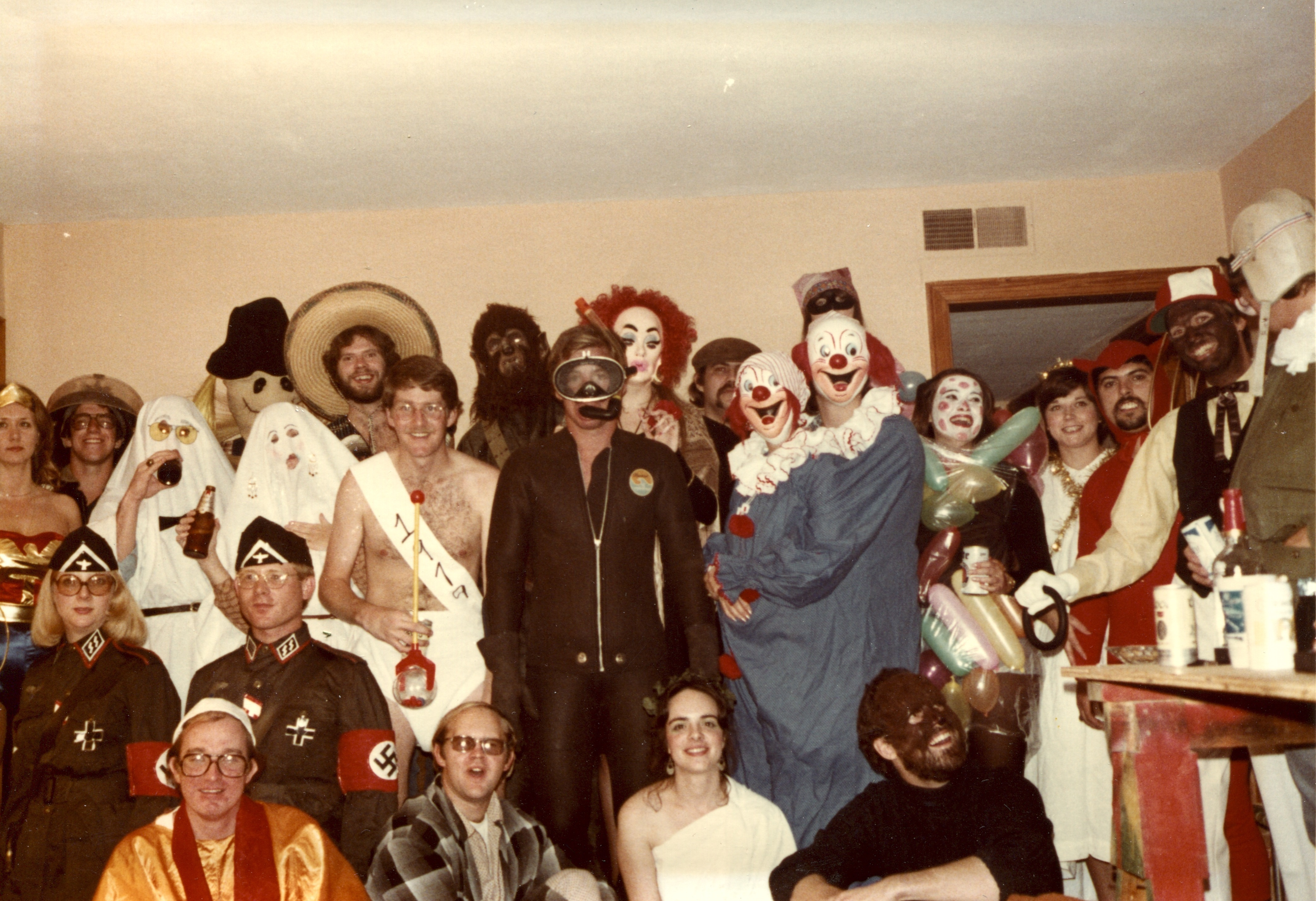
Costumes at a Halloween party in the United States in 1978

Costume parties are especially popular in the United States around Halloween, when teenagers and adults who may be considered too old for trick-or-treating attend a costume party instead. Costume parties are also popular during the carnival season, such as at Mardi Gras.

Attendees occasionally dress in costume for popular science fiction and fantasy events, movie openings and book releases. Web site theonering.net held a The Lord of the Rings dress Oscar party that was attended by Peter Jackson. Star Wars parties were held to celebrate the opening of Star Wars: Episode I – The Phantom Menace. Many bookstores have held Harry Potter themed parties to celebrate the releases of the series' later novels, and some movie theaters have had Potter-themed celebrations as the movie adaptations have been released.

Larger scale 'parties' are often related to organised societies or conventions.

== Fan costuming ==
The hobby of fan costuming and modern cosplay largely developed from the World Science Fiction Conventions (Worldcons), starting with the first in New York in 1939 when two attendees, Forrest J Ackerman and Myrtle R. Douglas, wore "futuristicostumes". From the 2nd World Science Fiction Convention (1940) in Chicago, masquerade balls were a traditional feature of the convention.

=== Conventions ===
Fan conventions, often abbreviated to "cons", of various descriptions have followed the example of the Worldcons with many attendees wearing costumes representing fictional characters. Some conventions feature costume competitions and other scheduled costuming events. Several well-known conventions that feature costuming include San Diego Comic-Con, New York Comic Con, and Atlanta's Dragon Con.

=== Cosplay ===
Cosplay (a blend of "costume" and "play" via the Japanese kosupure (コスプレ)) was coined by Nobuyuki Takahashi in reporting on the 42nd World Science Fiction Convention for Japanese magazine My Anime. It is a performance art in which participants called cosplayers wear costumes, wigs and fashion accessories to represent a specific character. Cosplay is popular at conventions across the world. An example of a major cosplay convention in the United States would be Anime Expo, held annually in Los Angeles, California.

== Events and themes ==
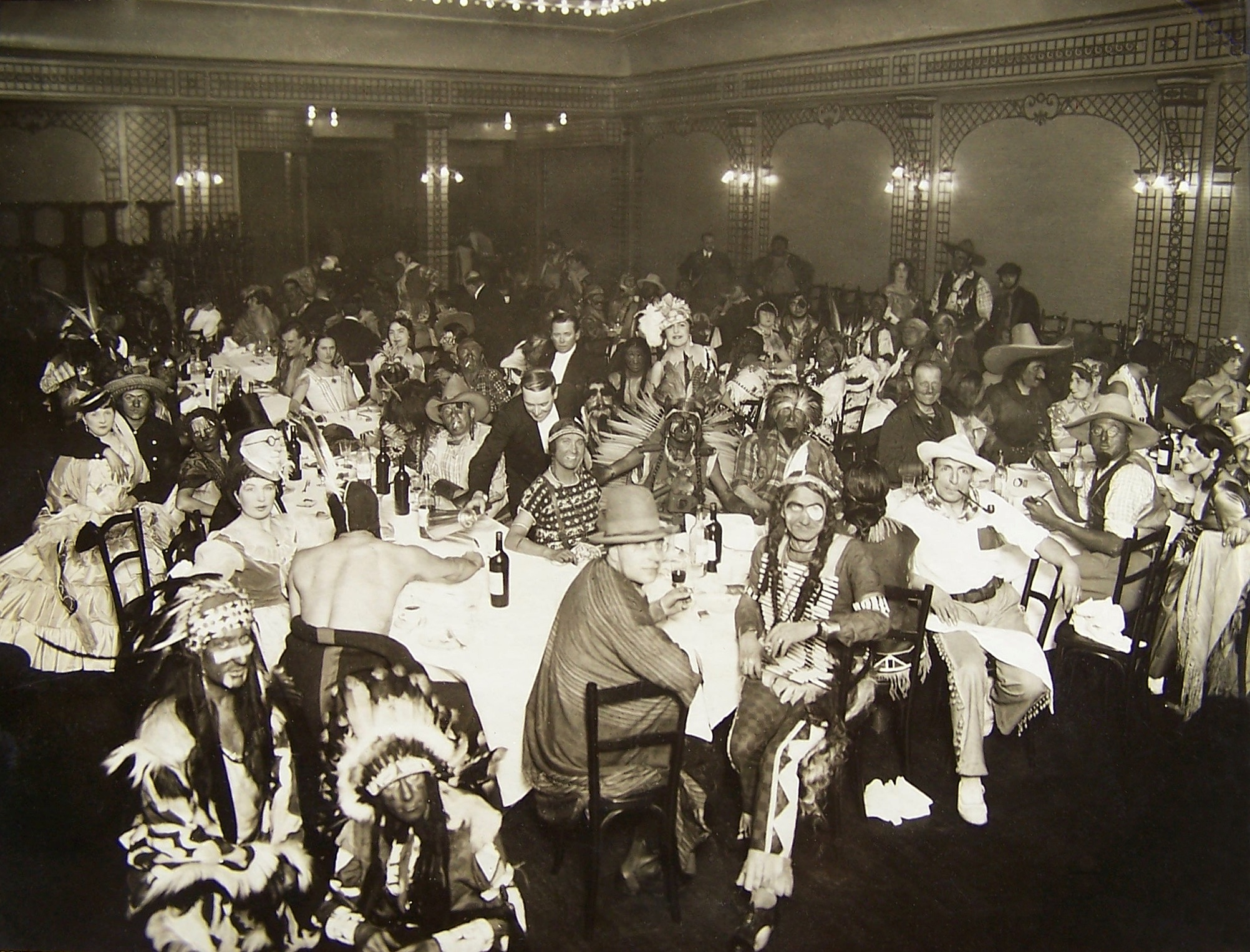
Wild West-themed party in Paris in the 1920s

There are many annual events that generate the chance to dress up in fancy dress costumes: Christmas, New Year, birthdays, hen and stag parties, and World Book Day, amongst others.

Halloween is the most popular costume or fancy dress event of the year in English-speaking countries. Halloween originated centuries ago, the Celts believed that on 31 October the line between the living and the dead became distorted, condemned souls would come back to wreak havoc for the night. In defense, the Celts would dress up in ghoulish costumes to scare evil spirits away.

Within many fancy dress events, a theme is usually present, and with fancy dress outfits often from Hollywood films such as Star Wars, Grease, James Bond, and Spider-Man. Themes are also extremely popular with fundraising events, such as the Great Gorilla Run, where 1,000 people dressed as gorillas in London in aid for Great Gorillas, a charity that focuses on the endangered species.

Some costume parties are themed around 80s fashion. The most popular costumes researched for such fancy dress are the Madonna Look, punk fashion and neon-colored clothing. Some of the easiest and cheapest 1980s costumes include Rambo, Samantha Fox, and Tom Cruise from Risky Business or Top Gun. Alternative eighties costumes include dresses, prom dresses and denim from the period, including high waisted pants and stone wash denim.

Fans sometimes attend sporting events in a costume as a sign of support of their favored team. Some sporting events have large numbers of fans attending in fancy dress costume. Examples include Wellington Rugby Sevens, where almost every fan who attends wears some sort of costume, and San Jose Bike Party, where each month's ride has a different theme encouraging riders to come in costume.

== See also ==
- Halloween costume
- Masquerade ball
- Beaux Arts Ball
- Drag ball
