= Karl Heinrich Christian Bartels =

German internist and pathologist

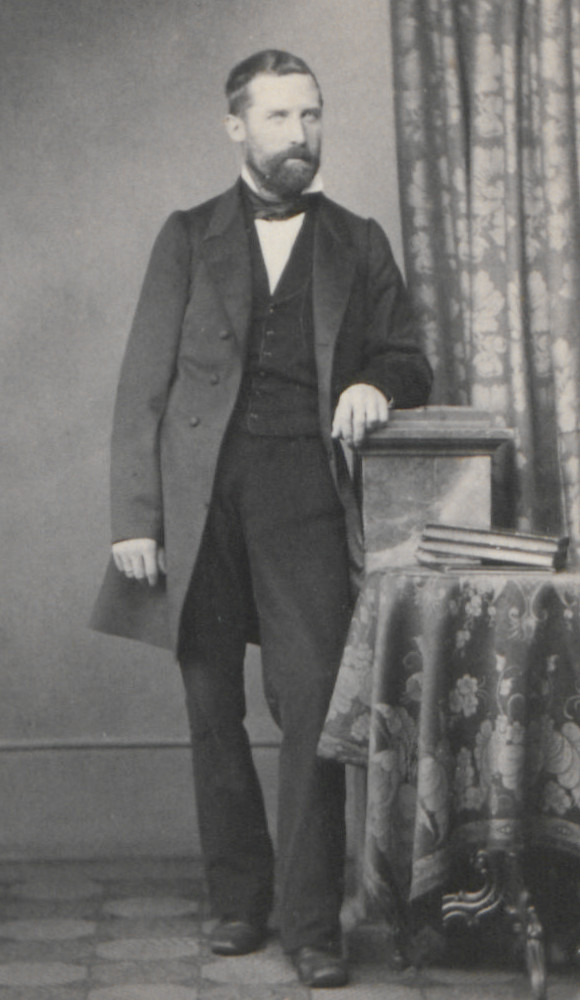
Portrait photo of Karl Heinrich Bartels

Karl Heinrich Christian Bartels (1822 – 1878) was a German internist and pathologist, known for research of kidney disorders.

Bartels was born on 25 September 1822 at Meilsdorf, Duchy of Holstein.

He studied medicine and sciences at the universities of Kiel and Heidelberg, where he was influenced by the work of anatomist Jacob Henle. He served under surgeon Louis Stromeyer in the First Schleswig War, during which, he spent two months in Danish captivity. In 1851 he obtained his habilitation and worked as assistant to Friedrich Theodor von Frerichs at the University of Kiel. From 1853 he spent several months in Vienna, where he studied pathological anatomy and skin diseases. In 1859 he was named a professor of pathology and director of the clinic for medical pathology at Kiel.

He died in June 1878 in Kiel.

== Selected works ==
- De conjugatae verae pelvis introitus mensuris et mensurationibus (dissertation), 1850.
- Klinische Studien über die verschiedenen Formen von chronischen diffusen Nierenentzündungen, 1870 – Clinical studies on the various forms of chronic diffuse kidney infections.
- Handbuch der Krankheiten des Harnapparates, 1875 – Handbook of diseases of the urinary system (considered to be his best work).
