= Bal des Quat'z'Arts =

Art student ball in Paris, 1892–1966

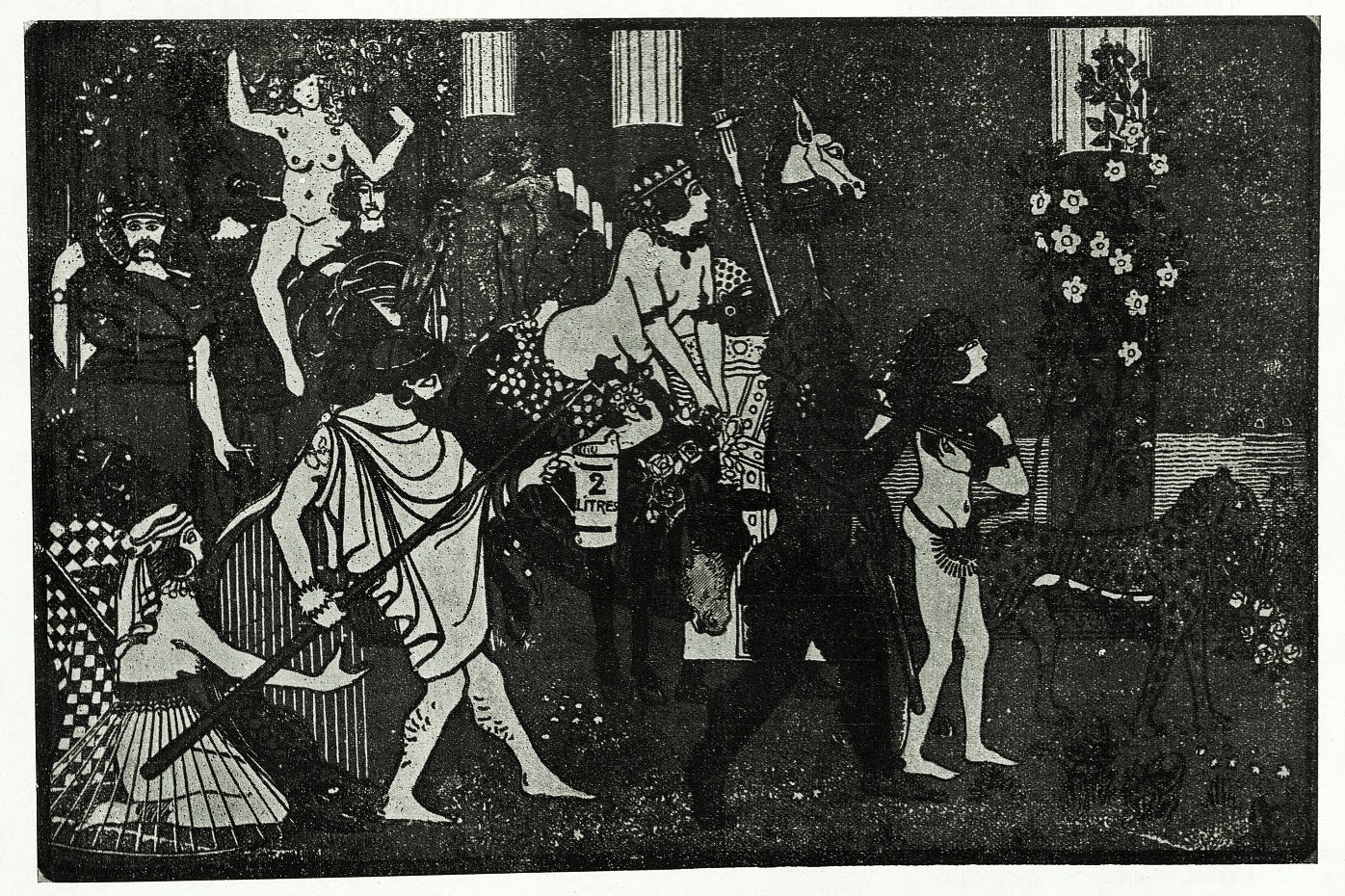
Invitation card for the 1907 ball

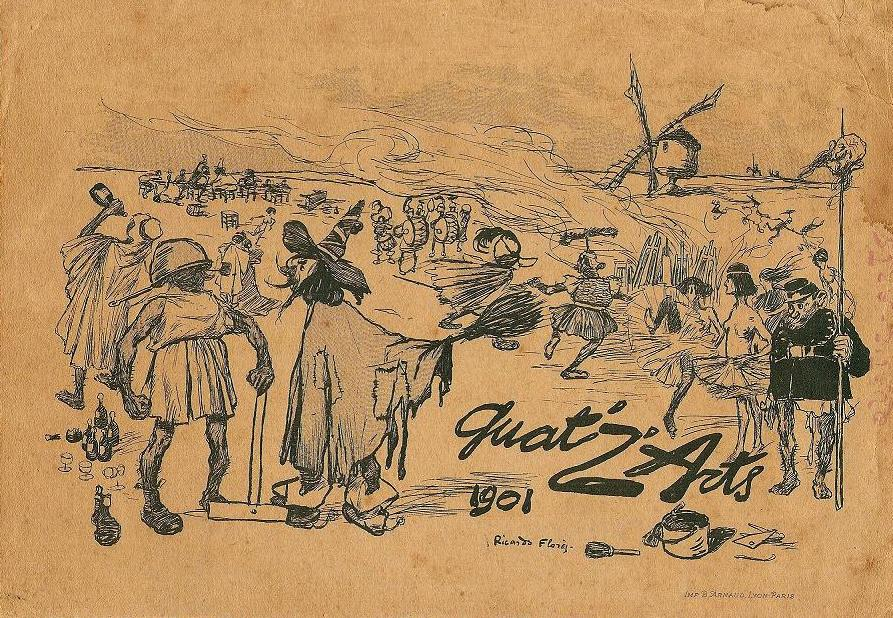
Bal des Quat'Z'Arts (1901)

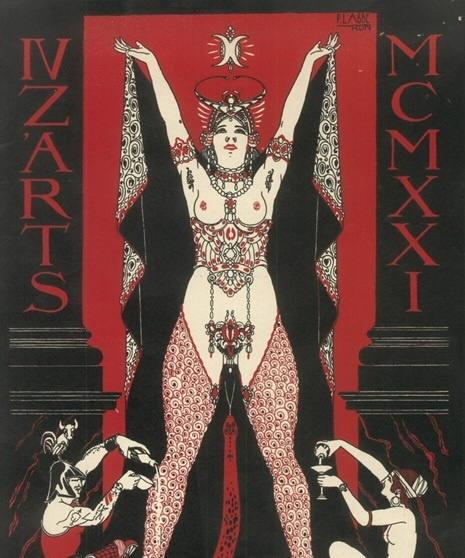
poster for the 1924 Bal des Quat'Z'Arts

Bal des Quat'z'Arts ("Four Arts Ball") was a Parisian annual ball, the first held in 1892 and the last in 1966. The event was organised by Henri Guillaume, Professor of Architecture at the École nationale supérieure des Beaux-Arts.

"Quat'z'Arts" referred to the École des Beaux-Arts' four disciplines (architecture, painting, engraving, and sculpture).

== History ==
The bohemians of Montmartre who modeled their pranks in the form of carnival were instrumental in initiating the Bal des Quat'z'Arts. It was one of the two controversial carnivals of the 1880s and 1890s, the other being the annual masked ball, held in the spring. The carnival was an annual event with different themes. It was held particularly for the students of the four branches of architecture, painting, sculpture, and engraving of the École des Beaux-Arts. It was considered a "riotous Saturnalia". The girls accompanying the students for the carnival painted their bodies and wore costumes over them which would eventually come off during the wild revelry.

The first ball was held in 1892 in Montmartre. It was modest when compared with later ones, and it was considered a success, though it was immediately put into the hands of organizers.

The second event was a costume ball held 9 February 1893 at the Moulin Rouge; along with merriment and drinking. Nude models walked about as living paintings and a nude woman was noted to be standing on a table at midnight. A lawsuit arose thereafter.

Sarah Brown (née Marie or Marie-Florentine Roger or Royer), who posed as an atelier model, was arrested and fined for nudity after the Bal des Quat'z'Arts carnival in 1893. This led to student rioting in the Latin Quarter. Later, when her whereabouts could not be determined, it was conjectured that she had committed suicide.

Cabaret des Quat'z'Arts was founded in December 1893 by François Trombert on the site of the old Café du Tambourin, named after the second annual Bal des Quat'z'Arts.

Starting in 1900, the theme became singular – ancient – drawing on Greece and Homer. The theme was documented in invitations, programs and posters. The 1913 theme was “The Barbarians”, 1914 was Homer's Greece, 1920 was “Ancient Egypt”, 1921 was “Carthage”, and 1927 was “The Khmers”. Badges made of tinplate or bronze were made to identify the members of the committee responsible for organising the ball.

== Preparations ==
Months were spent in the creation of floats and in the costuming of students and models. The favorite wit of the different ateliers was given the task of painting the banner of the atelier, which was carried at the head of the several corteges. Special instructions were issued to the different ateliers while preparations were in progress, such as this one from the ball of 1899:

"Bal Des Quat-z' Arts, Moulin Rouge, 21 April 1899. Doors open at 10 P. M. and close at midnight. The card of admission is absolutely personal, to be taken by the committee before the opening of the ball. The committee will be masked, and comrades without their personal card will be refused at the door. The cards must carry the name and quality of the artist, and bear the stamp of his atelier. Costumes are absolutely necessary. The soldier—the dress suit, black or in color— the monk—the blouse—the domino—kitchen boy—loafer—bicyclist, and other nauseous types, are absolutely prohibited. Should the weather be bad, comrades are asked to wait in their carriages, as the committee in control cannot, under any pretext, neglect guarding the artistic effect of the ball during any confusion that might ensue. A great "feed" will take place in the grand hall; the buffet will serve as usual individual suppers and baskets for two persons. The committee wish especially to bring the attention of their comrades to the question of women, whose cards of admission must be delivered as soon as possible, so as to enlarge their attendance — always insufficient. Prizes (champagne) will be distributed to the ateliers who may distinguish themselves by the artistic merit and beauty of their female display. All the women who compete for these prizes will be assembled on the grand staircase before the orchestra. The nude, as always, is Prohibited!?! The question of music at the head of the procession is of the greatest importance, and those comrades who are musical will please give their names to the delegates of the ateliers. Your good-will in this line is asked for—any great worthless capacity in this line will do, as they always play the same tune, "Les Pompiers!" The Committee—1899."

== Description ==
The four different ateliers each created various floats and corteges. Prizes were given for the most successful interpretations. A jury composed of painters and sculptors reviewed the costumes as each person entered the ball. If someone did not achieve the appropriate artistic standard, they were turned away. Tickets were not transferable. It was difficult for someone who was not an enrolled student in one of the four ateliers to enter the ball. The ball featured a procession of moving tableaux. When dawn approached the students formed a huge circle to watch the dancing that began in the morning hours. When the dance ended, there would be a shout, "Long live the Quat'z' Arts!" The ball closed at about seven in the morning. It was followed by a procession through the Latin Quarter, finally reaching the Louvre where a general romp would occur. The march would resume over the Pont du Carrousel, until the Théâtre de l'Odéon was reached, where the attendees would disband.

== Modern revival ==
In 2012 the Bal des Quat'z'Arts was revived on the initiative of Nicolas Bourriaud when director of the École des Beaux-Arts.
