= Henri-Auguste Lozé =

French politician

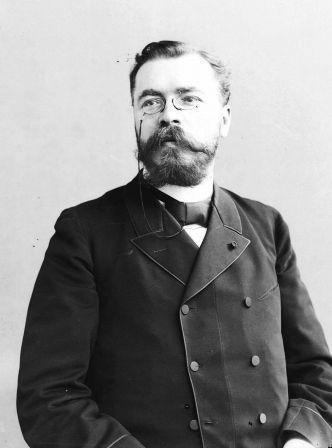

Préfet de Police
- In office 10 March 1888 – 11 July 1893
- Preceded by: Léon Bourgeois
- Succeeded by: Louis Lépine

Ambassadors of France to Austria
- In office November 1893 – September 1897
- Preceded by: Albert Decrais
- Succeeded by: Frédéric Guéau de Reverseauxe de Rouvray, Marquis de Reverseauxé

Governor General of Algeria
- In office 28 September 1897 – 1 October 1897
- Preceded by: Jules Cambon
- Succeeded by: Louis Lépine

Personal details
- Born: 20 January 1850 Le Cateau-Cambrésis
- Died: 26 January 1915 (aged 65) Paris

Henri-Auguste Lozé was a French politician who was Prefect of Police (Préfet de Police) for Paris from 1888 to 1893, a Fédération républicaine member of the National Assembly (French: Assemblée nationale) of the third republic (French: La Troisième République), from 1902 to 1906 and a member of the Senate (Sénat) from 1906 to 1915.

== Biography ==
Henri-Auguste Lozé was born in Le Cateau-Cambrésis in the Nord department near the French border with Belgium. His father is described as an industrialist and mayor. He studied law at Collège Sainte-Barbe and embarked on a career as a lawyer and public administrator that took in provincial postings that included deputy prefectures at Commercy, Béthune and Brest between 1877 and 1884. He was appointed prefect of Cantal in south central France on 5 October 1884.

== Préfet de Police 1888 - 1893 ==
Lozé served from 1886 to 1888 as Préfet de la Somme and from 1888 until 1893 held the politically charged post of Préfet de police de Paris succeeding the future Prime Minister of France Léon Bourgeois. The relationship between the Paris police and the general populace during his period of office was one of mutual disrespect and Lozé’s tenure did very little to change this perception although in 1890 there was a notable success in the discovery and destruction of a Russian nihilist plot to assassinate Alexander III of Russia. In April 1891, under orders from the Minister of the Interior, Lozé seized and destroyed hundreds of posters considered to be a violation of public decency. Many artists and their printers were charged. Several of Alfred Choubrac's posters were prohibited and he was brought to court along with the printers.

When in 1893 major riots broke out in Paris after a confrontation between a student called Nuger and a policeman that resulted in Nuger suffering a fatal wound, (Note: Riots that took place in July 1893 arose out of a seemingly trivial incident involving the arrest of an actress Sarah Brown, a student called Nuger and a confrontation with a policeman, the consequence of which was the death of Nuger. On the following Monday, 1,000 demonstrators marched onto the Chamber of Deputies, determined to be provided with an adequate explanation. By the end of the day barricades were erected around the district of the Boulevard St. Germain and Paris seemed on the brink of revolution.) there was widespread public concern that the governance of Paris and ultimately the French Republic was being endangered by the increasing public disorder in the Capital. Lozé was heavily criticised for perceived inaction during the disturbances and on 11 July he was replaced as Prefect of Police by the authoritarian Louis Lépine who is credited with restoring order and subsequently implementing the reforms required for policing a Modern French state.

== Political career ==
Lozé was next appointed France’s ambassador to Vienna a position he held for four years until 1897. In September of that year he served as the temporary Governor-General of Algeria but though he was named in the post he declined to take the job on a permanent basis preferring a low key post in the Ministry of the Interior. He was replaced in Algeria once again by Louis Lépine.

By 1902 Lozé was representing the Commune of Cambrai in the National Assembly. His political actions during this period were compatible with a man of libertarian and liberal inclinations. He is recorded as opposing the lien securities that favoured distillers and speaking in favour of increased decentralisation of powers to the communes. On 3 July he voted against the bill separating the church from the state.

In 1906 after a close fought election Lozé was elected to the Senate where he served until his death in 1915. Lozé was a Commander (Commandeur) of the Legion of Honour
