= Caserne de la Cité =

Public building in Paris

Coordinates: 48.8544°N 2.3468°E

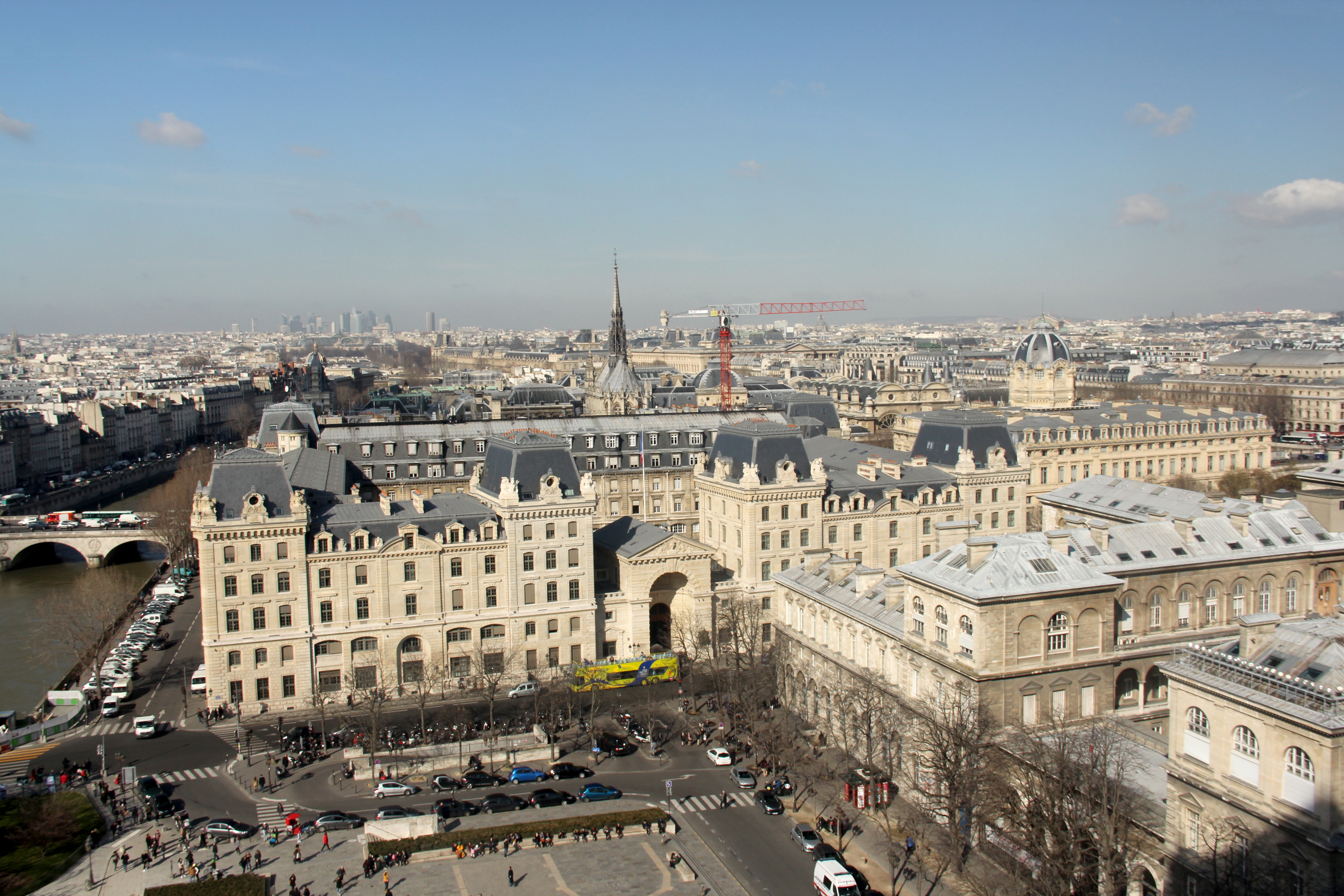
Caserne de la Cité viewed from Notre-Dame de Paris, also showing the Hôtel-Dieu in the foreground, Tribunal de Commerce on the right, and Palais de la Cité in the background

The Caserne de la Cité (lit. 'City Barracks') is a public building on the Île de la Cité, Paris, France, on a prominent site facing Notre-Dame. It has been the seat of the Paris Police Prefecture since 1871.

Originally a barracks and headquarters erected in the 1860s for the National Guard (French: garde nationale de Paris), it has also hosted units of the Republican Guard (garde républicaine) from 1871 to 1929 and the headquarters of the Paris Fire Brigade (brigade des sapeurs-pompiers de Paris, a military unit that reports to the Police Prefect) from 1867 to 1938.

The building played a prominent role during the liberation of Paris in August 1944, when it served as a bastion and command center of the Resistance and the site of the formal surrender of German forces.

== History ==
=== Site and background ===
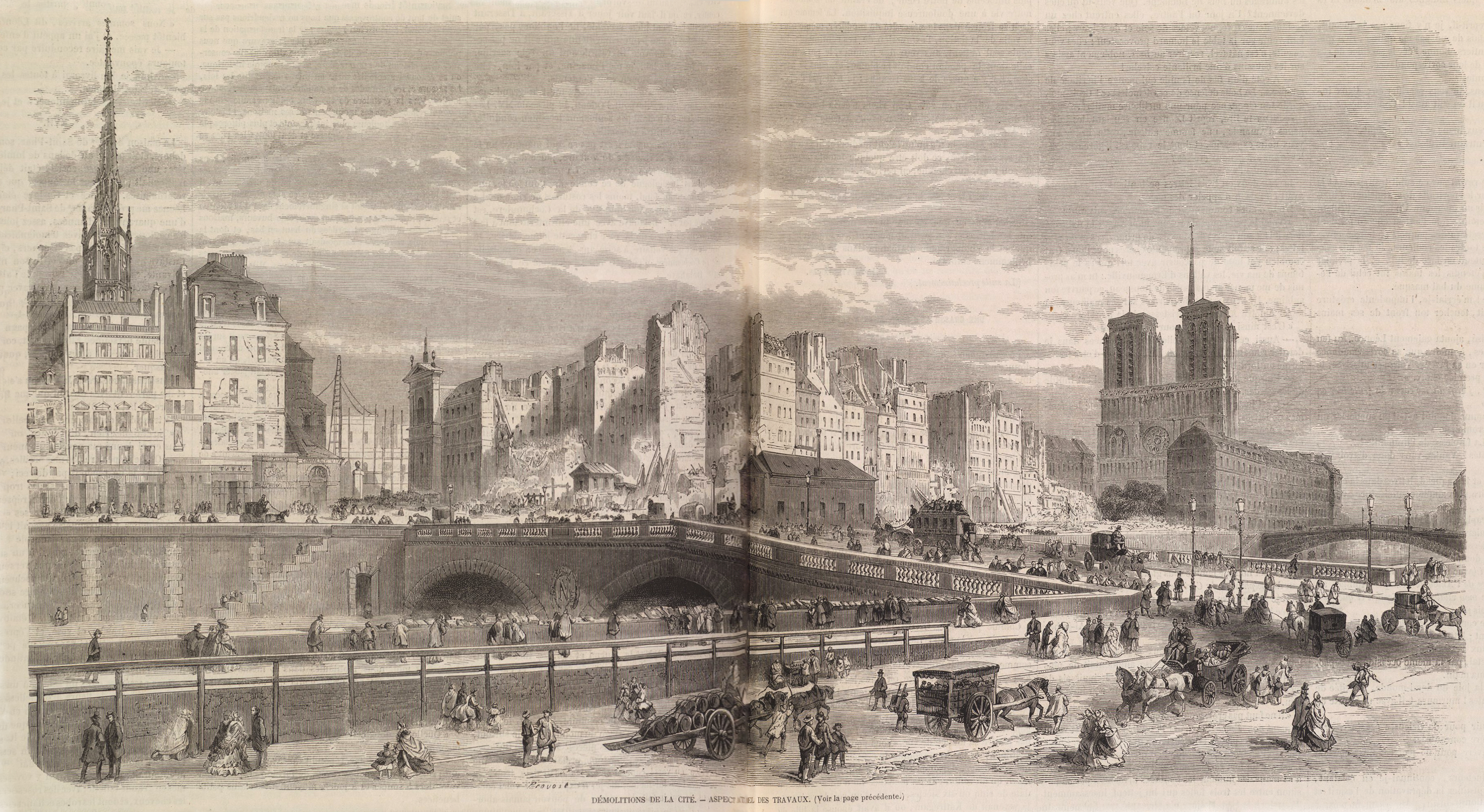
Demolition of old buildings to make space for the Caserne de la Cité, 1862

The Caserne de la Cité occupies most (though not all) of a quadrangular city block bordered by the present-day Boulevard du Palais to the west, Rue de Lutèce to the north, Rue de la Cité to the east, and Quai du Marché-Neuf-Maurice-Grimaud to the south. Like much of the Île de la Cité, it was an ancient and densely built cityscape until comprehensive demolitions were undertaken during the Second French Empire to erect iconic government buildings, a key part of the transformation of Paris led by Georges-Eugène Haussmann.

Prominent buildings on that site had included two religious landmarks: the church of Saint Éloi, originally a monastery dedicated to Saint Martial by court advisor Eligius (French: Éloi) in the 7th century, on the northwestern corner of the block; and towards the southeastern corner, the church of Saint-Germain-le-Vieux, originally a chapel dedicated to John the Baptist that took its name after sheltering the remains of Germain of Paris during the siege of Paris in 885–886. Both churches were rebuilt multiple times during their long existence. Saint-Germain-le-Vieux was eventually demolished in the late 1790s whereas Saint-Eloi, which the Archbishop had granted to the Barnabites in 1631, served as a state warehouse following the French Revolution. It was demolished in 1862, together with the rest of the neighborhood, but its façade, originally erected in 1703 on a design by architect Jean-Sylvain Cartaud, was carefully disassembled and rebuilt in 1863 under architect Victor Baltard's supervision as the new front of the Rive Droite church of Notre-Dame-des-Blancs-Manteaux.

=== Second Empire ===
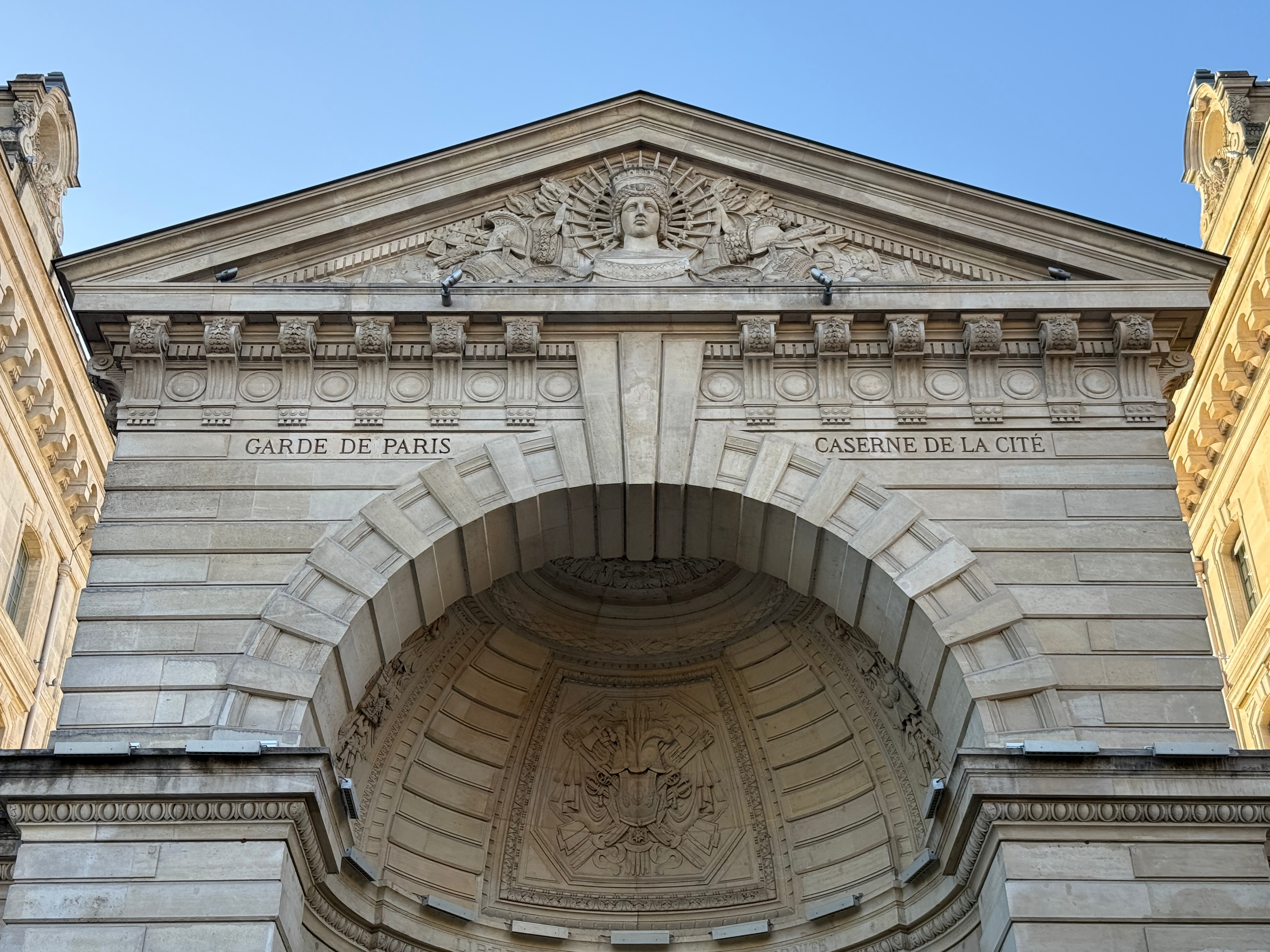
Sculptures above the building's main entrance on rue de la Cité, with the inscription "GARDE DE PARIS - CASERNE DE LA CITÉ"

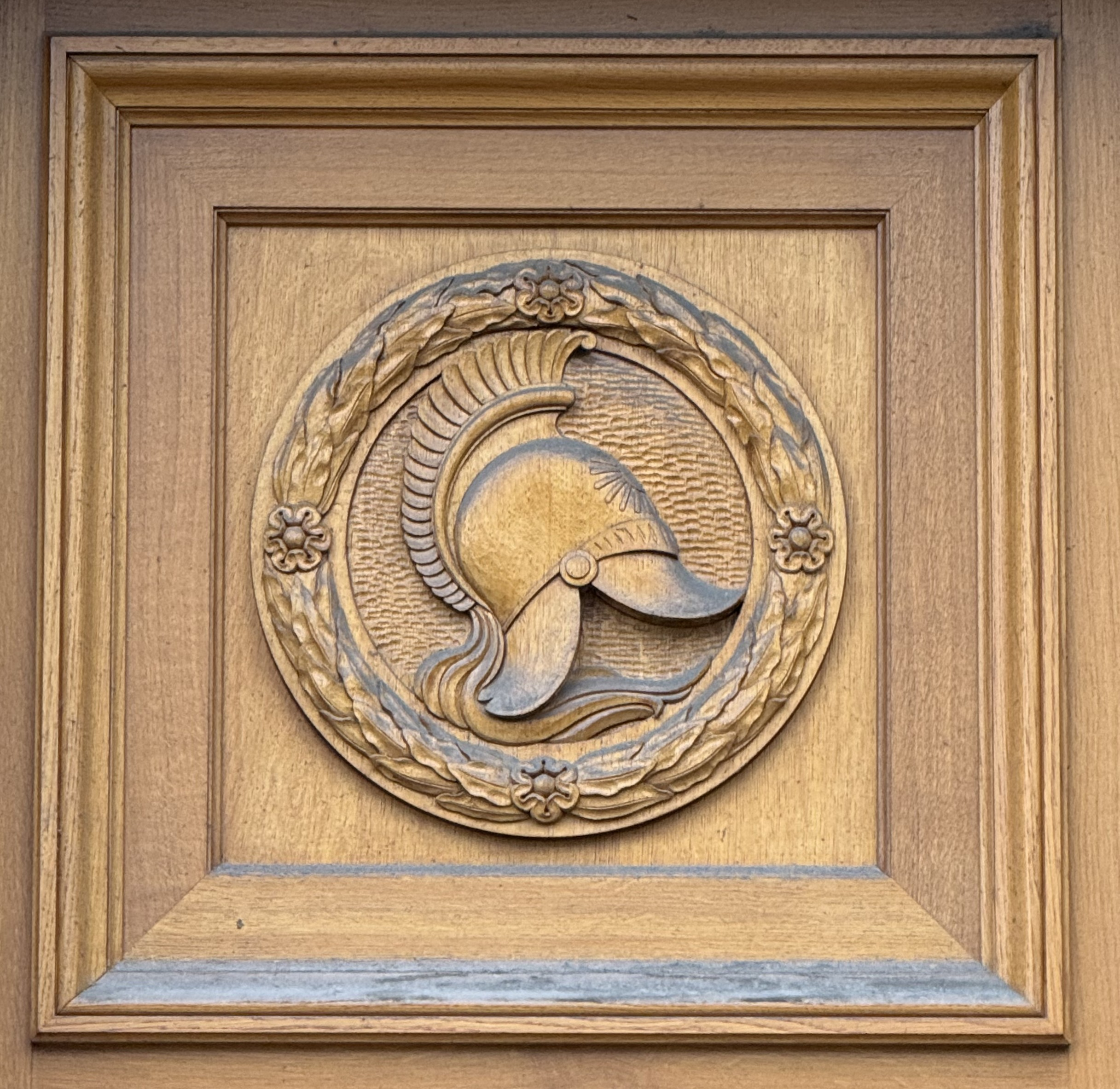
Ceremonial helmet of the National Guard, 1860s sculpture on a wooden door facing rue de la Cité

The Caserne de la Cité was erected between 1863 and 1867, primarily to house troops of the Garde Nationale de Paris, which in 1849 had been integrated into the National Gendarmerie. It was a key component of a network of barracks to control the Paris populace that also included those in the expanded Louvre Palace, the Caserne Napoléon and Caserne Lobau behind the Hôtel de Ville, and the Caserne du Château-d'Eau on Place de la République.

The complex was designed by architect Pierre-Victor Calliat. It consists of two parts, separated by a closed north-south alleyway. On the eastern two-thirds of the block, the barracks of the Garde Nationale was organized as a large-scale quadrangle, with a monumental entrance on Rue de la Cité. On the western side were two urban mansions, each with its own courtyard and portal on Boulevard du Palais, bookended on both sides by apartment buildings filling the block's southwestern and northwestern corners. The two mansions hosted the respective headquarters of the Garde at No. 7 (north) and of the Paris Fire Brigade at No. 9 (south), the latter a relocation from its previous headquarters at Rue Chanoinesse into which it had moved in 1853.

=== Third Republic ===
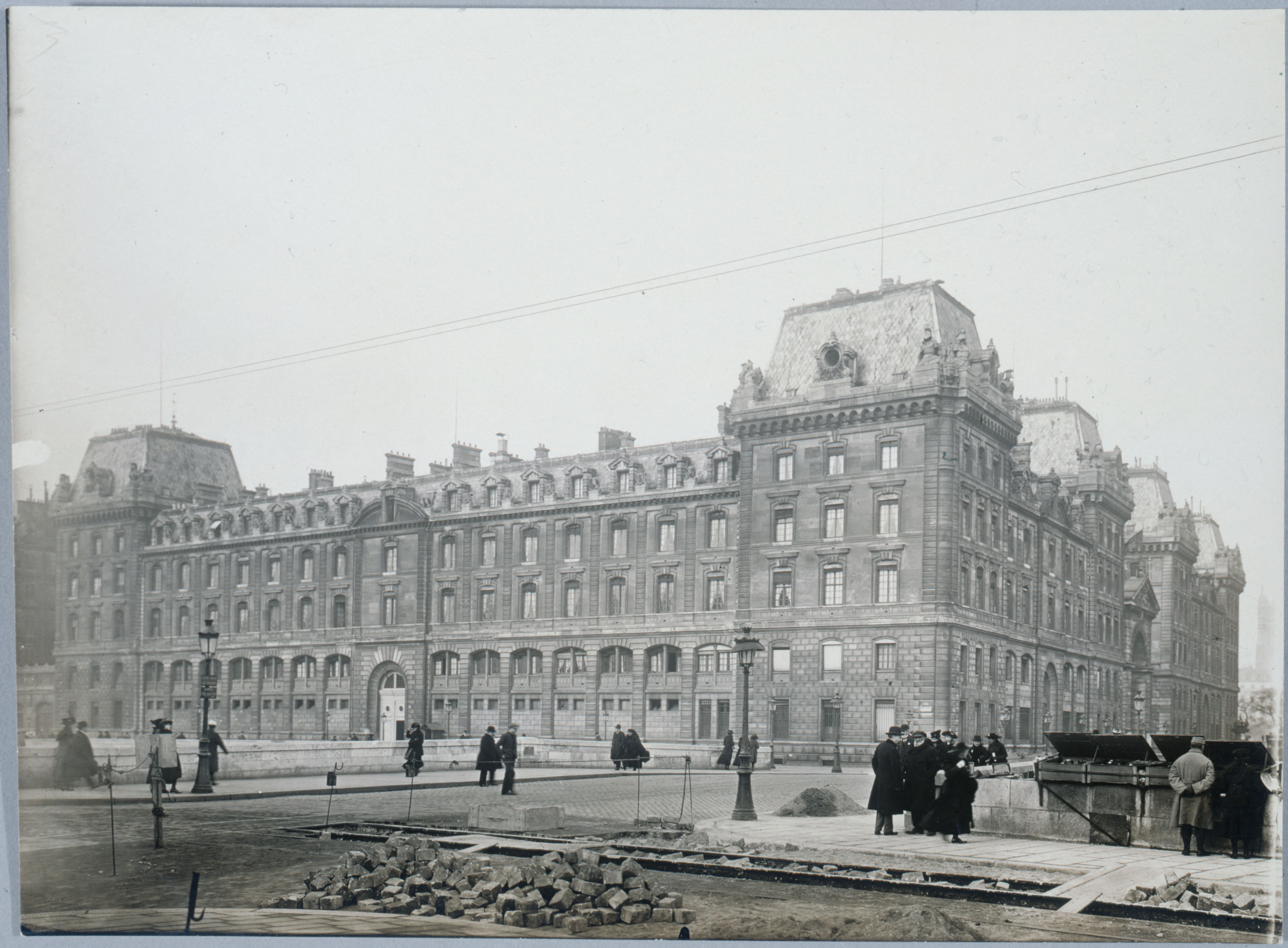
Caserne de la Cité, photographed in 1917

The Caserne de la Cité became the seat of the Paris Police Prefecture as an immediate consequence of the Paris Commune. Before then, the Police Prefecture had been located since 1816 in dependencies of the Palais de la Cité, then moved in 1856 into the old buildings of the Rue de Harlay on the eastern side of Place Dauphine as the Palais underwent reconstruction. The reconstruction project earmarked spaces for the Police Prefecture on the new building's southwestern corner bordering Quai des Orfèvres; much of the Police Prefecture's operations relocated to that new facility in 1870, but it was destroyed by fire at the end of the Commune on 24 May 1871. Jules Ferry, then the mayor of Paris, thus had to find a new home for the powerful police department.

The Police Prefecture was initially directed to relocate in the recently rebuilt section of the Hôtel-Dieu, but eventually moved into the former headquarters of the Guard at 7 boulevard du Palais. The thus evicted Republican Guard, which had replaced the Garde Nationale following the Commune, rented its own headquarters in a building at 31, quai de Bourbon on the nearby Île Saint-Louis, where it remained until the completion of the Caserne des Célestins in 1905. Units of the Republican Guard remained in the main barracks building, but the Police Prefecture increasingly encroached on them with a view to use the entire facility. To that aim, the Seine Department, the parent jurisdiction of the Police Prefecture, purchased the Caserne de la Cité from the City of Paris in late 1878.

On 30 July 1883, the Police Prefecture established a law enforcement training facility, the École pratique de police municipale (lit. 'Professional School of Municipal Police'), on the building's second floor. The French National Police has referred to this as the world's first-ever police academy. Meanwhile, the Police Prefecture retained services in the rebuilt Palais de la Cité with entrance at 36, quai des Orfèvres, from 1913 to 2017 the iconic site of its judicial police department. An awkward cohabitation between the Police Prefecture and the Republican Guard at the Caserne de la Cité continued until the Guard finally left the building in 1929.

In 1908, as later recounted by Jules Romains in his novel Men of Good Will, the construction of Line 4 of the Paris Metro caused a partial collapse of the building, which was subsequently repaired. In 1938, the Paris Fire Brigade's headquarters relocated to the recently built Caserne Champerret.

=== World War II ===
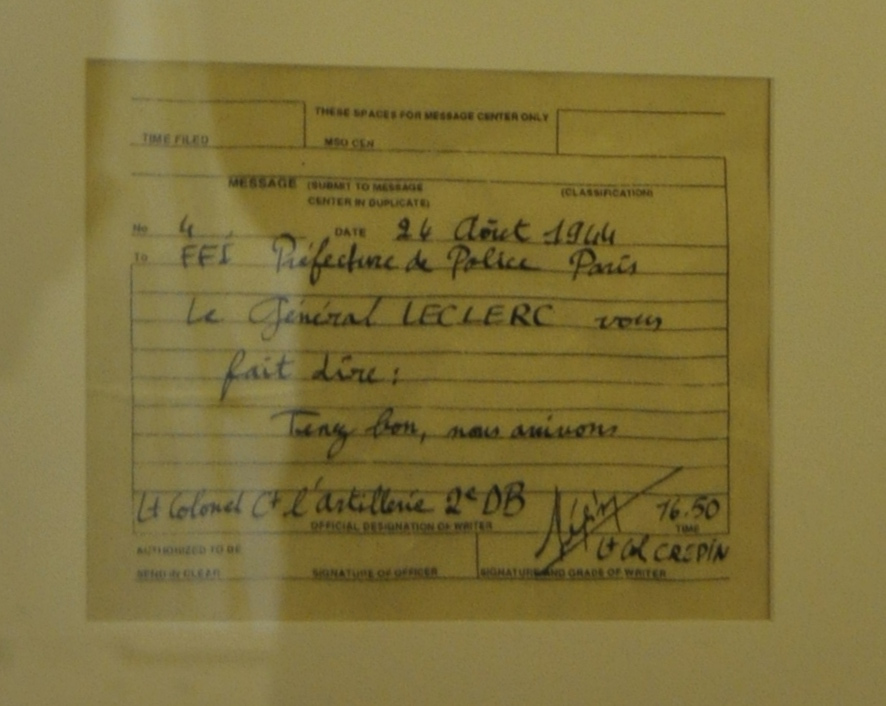
Airdroppoed leaflet with the message "Tenez bon, nous arrivons" addressed by General Leclerc to the Resistance forces at the Caserne de la Cité, 24 August 1944; displayed in the salle du billard

The Caserne de la Cité was the site of major events during World War II and the Liberation of Paris. Under the leadership of René Bousquet from April 1942 to December 1943, then of Joseph Darnand, a specialized team of agents of the Police Prefecture was assigned by the Vichy authorities to work with the German military administration to track Jews, Communists, and members of the Resistance.

In the early morning of 19 August 1944, about two thousand policemen coordinated to take over the building from the collaborationist authorities and to hold it against counterattacks involving three German tanks. From there, the policemen took an active role in the fighting in all of Paris; 167 were killed in the related actions.

On 24 August 1944, the 2nd Armored Division under General Philippe Leclerc de Hauteclocque prepared to enter the city. In the absence of any direct channels of communication with the French Forces of the Interior (FFI) headquartered at the Caserne de la Cité, Leclerc sent a Piper J-3 Cub aircraft manned by Jean Callet and Étienne Mantoux, which dropped leaflets bearing his message "Tenez bon, nous arrivons" (lit. 'hang in there, we're coming') into the Caserne's main courtyard and managed to escape subsequent German anti-aircraft warfare. The FFI then printed copies of Leclerc's message for distribution throughout Paris.

The next day, 25 August 1944, after Leclerc's tanks had successfully entered the city, German commander Dietrich von Choltitz was taken from his office at Le Meurice to the Caserne de la Cité, and signed the formal surrender of German forces in Paris in its billiard room (French: salle du billard) in the presence of General Leclerc together with resistance leaders Henri Rol-Tanguy, Maurice Kriegel-Valrimont and Jacques Chaban-Delmas. With Leclerc's approval, Rol-Tanguy then added his signature to the document, marking the key role of the Resistance in the capital city's liberation.

This sequence of events has been commemorated on numerous occasions. On 12 October 1944, Charles de Gaulle awarded the Legion of Honour and the Croix de Guerre to the Paris Police; he also authorized its agents to bear the Legion of Honour's red fourragère, in breach of the order's procedure and against the misgivings of numerous résistants given the force's prior role in collaboration. Around the same time, the main courtyard was renamed the Cour du 19-Août. A plaque was unveiled in 1947 to commemorate Callet's and Mantoux's heroic mission. Other plaques were unveiled on the respective anniversaries in 1994 by François Mitterrand together with a monumental bronze sculpture by Arman, in 2004 by Jacques Chirac, in 2009 by Nicolas Sarkozy, and in 2014 by François Hollande. A sculpture honoring the resistance was unveiled in the courtyard on 11 October 2024, and a nearby alley was renamed Allée des Défenseurs-de-la-Caserne-de-la-Cité in June 2025. The salle du billard hosts a small museum dedicated to the events of August 1944, which is intermittently open to the public.

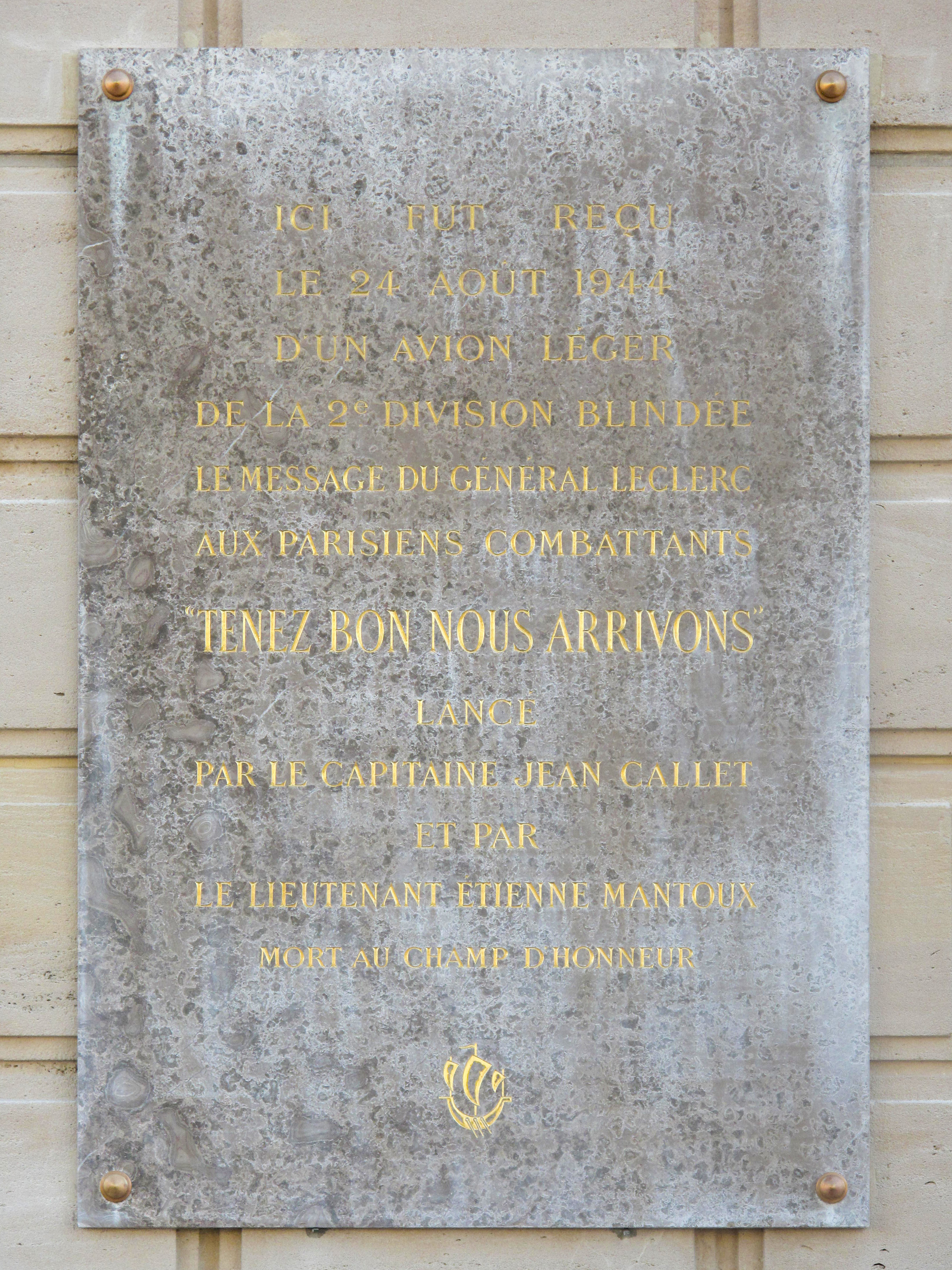
1947 plaque memorializing the message "Tenez bon nous arrivons", quai du Marché-Neuf

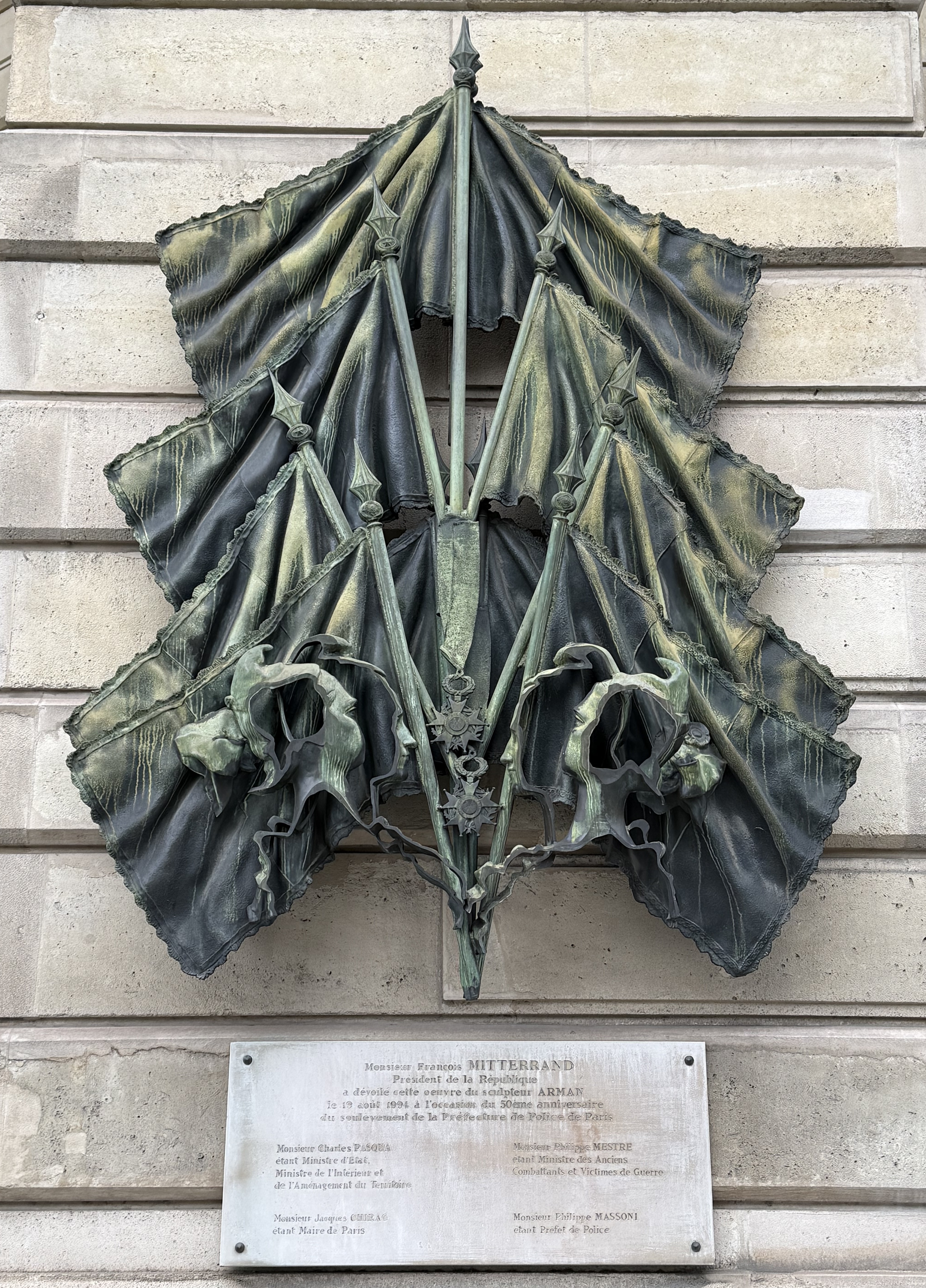
1994 plaque and sculpture, rue de la Cité

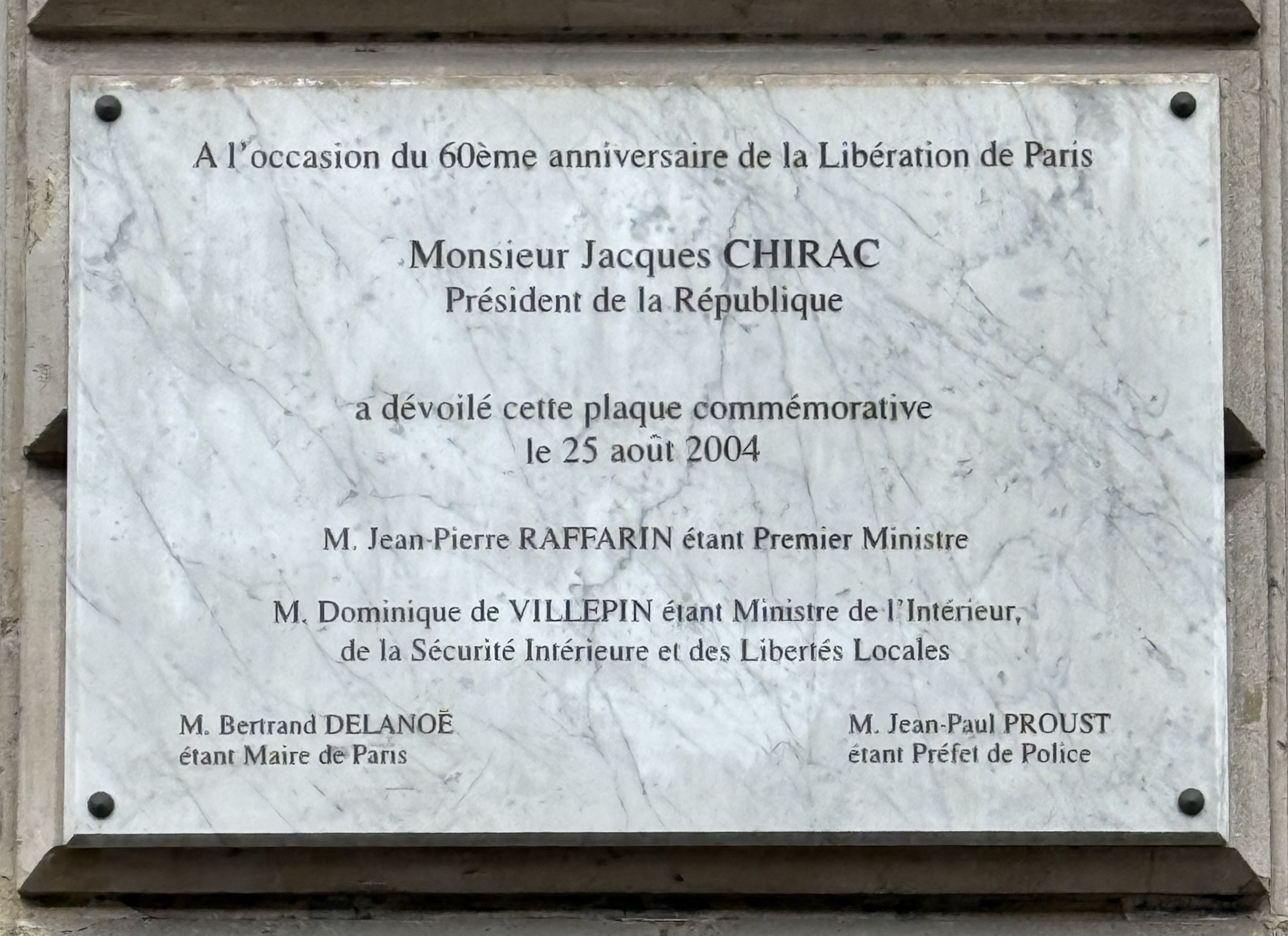
2004 plaque, rue de la Cité

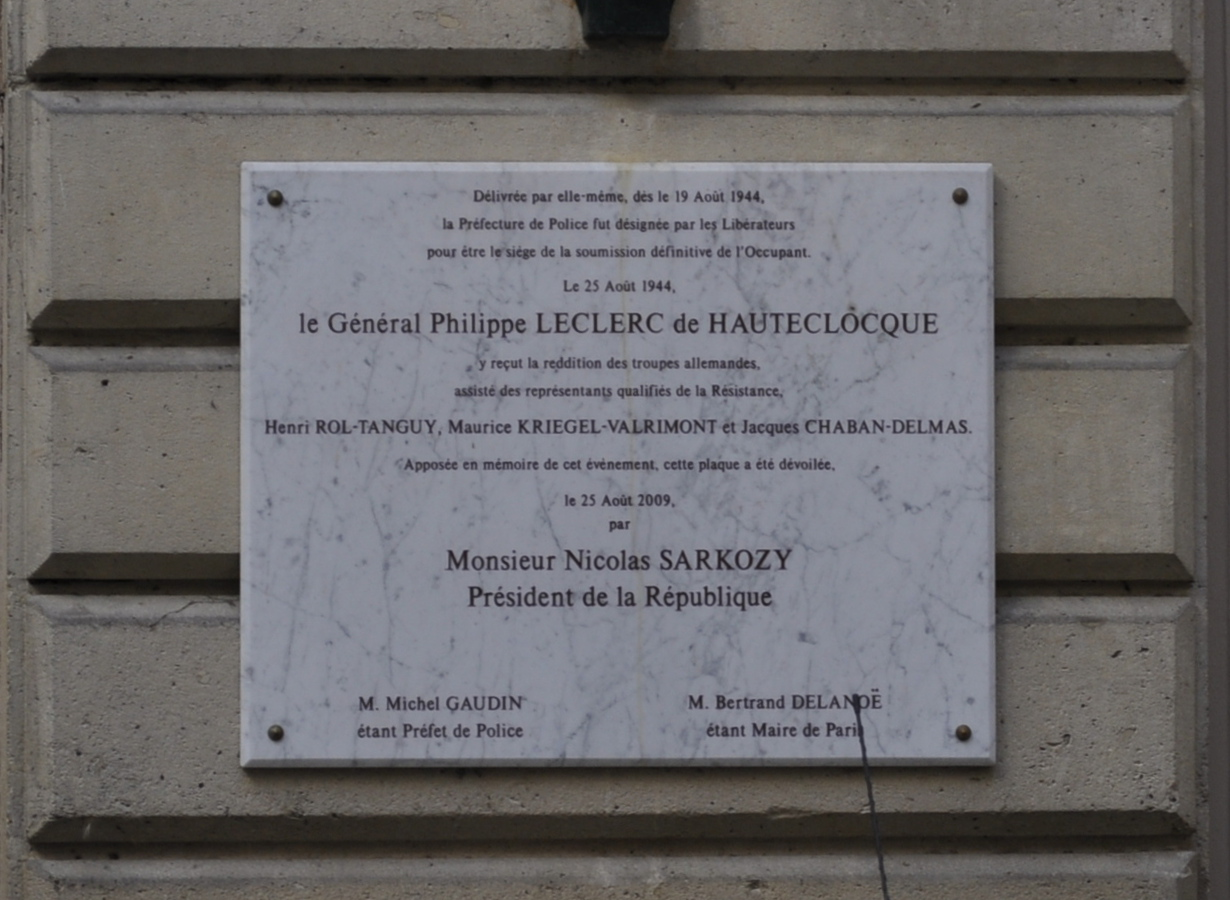
2009 plaque, courtyard of 7, boulevard du Palais

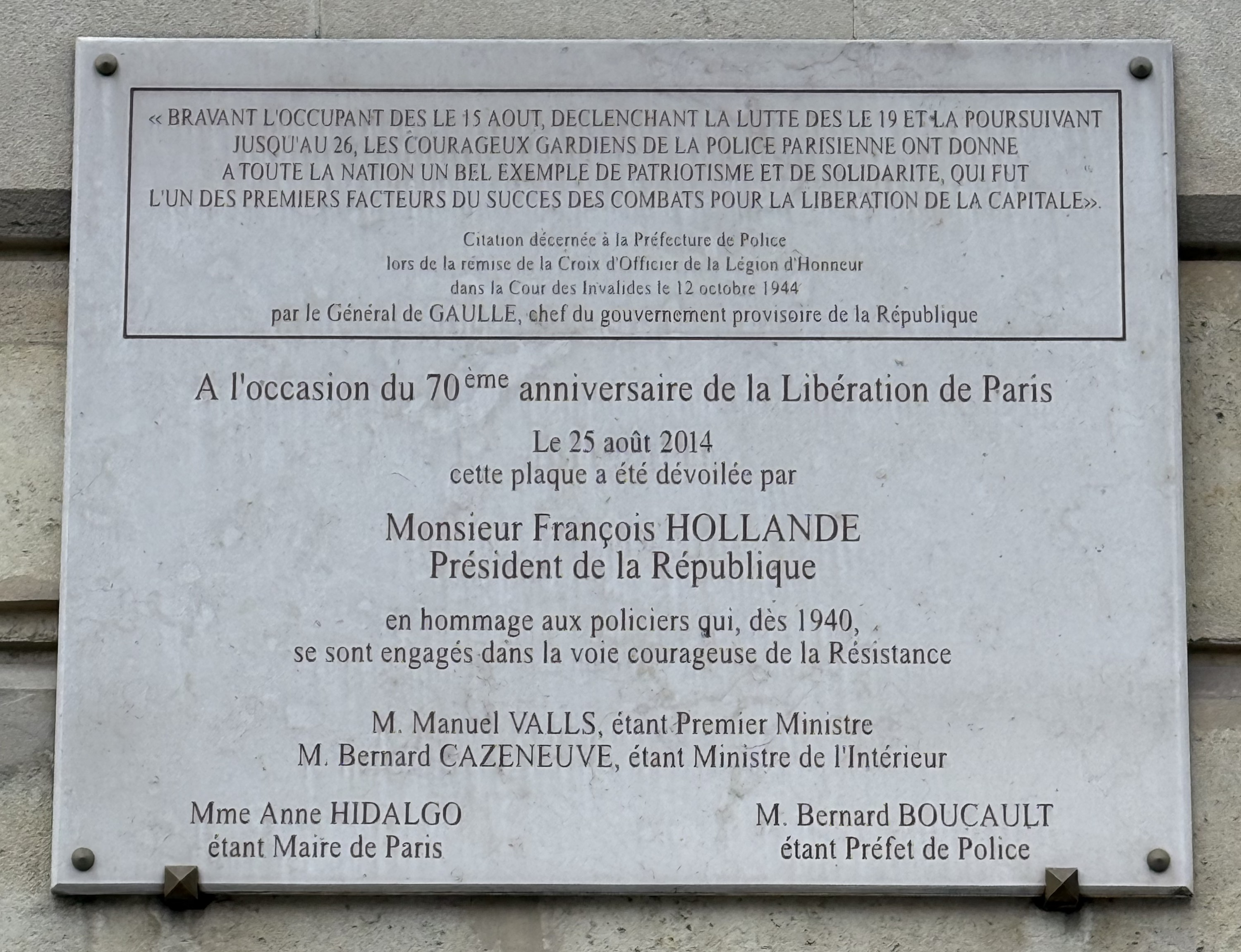
2014 plaque, boulevard du Palais

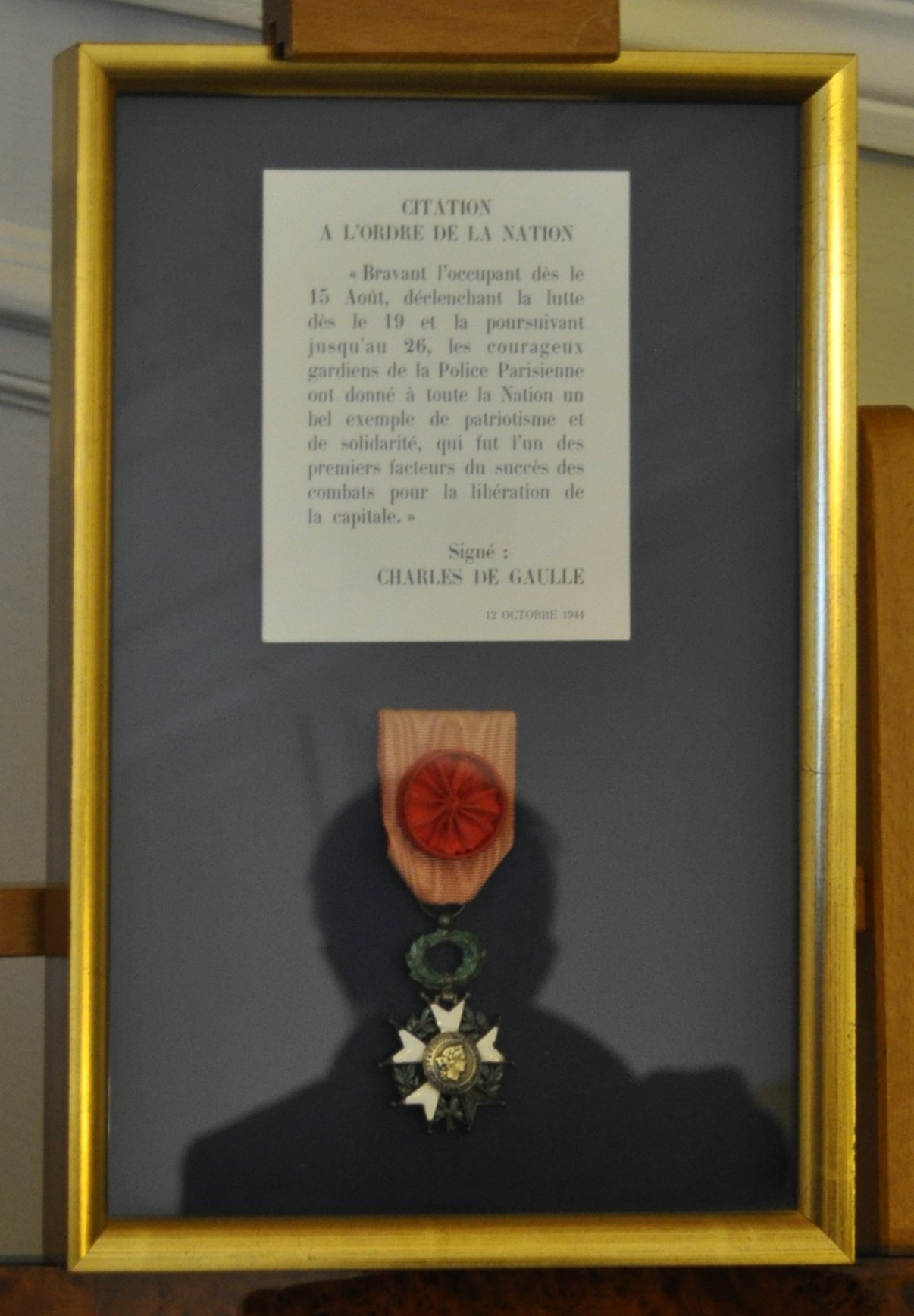
Legion of Honour medal of the Paris Police, displayed in the salle du billard

=== 21st century ===
The main building was comprehensively renovated in 2009-2014. As part of the refurbishment campaign, a small extension was erected in an interstitial space on the Rue de Lutèce side to improve services to visitors. On that occasion, excavations undertaken in 2013 uncovered remains of the Church of Saint Éloi. The new building, designed by architect Fabienne Bulle, was completed in 2016. In 2023, an additional floor of offices was created in the attic of the central (north-south) wing of the building, designed by Hellin Sebag Pirany Architects.

== In popular culture ==
Part of the site on which the Caserne de la Cité was erected in the 1860s had previously been home to a poultry market. Following the Police Prefecture's move into the building in 1871, its officers were soon nicknamed chickens (French: poulets), and that word came to refer to policemen generally in French slang. On the same basis, the Paris Police Prefecture is occasionally referred to as la maison poulaga (lit. 'chicken house'), using a related slang word for chicken.

== See also ==
- Caserne des Petits-Pères
