= Probation (workplace) =

Status given to new employees of a company or business

In a workplace setting, probation (or a probationary period) is a status given to new employees and trainees of a company, business, or organization. This status allows a supervisor, training official, or manager to evaluate the progress and skills of the newly-hired employee, determine appropriate assignments, and monitor other aspects of the employee such as honesty, reliability, and interactions with co-workers, supervisors, or the public.

Probation is often done in companies and businesses, but similar programs are also used in other organizations such as churches, associations, clubs, or orders, where members must gain experience before becoming full-fledged members. Similar practices can be seen in emergency services, using programs such as a field training program (also called probation).

A probationary period varies widely depending on the organization, but can last anywhere from 30 days to several years. In cases of several years, probationary levels may change as time goes on. If the employee shows promise and does well during the probationary period, they are usually removed from probationary status, and may also be given a raise or promotion (in addition to other privileges, as defined by the organization). Probation is usually defined in an organization's employee handbook, typically given to workers when they first begin a job.

The probationary period allows an employer to terminate an employee who is not doing well at their job or is otherwise deemed not suitable for a particular position or any position. Whether this empowers employers to abuse their employees by, without warning, terminating their contract before the probation period has ended, is open for debate. To avoid problems arising from the termination of a new employee, some organizations have waived probationary periods entirely, and instead conduct multiple interviews of the candidate, under a variety of conditions, before making the decision to hire.

In the United Kingdom, an employee's legal rights are not affected by their probationary status, as probation is defined contractually, and not legally.

== See also ==
- Internship
- Field training program
- Field training officer
