= Police training officer =

The Police Training Officer program (PTO) is a post-academy training program created from the educational approach known as problem-based learning. Program development was funded by the United States Department of Justice Office of Community Oriented Policing Services to train police recruits once they graduate from the police academy. It was initially developed to replace the 30-year-old Field Training Officer (FTO) program, which research surveys indicated had become incompatible with community based policing and problem solving.

The PTO Program was created by a team of police experts from the United States and Canada. The team was led by Reno Police Chief Jerry Hoover and included Deputy Chief Ron Glensor, Commander Steve Pitts, Officer Dave Ponte (Reno P.D.), police educator Gerry Cleveland and researcher Gregory Saville, former Canadian police officers. Cleveland and Saville designed and wrote the program with input from the team. The program was field tested for the first time in 2000 in the Reno Police Department, Reno, Nevada. It was later expanded into five other pilot police academies, through assistance of the Police Executive Research Forum and the COPS Office. Those agencies include Charlotte-Mecklenburg (North Carolina), Colorado Springs (Colorado), Richmond (California), Lowell (Massachusetts), and Savannah (Georgia). Through the Police Society for Problem Based Learning (www.pspbl.org) the model has been developed and employed in hundreds of departments in the U.S. and Canada.

As of 2017 more than 200 police agencies have now successfully adopted the PTO program using problem based learning as the basis of recruit training, and Washington, California and Kentucky, South Dakota and most Canadian Provinces have begun adopting it across those regions

A version of the PTO Program was reworked in 2003 by practitioners from Reno and organizations across the United States to better reflect the use of the model by some organizations. A 2nd generation of the PTO was sponsored and written by the Police Society for Problem Based Learning and authored by the original writers, Cleveland and Saville in 2015. (http://www.pspbl.org/) The authors introduced it at the annual meeting of pspbl.org and many agencies have upgraded their model from the original versions. The latest version incorporates 15 years of learning from the original agencies. Early Modifications - known as the Reno Model and others - differ from the original COPS product and the earlier San Jose Model FTO Program. The modifications focus less on adult learning, Emotional Intelligence and Problem based learning. The 2015 upgraded version (PTO v2 - distributed through the non-profit Police Society for Problem Based Learning and reworked by other agencies since the original national PTO model was designed to allow flexible tailoring by each agency. For example, this is the case in the Charlotte-Mecklenburg police, NC, the Folsom police, CA., and the Edmonton police, Alberta, Canada. Each year a number of these models are brought to the Conference of the Police Society for Problem Based Learning and fine tuned by educational experts, police practitioners and agencies from across North America.

In 2003 Gerry Cleveland and Gregory Saville, while working for the US Department of Justice, brought versions of the PTO and Police Problem-Based Learning model to the national police academy of Mozambique, Africa, in an effort to tailor it to developing countries; In 2008 Cleveland and Saville brought the model to the middle east at a national police training facility in Qatar and also to the Australian police academy in Sydney and Perth. Jerry Hover worked in Sudan and Iraq for the US government after his retirement from Reno.

Due to success of the program, a subsequent certification process was developed for police instructors called Police Problem Based Learning (PBL) for Instructor Development, also funded by the COPS office, the program led to the creation of the non-profit, non-affiliated Police Society for Problem Based Learning, an international organization of police instructors interested in improving all aspects of police education.

== See also ==
- You in Blue - Police Training Resource book for New officers. (http://www.pspbl.org/)
- Thin Blue Line Forum
- Police academy
- Field Training Officer
- Problem Based Learning
