= Field training program =

A field training program (FTP), also known as a probationary program, is a type of probationary training and evaluation program that gives trainees and recruits actual first-hand experience in their occupation and field of work. It is similar to, and often works alongside, formal training in academies or training camps. Field training programs are often led by field training officers (FTO) or otherwise experienced members, who guide trainees in completing their training and report on their behaviors and experiences for further evaluation.

Field training programs are often used in, and originate from, emergency services, namely police and emergency medical services. Militaries and paramilitaries may also use similar programs.

== History ==
Though similar practices existed, often as simple as simply assigning new members with more experienced members, the earliest known formal field training program originated with the San Jose Police Department in the 1960s and 1970s.

Prior to the 1960s, the SJPD did not have a formal training program. In the early 1960s, they used a brief police certification academy, initially using an informal checklist. In 1972, SJPD Lieutenant Robert Allen proposed an eight-week training program using a daily observation report (DOR). In 1973 the program was overhauled and a police psychologist established the department's 1-to-7 rating scale for DORs. In 1974 a questionnaire from seventy FTOs established the rating criteria of 1, 4, and 7.

Since then, the SJPD's FTP program, also known as the "San Jose model", has been adopted and modified, most notably by the Houston Police Department in the early 1980s, the Travis County Sheriff's Office in 1992, and the Reno Police Department in the early 2000s. The "Travis County model", also called the "Whitehead model" for program developer TCSO Sergeant Richard Whitehead, has also been adopted and modified over time. In 2018 Whitehead introduced software for its program users.

== Programs and models ==
The San Jose model is a 16-week program, consisting of four "rotations":

- Rotation 1, two weeks of the "limbo" period consisting solely of formal training.
- Rotation 2, four weeks where the trainee is assigned to a different FTO and shift.
- Rotation 3, the final four weeks with another different FTO and shift.
- Rotation 4, the final evaluation, where an FTO, dressed in regular clothing, observes the trainee's actions and behavior in a hands-off approach. The trainee operates as though they are alone. Certain variants of the San Jose model do not include Rotation 4 due to liability and safety concerns.

The Houston model, is somewhat similar, but replaces the four rotations with seven phases: Phases 1 to 4 are formal training, Phase 5 is evaluation, Phase 6 is remedial training in any categories failed in Phase 5, and Phase 7 is the final evaluation. Scoring uses a scale from 1 to 5.

The Travis County model, also known as the Whitehead model, is very similar to the Houston model, but with fourteen performance categories as opposed to the sixteen categories used in the San Jose and Houston models. Scoring is simply "pass" and "fail"; the model was developed to focus is on proper training, not just the trainee's score.

== Field training officer ==
In a field training program, the field training officer (FTO) is usually a senior officer within the organization that has been trained in the FTP. The FTO's duties consist of training and evaluating the trainee, explaining policy and procedure, promoting proper behavior and practices, and testing the trainee using verbal and written examinations. FTOs are also responsible for examining, completing, documenting, and discussing the scores from the DOR with the trainee and officials. FTOs must provide remedial training for the trainee if it is necessary.

== Emergency medical services ==
Though originating with law enforcement, FTO programs have also been adopted by emergency medical services and fire departments, many of which mandate formal orientation programs that are more robust and comprehensive than the credentialing process typically seen in hospitals and other medical organizations. This is particularly true of agencies that perform "high risk, low frequency" skills that are subject to increased scrutiny.

EMS FTPs are unique in that they have both public safety and medical concerns and parameters, and work dramatically different schedules than those normally seen in law enforcement. EMS agencies often struggle to integrate clinical and medical parameters into the police-oriented FTP models, so there is significantly more variation in EMS FTPs than those used in law enforcement.

== Legal considerations ==
The Commission On Accreditation for Law Enforcement Agencies (CALEA) mandates that any agencies seeking accreditation must conduct formal field training, as do many state accreditation processes. A good FTP reduces civil litigation alleging negligent hiring and retention of trainees. It is a cost-effective way of eliminating non-effective, non-productive personnel.

Though the final evaluations of FTPs typically consists of the trainee being observed by the FTO and must handle incidents by themselves, certain variants and models do not include this due to liability and safety concerns, as an inexperienced trainee may be injured or fail to properly perform important actions in certain situations without assistance.

FTOs and FTPs are also subject to increased scrutiny in instances of failure, misconduct, or excessive force, as they are responsible for training new members, meaning their failures could potentially affect the behaviors, trust, or perception of the rest of the organization. For example, Minneapolis Police Department Officer Derek Chauvin, convicted for the murder of George Floyd in 2020, was an FTO; two of the other officers with him who held down Floyd's arms and legs were recruits who were being trained by Chauvin.

== In popular culture ==
The police procedural television series Adam-12 and The Rookie both depict field training programs in the Los Angeles Police Department. In both series, the rookies being evaluated are assigned to FTOs or experienced officers and complete their FTPs in early seasons, becoming full-fledged police officers for the rest of the series. However, they typically do not switch partners, and remain assigned with their FTO during and after their FTP.

== See also ==
- Probation (workplace)
- Police academy
- Military academy
- Training camp
- Training ship
- Training simulation
- Internship
