= Emeric Chantier =

French sculptor

Emeric Chantier (born 1986, Montreuil) is a French sculptor. He integrates the place and the condition of humans in nature in a trans-generational, universal and atemporal fashion.

== Career ==
Chantier's career began in 2006 in workshops in teams of artists performing decorative works for architects, private individuals and prestigious brands. He learnt sculpture and integrated the techniques of "model making". He began producing works that borrowed from humanism, poetry, and commitment.

== Technique ==
Chantier is a self-taught artist who relies on molding and gluing techniques. Integrating dried vegetables and industrial and household materials, he assembles and diverts the elements to compose works that offer multiple readings, both in form and in meaning.

Chantier commented about his work:

On the one hand, my work is linked to the nature and the relationship that man can have with the latter, a confrontation with our origins, an ecological awareness of the preciousness of our "mother nature" source of all life, a subject that is important to me and should, in my view, be part of a collective consciousness. On the other hand, it seems important to me not to fall into a moralizing discourse, simply to illustrate the entity of the living and confront it at times with the productions of man. These sculptures take the form of anatomical parts of man or his creations that furnish his daily life so that he can identify with them without yet becoming a target. These are simple poetic narratives that must speak for themselves. It is also important to show a work of meticulousness and quality, so that the observer after reading the general form, can approach it and forget it in order to get lost in a universe swarming with life.

== Exhibitions ==
- 2016: De Humanum Natura, A2Z Art Gallery, Paris, France
- 2016: "Art Paris Art Fair", represented among others by A2Z Art Gallery, Grand Palais, Paris, France
- 2016: Etat second, (collective exhibition, A2Z Art Gallery, Paris, France.
- 2015: "OFF Art Fair Bruxelles", Macadam Gallery, Belgium
- 2015: "9e élément", Macadam Gallery, Belgium
- 2015: St'art, Macadam Gallery, Belgium
- 2015: Macadam Gallery (collective exhibition),
- 2015: Belgique Galerie Sebban – exposition collective
- 2014: "OFF Art Fair Bruxelles", Macadam Gallery, Belgium
- 2014: Youngs & Contemporary, Macadam Gallery, Belgium
- 2014: Lille Art Up, Macadam Gallery, Belgium
- 2014: Summer of Colors, Macadam Gallery, Belgium
- 2013: MAC Paris, Espace Champerret
- 2013: AAF, Macadam Gallery, Belgium
- 2013: Galerie Arnaud Bard (collective exhibition), Boulogne-Billancourt, France
- 2013: Galerie 13 (collective exhibition), Montpellier, France
