= Paris Fire Brigade =

French Army unit and primary fire and rescue service for the city of Paris

- Brigade des sapeurs-pompiers de Paris
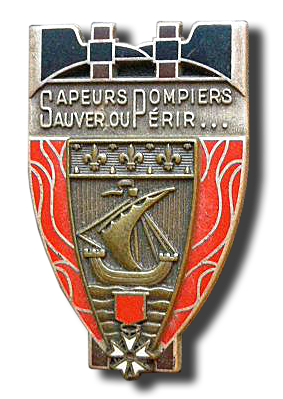
- BSPP insignia
- Active: 1793–present
- Country: France
- Branch: French Army
- Type: Firefighter
- Role: Firefighting, emergency service
- Size: ~ 8,500
- Motto: Sauver ou périr (Save or Perish)
- Colors: Red & black

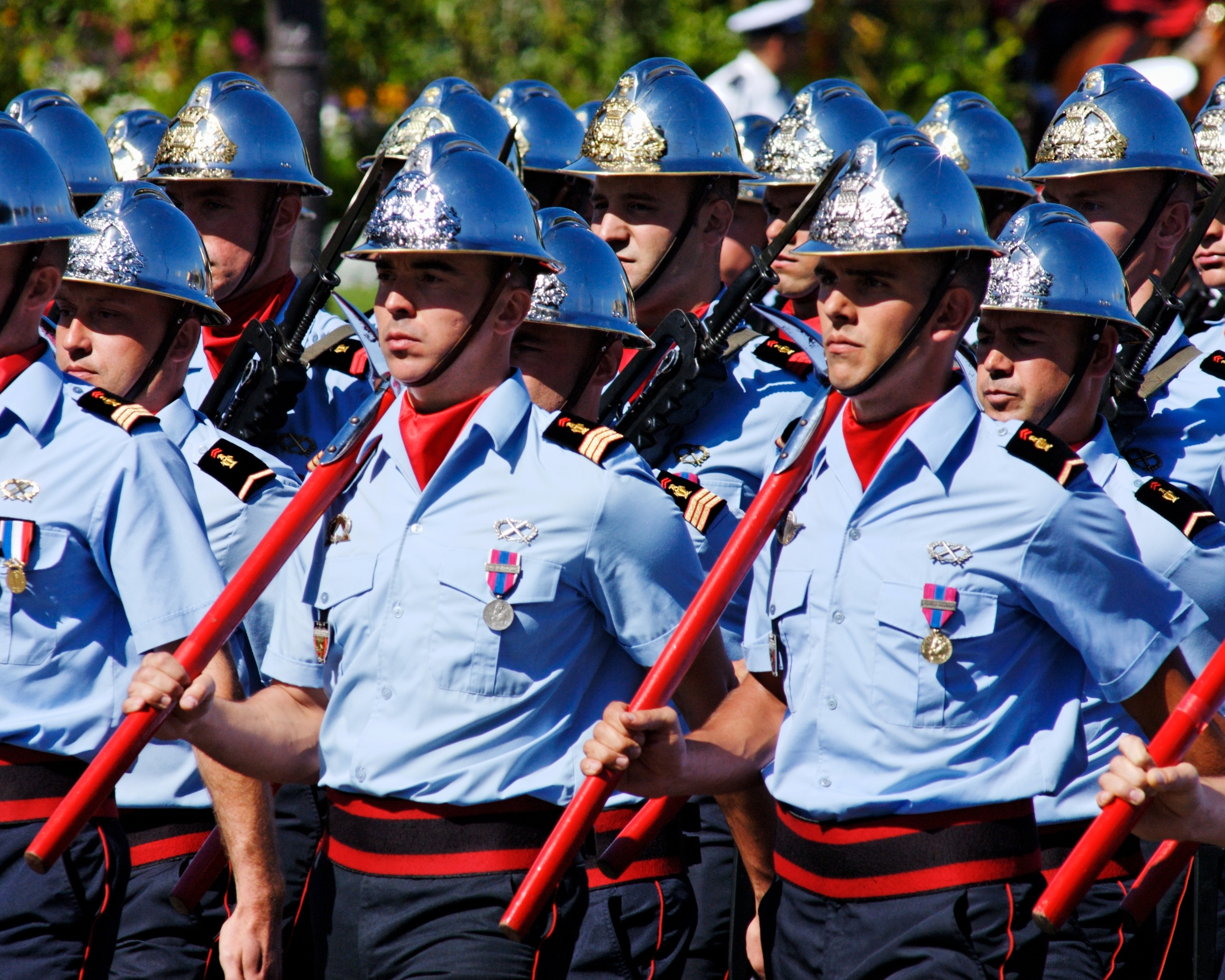
The Brigade on the 2008 Bastille Day parade

The Paris Fire Brigade (French: Brigade des sapeurs-pompiers de Paris, BSPP) is a French Army unit which serves as the primary fire and rescue service for Paris, the city's inner suburbs and certain sites of national strategic importance.

The brigade's main area of responsibility is the City of Paris and the surrounding départements of Seine-Saint-Denis, Val-de-Marne, and Hauts-de-Seine (the petite couronne). It also serves the Guiana Space Centre in Kourou, the DGA Military Rocket Test Centre in Biscarosse, and the Lacq gas field. As with the other fire services of France, the brigade provides technical rescue, search and rescue and fire prevention services and is one of the providers of emergency medical services.

The brigade is one of two fire services in France that is part of the armed forces, with the other being the Marseille Naval Fire Battalion (BMPM). It is a unit of the French Army's Engineering Arm (l'arme du génie) and the firefighters are therefore sappers (sapeurs, thus sapeurs-pompiers). With 8,550 firefighters, it is the largest fire service in Europe and the third largest municipal urban fire service in the world, after the Tokyo Fire Department and New York City Fire Department. Its motto is "Save or Perish" (French "Sauver ou périr").

== History ==
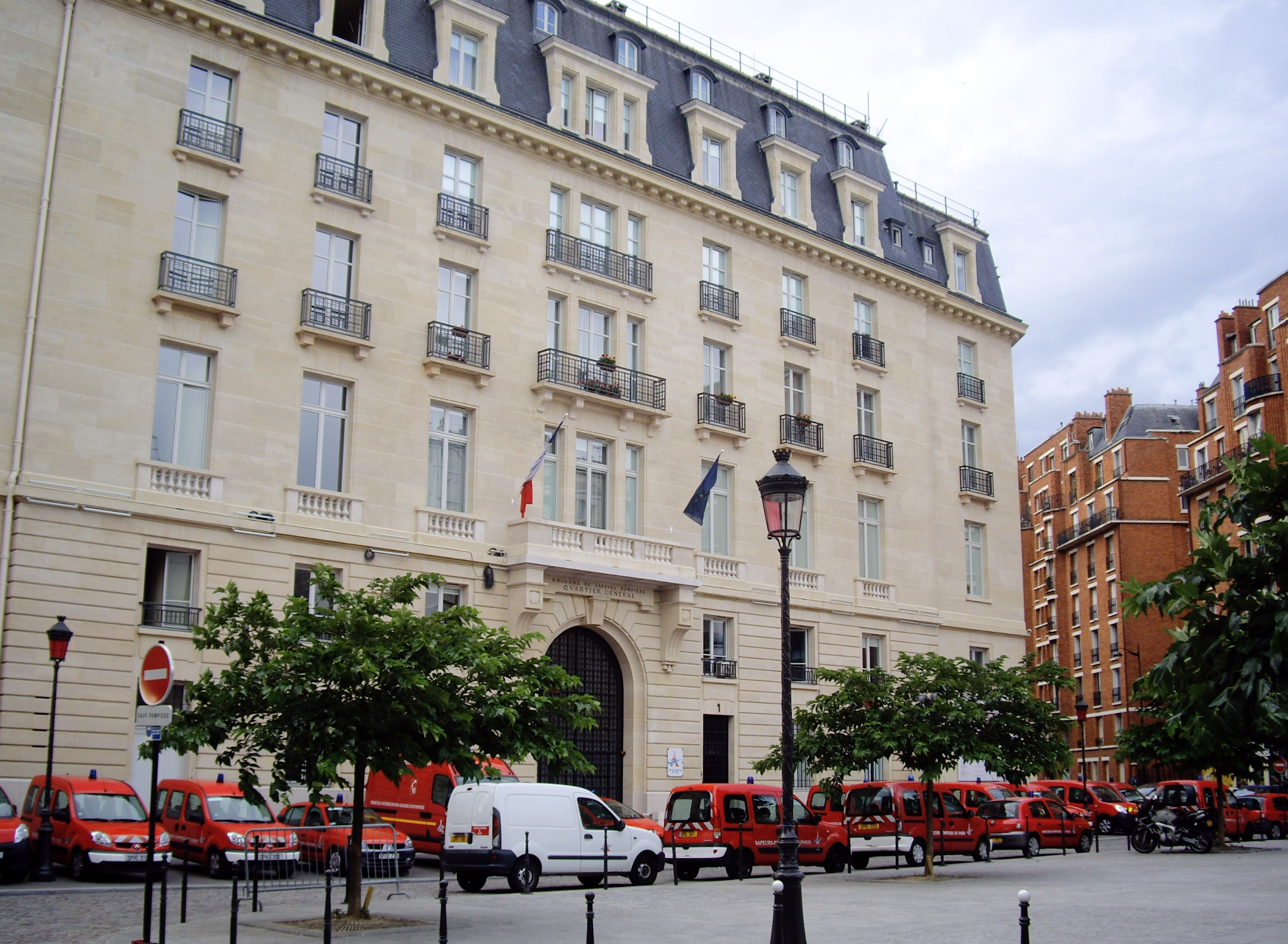
The Caserne Champerret, Fire Brigade headquarters since 1938

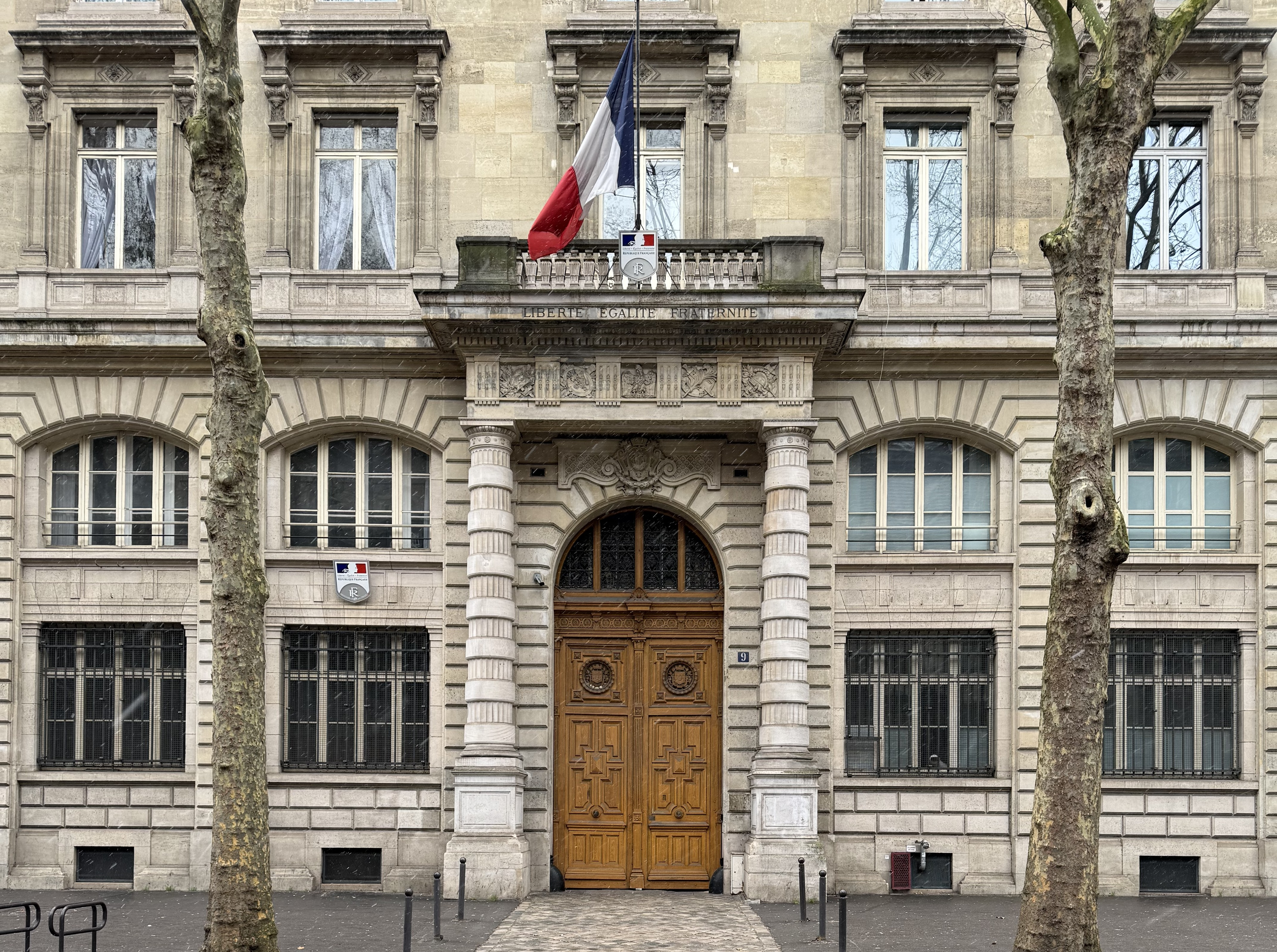
9, boulevard du Palais, Fire Brigade headquarters from 1867 to 1938

Founded in 1793 as the Corps des gardes-pompes de la ville de Paris and following the 23-hour Austrian Embassy Fire in 1810 became a military organisation by imperial decree of Emperor Napoléon. On 18 September 1811, it became the Bataillon de sapeurs-pompiers de Paris and was expanded to the Régiment de sapeurs-pompiers de Paris in 1867. During the Franco-Prussian War and World War I the sapeurs-pompiers were mobilised for military service, while continuing to fulfill their firefighting responsibilities.

On 1 March 1967, it became the Brigade des sapeurs-pompiers de Paris.

== Selection and training ==
The operational personnel (hommes du rang i.e. other ranks or rank and file) are usually engaged for five years. They must have French nationality, be between 18 and 25 years old, have a clean criminal record and have at least a vocational training CAP certificate. The selection is three days long, with sports tests, psychomotor tests, medical examination, etc.

Training takes place in the Training Group (Groupement d'instruction, GI), at the fort of Villeneuve-Saint-Georges. The first period lasts two months, with the first aid and first responder training, and basic military instruction (including shooting). They then undertake practical training of four months in an operational fire company (compagnie d'incendie); this includes taking part in personal assistance and utility safety operations. The last stage of training is a further two months at the Training Group. Upon completing training, the firefighter joins a fire company.

== Resources ==
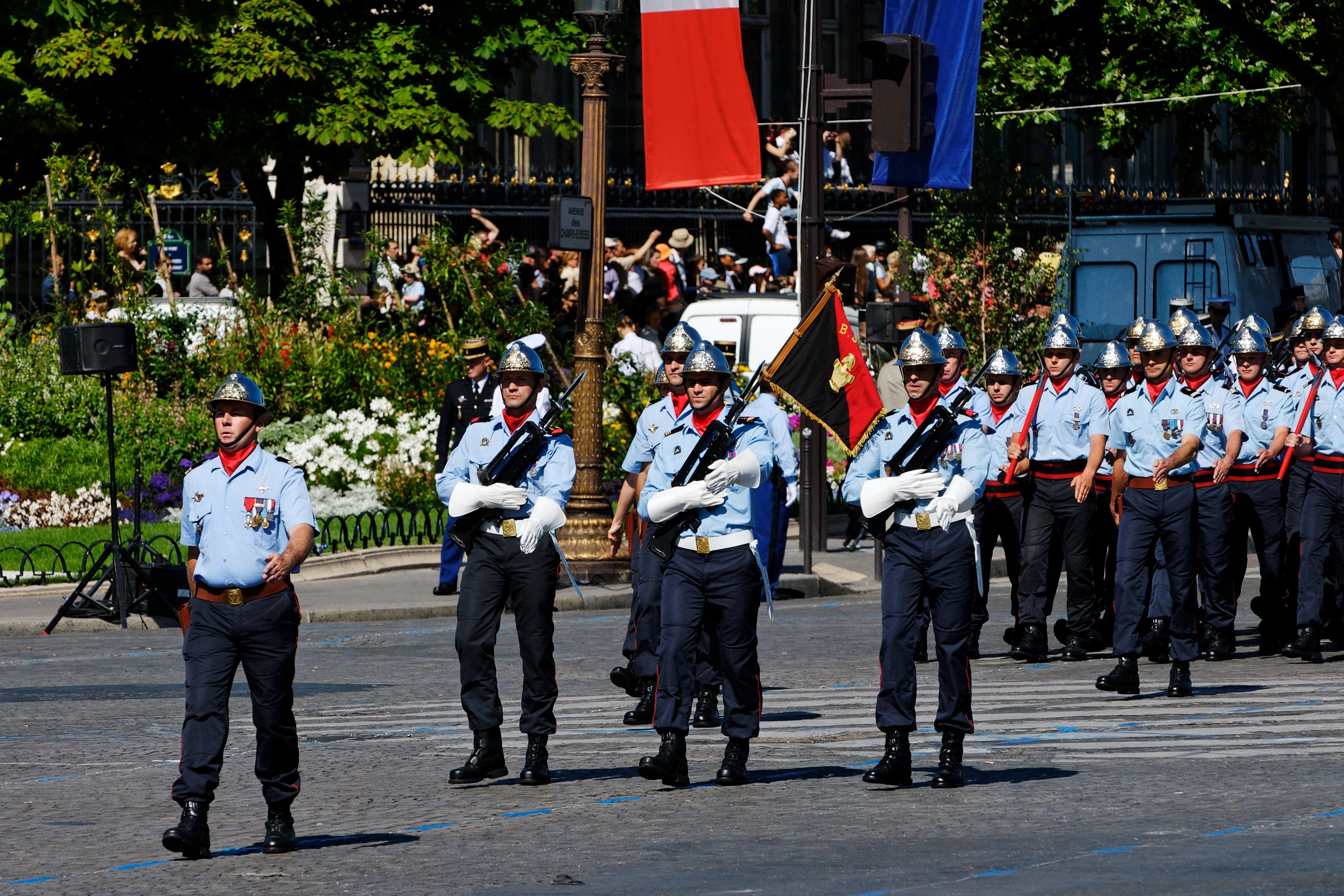
Firemen of the Paris Fire Brigade on the 2008 Bastille Day parade, Champs-Élysées, Paris

The BSPP consists of 8,550 personnel with 81 stations and facilities who conduct 1,200 operations daily.

- 463 pieces of equipment
  - 130 Pumpers
  - 63 Aerial Devices
  - 66 Ambulances
  - 71 Command and Patrol vehicles
  - 133 Special Engines
    - Fireboats
    - All terrain vehicles
    - Four wheel drives

== Organisation ==
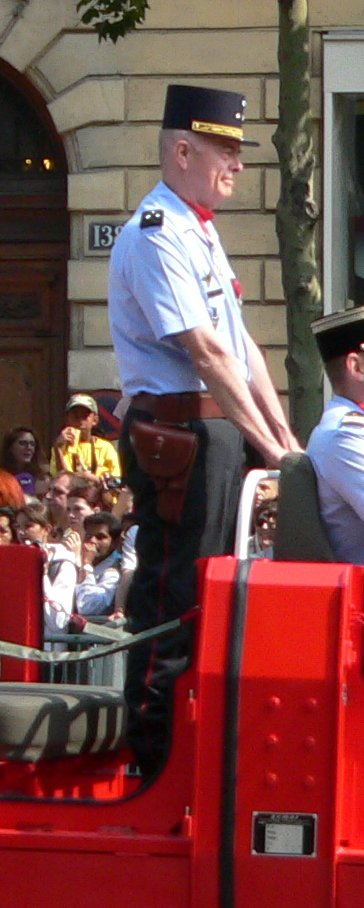
General Bernard Périco, as of 2006 commanding officer of the Paris Fire Brigade (BSPP)

The brigade is commanded by a Brigade General as part of the French Army's engineering arm. The brigade commander directly controls the Information and Public Relations Bureau, and who is assisted a Colonel-Adjutant, a General Council called a Cabinet and a Chief of Staff who controls the following Bureaus:

- General Studies Bureau
- Financial Programs and Budget Bureau

and three Assistant Chiefs of Staff:

- Assistant Chief for Employment
  - Operations Bureau
  - Formation and Instruction Bureau
  - Prevention Bureau
- Assistant Chief for Logistics
  - Techniques Service
  - Infrastructure Service
  - Administrative Service
  - Telecommunications and Information Service
- Assistant Chief for Human Resources
  - Human resources Bureau
  - Personnel Welfare Bureau
- Chief Doctor
  - Emergency medical service/SAMU
  - Chief of the Health Service

Operational staff are divided into three geographic groups, as well as a training group and a services group. The geographic groups are:

- First fire group – northeast Paris and Seine-Saint-Denis
- Second fire group – southeast Paris and Val-de-Marne
- Third fire group – west Paris and Hauts-de-Seine

Each of the geographic groups consists of 8 fire companies and a few special units that are not part of a company (including ambulance units). Each company in turn consists of 2-4 fire stations.

=== First fire group (Premier groupement d'incendie) ===
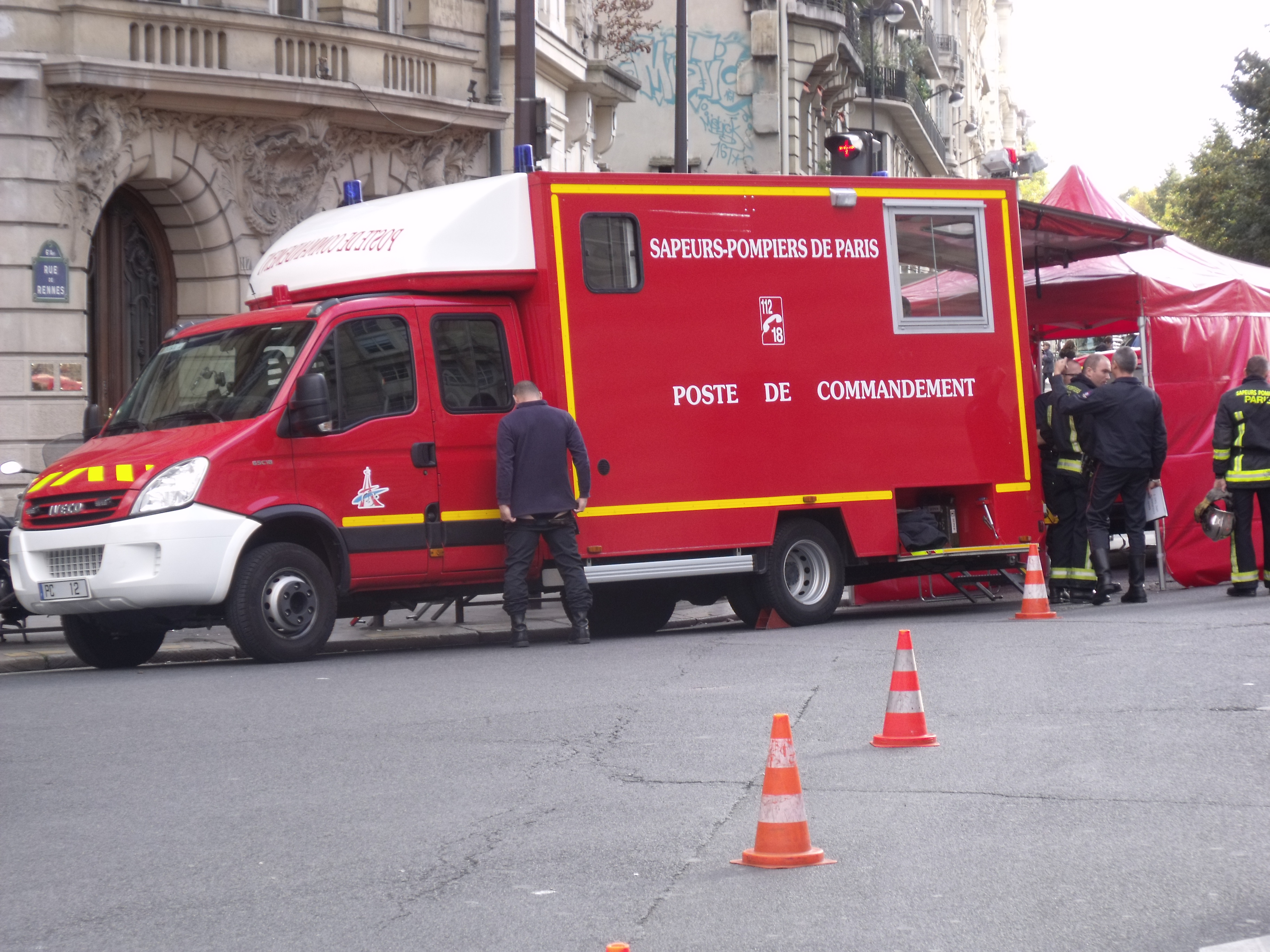
Mobile HQ of Paris Fire Brigade in action.

The First fire group of the Paris Fire Brigade covers northeast Paris and Seine-Saint-Denis and is based in the 18th arrondissement of Paris. It consists of the following companies:

- 7th at Blanche
- 9th at Montmartre
- 10th at Landon
- 12th at Ménilmontant
- 13th at Aulnay-sous-Bois
- 14th at Clichy-sous-Bois
- 24th at Montreuil
- 26th at Saint-Denis

Additional units include:

- Fire Group Staff
- EMS/SAMU
- Facilities (Maintenance) Group

=== Second fire group (Deuxième groupement d'incendie) ===
New generation First Aid / PSE (First Aid Evacuation) (or 6th generation) in Paris.

The Second Fire Group of the Paris Fire Brigade covers Southeast Paris and Val-de-Marne and is based in the 13th arrondissement of Paris. It consists of the following companies:

- 1st at Chaligny
- 2nd at Massena
- 8th at Rousseau
- 11th at Sévigné
- 15th at Champigny
- 17th at Créteil
- 22nd at Rungis
- 23rd at Saint-Maur

Additional units include:

- Fire Group Staff
- EMS/SAMU
- Facilities (Maintenance) Group

=== Third fire group (Troisième groupement d'incendie) ===
Fire support truck near Massena Fire Station.

The Third Fire Group of the Paris Fire Brigade covers Western Paris and Hauts-de-Seine and is based in Courbevoie, Hauts-de-Seine. It consists of the following companies:

- 3rd at Port Royal
- 4th at Colombier
- 5th at Champerret
- 6th at Grenelle
- 16th at Boulogne
- 21st at Plessis Clamart
- 27th at Gennevilliers
- 28th at Nanterre

Additional units include:

- Fire Group Staff
- EMS/SAMU
- Atelier Group

=== Training Group (Groupement d'instruction) ===
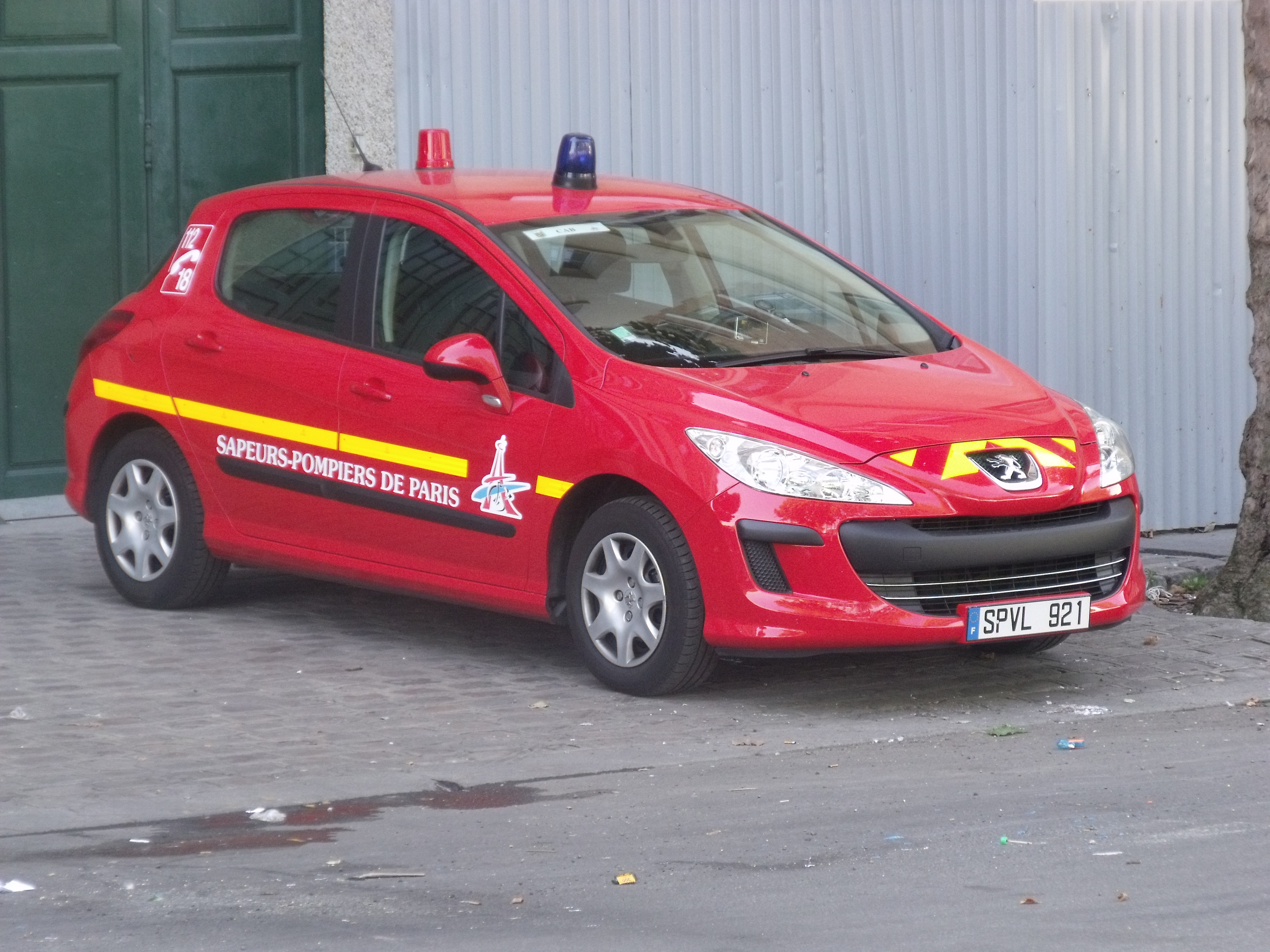
Peugeot 308 (Chief officer's car).

The Training Group of the Paris Fire Brigade provides education and training to all Paris firefighters. It consists of the following:

- Group Staff
- EMS/SAMU
- Center for Formation and Cadres
- Center for the Instruction of Recruits
  - Basic Training Company
  - Auto School, driving and repairs
- Support Company

== Special services ==
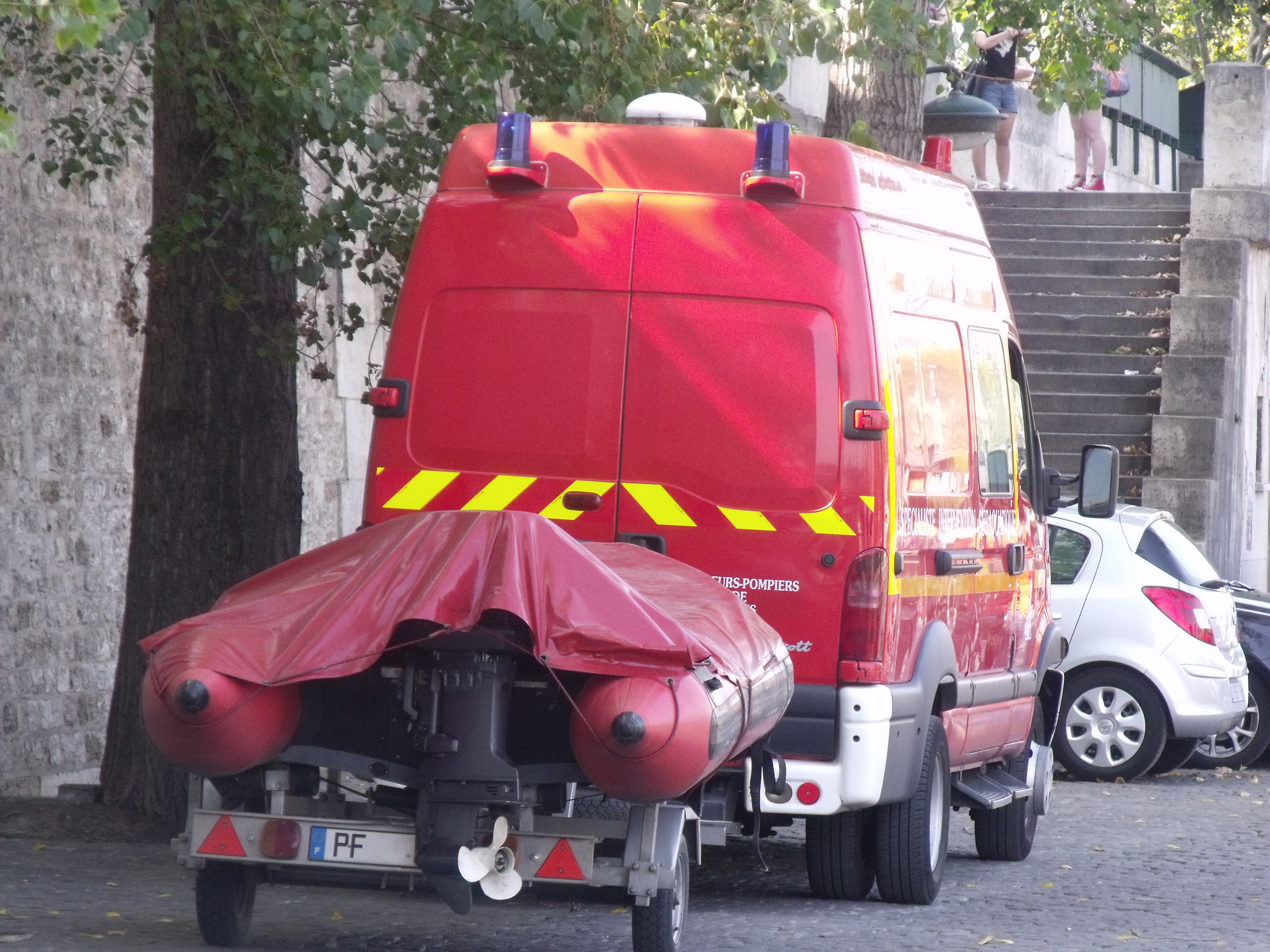
Renault Mascott light truck of the Scuba unit of Paris firemen.

Controlled by Headquarters

- Divers/SCUBA
- Search and Rescue
- Canine Service
- Paris Fire Brigade Band
- Gymnastic Team
- Air Service
- Boat Service

== Frequency of operations ==
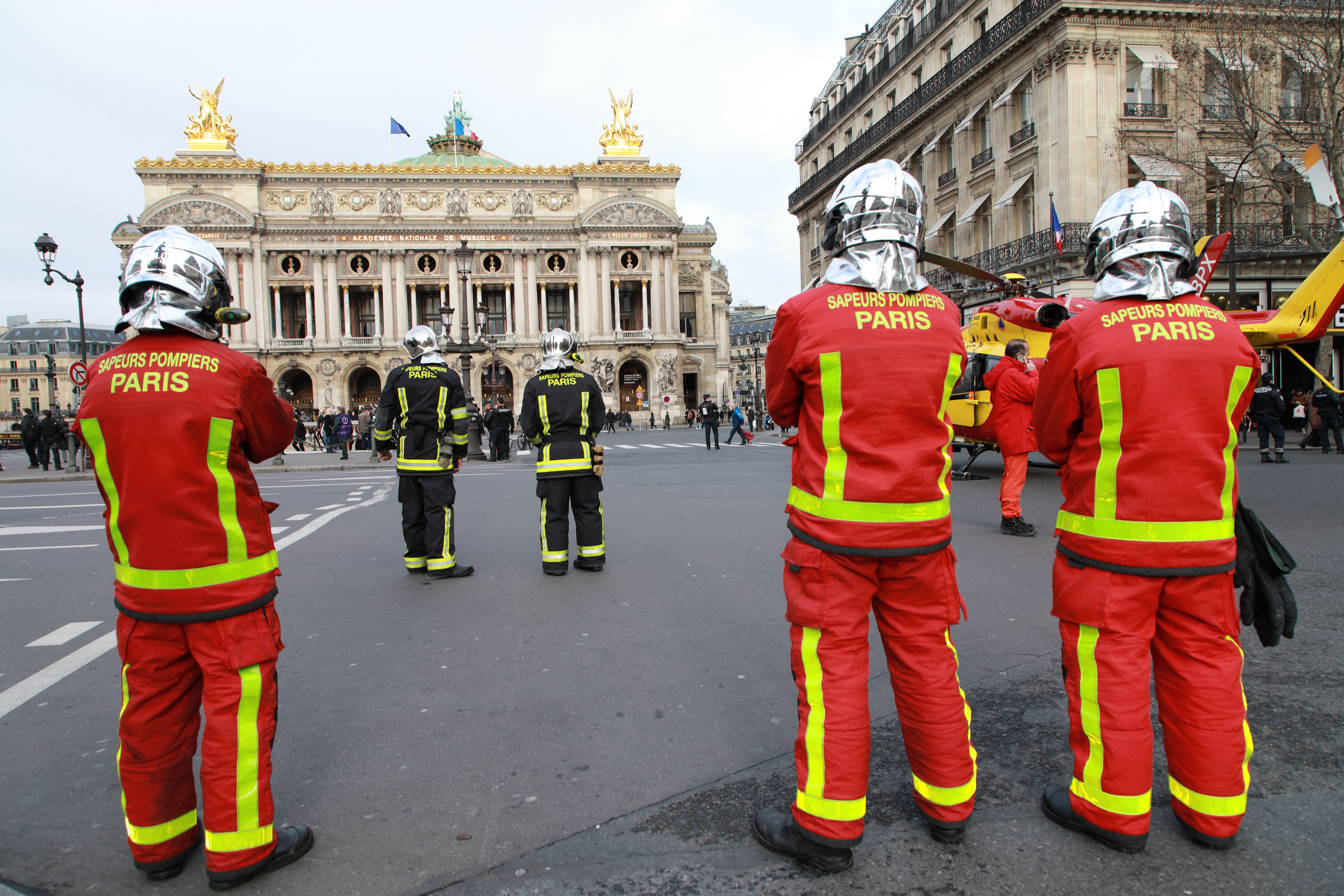
Paris Fire Brigade (BSPP) firemen displaying various uniforms. Place de l'Opéra, Paris - 12 January 2019.

Firefighters after a drill during an open house event, July 2026.

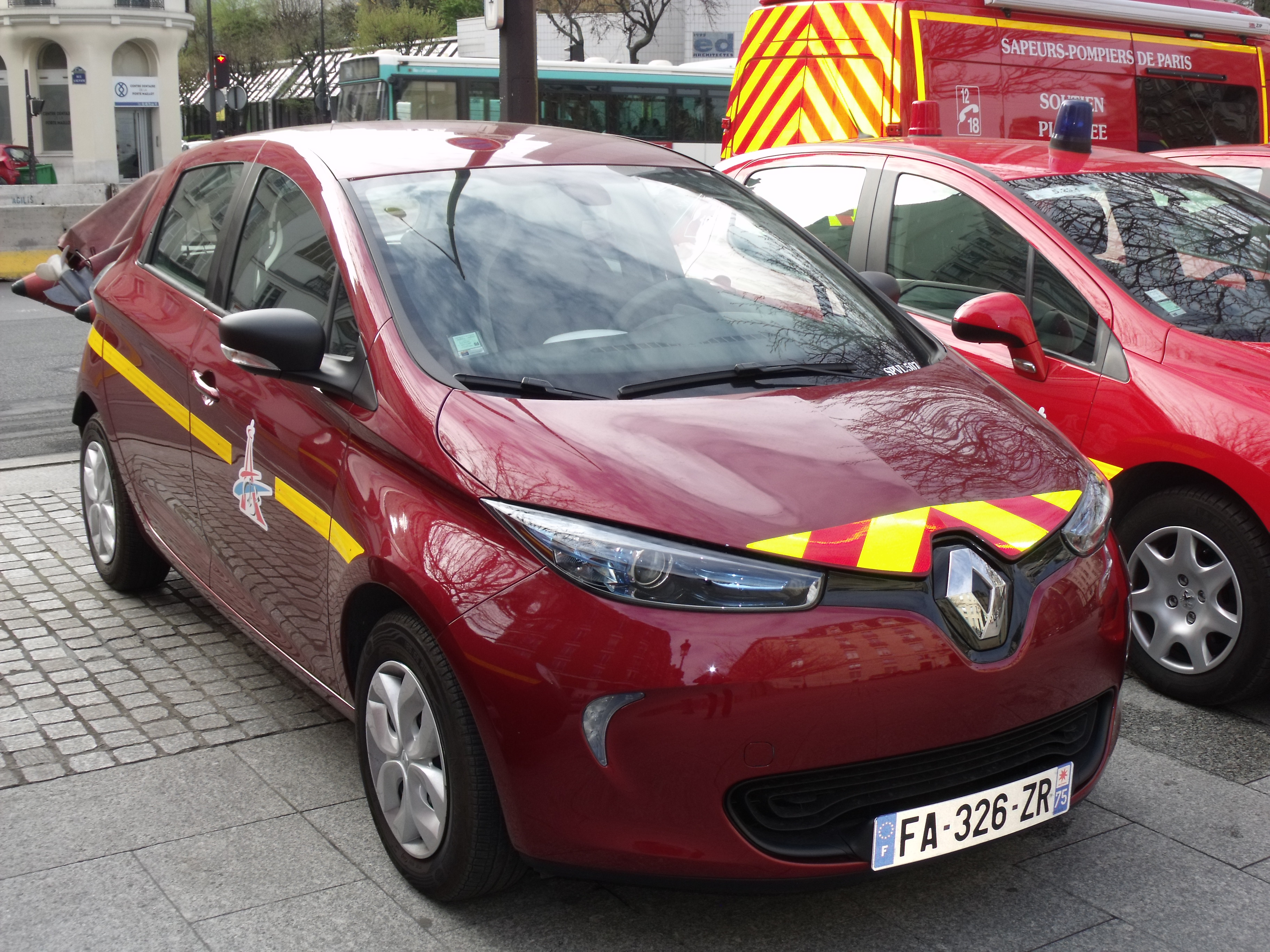
Light electric car Renault Zoe, Paris, June 2019.

The BSPP performs about 1200 interventions per day. During 2001:

- 1st fire group: 163,081 interventions, including 9,606 fires
- 2nd fire group: 136,078 interventions, including 5,583 fires
- 3rd fire group: 150,376 interventions, including 5,234 fires

There are 6.16 million inhabitants in the BSPP zone (1999). This represents:

- per day: 19 interventions per 100,000 inhabitants
- per year: 7,300 interventions, including 331 fires, per 100,000 inhabitants

== Personnel ==
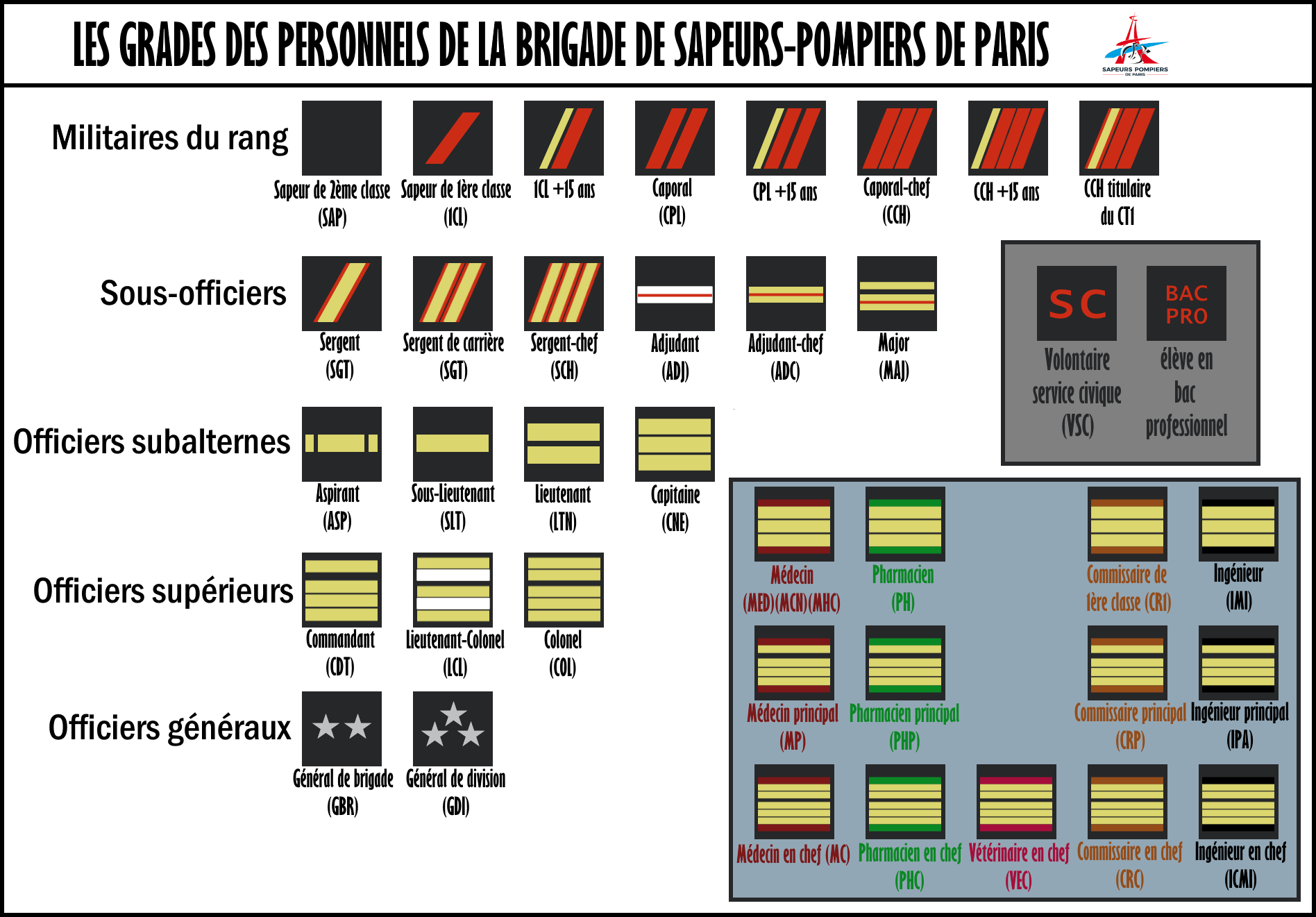
Ranks and rank insignia of the Paris Fire Brigade.

== Ceremonial duties ==
Traditionally, the Paris Fire Brigade parades twice during the Bastille Day military parade: once on foot, and a second time with its vehicles. During the parade members are armed due to their membership in the armed forces.

Evening dance parties are held at fire stations on (or near to) Bastille Day. These are known as a Bal des pompiers (firefighters' ball).

== See also ==
- Caserne de la Cité, former headquarters of the Fire Brigade
- Police Nationale
- Prefecture of Police of Paris
- Sapeurs-pompiers
