= Paris Fire Brigade Band =

The Paris Fire Brigade Band (French: Musique de la brigade de sapeurs-pompiers de Paris) is a military band of French Army that belongs to the Paris Fire Brigade (BSPP). It also supports the Prefecture of Police.

Its primary missions are to strengthen the solemnity of the BSPP ceremonies and to be one of its representative elements in France and the international sphere. It is composed of specialist musicians, from all over the country and graduates of the National Conservatory of Music and Dance.

The band performs in different formations:

- Parade Band
- Concert Band
- Big Band
- Street Band
- Small ensembles (clarinet quartet, saxophone quintet, wind ensemble, and brass ensemble)

Currently, the band is placed under the direction of the following leaders:

- Director of Music – Major Dominique Fiaudrin
- Assistant Music Director – Sergeant Vincent Pagès
- Drum Major – Chief Sergeant Julien Voisin

== History ==
Music in the fire services of Paris can be dated as far back to 1811 when drums were incorporated in the ranks of fire units. The music band of the BSPP has its origins in a decree dating back to 27 April 1850, which assigned buglers in each firefighter company. Creations of additional companies in 1855, 1856 and 1859 increased the manpower to 30 sapper-bugles and of a sergeant-bugle. On 31 May 1885, the firemen of Paris were present at the funeral of Victor Hugo, during which the hearse was accompanied by a small music band of firemen on the Place de l'Étoile. In 1915, as the bombardment of the capital was nearing during the winter operations, the regiment received an order from the GMP to alert the population in the event of air raids. Sapeur-pompiers sounded bugle calls throughout the city whenever this alarm was given. On Bastille Day in 1937, a corps of drums joined the bugles and in 1944 a full military band was established to celebrate the Liberation of Paris. In 1950, the regimental brass band became the official regimental band and then the brigade band on 1 March 1967.

== Logistics organization ==
Since 2011, the BSPP's band has had a special truck utilized exclusively for transporting its musical instruments. It is a registered SPCT46 and is built on the basis of a heavyweight Renault Midlum 270.

== See also ==
- French Foreign Legion Music Band (MLE)
- Republican Guard (France)
- French Republican Guard Band
