= Police academy =

Training school for police recruits

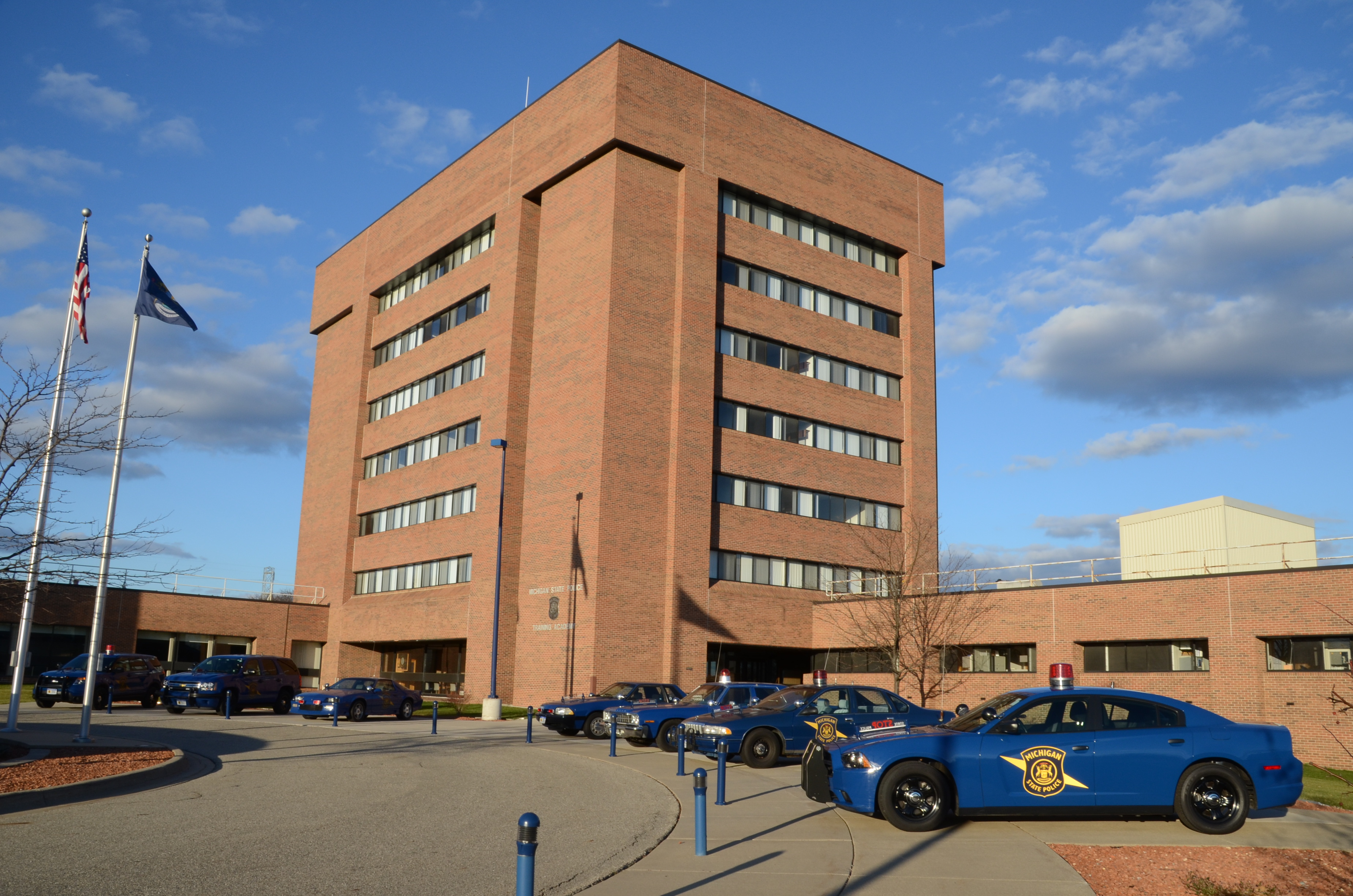
The exterior of the Michigan State Police Training Academy in Michigan, United States

A police academy, also known as a law enforcement training center, police college, or police university, is a training school for police cadets, designed to prepare them for the law enforcement agency they will be joining upon graduation, or to otherwise certify an individual as a law enforcement officer, typically a police officer.

Police academies train cadets on skills and tactics required to properly and effectively conduct their duties. These include legal training, driving skills, equipment training, firearm training, use of force, crisis negotiation, and de-escalation, among others. Typical facilities in a police academy include classrooms, vehicle courses, shooting ranges, running tracks, gyms, and recreational facilities, though some may also include dormitories, cafeterias, training simulators, police museums, and police-affiliated businesses such as restaurants and stores.

Police training varies in important ways around the world, with significant differences in program content, format, and instructional methods. Police academies are not used solely by police cadets, and some are also used regularly by sworn officers, other law enforcement agencies, special units such as SWAT, and occasionally even civilians and other non-law enforcement personnel; for example, the 1932 Summer Olympics used the Los Angeles Police Academy's range for their shooting event.

The requirements to join a police department and attend a police academy vary by jurisdiction. Most of the time, these requirements include background checks, physical, mental, and medical exams, as well as criminal record checks.

== Approaches to police instruction ==
Training prepares police officers with the knowledge and skills to apply contemporary standards of policing. In some countries, police education consists of an extensive process over many years. In other countries, police receive as little as 5 to 8 months of education. Most police education includes some time spent on field training, which is a supervised practicum supported by a field training officer (FTO). Police academies adhere to policies for the selection and recruitment of instructors, stress-management training, community-oriented leadership and policing training, specialist training, supervisory and management training, and liability issues associated with training.

=== History of police education ===
From the early 1800s through the early to middle 1900s, policing was conceptualized as a form of physical labor, and on-the-job training was the norm. In the middle of the 20th century, police work became more professional, but this changed a lot depending on national and local culture and politics. The "good government" ethos of the 20th century emphasized that police should be hired competitively based on merit, and entrance tests became standard practice. In some countries, the rights of due process advanced to the point where it is necessary for police to have an understanding of the law and legal reasoning. After riots and other problems in the late 20th century, community policing methods were created to show how important social skills and knowledge of social science are. The rise of gun violence also affected police training programs, which placed more and more emphasis on the use of weapons and defensive tactics.

=== Classroom and field training ===
Police training occurs in classroom settings, on the shooting range, in the gym, and in the field. In the classroom, recruits learn the basics of law, procedures, radio codes, penal codes, etc. This type of instruction often involves formal testing, in which recruits must pass each exam with a certain minimum score. On the shooting range and in the gym, hands-on and scenario-based activities include arrest and control, defensive tactics, the use of weapons, and driving. Recruits must demonstrate proficiency in these skills. In the U.S., the President's Task Force on 21st Century Policing recommended incorporating the following in topics in basic recruit and in-service trainings: policing in a democratic society; implicit bias and cultural responsiveness; social interaction skills and tactical skills; addiction; crisis intervention (mental health); policies on sexual misconduct and sexual harassment; and how to work with the LGBTQ community. They also said that training innovation hubs should be set up and that community members should be included in police training. Overall police training has also gone through a shift from vocational training to greater emphasis on academic courses. One of the intentions is to mitigate the powerful social impact of police culture, in particular the blue wall of silence. Some states are moving towards a more inclusive training culture, for instance, all Florida police officers must complete a minimum of 770 hours of state-mandated training during their initial certification, which includes training in diversity.

=== Uses of video as a training tool ===
Videos are used as a recruiting tool to engage people to apply for police training, and in attracting interest and attention, they may use action, humor, pathos or other techniques to encourage people's curiosity about policing as a career choice.

Videos may be effective in improving learners' knowledge, developing attention, reflection, and noticing skills, but the educational value of video depends upon the characteristics of the medium, content, and the learner's mental effort and expectations for learning. Video has six functions in police education to support the development of sworn officers.

In the classroom, watching and talking about videos can help people learn to pick out and pay attention to the most important parts of complicated situations. For example, students may view a video of an interaction between police and citizens, learning to able to recognize the point at which information has been gathered to establish probable cause or suspicion to justify the officer's initial action. Such activities also may sharpen the ability to interpret and reflect on what is noticed based on one's own professional knowledge and experience using description, explanation, and prediction. In policing, learning from video may cultivate systematic observation procedures that transfer to direct observation in the field. Because video provides a permanent recording that captures the complexity of social interactions, learners can examine an action with multiple objectives and from different perspectives. Learners can also stop the tape and review certain segments, focusing on specific details.

Video viewing and discussion activities cultivates professional vision. A concept used to describe the distinctive ability shared by members of a professional group to see and understand events central to their work. This is because video facilitates a shift from an individual dimension to a collective one in observation, since the same video can be shared by different observers, enabling analysis from multiple perspectives. Because viewers bring a variety of different kinds of life experiences and prior knowledge to the task of viewing video, what they notice and the meanings they infer from the video will vary greatly. For this reason, instructional practices that involve viewing and discussion need to elaborate their purposes with clear and concrete task structures and designs.

==== Learning from body-worn camera footage (BWC) ====
Video has become increasingly important in law enforcement, and society has accepted a variety of forms of surveillance because of its value in both increasing police accountability and preventing crime. In a study of more than 700 police chiefs, researchers found that police chiefs with higher levels of trust in their officers were more willing to disclose raw video footage from body-worn cameras to the general public. Body-worn camera footage can be valuable for police training and supporting officer learning, particularly in situations where behaviors fall short of professionalism. But dashcams and body-worn cameras may also inadvertently increase the use of force incidents and reduce the time that the police spend on de-escalating a situation.

==== Demonstrations and how-to videos ====
Other types of videos can also provide visual and real-life examples of important policing concepts and police instructors often use video ftoconveyiimportant information and ideas, demonstrating how to use equipment, tactics, and procedures, enhaneg situational awareness, and evenbettern understang the local community. Short clips from news and entertainment programs can help address important cultural and social dimensions of police/citizen encounters, and these videos are easily accessed through social media posts and video-sharing websites. Some officers see the video training materials used in police education as so boring that they are tempted to not watch them, which is a form of cheating.

==== Controversies about videos used in police training ====
Many police recruits have entertainment-based perceptions about crime and law enforcement, and their world views may be shaped by copaganda, or entertainment media's distorted depictions of police activity. Police training videos can also reinforce harmful stereotypes. Communities concerned about police abuse of power have examined the content and format of videos used in police academies as part of police reform initiatives. In Austin, as members of the community reviewed videos used for police education, they noticed patterns that troubled them. The videos used for police instruction included many with content that included an "us-versus-them" bias that focused exclusively on officer safety that neglected to consider the safety of the community as a whole. Videos depicted officers as “good guys” and the public they interact with as “bad guys,” offering a view of the profession as primarily concerned with exercising and maintaining control, where officers are agents of control and the public stands in need of being controlled.

== Academies by country ==
Police academies worldwide have standards and training methods that vary wildly depending on the country and level of police.

== See also ==
- Police training officer
- Field training officer
- Field training program
- Military academy
- Recruit training
