= Caserne Champerret =

Headquarters of the Paris Fire Brigade

Coordinates: 48.8845°N 2.2888°E

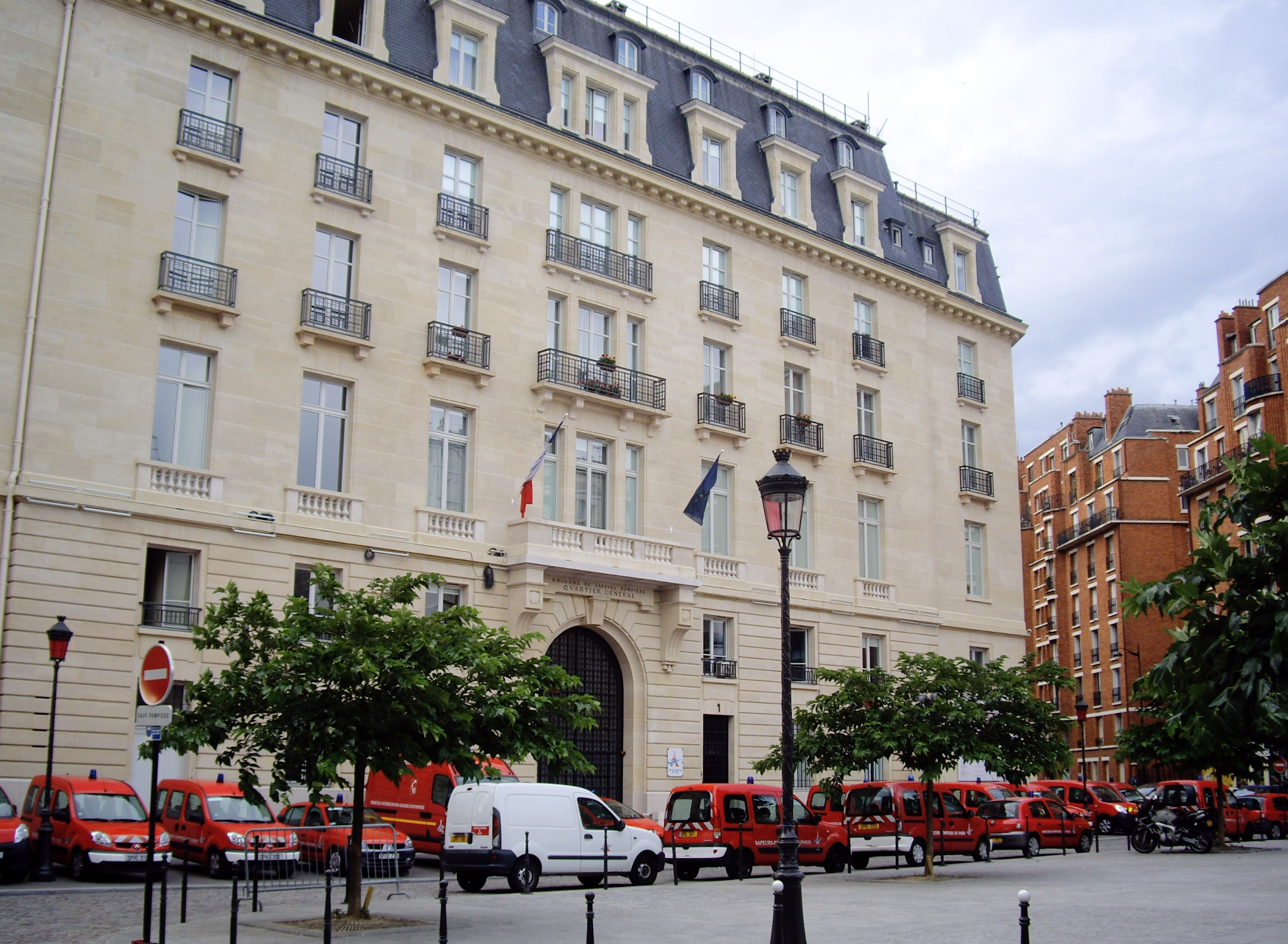
Champerret barrack.

The Champerret barrack is a building located in the 17th arrondissement of Paris, France. It houses the HQ of the Paris Fire Brigade, but also a fire station of the 5th fire and rescue company. Champerret barrack is also home to a museum, called: Espace Mémoire.

Paris Fire Brigade being a military entity, Champerret barrack is therefore considered a building under the Ministry of Armed Forces.
