= Field training officer =

Senior member of an organization responsible for the training of a junior member

A field training officer (FTO) is an experienced or senior member of an organization who is responsible for the training and evaluation of a junior or probationary level member. The role is used extensively in law enforcement, fire departments, and emergency medical services.

== Qualifications ==
FTOs usually receive specialized classroom training and certification to meet state requirements (such as POST, TCLEOSE or EMT) before performing field training duties for the department they work for.

== Function ==
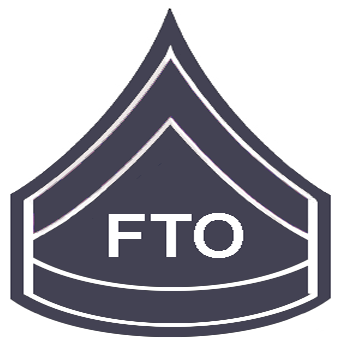
Some FTOs wear distinguishing insignia, such as this insignia used by the Chicago Police Department.

A new trainee is usually only allowed to work with an FTO for a predetermined amount of time, or until the field training staff determines that they are ready to work on their own. Field training for police officers typically lasts 12 to 18 weeks, In some instances the trainee may work for a short amount of time prior to attending a formal training-certification program. During this time the FTO may complete part or the majority of the FTO program and then complete the remaining upon completion of the certification process.

It is also not unusual for a trainee to have multiple field training officers that they rotate around to. For instance, in some law enforcement agencies a trainee may spend several weeks on each shift or in each specialty area of a department, during which time they could have multiple FTOs.

== Duties ==
The duties of an FTO involve being a role model, clearly communicating the expectations of training, teaching the trainee the policies of the department, correctly applying concepts learned in the classroom to field training operations, and evaluating the trainee on his or her progress in the program. Ultimately, an FTO is responsible for making sure shift duties are performed properly and completely.

== Burnout ==
Addressing the concept of "burnout" in FTOs is a fairly recent development. Burnout can begin as a loss of interest in a task or boredom. Eventually, if left untreated, burnout can result in loss of productivity, low morale, substance abuse, and mental illness.

It is not known whether burnout affects FTOs more than regular employees.

Many agencies and profession-related articles have begun to formally address the effect.

== Industry ==
The role of FTO is also common among large corporations who elect to develop their own trainers as opposed to hiring professional corporate trainers from outside the company.
