= Petit-Clamart attack =

1962 attempted assassination of French President Charles de Gaulle

- Bullet holes shown on the exterior of de Gaulle's vehicle. Despite being riddled with bullets, nobody in the car was injured.
- Location: 48°46′44″N 2°14′07″E; Clamart, Seine, Paris Region, France
- Date: 22 August 1962
- Target: Charles de Gaulle
- Attack type: Assassination attempt
- Deaths: 0
- Injuries: 1 (Panhard driver, caught in crossfire)
- Perpetrator: Organisation armée secrète: Jean Bastien-Thiry (organizer)
- No. of participants: 18
- Motive: Anti-communism and opposition to French recognition of Algerian sovereignty
- Verdict: 1 participant (Jean Bastien-Thiry) executed by firing squad; All other participants eventually released
- Convictions: 3 participants sentenced to death; 10+ participants sentenced to various prison terms

The Petit-Clamart attack, also referred to by its perpetrators as Operation Charlotte Corday after assassin Charlotte Corday, was an assassination attempt organized by Lieutenant-Colonel Jean Bastien-Thiry with the Organisation armée secrète (OAS) that aimed to kill Charles de Gaulle, president of France at the time. The attack was carried out on 22 August 1962.

No one was killed and one person, who was caught in the crossfire, was injured during the attack, which was followed by an intensive investigation led by French authorities. The manhunt ended with almost all participants being caught within a few months. Bastien-Thiry was brought before a military court where he justified his act by claiming that de Gaulle was a tyrant. Bastien-Thiry was sentenced to death and executed by firing squad in the spring of 1963, and remains the last person to be executed by firing squad in France.

== Background ==
=== 1958–1959 ===
In May 1958, in Algiers, a coup was carried out jointly by Pierre Lagaillarde, who was the sitting Deputy of Algiers and a reserve paratrooper officer, generals Raoul Salan, Edmond Jouhaud, and Jean Gracieux, and Admiral Auboyneau, with the support of General Jacques Massu and Jacques Soustelle's allies.

Its aim was to allow Charles de Gaulle, who was then retired, to return to power. The supporters of de Gaulle were banking on a radical change in government policy based on maintaining the integrity of the republican territory, and therefore the continuation of "pacification" in the French departments of Algeria that had been policy since 1954.

After reassuring a European and Muslim Gaullist crowd fraternizing in Algiers on 4 June 1958, saying, "I understand you" and, "Long live French Algeria" in Mostaganem, de Gaulle, once he became President of the Republic in 1959, undertook to complete the decolonization policy that he had initiated in 1943 with Lebanon and Syria during his campaign to rally the colonies to Free France with a view to liberating those parts of continental France occupied by Hitler. Later, on 2 October 1958, de Gaulle granted independence to Guinea following its rejection of the new constitution.

On 16 September 1959, when de Gaulle used the term "self-determination" for the first time in relation to what the media was then calling "the Algerian affair", some protested, interpreting the policy reversal by the head of state, whom they had helped to return to power, as a "betrayal".

=== 1960 ===
On 24 January 1960, extremist defenders of French control of Algeria carried out a siege in the Algerian capital, then the second largest city in France, in what would become known as the "week of the barricades". Jacques Massu was transferred to mainland France after making statements to West Germany's Süddeutsche Zeitung newspaper. The dismissal of the man who had allowed the "Gaullist putsch" of 1958 triggered what the media would describe as "the events in Algiers".

=== 1961 ===
In February 1961, Lagaillarde and Salan, who had also gone underground, created the Organisation armée secrète ("Secret Army Organization"), commonly known as OAS.

In April 1961, a putsch was organized by four retired generals—Salan, Jouhaud, Maurice Challe, and André Zeller—who were opposed to secret negotiations that the French government had started with the anti-colonialist National Liberation Front (FLN). The coup was aimed at overthrowing de Gaulle and replacing his authority with a military junta. It lasted nearly a week, but was unsuccessful.

Thereafter, the OAS increased its clandestine operations. These actions, the most radical of which involved political assassination and terrorism, were carried out both in the French departments of Algeria and in mainland France, the OAS having a "Metro" branch, by the "Commando Delta".

OAS logo at the time of the attack

=== 1962 ===
On 20 May 1962 in Italy, Georges Bidault, former Minister of Foreign Affairs under de Gaulle, then during the Indochina War, was elected president of the National Council of the Resistance (Conseil National de la Résistance; CNR) by the executive committee, which included Jacques Soustelle and Colonel Antoine Argoud. Bidault had held the position of president of the council following Jean Moulin in 1943. Several analysts criticize the amalgam practiced by the founders of the council of 1962, an amalgam which suggests a possible equivalence between Algeria and Alsace-Lorraine, as well as an identification of de Gaulle to Adolf Hitler.

== Attack ==
Map of Paris and its inner ring départements, with Clamart highlighted in red

On 22 August 1962, at around 7:45 pm (UTC+1), two unmarked Citroën DS 19s escorted by two motorcyclists left the Élysée Palace to take de Gaulle and his wife Yvonne to the Villacoublay Air Base, from which they would travel by air to Saint-Dizier and then by road to their home in Colombey-les-Deux-Églises. De Gaulle was returning from a meeting of the Council of Ministers. In the first car were Charles and Yvonne De Gaulle, as well as Colonel Alain de Boissieu, son-in-law and aide-de-camp of the president, who was seated next to the driver, Gendarme Francis Marroux. In the second car, led by police brigadier René Casselin, were the police commissioner Henri Puissant, bodyguard Henri Djouder, and military doctor Jean-Denis Degos.

Leaving Paris via the Châtillon-Montrouge Station, the procession took Route nationale 306 and headed towards Vélizy-Villacoublay, where the presidential plane was waiting. When he arrived, at 8:20 pm, at the crossroads of rue Charles-Debry, RN 306, and rue du Bois, approximately 300 metres (980 ft) before the Petit Clamart roundabout, the Bastien-Thiry group was waiting in several parked vehicles.

The assassination squad was composed of 12 members, including Jean Bastien-Thiry, Alain de La Tocnaye, László Varga, Lajos Marton, and Gyula Sári, all of whom were fiercely anti-communist. The rest of the group was made up of Metropolitians and pieds-noirs. The latter intended to avenge the abuses committed against their community, in particular the 1962 Isly massacre, which left 80 dead and 200 injured, as well as the loss of French Algeria. The members of the squad were equipped with automatic weapons and explosives, and had four vehicles at their disposal.

Bastien-Thiry was hidden in a Simca 1000 and gave the signal to fire by waving a newspaper. Five men (Buisines, Varga, Sári, Bernier, and Marton), armed with automatic weapons, were in a yellow Renault Estafette; La Tocnaye was in a Citroën ID 19 with Georges Watin and Prévost, equipped with submachine guns. The final vehicle was a Peugeot 403 van in which Condé, Magade and Bertin, also with automatic weapons, were hiding.

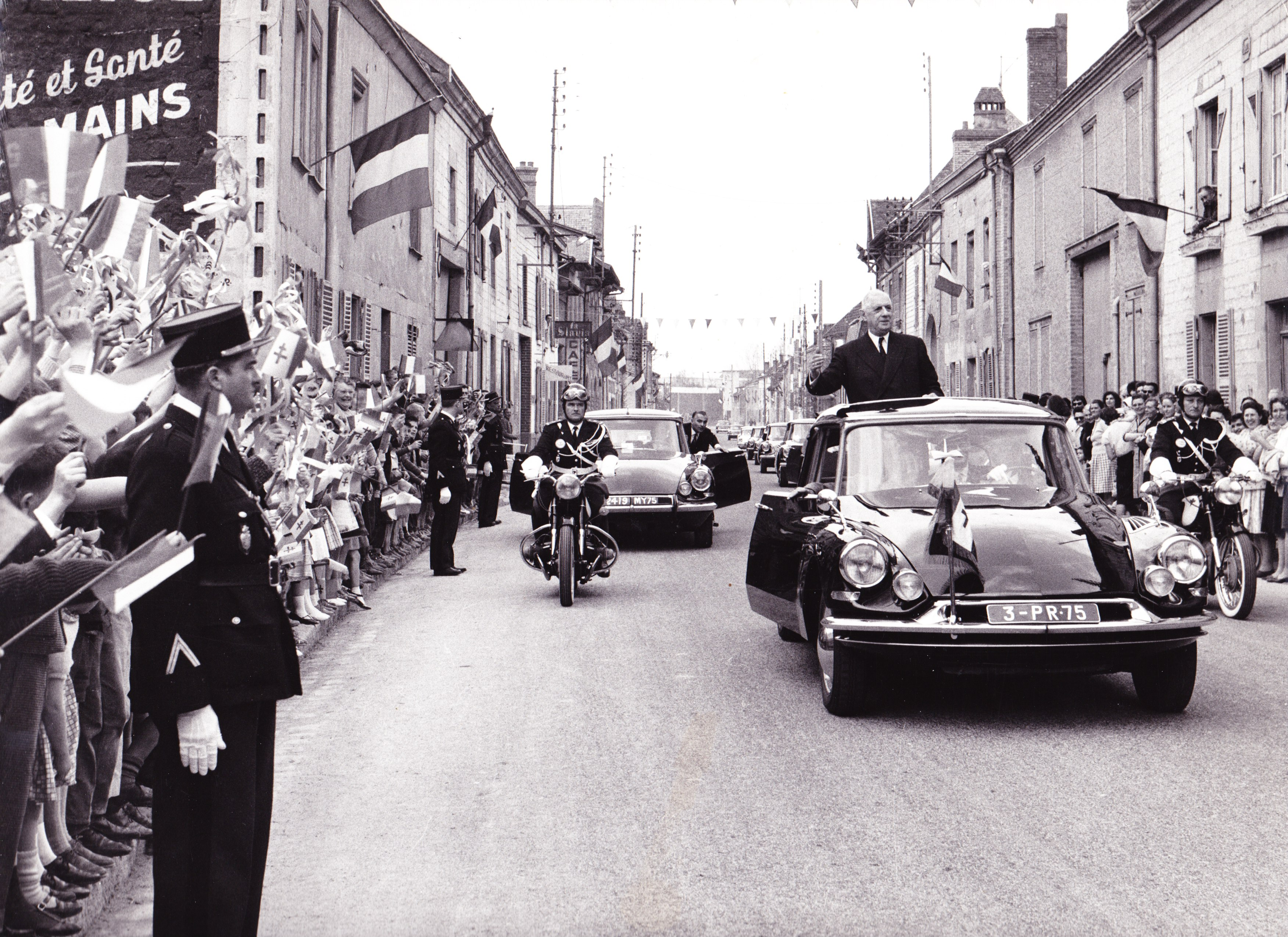
Charles de Gaulle during a motorcade in 1963, the year after the attack

Of the 187 rounds fired by the squad, 14 hits were observed on the presidential vehicle, including one in the front passenger backrest where de Boissieu was sitting, and several at the level of the faces of the de Gaulles. At the scene of the attack, several stores were riddled with bullet holes. Realizing that his colleagues had missed their target, Gérard Buisines tried to ram the presidential car with the Estafette, while Alain de La Tocnaye, hanging out the door, tried to shoot at de Gaulle with a machine-gun.

Upon arrival at Villacoublay Air Base, the general remarked to the greeting party: "Cette fois c’était tangent" ("This time it was close"). To the surprise of the police in attendance, Yvonne de Gaulle said "J'espère que les poulets n'ont rien eu" ("I hope nothing happened to the chickens"), referring to some frozen poultry she had placed in the baggage compartment of the car. In response de Gaulle whispered to her, as she sat next to him on the flight, "Vous êtes brave Yvonne" ("You are brave, Yvonne").

During the attack a Panhard automobile, in which a couple and their three children were driving by on the opposite side of the road, came under fire from the shooters. The driver suffered minor injuries.

== Investigation ==
=== Manhunt ===
An extensive manhunt for the perpetrators of the attack was launched on the evening of 22 August. The investigation initially focused on the yellow Estafette, with several witnesses saying that one of its three occupants was limping. The police thought they recognized Watin, a member of the OAS known as la Boîteuse ("the Limper"), but did not succeed in apprehending him. Two men were arrested by chance at a Tain-l'Hermitage road checkpoint. One was a deserter who bragged, "I’m from the OAS." Transferred to the Regional Judicial Police Service in Lyon, he admitted to Commissioner Geneston that he was part of the assassination squad. Transferred to Paris, he continued his confession, giving Commissioner Bouvier all the names or nicknames of the conspirators that he knew.

After two weeks, around 15 suspects, some developing a new operation targeting de Gaulle, were arrested by Divisional Commissioner Bouvier's men. The last arrest was that of Bastien-Thiry as he left his home in Bourg-la-Reine on 15 September. Another suspect, OAS commander and retired French Army major Henri Niaux, hanged himself in prison the same day.

=== Trial ===
The trial was held at the Fort of Vincennes. During the first session, nine accused commando members appeared before the Military Court of Justice on 28 January 1963: Jean-Marie Bastien-Thiry defended by Jean-Louis Tixier-Vignancour, Alain de La Tocnaye, Pascal Bertin, Gérard Buisines, Alphonse Constantin, Étienne Ducasse, Pierre-Henri Magade, Jacques Prévost and László Varga. Six other defendants were tried in absentia; those absent, on the run, were Serge Bernier, Louis de Condé, Gyula Sári, Lajos Marton, Jean-Pierre Naudin, and Georges Watin. The latter had fled to Switzerland where he was arrested in January 1964 and was held in solitary confinement to prevent him escaping from French authorities. False papers were provided to him, and he reached South America with those documents. He died in Paraguay in 1994. All of the accused were charged with attempted intentional homicide by ambush and attack against state authority with the use of weapons.

This Military Court of Justice had been declared illegal by the Conseil d'État on 19 October 1962, on the grounds that it infringed the general principles of law by the absence of any appeal against its decisions. Despite this, de Gaulle extended the existence of the Court for this case. However, this Court, which was to be replaced by another jurisdiction, the State Security Court, was extended by the law of 26 February 1963.

On 4 March, at the end of the investigation against Bastien-Thiry, the Military Court of Justice found him guilty of orchestrating the attack. Tried as separate perpetrators, the shooters were sentenced to various prison terms and benefited from a presidential pardon in 1968. Jean-Marie Bastien-Thiry, Alain de la Tocnaye and Jacques Prévost, defended by Jacques Isorni, were all sentenced to death. Two of the condemned were pardoned; only Bastien-Thiry was executed, shot by a firing squad at Fort Ivry on 11 March 1963. The five absent accused were sentenced in absentia to death sentences or imprisonment and also benefit from a presidential pardon.

=== Bastien-Thiry ===
On 2 February 1963, following brief statements by the co-defendants present during the trial, accused of leading Operation Charlotte Corday, Jean-Marie Bastien-Thiry, made a lengthy speech pleading self-defense of himself and his "comrades" from "men of power" and in particular against the most powerful of them, the one whom his lawyer, future presidential candidate Jean-Louis Tixier-Vignancour, nicknamed the "Prince".

Known as the "Bastien-Thiry affair", the declaration, published by René Wittmann first in a private edition on 20 February 1963 and later the same year as a 33-page paper by his Serp, a publication associated with the far right, began with these words:

The action for which we are answering before you today is of an exceptional nature, and we ask you to believe that only reasons of an equally exceptional nature could have induced us to undertake it. We are neither fascists nor factionalists, but national French, French by origin or French at heart. It is the misfortunes of the homeland that have led us to these benches.

— René Wittmann

The trial inspired works from the 1960s to the present day, whether it be criticism of the death penalty, French public opinion then being predominantly unfavorable, or testimonies. The condemned man's family has since worked for his rehabilitation through the "Bastien-Thiry circle" or counter-investigations. In Bastien-Thiry: to the end of French Algeria by Jean-Pax Méfret, a senior reporter, asks: "How could a man, endowed with deep Catholic convictions and superior cultural background, have come to this?".

Discussions in the national press tended to focus on three points: the virulence of Bastien-Thiry's criticism of de Gaulle's policies regarding Algeria; the fact that the condemned were finally pardoned with one exception; and the expeditious nature of the sentence. The day after the execution, in L'Express, journalist Jean Daniel wrote, "In fact, the inhumanity of the sovereign ends up overwhelming even his supporters". In Le Canard enchaîné, Jérôme Gauthier wrote, "It’s shame that tears down walls. A certain justice too, it seems... [...] Lieutenant-Colonel Bastien-Thiry died, I do not say mourned, but pitied by a very large number of French people, even among those the most fiercely hostile to his cause."

== Theories ==
=== Mole ===
According to authors such as Jean-Pax Méfret and member of the commando Lajos Marton, the conspirators said they had benefited from support within the Élysée from Commissioner Jacques Cantelaube. He had been the sitting controller general of the police and director of security for the president and resigned shortly before the attack. He felt antipathy towards the president due to his conduct of Algerian affairs from 1959. This accomplice would have allowed Bastien-Thiry to know the registration of the presidential vehicle, the structure of the convoy and the routes that would be taken by the convoy, including the one that will be chosen at the last moment as a security measure. According to Jean Lacouture:

"[...] thanks to the information, said the leader of the conspirators, of a "mole" that he had within the Élysée: but the countless speculations made on this subject did not lead to any serious information. It seems that Bastien-Thiry, on this level, bluffed, to panic or divide the general's entourage. In fact, it was based on telephone calls from lookouts placed around the Élysée – notably from a certain "Pierre" – as soon as a trip by the head of state was planned".

In 2015, Marton revived the hypothesis of the involvement of the Minister of Finance, Valéry Giscard d'Estaing, who, under the code name "B12", would have informed the OAS of de Gaulle's movements.

=== Objective of the attack ===
There is an alternative and controversial thesis that the primary aim of the operation was not to assassinate President Charles de Gaulle in Clamart, but to kidnap him to bring him before the Council tribunal. Tixier-Vignancour used this as an argument to acquit the nine conspirators present during the trial. Subsequently, it was taken up and defended by Agnès de Marnhac in her book Mon pere, le dernier des fusilles (English: My father, the last of the executed) published by Michalon on 7 April 2005 under her maiden name, Agnès Bastien-Thiry. A psychogenealogist and therapist by profession, she also supported a thesis based on psychogenealogy according to which: "by donating his life, my father redeemed the fault of his ancestor the Duke of Massa who had sent an innocent man, the Duke of Enghien, to the firing squad." Agnès de Marnhac died on 28 June 2007 from cancer. This thesis of the kidnapping was denied in the media in 2005 (including the daily newspaper Présent and the talk show program Tout le monde en parole) by the very members of the Petit-Clamart commando including Louis Honorat de Condé, Lajos Marton and Armand Belvisi.

=== Head of the attack ===
Marton said that, in 1961, Bastien-Thiry contacted Colonel Antoine Argoud, disgraced since the "week of the barricades", who had been appointed to a "closet" post in Metz, where he spent most of his time preparing the putsch of 1961. Despite sympathizing with Bastien-Thiry, Argoud could not risk of being associated with him or helping him assassinate de Gaulle. He saw Bastien-Thiry again in 1961. Bastien-Thiry subsequently made contact with Jean Bichon, a former resistance fighter and liaison officer between the "Old Staff" and the high command of the OAS.

In his book L' Attentat: indicatif Écho-Gabriel (English: The Attack: code Echo/Gabriel), Belvisi writes, "I contacted the Monocle so that he could give me the weapons I needed. We were the only ones at Mission III to have a large stock of ammunition. Neither the Old General Staff nor Jean Bichon could help Bastien-Thiry. They had almost nothing left... I hid all of this in my studio... and, on 27 April, with Bernier, I went to try them in the woods".

After the putsch of 1961, General Raoul Salan took charge of the OAS with General Edmond Jouhaud as his deputy. On 25 March 1962, Jouhaud was arrested in Oran; and on 20 April 1962 it was Salan's turn to be arrested in Algiers. On 24 April, General Paul Gardy announced on Oran pirate radio (the only transmitter of the OAS) that he was taking his place at the top of the organization chart, but command was also claimed by Jean-Jacques Susini. In fact, General Gardy only exercised complete control over the OAS of Oran. On 20 May 1962, Georges Bidault, in exile in Munich, founded the Council in Milan with Jacques Soustelle.

== Vehicle involved ==
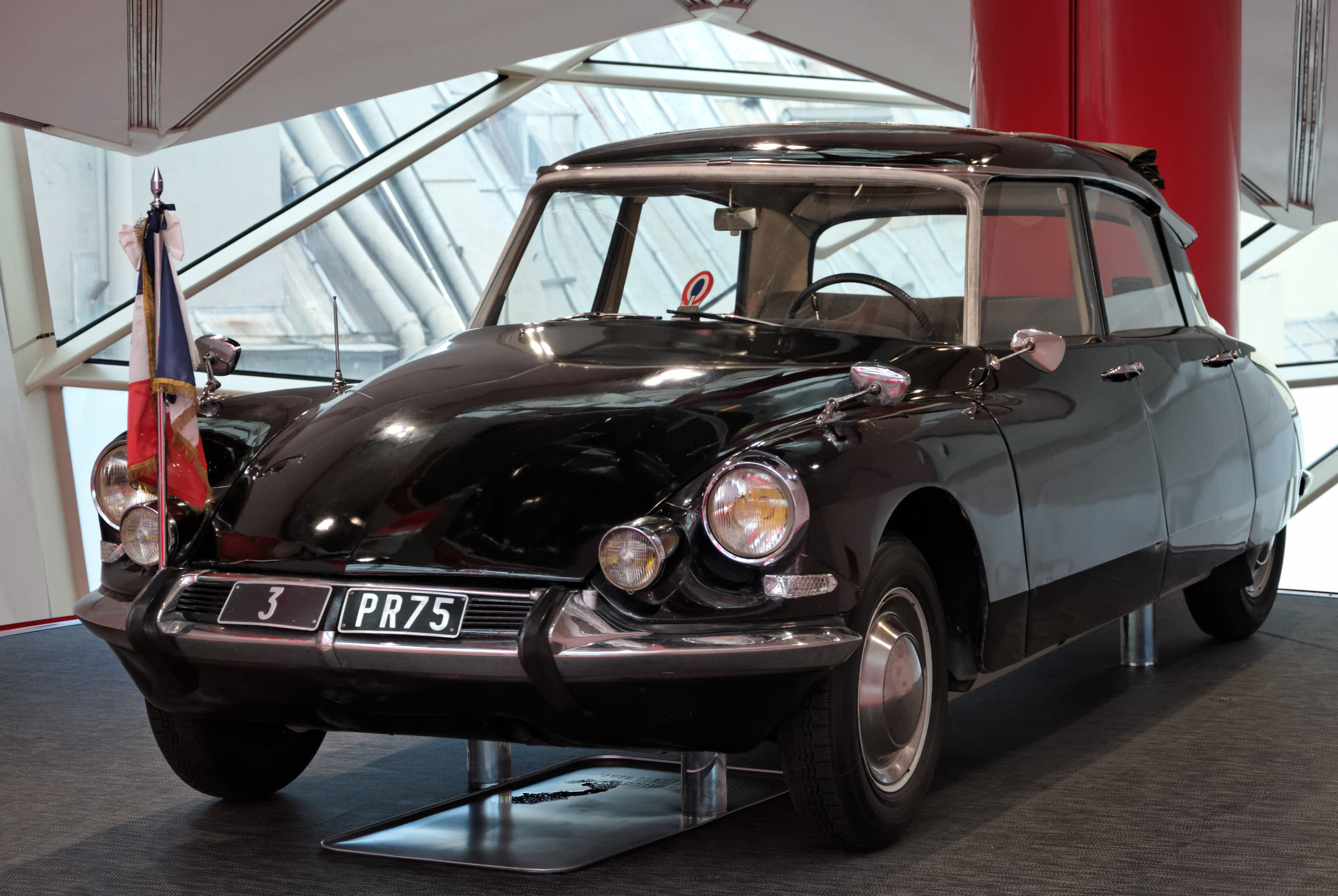
The replica presidential car that de Gaulle and his wife sat in during the attack, as seen on display in 2012. The original vehicle was too damaged to be repaired.

Two years after the attack, the damaged DS 19 was restored; the car was sold on 15 October 1964 to General Robert Dupuy, former military commander of the Élysée. He seriously damaged the vehicle a few years later during an accident with his son during the winter of 1971 near Verdun. In 1980, seven years after the death of Dupuy, his family donated the DS, in very poor condition, to the Charles de Gaulle Institute. Citroën agreed to restore the vehicle free of charge, but it was too damaged.

A replica, presented as the original, made two trips to China, in 2003 and 2013, during traveling exhibitions on the occasion of the 40th and 50th anniversaries of the recognition of the People's Republic of China by France in 1964.

== See also ==
- Murder of the Notorious B.I.G, a 1997 murder that employed similar tactics
- List of people who survived assassination attempts
