= Charles Lacheroy =

French Army officer

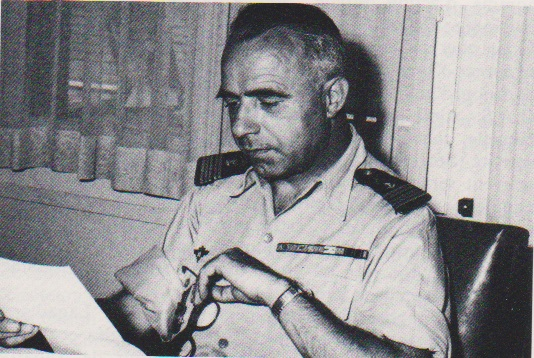
- Born: 22 August 1906; Chalon-sur-Saône, France
- Died: 25 January 2005 (aged 98); Aix-en-Provence, France
- Military career
- Allegiance: France
- Branch: French Army
- Service years: 1927–1960
- Rank: Colonel
- Conflicts: World War II; First Indochina War; Algerian War
- Other work: OAS leader

Charles Lacheroy (22 August 1906 – 25 January 2005) was a French Army officer, theorist of counterinsurgency warfare, and member of the Organisation armée secrète.

== Biography ==
Lacheroy was born to a military family. His father was a decorated infantry second lieutenant (Legion of Honour and Croix de Guerre), killed on 2 August 1916 at Fleury, next to Douaumont fort. Lacheroy was raised by his grandfather, attended the Prytanée National Militaire, and graduated from Saint-Cyr in 1927 among the 20 best students of the promotion (promotion "Maroc-Syrie").

Lacheroy chose the Colonial infantry and obtained a commission as second lieutenant in the 3rd Méhariste company in Levant at Latakia, where he remained until 1935. Promoted to captain, Lacheroy served as instructor for the air group in Rabat from 1936. There, he met Antoine Argoud. Lacheroy married in 1937. From 1941, Lacheroy served in the staff of General de Lattre de Tassigny in Tunisia.

In 1951, he was sent to French Indochina, where he was tasked to protect a railroad to Saigon and secure the sector of Bien Hoa. Promoted to Lieutenant Colonel, Lacheroy was transferred to Paris and made director of the Centre d'études asiatiques et africaines (CEAA). There, he developed a theory of Counter-insurgency warfare, by then known as "psychological action". In 1954, he served as adviser to Defence minister Maurice Bourgès-Maunoury, and Defence minister André Morice in 1956.

In 1958, Lacheroy was dismissed by Jacques Chaban-Delmas and sent to the Constantine Province. On 13 May, he was made director of information and psychological action services in Algiers. In December, he gave conferences at the École supérieure de guerre, and later made director of the École supérieure des officiers de réserve spécialistes d'état-major.

In the early 1960s, Lacheroy resigned his commission to organise a coup d'état against President Charles de Gaulle. For seven years, he lived underground, along with Antoine Argoud, Pierre Lagaillarde and Jo Ortiz, and directed the OAS. He was sentenced to death in absentia in April 1961. Lacheroy was amnestied in 1968. He returned to Paris, where he retired. Charles Lacheroy died on 25 January 2005 in Aix-en-Provence.
