= Claude Piegts =

- Born: 1 January 1934; Castiglione, French Algeria
- Died: 7 June 1962 (aged 28); Fort du Trou-d'Enfer, France
- Organization: Organisation armée secrète
- Status: Executed by firing squad
- Conviction: Murder
- Penalty: Death

Claude Piegts (1 January 1934 – 7 June 1962) was a pied-noir and a member of the Organisation armée secrète (OAS). As a member of the OAS's Commando Delta, Piegts participated in the assassination of the Police Commissar of Algiers, for which he was condemned to death.

== Biography ==
A salesman in Algiers, Claude Piegts belonged to the Commando Delta under the orders of Lieutenant Roger Degueldre during the Algerian War. He participated with Albert Dovecar in the assassination of Police Commissaire Roger Gavoury on 31 May 1961. Piegts was found guilty of the crime and sentenced to death. He was executed by firing squad on 7 June 1962 at the Fort du Trou d'Enfer, along with Dovecar.

Claude Piegts was buried in the cemetery of Le Touvet in Isère, France.
