= Lajos Marton =

Hungarian anti-communist activist (1931–2025)

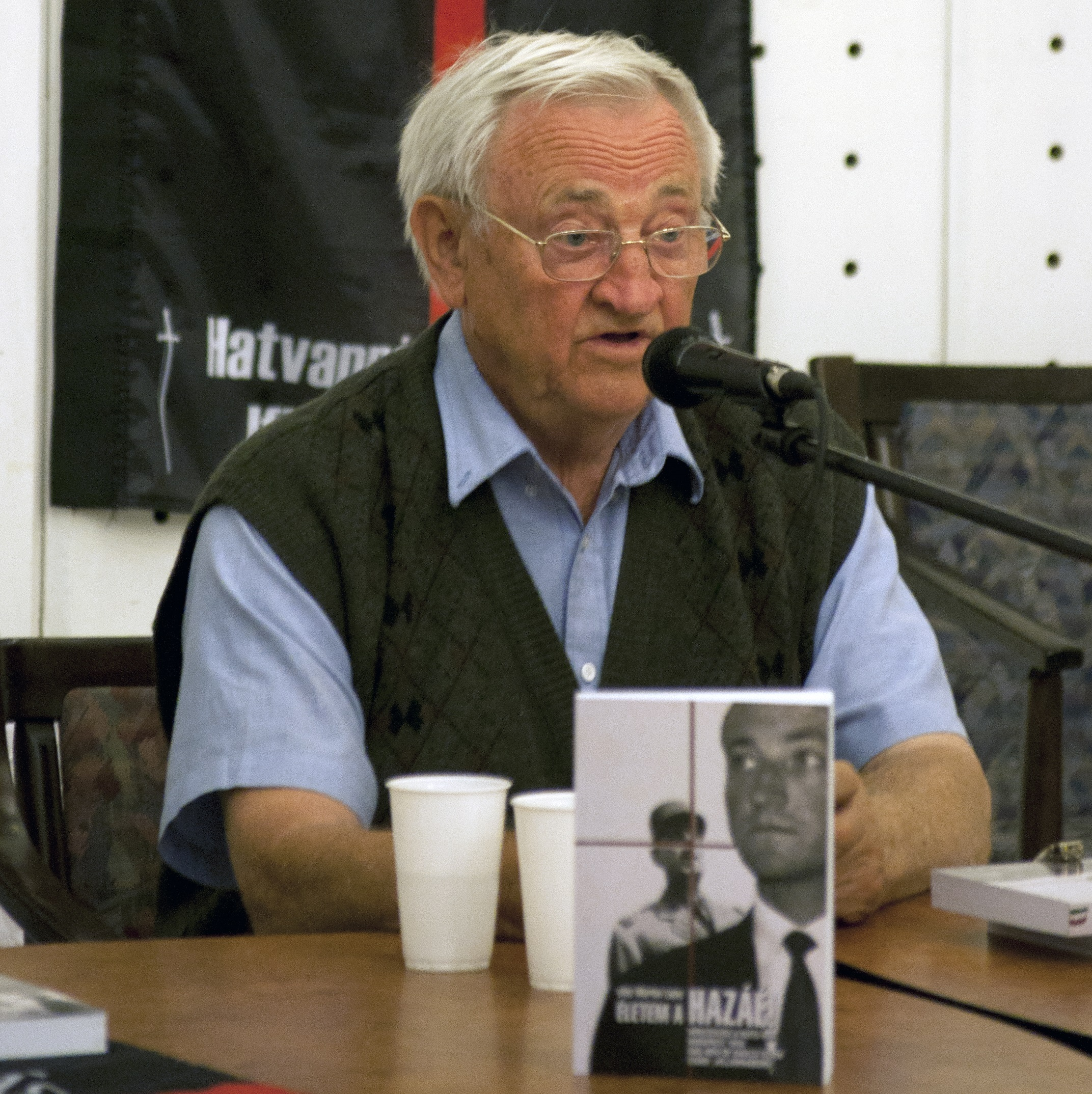
- Marton in 2011
- Born: 27 April 1931; Pósfa, Hungary
- Died: 7 December 2025 (aged 94)
- Occupation: Activist

Lajos Marton (27 April 1931 – 7 December 2025) was a Hungarian anti-communist activist.

After his participation in the Hungarian Revolution of 1956, he fled to France and subsequently participated in Operation Resurrection, which sought to topple the French government and install Charles de Gaulle as president. Then, he took part in the Petit-Clamart attack, which aimed to assassinate Charles de Gaulle in opposition to his recognition of Algerian sovereignty. He went into hiding and was sentenced to death in absentia, but was eventually caught in 1963 before his pardon and release in 1968. In 2005, he gave his testimony on Tout le monde en parle, aired on France 2.

Marton died on 7 December 2025, at the age of 94.

== Works ==
- Il faut tuer de Gaulle (2002)
- Életem a Hazáé (2011)
