= Fort d'Ivry =

- Part of Thiers fortifications of Paris
- Ivry-sur-Seine, France
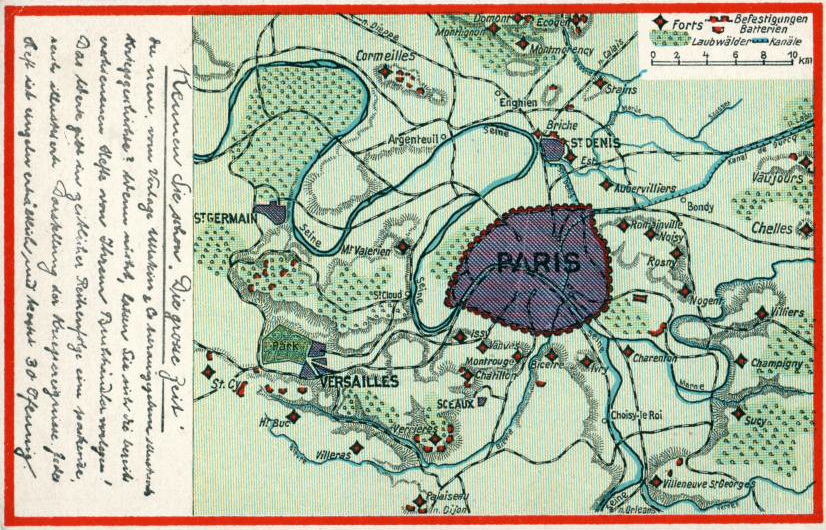
- German post card showing the fortifications of Paris

Site information
- Type: Fort
- Owner: Ministry of Defense
- Controlled by: France
- Condition: Occupied by Ministry of Defense

Location
- Coordinates: 48°48′08″N 2°23′24″E

Site history
- Built: 1841
- Battles/wars: Siege of Paris

Garrison information
- Occupants: ECPAD

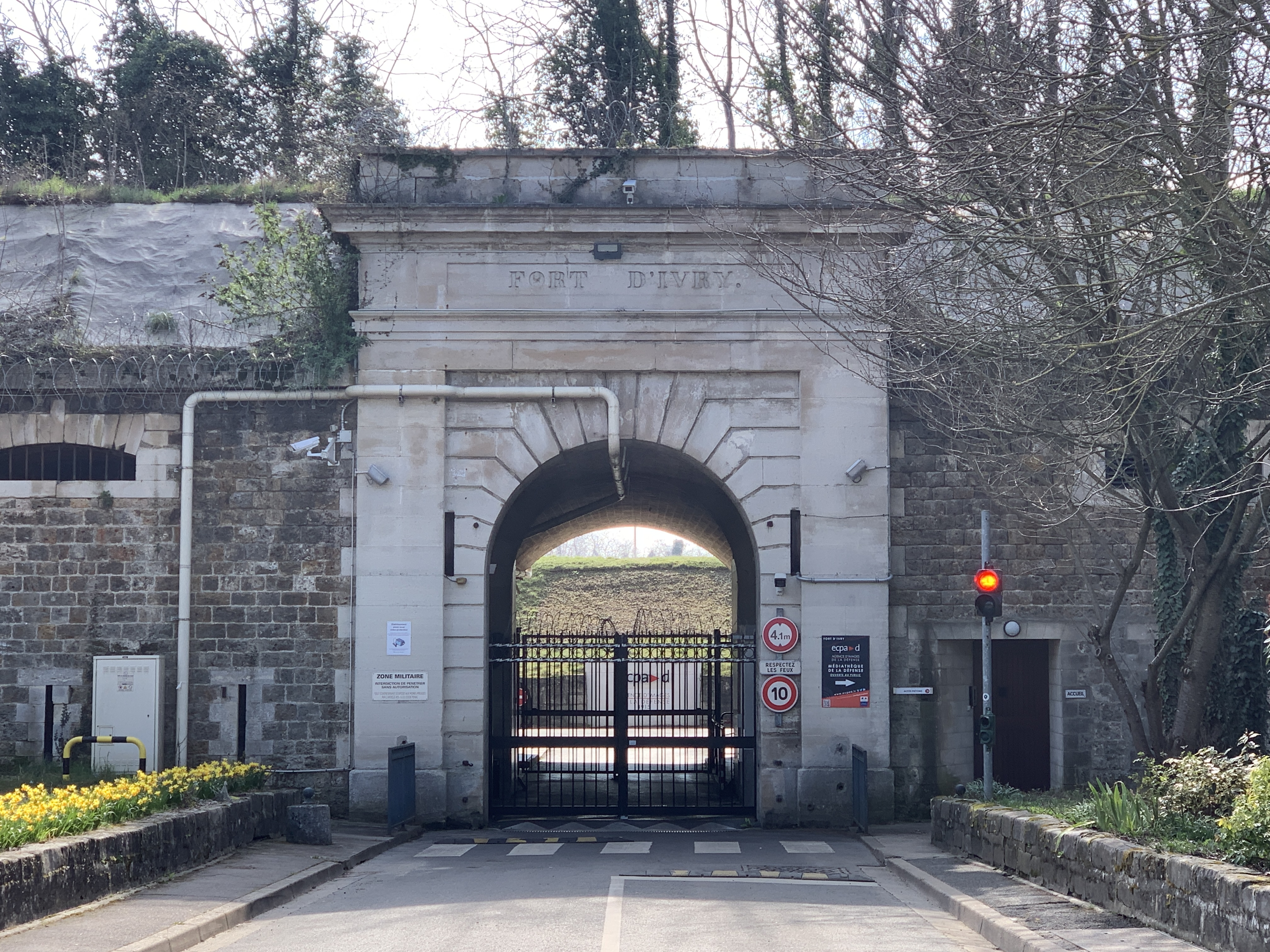
Main gate of Fort d'Ivry

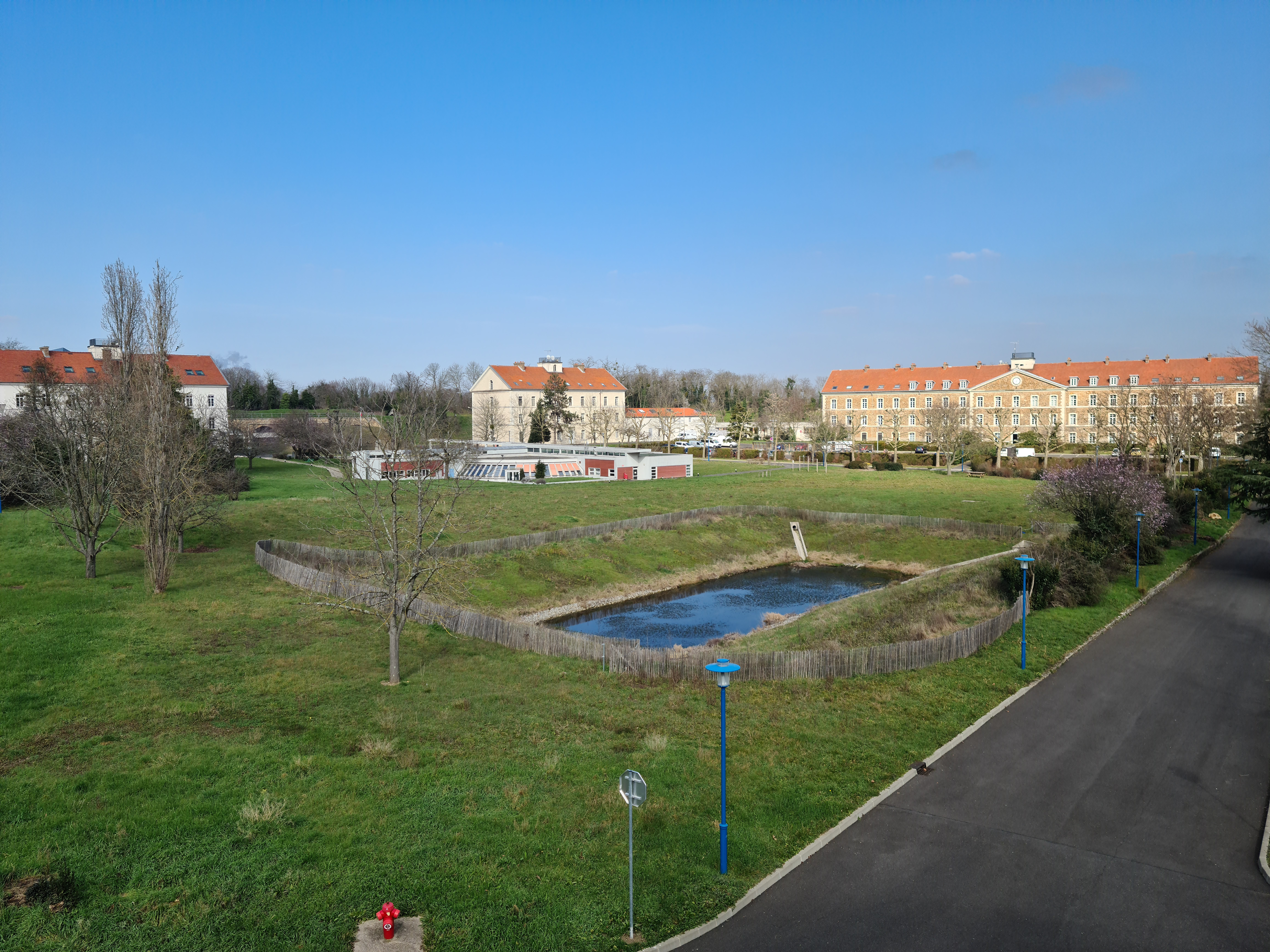
Overview of Fort d'Ivry

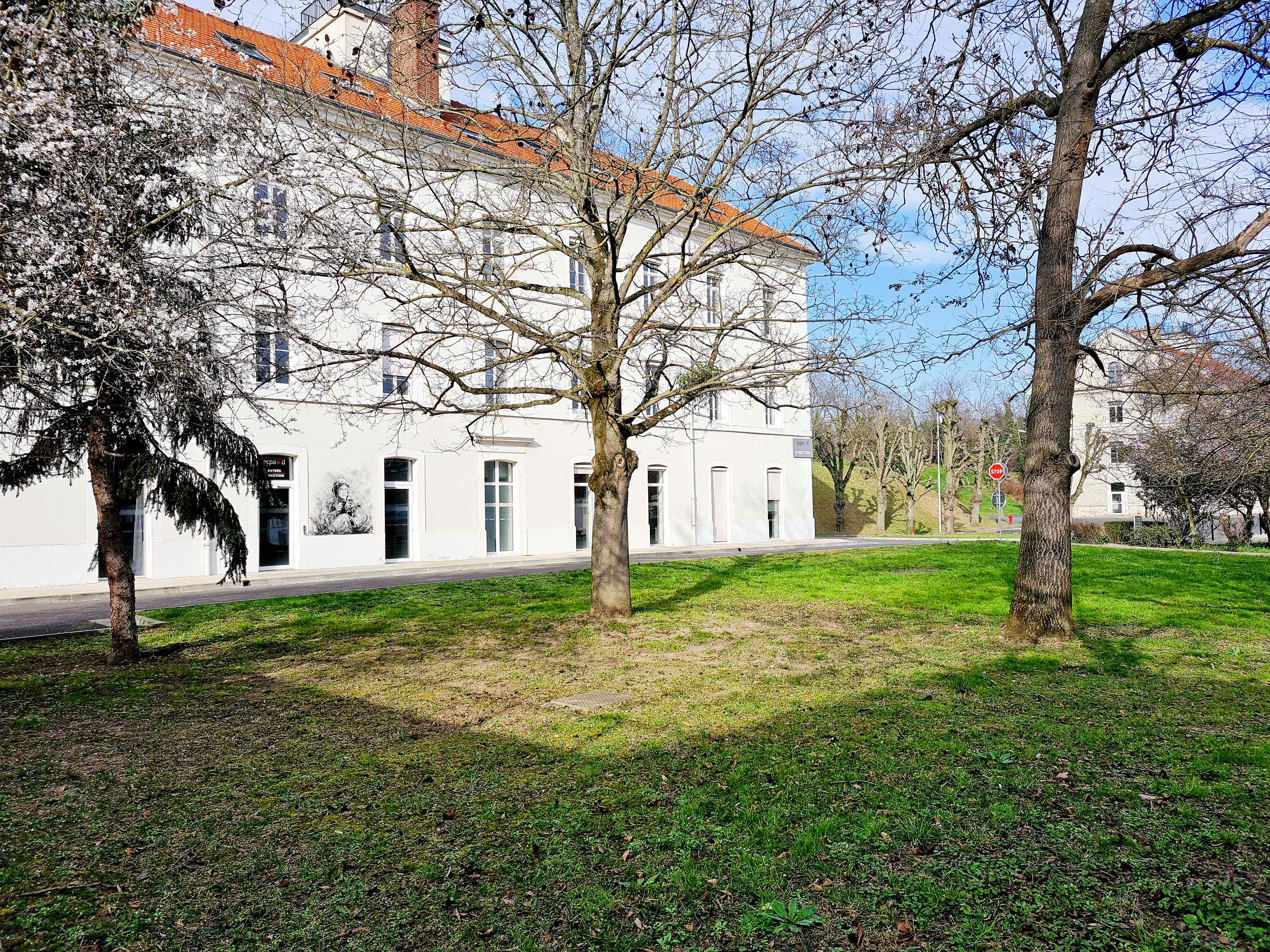
Main building of the ECPAD (Establishment of communication and audiovisual production of Defense)

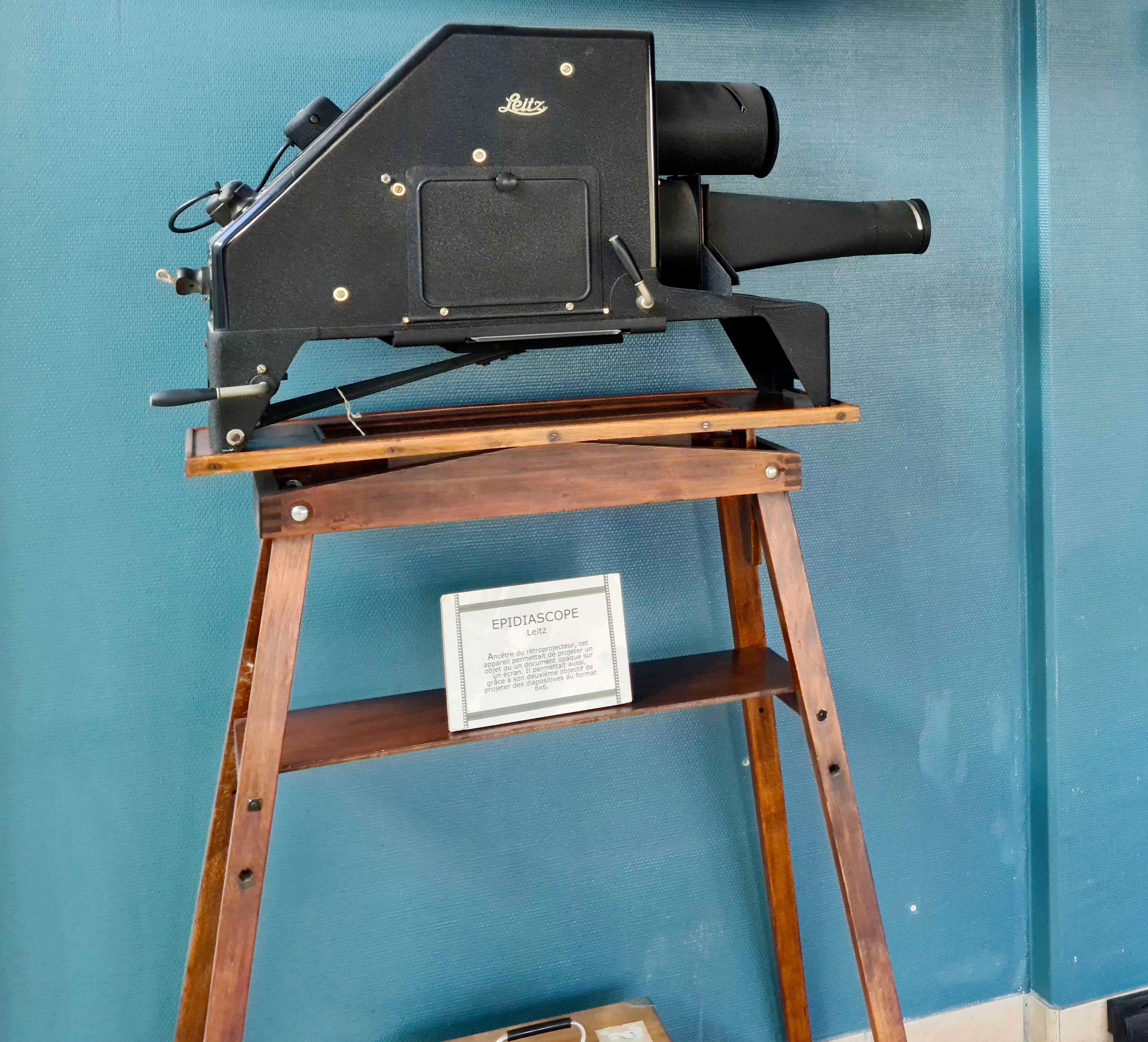
Historical material - Camera used by ECPAD

Main entrance of ECPAD

Fort d'Ivry was built in the Paris suburb of Ivry-sur-Seine between 1841 and 1845, as one of the forts in a ring of strong points surrounding Paris. The fort is about 1 kilometre outside the Thiers Wall, built by the same program in response to a perception that Paris was vulnerable to invasion and occupation. The fort was upgraded in the 1870s, to cope with improvements in artillery performance as part of the Séré de Rivières system. In 1946, the fort was vacated by the garrison. It is now the home of the Communication and Audiovisual Production Company for the Department of Defense (Établissement de communication et de production audiovisuelle de la Défense, E.C.P.A.D.).

== Description ==
Fort d'Ivry dominates a crossroads just to the north of the fort, one of the major approaches to Paris leading to the Porte d'Ivry in the Thiers wall. The pentagonal fort has bastions at each of its five points. The original construction is in stone, with rough stone for the majority of exterior surfaces and dressed stone for accents, gates and window surrounds. A ditch, which still exists on three sides, lies outside the walls. One side of the fort's wall is pierced with 18 casemates, while the others have a parapet shielding a covered walkway. Casemates are also cut into the flanks of the bastions to provide covering fire along the length of the main walls. Three wells provide water. A central parade ground is flanked by a barracks and two officers' residences. The main gate is complemented by three postern gates.

The fort includes more than two kilometers of underground passages added between 1852 and 1860, with ceilings six meters thick. The fort was upgraded after the Franco-Prussian War as part of the Séré de Rivières program. A police barracks now occupies the former ditch on the west side, while a variety of buildings occupy the former glacis. The former casemates, barracks and magazine have been redeveloped as offices.

== History ==
During the Franco-Prussian War of 1870-71 the fort was manned by a Fusiliers Marins battalion from Brest, commanded by naval Captain Krantz. It was equipped with 94 artillery pieces. On 29 and 30 November 1870, the fort supported attacks against the 6th Prussian Corps, located north of Choisy-le-Roi, Thiais and Chevilly-la-Rue. Following an armistice, the fort was occupied by the 6th Prussian Corps from 29 January to 20 March 1871, bringing batteries of 21 cm and 15 cm mortars to fire at Paris in the event of resumed hostilities. During the Paris Commune, which ensued after the withdrawal of the Prussians, the fort was occupied by local townspeople under the leadership of Colonel Rogowski. The Communards were threatened with attack by the French government's 3rd Versailles Corps and evacuated the fort during the night of 24/25 May, blowing up munitions and destroying nine casemates. Repairs were made in 1872, adding two more barracks.

Roger Degueldre, chief of the Commando Delta organization of the Organisation armée secrète, was executed by firing squad at the Fort d'Ivry on 6 July 1962.

Jean Bastien-Thiry, found guilty of organizing an assassination attempt against French president Charles de Gaulle on 22 August 1962, was executed at the Fort d'Ivry on 11 March 1963. Bastien-Thiry's was the last execution by firing squad in France.

== ECPAD ==
The Communication and Audiovisual Production Company for the Department of Defense (Établissement de communication et de production audiovisuelle de la Défense, E.C.P.A.D.) stores the audio-visual archives of the French defense forces from 1900 to present and produces new materials. Approximately 3.5 million photographs and 16,800 films are preserved. The archives include collections relating to World War I, World War II and the liberation of France, the Indochina war, Algeria, NATO, UN operations and German-produced material from World War II.

== See also ==
- Fortifications of Paris in the 19th and 20th centuries
