= Mirzaq Biqtash =

Algeria writer and novelist (1945–2021)

- مرزاق بقطاش
- Born: 13 June 1945; Algiers, Algeria
- Died: 2 January 2021 (aged 75)
- Education: University of Algiers
- Occupations: writer, novelist, journalist
- Years active: 1976–2021

Mirzaq Biqtash (13 June 1945 – 2 January 2021) (Arabic:مرزاق بقطاش), Algerian writer and novelist. He published more than fifteen novels, translations, and short stories. His last work was the novel "The Rain Writers His Biography", which won the Assia Djebar Prize for Fiction in its third session, 2017. He died on 2 January 2021, at the age of 75.

== Education and career ==
Mirzaq Biqtash was born on 13 June 1945 in the Ain Al-Badra neighborhood in the Algiers. He began learning Arabic from a young age in the publish schools which were supervised by the Association of Algerian Muslims, and learned French in regular French public schools. He studied at the University of Algiers and obtained a bachelor's degree in translation from Arabic-French-English. He began his career as a journalist in 1962. He worked in many Arabic and French newspapers including Algerian News Agency, Al-Watan newspaper, Al-Mujahid, Al-Sha’ab and others.

Biqtash started reading since he was young. He began reading the Quran first, and then old books and stories such as "One Thousand and One Nights". He published his first work in 1962, when he translated chapters from the book "Earth and Blood" by the Algerian writer Mouloud Feraoun. In 1976, he published his first novel.

Biqtash published more than fifteen novels, including his latest novel "The Rain Writes His Biography" which won the Assia Djebar Prize for Novel at its third session in 2017. He was a member of the Supreme Council for Media, the Supreme Council for Education, and the National Consultative Council.

In 1993, Biqtash was subjected to an assassination attempt by a terrorist group during the Civil war in Algeria. He was hit by a bullet in the head.

== Death ==
Biqtash died on 2 January 2021, at the age of 75.

== Awards ==
- 2017: his novel "The Rain Writes His Biography" won the Assia Djebar Prize.
