= Argoud =

Argoud is a French surname. Notable people with the surname include:

- Antoine Argoud (1914–2004), French Army officer
- Karin Argoud (fl. 1981), American actress
