= Operation Corsica =

1958 military operation

- Part of the May 1958 crisis during the Algerian War
Date	24 May 1958
Location	Corsica, France 42°N 9°E
Result	Dissident victory; island captured with no resistance

Belligerents
French Fourth Republic	Dissident units of the French Armed Forces

Commanders and leaders
René Coty; Pierre Pflimlin	Army General Raoul Salan; Army General Jacques Massu; Army Air General Edmond Jouhaud; Admiral Philippe Auboyneau; Jacques Soustelle; Pierre Lagaillarde

Units involved
National Gendarmerie	Dissident paratroopers

Casualties and losses
None	None

Operation Corsica (French: Opération Corse) was a military operation that precipitated the fall of the French Fourth Republic in 1958. On 24 May, French paratroopers, who were actively engaged in Algeria, landed on Corsica by aircraft, taking the French island in a bloodless action. They met no resistance by the Gendarmerie guarding Ajaccio's airport. Subsequently, preparations were made in Algeria for Operation Resurrection, which had as objectives the seizure of Paris and the removal of the French government, through the use of paratroopers and armoured forces based at Rambouillet.

The French government immediately resigned, and President Rene Coty appointed Charles de Gaulle as Prime Minister, with a mandate to dismantle the Republic and erect a new one.

== Background ==
The War in Algeria was going poorly, with the government of France viewed increasingly unfavorably by the French Army in Algiers. A group of rebel officers decided to take action by installing retired General Charles de Gaulle as the President of France. The prelude to this goal was to be Operation Corsica.

=== Algiers ===
It started as a coup attempt led at Algiers on 13 May 1958 by a military coalition headed by Algiers deputy and reserve airborne officer Pierre Lagaillarde, Generals Raoul Salan, Edmond Jouhaud, Jean Gracieux, and Jacques Massu, and by Admiral Philippe Auboyneau, commander of the Mediterranean fleet. The putsch was supported by former Algerian Governor General Jacques Soustelle and his activist allies.

After his tour as governor general, Jacques Soustelle had returned to France to organize support for de Gaulle's return to power, while retaining close ties to the army and the settlers. By early 1958, he had organized a coup d'état, bringing together dissident army officers and colonial officials with sympathetic Gaullists. An army junta under General Jacques Massu seized power in Algiers on the night of 13 May. General Salan assumed leadership of a Committee of Public Safety formed to replace the civil authority and pressed the junta's demands that de Gaulle be named by French president René Coty to head a government of national union invested with extraordinary powers to prevent the "abandonment of Algeria". Salan announced on radio that the Army had “provisionally taken over responsibility for the destiny of French Algeria”. Under the pressure of Massu, Salan declared Vive de Gaulle ! 'long live de Gaulle!' from the balcony of the Algiers Government-General building on 15 May. De Gaulle answered two days later that he was ready to “assume the powers of the Republic”. (Note: French: "prêt à assumer les pouvoirs de la République") Many worried as they saw this answer as support for the army.
