= Albert Dovecar =

French murderer

- Albert Dovečar
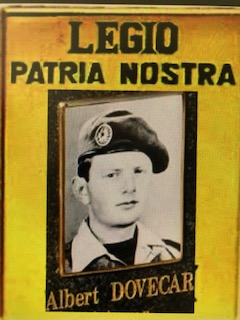
- Born: 19 July 1937; Tužno, Kingdom of Yugoslavia
- Died: 7 June 1962 (aged 24); Fort du Trou-d'Enfer, Marly-le-Roi, France
- Organization: Organisation armée secrète
- Status: Executed by firing squad
- Convictions: Murder; Desertion; Conspiracy
- Penalty: Death

Albert Dovecar (19 July 1937 – 7 June 1962) was a sergeant in the French 1st Foreign Parachute Regiment of the French Foreign Legion. He was executed by firing squad at the Fort du Trou d'Enfer for his part in the assassination of French National Police Divisional Commissaire Roger Gavoury during the Algerian War.

== Biography ==
Dovecar (Croatian spelling: Dovečar) was born at Tužno in Croatia. He enlisted in the Foreign Legion on 5 April 1957 at Marseille under the name of "Paul Dodevart," claiming birth in Vienna, Austria on 20 February 1938. After training at the Foreign Legion training base at Mascara, he was assigned to the 1st Parachute Regiment (Foreign Legion). Dovecar took back his original name on his promotion to sergeant on 16 June 1960. Dovecar participated in the Algerian War, receiving three citations and one combat wound. After his participation in the Algiers putsch of 1961, he decided to break his contract on 27 April 1961 to join the Organisation armée secrète (OAS).

Within the OAS, Dovecar was the leader of Commando Delta Team 1, under the orders of Lieutenant Roger Degueldre. Dovecar and Claude Piegts assassinated Commissaire Roger Gavoury on 31 May 1961. Dovecar was apprehended at Degueldre's headquarters on the Boulevard Marcel Duclos in Algiers, with five of his companions on 11 October 1961.

Tried for "participation in a conspiracy formed with the intention of causing the citizens to arm one against the other, of murder by ambush, and desertion in times of peace," Dovecar was condemned to death by a French tribunal. He was shot on 7 June 1962 at the Fort du Trou d'Enfer, along with Claude Piegts.

3,680 people were convicted for their participation in the OAS or related activities, and 41 were convicted of capital crimes. Of the 41 condemnations, only four were executed: Jean-Marie Bastien-Thiry, Degueldre, Piegts, and Dovecar.
