= Mouloud Feraoun =

Algerian writer and martyr of the Algerian revolution

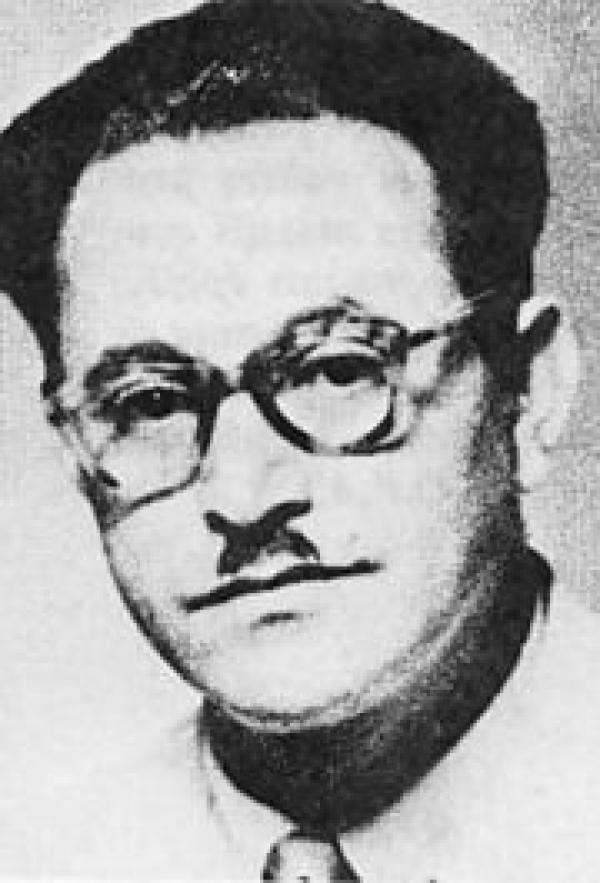
- Born: 8 March 1913 Tizi Hibel, Kabylie, Ait Mahmoud, Algeria
- Died: 15 March 1962 (aged 49) Algiers, Algeria
- Language: French

Mouloud Feraoun (Kabyle: Mulud At Ceɛban; 8 March 1913 – 15 March 1962) was an Algerian writer and martyr of the Algerian revolution born in Tizi Hibel, Kabylie. Some of his books, written in French, have been translated into several languages including English and German. In 1951, he corresponded with the Algeria-born French author Albert Camus. He was kidnapped and assassinated by the French OAS on 15 March 1962, just days before the end of the war.

All of his works describe Feraoun's native society – the Berber mountain farmers – and their life, poverty, the love of one's homeland, emigration, and the consequences of French colonialism.

On 3 March 2022, in a ceremony in Algiers, French president Emmanuel Macron honored Feraoun and other victims of the OAS.

== Biography ==
Feraoun was born in 1913, belonging to a family of poor farmers. His father, who was illiterate, had to migrate several times to seek employment, for example to Tunisia and even to northern France, where he worked in the coal mines of the Nord departement. There, Feraoun's father suffered an injury, which found a literary treatment in his first novel Fils du Pauvre.

In a time where very few of the Muslim children of Algeria went to school, Feraoun studied at the Ecole normale in Bouzaréah District in order to qualify as a teacher, and in 1935, he began to teach in his own birthplace. Later, from 1957, Feraoun was a school director in Algiers, and in 1960, he was made an inspector who supervised social institutions that cared for disadvantaged Algerians. On 15 March, 1962, together with five of his colleagues, he was assassinated by an OAS unit under the command of Roger Degueldre, just four days before the end of the Algerian War.

Degueldre was later arrested, court-martialed, and sentenced to death for his complicity in over 20 murders, including that of a British diplomat and Divisional Commissaire of the French National Police and Central Commissaire of Algiers Roger Gavoury. He was executed by firing squad at Fort d'Ivry in Paris on 7 July 1962. Three French Army officers were imprisoned and demoted after refusing to command the firing squad to execute Degueldre.

== Bibliography ==
- Le Fils du pauvre (The Poor Man's Son) - 1950
- La terre et le sang (Earth and Blood) - 1953
- Jours de Kabylie (Days of Kabylie) - 1954
- Les Chemins qui montent (The Paths that Rise) - 1957
- Les Isefra de Si Mhand Oumhand (Verses of Si Mhand Oumhand), 1960
- Journal, 1955 - 1962
- Lettres à ses amis (Letter to his friends), 1969 (posthumous)
- L'Anniversaire (The Anniversary), 1972 (posthumous)
- La Cité des Roses (The City of Roses), 2008 (posthumous
