= Georges Watin =

French–Algerian counter-revolutionary militant

- Watin in a mugshot from 1960
- Born: 10 May 1923; Aïn Defla, French Algeria
- Died: 19 February 1994 (aged 70); Paraguay
- Other name: la Boîteuse
- Occupations: Agricultural manager, militant activist
- Known for: Role in Organisation armée secrète (OAS) including the Petit-Clamart attack

Georges Watin (10 May 1923 – 19 February 1994), nicknamed la Boîteuse ("the Limper" (Note: Watin's nickname of la Boîteuse is the feminine form of the term; the masculine form is le Boiteux, which is associated with Charles II of Naples.)), was an Algerian-born French agricultural manager and militant activist of the counter-revolutionary Organisation armée secrète. He was involved in torture, murder, bombings and assassination attempts, including against French president Charles de Gaulle. His plans and actions were a major inspiration for events depicted in Frederick Forsyth's début novel, The Day of the Jackal, in which he called Watin "The most dangerous man in the room".

== Biography ==
Watin was born in Aïn Defla ("Duperré" to French colonists), where his father was an army colonel. He gained the nickname la Boîteuse because of a pronounced limp from a childhood accident. A landowner, he studied agronomy and managed an agricultural property in Arib ("Littré" to colonialists), on the Mitidja plain. He violently opposed the movement towards independence for Algeria and expressed such views as a member of the L'Union française nord-africaine (UFNA), founded by local vineyard owner Robert Martel in 1955.

At the end of 1956, Watin took part in the kidnapping, torture and murder of an Algerian tobacconist, Mohamed Chaouche, suspected of collecting funds for the Algerian independence group, the Front de Libération Nationale (FLN). In January 1957, he organized an assassination attempt with a bazooka against general Raoul Salan, commander-in-chief in Algeria, because of his perceived weakness in the fight against the FLN. He was imprisoned. UFNA merged with the Mouvement populaire du 13-Mai and Martel replaced general Lionel-Max Chassin as its leader, steering it towards resentment against the French Fourth Republic and Gaulliste politics. In 1959, after his release, Watin bought a brewery in Algiers, where Colonial militants would meet secretly. Following his involvement in the insurrection known as La semaine des barricades in January 1960, he was expelled from Algeria because of suspected bomb attacks. He had gained a fearsome reputation, mutilating his victims – following a grim tribal tradition from North Africa – by collecting their ears in jars.

On 8 January 1961, a referendum on self-determination in Algeria had been supported by 75% of voters in France and 70% in Algeria. Watin had been detained on his arrival in Paris at the Hôpital Beaujon. He was released and stayed with an uncle in Rueil-Malmaison before going underground to continue shooting and bomb attacks, this time in metropolitan France from April to November 1961 as part of the Organisation armée secrète (OAS), a far-right terror organisation formed from militant networks of the Algerian War after the 1961 referendum. Ironically, its chief was his previous assassination target, general Salan. On 3 July 1962, after a referendum in Algeria, de Gaulle declared Algeria's independence after over 99% voted for it with a turnout of over 90%.

=== Assassination attempts on Charles de Gaulle ===
Watin led "Mission III", an especially violent branch of the OAS; he was regarded as the deadliest of all OAS militants in France.

On 22 August 1962, he was one of nine – including three foreigners – waiting at the Petit-Clamart crossroads who tried to assassinate Charles de Gaulle. Planned by colonel and missile engineer Jean-Marie Bastien-Thiry (acting as a lookout) on a route taking de Gaulle to Villacoublay airport, the plot's members fired over 180 shots with automatic weapons. Fourteen hit de Gaulle's Citroen DS. A bullet from Watin's machine pistol entered the rear windscreen and missed de Gaulle's head by two centimetres; believing Watin had hit de Gaulle, Bastien-Thiry's lieutenant, Alain de la Tocnaye shouted, "You got him!" In fact, neither de Gaulle nor the other passengers – his wife Yvonne and son-in-law Alain de Boissieu – were harmed.

In February 1963, Watin was the organiser of a plot aiming to kill de Gaulle with a sniper – captain Robert Poinard – who was to use a rifle with telescopic sight to shoot the president inspecting the honour guard in the cobbled École Militaire courtyard during a visit. Police were tipped off. This event – following the Petit-Clamart shooting and Watin's continued evasion of the authorities – with first-hand knowledge gained as a Reuters journalist in Paris that most OAS supporters were under surveillance – inspired writer Frederick Forsyth to create a foreign sniper codenamed Chacal for his 1971 novel The Day of the Jackal.

Watin escaped to Switzerland. He was tried in absentia in Paris for the Petit-Clamart attack on de Gaulle and was sentenced to death along with Bastien-Thierry, de la Tocnaye and three other conspirators in March 1963. The French authorities applied for his extradition but the Federal Supreme Court of Switzerland denied the request on 7 October 1964, deeming that Watin's acts were "political" in nature if "the person aimed at practically embodies the political system of the State so that it might be thought that his disappearance will entail a change in that system". Notwithstanding this court decision, the Swiss Federal Council had, before the extradition had been requested, decided to expel Watin under article 70 of the Swiss Federal Constitution. He was told to leave Switzerland, travelling first to Spain then to Asunción, Paraguay, where he settled in 1965. Following the amnesty laws enacted, which cleared militants in France and Algeria, particularly from 1968, he chose to remain in exile. He was involved in a fraud case in 1986.

=== Final years ===
In 1990, Watin stated that the initial plan was to "kidnap him [de Gaulle], bring him to justice before a military court-martial, and only then execute him," for supporting Algeria's independence. In 1994, a month before his death, he said he had no regrets about the assassination attempt on the French president, adding, "I am still a nationalist. And he (de Gaulle) was an s.o.b." In his final years, Watin lived in a house with an allowance from the French consulate. Arthritic, he had been confined to bed since surgery in 1993. He died of heart failure on 19 February 1994 near Asunción.
