= Guido Giannettini =

Italian journalist and political activist (1930–2002)

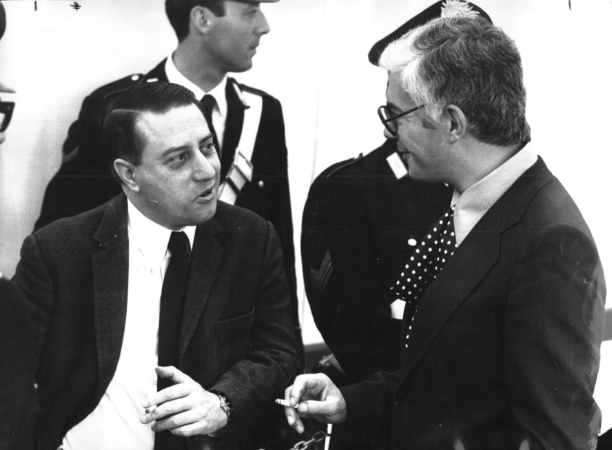
- Guido Giannettini (on the left), together with Franco Freda, during the Catanzaro trial.
- Born: 22 August 1930; Taranto, Italy
- Died: 12 May 2003 (aged 72)
- Height: 1.67 m (5 ft 6 in)

Guido Giannettini (22 August 1930 – 12 May 2003) was an Italian journalist and far-right activist who also acted as an informer for the Italian intelligence services.

== Activism ==
Guido Giannettini was born on 22 August 1930, in Taranto. In 1954 he joined the student association Young Italy in Naples. He was active in the OAS support networks, and arrested in 1961 in Madrid along with Pierre Lagaillarde. While in Spain, Giannettini was also in contact with members of the Falange.

During the 1960's Giannettini was tied to far-right politicians and activists across Europe. In Greece, he was in contact with Konstantinos Plevris, the leader of the Metaxist 4th of August Party. Furthermore, in Portugal Giannettini had provided “confidential information” to the Portuguese Legion, a paramilitary group backed by the Salazar regime.

Giannettini wrote for the newspapers Il Roma and Il Secolo d'Italia, as well as L'Italiano, headed by Pino Romualdi (MSI). In 1963-64, he started to write in the Rivista Militare, a journal of the Italian military general staff, and participated in various NATO meetings. During one of these meetings he met NATO General Secretary Manlio Brosio.

Giannettini participated in a colloquium on "revolutionary warfare" on 3–5 May 1965 in Rome (Parco dei Principi hotel), which was organized by the Institute Alberto-Pollio, "quasi-exclusively financed by the SIFAR" military intelligence agency. Giannettini presented there one of the main reports. According to René Monzat, "this colloquium provided the theoretical framework for the strategy of tension."

Following this colloquium, in which about 20 students participated (among them, Stefano Delle Chiaie and Mario Michele Merlino), Giannettini and other intervenants were hired by the Italian secret services. In April 1968, these students went on a trip to Greece of 60 students from the "League of Greek Fascist Students in Italy" and of 51 Italian neo-fascist students, organized by the Greek junta. According to Frédéric Laurent, author of L'Orchestre noir (p. 75), "more than half of the Italians (...) returned from Athens suddenly converted to Anarchism, Leftism, or to Communism, preferably Chinese".

In 1966, Giannettini published with Pino Rauti "Red Hands on the Armed Forces" (Le mani rosse sulle forze armate). In 1969, he and Rauti participated in an Italian military delegation to West Germany, to prepare the purchase of Leopard tanks. During this trip, the two men would meet the newly elected Chancellor Willy Brandt and his Defense Minister Helmut Schmidt at the Italian embassy. According to the Swiss brochure made by friends of Giannettini, he was an important agent of the SIFAR and then of the SID ("Agent Z"), although other sources claim he was only a paid informer.

During the Parliamentary Commission on Terrorism headed by Senator Giovanni Pellegrino, the Italian Minister of Defense officially recognized before parliament that Giannettini had been on the Italian secret services' pay-roll. Giorgio Freda, who was acquitted in the trial concerning the 1969 bombings, gave public marks of trust to Giannettini.

According to the magistrate Guido Salvini, in charge of the investigations concerning the 1969 Piazza Fontana bombing, "Guido Giannettini had contacts with Yves Guérin-Sérac in Portugal ever since 1964." According to Giannettini, he was introduced to Sérac by OAS operative Jean Rene Souètre as "Ralf."
