= Jean Bastien-Thiry =

French Air Force lieutenant-colonel and attempted assassin of Charles de Gaulle

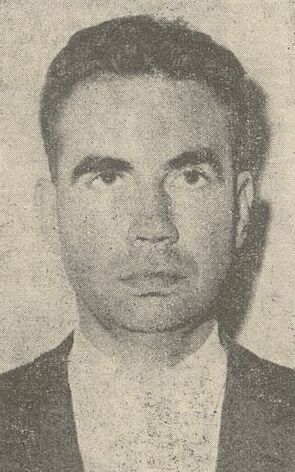
- Mug shot of Bastien-Thiry
- Born: 19 October 1927; Lunéville, France
- Died: 11 March 1963 (aged 35) Fort d'Ivry, Ivry-sur-Seine, France
- Cause of death: Execution by firing squad
- Allegiance: France
- Branch: French Air Force
- Rank: Lieutenant colonel
- Known for: Role in the Petit-Clamart attack
- Conflicts: World War II; Algerian War
- Other work: Aerospace engineer

Jean-Marie Bastien-Thiry (19 October 1927 – 11 March 1963) was a French Air Force lieutenant colonel, military air-weaponry engineer and the creator of the Nord SS.10/SS.11 missiles. Bastien-Thiry and multiple colleagues attempted to assassinate French president Charles de Gaulle in the Petit-Clamart attack of 22 August 1962 in retaliation for de Gaulle's decision to accept Algerian independence. Bastien-Thiry remains the most recent person to be executed by firing squad in France.

Although the assassination attempt nearly claimed de Gaulle's life, he and his entire entourage escaped injury. The event is depicted in Frederick Forsyth's 1971 novel The Day of the Jackal and in the 1973 film adaptation of the same name, in which Bastien-Thiry is portrayed by actor Jean Sorel.

== Life ==
Bastien-Thiry was born to a family of Catholic military officers in Lunéville, Meurthe-et-Moselle. His father had known de Gaulle in the 1930s and was a member of the Gaullist RPF. He attended the École polytechnique, followed by the École nationale supérieure de l'aéronautique, then entered the French Air Force, where he specialized in the design of air-to-air missiles. In 1957, he was promoted to principal military air engineer. He was married to Geneviève Lamirand whose father, Georges Lamirand (1899–1994), had been General Secretary of Youth from September 1940 to March 1943 in the government of Vichy France, although the rest of the family was Free French. Together they had three daughters.

== Assassination attempt ==
Since 1848, the French state had considered French Algeria an integral part of the French nation, as opposed to other French colonies. However, French rule did not grant voting rights to Algeria's Muslim population. French Algeria also had a large population of Algerian-born Europeans, known as pied-noirs, who largely controlled its politics and its economy. After returning to power with the stated intention of maintaining the French departments of Algeria, in September 1959 de Gaulle reversed his policy and supported Algerian independence. Until this time, Bastien-Thiry had been a Gaullist, but he now became an opponent. As a result of the new policy, two referendums on self-determination were held, the first in 1961 and the second in 1962 (the French Évian Accords referendum).

Bastien-Thiry, who was involved with the mysterious organisation Vieil État-Major, tried to make contact with the Organisation armée secrète (OAS), a paramilitary group opposed to de Gaulle's policy and to the National Liberation Front (FLN). According to Dr. Pérez, OAS chief of intelligence and operations section (ORO), a messenger from Vieil État Major named Jean Bichon had met Bastien-Thiry in Algiers, but no further collaboration ensued. Bastien-Thiry never had contact with the OAS organisation and he never stated that his direct chief was Jean Bichon, who was arrested later.

Bastien-Thiry led the most prominent of several assassination attempts on de Gaulle. He and his group of three shooters (Lt. Alain de La Tocnaye, Jacques Prevost and Georges Watin) made preparations in the Paris suburb of Petit-Clamart. On 22 August 1962, while Bastien-Thiry functioned as a lookout, de Gaulle's car (a Citroën DS) and some nearby shops were raked with machine-gun fire. De Gaulle and his wife and entourage escaped, uninjured. After the attempt, holes from 14 bullets were found in the president's vehicle, one of which barely missed his head. Another 20 were found to have struck the nearby Café Trianon and an additional 187 spent shell casings were found on the pavement. De Gaulle was said to have credited the unusual resilience of the unarmored Citroën DS with saving his life: although the shots had punctured two of the tyres, the car escaped at full speed.

== Arrest and trial ==
Based on intelligence gained by the authorities from the interrogation of Antoine Argoud, Bastien-Thiry was arrested when he returned from a mission in the United Kingdom. He was brought to trial before a military tribunal presided by general Roger Gardet that ran from 28 January to 4 March 1963. Bastien-Thiry was defended by a legal team consisting of attorneys Jacques Isorni, Richard Dupuy, Bernard Le Coroller and Jean-Louis Tixier-Vignancour, who was later a candidate for the presidency in 1965. While claiming that the death of de Gaulle would have been justified by the "genocide" of the European population of newly independent Algeria (a reference mainly to the Oran massacre of 1962) and the killing of several tens or hundreds of thousands of mostly pro-French Muslims (harkis) by the FLN, Bastien-Thiry claimed that while the other conspirators might have been trying to kill the head of state, he had only been attempting to capture de Gaulle in order to deliver him to a panel of sympathetic judges. Bastien-Thiry, who had been deemed fit to stand trial by psychiatrists despite a history of clinical depression, was convicted and sentenced to death, as were two of his accomplices, de la Tocnaye and Prevost. The only conspirator to escape was OAS member Georges Watin (also known as la Boîteuse or "the Limper" because of a childhood accident), who died in February 1994 at age 71. Another suspect, OAS commander and retired French Army major Henri Niaux, hanged himself in prison on 15 September 1962.

=== Possibility of clemency ===
As president, de Gaulle had the power of clemency. He commuted the death sentences of those who fired the shots but refused to spare Bastien-Thiry, despite an appeal from Bastien-Thiry's father. Before the trial, de Gaulle expressed his intention to grant clemency to Bastien-Thiry, saying the "idiot" would "get off with twenty years and in five years I'll free him." However, according to his son-in-law Alain de Boissieu, after the conspirators' conviction, de Gaulle stated his reasons for refusing to alter the sentence:

1. Bastien-Thiry had directed his subordinates to fire on a car in which there was an innocent woman present (Madame Yvonne de Gaulle).
2. He had endangered civilians, namely the Fillon family, who had been travelling in a car near the one carrying de Gaulle.
3. He had brought foreigners, specifically three Hungarians, into the plot.
4. During his trial, he claimed that he had not intended to kill de Gaulle, but rather to kidnap him. Asked how he intended to confine the president, Bastien-Thiry replied, "We would just have taken away his spectacles and braces." His defense lawyer was heard to mutter, "he has just signed his own death warrant," as it was much anticipated that while de Gaulle might have pardoned an assassin, he would not pardon an assassin who had publicly mocked him.
5. Finally, and most serious in de Gaulle's eyes, while the other conspirators performed the actual firing and had thus placed themselves in some danger, Bastien-Thiry had only directed events from afar, acting as a lookout for the gunmen.

=== Execution ===
Fearing a plot to free Bastien-Thiry, the authorities devised perhaps the most wide-ranging security operation in French judicial history in order to transport him from his cell to the place of execution. Approximately 2,000 policemen were posted along the route and 35 vehicles were employed. There was indeed such a plot, headed by Jean Cantelaube, one of de Gaulle's former security officers, but it had been abandoned. Cantelaube was later identified as the intelligence agent who provided information to Bastien-Thiry's organization.

The execution took place only one week after the trial, which was unusually swift. Moreover, an appeal was about to be heard by the Conseil d'État that might have overturned the sentence. Bastien-Thiry, having refused a blindfold and clutching a rosary, was executed by firing squad at Fort d'Ivry on 11 March 1963 at the age of 35. That evening, de Gaulle offered a dinner party for the presidents of the special courts, including the one who had sent Bastien-Thiry to his death.

About Bastien-Thiry, de Gaulle said, "The French need martyrs ... They must choose them carefully. I could have given them one of those idiotic generals playing ball in Tulle prison. I gave them Bastien-Thiry. They'll be able to make a martyr of him. He deserves it."

== See also ==
- Capital punishment in France

== Sources ==
- Lacouture, Jean (1990). De Gaulle: The Ruler 1945-1970.
- Venner, Dominique (2004). De Gaulle: La Grandeur et le Néant. Editions du Rocher. ISBN 2-268-05202-8.
- Soustelle, Jacques (1962). L'Espérance Trahie. Editions de l'Alma.
- Plume, Christian; Pierre Demaret (1973). Target De Gaulle: The Thirty-One Attempts to Assassinate the General. Richard Barry (trans.). Corgi. ISBN 0-552-10143-5.
