= Roger Gavoury =

French police officer (1911–1961)

- Born: April 7, 1911; Mello, Oise, France
- Died: May 31, 1961 (aged 50); Algiers, French Algeria
- Occupation: Police commissaire
- Known for: Assassination by OAS during the Algerian War
- Awards: Chevalier of the Legion of Honour; Croix de la Valeur Militaire (with silver star); Honour Medal of the National Police (posthumous); Citation of the Order of the Nation; Controller General of the Sûreté Nationale; Mort pour la France

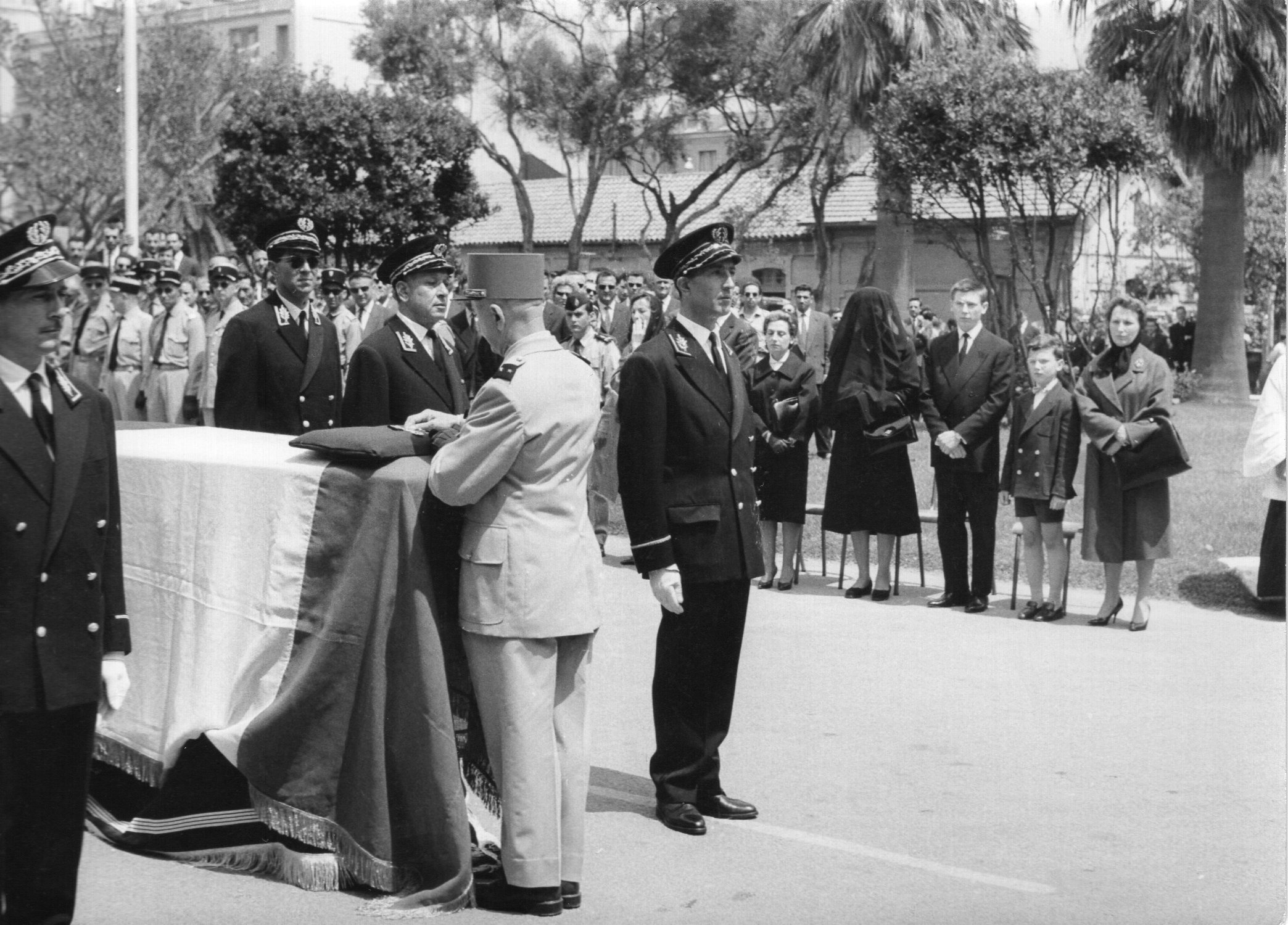
Funeral of Roger Gavoury, 3 June 1961, Algeria

Roger Gavoury (7 April 1911, Mello – 31 May 1961) was Divisional Commissaire of the French National Police and Central Commissaire of Algiers, in addition to duties associated with French Morocco.

Gavoury started his police career at Hazebrouck in 1936, occupying a variety of posts. He participated in the organization of the national police force of French Morocco between 1956 and 1959. Gavoury was assigned to Algiers beginning in 1960, retaining responsibilities in Morocco. His apartment in Algiers was bombed on 14 April 1961 during the Algerian War. Gavoury was at his family home in Charleville-Mézières at the time of the Algiers putsch of 1961. Gavoury immediately returned to Algiers, where he was killed a month later. Three more commissaires were killed that year in Algiers.

Gavoury was assassinated by two members of the OAS, Claude Piegts and Albert Dovecar, at the direction of Roger Degueldre. Gavoury was stabbed to death, aged 50, in his studio on the Rue du Docteur Trolard in Algiers on 31 May 1961, eight days after beginning an investigation into the OAS. Piegts and Dovecar were condemned to death on 30 March 1962 by a military tribunal in Paris, and executed by firing squad on 7 June 1962. Degueldre was also condemned to death and was executed by firing squad on 6 July 1962.

== Citations ==
- Chevalier of the Legion of Honour
- Croix de la Valeur Militaire with silver star
- Posthumously promoted to Controller General of the Sûreté Nationale
- Posthumously awarded the Honour medal of the National Police by (Interior) ministerial decree of 29 June 1961.
- Citation of the Order of the Nation
- His death rendered him eligible for the epitaph Mort pour la France
