= Jean-Jacques Susini =

French politician (1933–2017)

- Born: 30 July 1933; Algiers, French Algeria
- Died: 3 July 2017 (aged 83); Paris, France
- Occupations: Militant and political figure
- Known for: Co-founder of Organisation armée secrète
- Spouse: Micheline Susini (2nd wife)

Jean-Jacques Susini (30 July 1933 – 3 July 2017) was a French far-right political figure, militant and co-founder of the Organisation armée secrète (OAS), a clandestine terrorist organization opposing Algerian independence from France.

== Life ==
Born in Algiers, French Algeria to Corsican parents. Susini became head of the student association there in 1959. In January 1960, he, Pierre Lagaillarde and Joseph Ortiz were responsible for the journée des barricades ("day of the barricades") in Algiers.

In 1960, he was detained at La Santé Prison in Paris. While imprisoned, he was visited by Jean-Marie Le Pen. He took advantage of his parole to escape to Spain, with Pierre Lagaillarde, Jean-Maurice Demarquet, Marcel Ronda and Fernand Féral Lefevre, where he joined Raoul Salan and founded the OAS with him and Pierre Lagaillarde on 3 December 1960. He was responsible for psychological action and propaganda (APP). After the arrest of Raoul Salan in April 1962, Sushini became the head of the OAS for Algiers and Constantine. In June 1962, he brokered an (ultimately failed) agreement with the FLN. Beginning in 1962, Susini hid for five years in Italy under a false identity. During this time he was wanted in France for various attempts to assassinate Charles de Gaulle (in particular the one of 15 August 1964, near the "Mont Faron" in Toulon) and for his role in the OAS. He was twice condemned to death in absentia.

Susini benefited from an amnesty in 1968 by Charles de Gaulle, returning to France. In 1970, he was imprisoned for 16 months on suspicion of robbery. In 1972 he was imprisoned again for two years. He was believed to have been responsible for the 1968 disappearance of colonel Raymond Gorel, alias "Cimeterre", the former cashier of the OAS. Again, he benefited from an amnesty by the government by François Mitterrand.

Susini was a member of the far-right National Front and wrote a multivolume history of the OAS, the first volume of which covered the period from May to July 1961, has been published. He later ran unsuccessfully for office in Marseille on the National Front ticket in the 1997 elections.

== Sources ==
- Clément Steuer: Sushini et l'OAS. l'Harmattan, Paris 2004, ISBN 2-7475-6762-1
- Henri Pouillot: La villa Sushini. Tortures en Algerie. Edition Tirésias, Paris 2001, ISBN 2-908527-88-X
- Jean-Jacques Sushini: Histoire de l’O.A.S. Edition de la Table Ronde, Paris 1963.
- Rearguard Action for Terror Time magazine, 29 June 1962
