= Oran massacre of 1962 =

Massacre of French settlers in Algeria

- Part of aftermath of the Algerian War
- Location: Oran, Algeria
- Date: July 5–7, 1962
- Target: Pied-Noirs
- Deaths: 95–365
- Injuries: ~161
- Perpetrators: National Liberation Army; Algerian civilians
- Motive: Ethnic conflict

The Oran massacre of 1962 was a massacre of Pied-Noir and European settlers by Front de libération nationale (FLN) troops and Algerian civilians in Oran, Algeria. Between 95 and 365 people were killed in the massacre from 5–7 July, 1962.

It began on the date of Algerian independence amid a riot that began after some Europeans fired at FLN troops as they entered the city, ending 2 days later with the deployment of the French Gendarmerie. Neither French forces nor the Algerian police intervened to stop the massacre. The massacre was preceded by a campaign of bombings by the Organisation armée secrète (OAS), a French militant group opposed to Algerian independence, which killed hundreds of Algerians living in Oran between May and June 1962 and destroyed critical infrastructure across the region.

== Background ==
The Algerian War had been underway since 1954. The Évian Accords of 18 March 1962 brought an end to the conflict. The Accords, which were reached during a cease-fire between French armed forces and the Algerian nationalist organisation the Front de libération nationale (FLN), began the process of transfer of power from the French to the Algerians. The Évian Accords intended to guarantee the rights and safety of the pieds-noirs, French and Spanish colonial residents, many born in Algeria, and indigenous Sephardi Jews in an independent Algeria. However, the flight of French pieds-noirs and pro-French native Algerians began in April 1962, and by late May hundreds of thousands had emigrated from Algeria, chiefly to metropolitan France. In fact, within weeks, three-quarters of the pieds-noirs had resettled in France.

With armed conflict apparently at an end, the French government loosened security on Algeria's border with Morocco, allowing the FLN freer movement within Algeria. Independence had been bitterly opposed by the pieds-noirs and many members of the French military, and the anti-independence OAS began a campaign of open rebellion against the French government, declaring its military to be an "occupying power". In May 1962, the OAS engaged in a bombing campaign that killed an estimated 10 to 50 Algerians in Oran daily. The violence was so intense that people living in European neighbourhoods fled rapidly; some Muslims left Oran to join their families in villages or in cities that did not have large European populations. The OAS carried out a scorched earth campaign to deny French-built facilities and development to the future FLN government, a policy that reached its climax on 7 June 1962, when the OAS Delta Commandos burned Algiers Library and its 60,000 volumes, and blew up Oran's town hall, the municipal library, and four schools. Additionally, between June 25–26, 1962, OAS commandos attacked and robbed six banks.

Oran was a particularly important place in French Algeria. It stood out for its unique demography. In the 1931 census, over 80% of the inhabitants were reportedly European, a proportion that increased drastically after 1939 when a new wave of Spaniards fled there amid the Spanish Civil War. Communal unrest and violence had been seen in the city from the end of the 19th century onward. In the 1930s, Oran's bullring became the central arena for the campaign for reform of Algerian institutions; and between 1936–37, was home to strikes that shook the city. One incident between strikers and non-strikers during this period escalated to the point of police firing on the bullring, and, elsewhere in the city, being attacked with stones. Discussing Oran during the interwar period, historian Claire Marynower described it as "a place where politics were transformed and radicalised, throwing into sharp local relief issues that concerned the whole French empire."

== Event ==
On the morning of 5 July 1962, the day Algeria became independent, seven katibas (companies) of FLN troops entered the city and were fired at by some Europeans. An outraged Arab mob swept into the pied-noir neighbourhoods, which had already been largely vacated, and attacked the remaining pieds-noirs. The violence lasted several hours, during which the mob cut the throats of many men, women and children. The massacre was ended by the deployment of French Gendarmerie.

Neither the Algerian police nor the 18,000 French troops in the city intervened in the massacre. Their orders from Paris were "do not move", leaving the pieds-noirs vulnerable. Many pied-noirs believed that the massacre was an expression of policy by the FLN and chose to emigrate to France.

At the 1963 trial of Jean Bastien-Thiry, who attempted to assassinate President de Gaulle, defence lawyers referred to the Oran massacre. They said that Bastien-Thiry's act was justified because de Gaulle caused a genocide of Algeria's European population.

Estimates of the total casualties vary widely. This is not unique to the Oran massacre, as there are a multitude of challenges to identifying the amount of civilian killings. There are almost always wide discrepancies in the estimated figures even in small and localised cases.

- Mostefa Naït, the post-independence director of the Oran hospital centre, claimed that 95 persons, including 20 Europeans, were killed (13 from stabbings) and 161 people were injured with local newspapers giving figures in the 30 area in the days afterwards.
- A group of historians in 2006 suggested 365 were killed.
- A local newspaper gives the figure of 1,500 casualties with no detail and no source and there has been speculation of many thousands of deaths, with the former National Front Leader Jean-Marie Le Pen claiming a figure of 700 deaths.

The number killed has been a topic of debate for right-wing individuals in France in particular.

== See also ==
- List of massacres in Algeria
