= Operation Resurrection =

1958 planned French military operation

Operation Resurrection was a planned military operation of the French Army in 1958 that sought to take over Paris, the capital of France, to force the return of Charles de Gaulle to head the government. Masterminded by General Jacques Massu, the operation was to be preceded by Opération Corse in which French Army paratroopers took over Corsica. The operation was cancelled after French politicians immediately arranged for de Gaulle's return to power.

== Background ==
General Charles de Gaulle headed the Free French Forces, which resisted Nazi Germany during World War II and became a national and military hero. Upon the liberation of France in 1944, de Gaulle became the French prime minister in a provisional government, but disagreements and political conflicts prompted him to quit and to retire from the military and politics in 1946.

A decade later, the ensuing political conflicts of the French Fourth Republic, aggravated by the outbreak of the Algerian War and economic discontent, led to popular revolts against the government, which was headed by fractious political parties. The government's policy on Algeria angered the millions of French settlers, army officers and right-wing politicians in France. French Army generals in both Paris and Algiers began exerting pressure on French politicians to return de Gaulle to a position of power.

== Planned operation ==
Revolts and riots broke out in 1958 against the French government in Algiers, which prompted General Jacques Massu to create a French settlers' committee to demand the formation of a new national government under de Gaulle, who was a national hero and had advocated a strong military policy, nationalism and the retention of French control over Algeria. Massu, who had gained prominence and authority when he ruthlessly suppressed Algerian militants, famously declared that unless de Gaulle was returned to power, the French Army would openly revolt. Massu and other senior generals had covertly planned the takeover of Paris with 1,500 paratroopers by preparing to take over airports with the support of French Air Force units. Armored units from Rambouillet prepared to roll into Paris.

On 24 May, French paratroopers from the Algerian corps landed on Corsica and took the French island in a bloodless action, Opération Corse. Operation Resurrection would be implemented if de Gaulle was not approved as leader by the French Parliament, if he asked for military assistance to take power, or if any organised attempt by the French Communist Party to seize power or to stall his return needed to be thwarted.

== Aftermath ==
On 29 May 1958, French politicians agreed upon calling on de Gaulle to take over the government as prime minister. The French Army's willingness to support an overthrow of the constitutional government was a significant development in French politics. With Army support, de Gaulle's government terminated the Fourth Republic and drew up a new constitution proclaiming the French Fifth Republic in 1958.
