= Roger Degueldre =

French foreign legion lieutenant

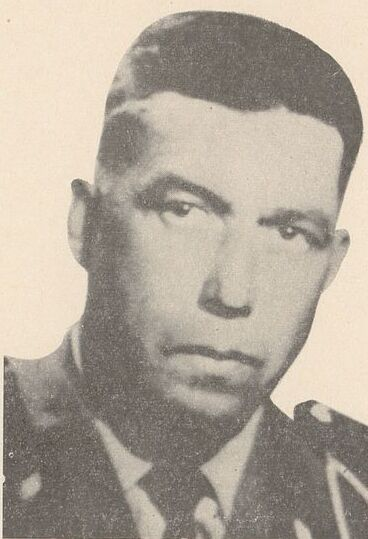
- Born: 19 May 1925; Louvroil, Hauts-de-France, France
- Died: 6 July 1962 (aged 37); Fort d'Ivry, Ivry-sur-Seine, France
- Cause of death: Execution by firing squad
- Organization: Organisation armée secrète
- Known for: Leader of the Commando Delta
- Conviction: Murder (20+ counts)
- Penalty: Death

Lieutenant Roger Hercule Gustave Degueldre (19 May 1925 – 6 July 1962) was a French officer who was the leader of the OAS Delta Commandos in the last months of French rule in Algeria. The Commandos were responsible for attempting to ethnically cleanse the Pied-Noir neighborhoods of Algerians, as well as assassinating those considered "soft" or traitors to the cause of French Algeria.

Degueldre was convicted and executed for his involvement in over 20 murders. At his court-martial, prosecutors showed that he'd been the leader of the death squads, and issued orders for the OAS to kill any isolated Muslims whom they found in the streets.

== Early life ==
There is some dispute about his origins but Jonathan Meades claimed that there was much 'disinformation' by the authorities to discredit him. For example, there were allegations that he was a Belgian collaborator with the SS during World War II.

He was born in Louvroil, Nord, France, a few kilometres from the Belgian border, into a working-class family. His father was a railway worker. When the Germans invaded in 1940, the family fled to the south of France.

== Career ==
In 1942 Degueldre clandestinely entered the occupied zone to join the French Resistance under Roger Pannequin and engaged the 10th German Motorized Infantry Division at Colmar in January 1945. He then joined French Foreign Legion, under the name of Roger "Legueldre" with a claimed birth on 18 September 1925 in Gruyeres in Switzerland. As a foreigner he would be eligible to join the Foreign Legion. His identity was formally corrected in 1955. He reached the rank of warrant officer in Indo-China and was received the Croix de Guerre des Théâtres d'Opérations Extérieures. After the battle of Điện Biên Phủ, he transferred to the 1st Foreign Parachute Regiment and was assigned to the Algerian conflict. He was made an officer and a knight of Légion d'honneur (Legion of Honour).

While defending French Algeria in 1960, he was suspected of having taken part in a failed plot against General de Gaulle shortly after his visit in Algiers. He was transferred to the 4th Foreign Regiment. He became convinced of the need for an armed struggle and deserted to operate under cover gaining a reputation for ruthlessness. He recruited Albert Dovecar as his lieutenant along with as many as 500 others. In 1961, he established a force called the Delta Commandos of the Organisation armée secrète (OAS). On 15 March 1962 the group attacked Chateau-Royale in El-Biar close to Algiers and shot six leaders of the Educational Social Centers of Algeria (three French and three Algerian) on the grounds that the centres were believed to be directing resistance to French rule. Among those killed was Mouloud Feraoun. Overall, is estimated that Degueldre's group were responsible for 20 to 30 deaths.

== Arrest and death ==
Degueldre was arrested on 7 April 1962, condemned to death for his complicity in more than 20 murders on 28 June. At his court-martial, prosecutors showed that he was the leader of the death squads, and had issued orders for the OAS to kill any isolated Muslims whom they found in the streets. Other attacks linked to Degueldre were the bombings of buildings, machine-gunning of Arab cafes, and the murder of a Muslim cab driver.

Degueldre was executed by firing squad in the Fort d'Ivry near Paris on 6 July. Three officers appointed to command the firing squad refused and were each imprisoned for 15 days and demoted. Fifteen other soldiers were disciplined for refusing to form the firing squad. Only one bullet from the 11-man firing squad hit Degueldre. The officer in charge emptied his revolver into Degueldre, who survived all of the shots. The officer had to get a second weapon to finish the execution, which took a total of 20 minutes. He is buried in the Gonards cemetery in Versailles. His partner, Nicole Gardy, was sentenced to 15 years imprisonment for her part in an escape plot but fled with her family to Argentina. Amongst them was her uncle, OAS commander Paul Gardy, who was killed in a car accident in 1975.

== Homages and memorials ==
In November 1978, Jean-Marie Le Pen, president of the Front National, in his closing speech at the fifth congress of that movement, gave a homage to both Bastien-Thiry and Roger Degueldre. Bastien-Thiry was executed by firing-squad in 1963 for organising the attempted assassination of General de Gaulle.

In Marignane there is a memorial to the members of the OAS terrorist organisation inaugurated on 6 July 2005, 43 years to the day after the execution of Roger Degueldre. In Nice, in the municipal Alsace-Lorraine park, there is a plaque on a monument dedicated to French Algeria, inaugurated on 25 February 1973, in the presence of Jacques Médecin, mayor of Nice, with the inscription "Roger Degueldre Symbole de l'Algérie Française".
