= Pósfa =

- Coat of arms

- Location of Pósfa in Hungary
- Coordinates: 47.32657°N 16.85275°E
- Country: Hungary
- Region: Western Transdanubia
- County: Vas
- Subregion: Sárvári
- Rank: Village

Area
  - Total: 5.35 km^{2} (2.07 sq mi)

Population (1 January 2008)
  - Total: 304
  - Density: 56.8/km^{2} (147/sq mi)
- Time zone: UTC+1 (CET)
  - Summer (DST): UTC+2 (CEST)
- Postal code: 9636
- Area code: +36 95
- KSH code: 15671
- Website: https://posfa.hu/

Pósfa is a village in Vas county, Hungary.
