= Organisation armée secrète =

1961–1962 French far-right paramilitary organisation

Secret Army Organisation
- Organisation armée secrète
- Emblem of the movement
- Leaders: Raoul Salan, Pierre Lagaillarde, Edmond Jouhaud, Yves Godard, Jean-Jacques Susini, Jean-Claude Perez
- Dates active: 11 February 1961 – 1962
- Active regions: France: (France) French Algeria; Spain; Portugal
- Ideology: French colonialism; French nationalism; Anti-Arabism; Anti-communism; Anti-capitalism; Neo-fascism; Fascist corporatism; Anti-Gaullism
- Political position: Far-right
- Status: defunct
- Size: 3,000 members

The Organisation armée secrète (OAS, "Secret Army Organisation") was a far-right dissident French paramilitary organisation during the Algerian War, founded in 1961 by Raoul Salan, Pierre Lagaillarde and Jean-Jacques Susini. The terrorist movement was particularly active in the final phase of the Algerian War and wanted to prevent Algeria's independence from French colonial rule by all means. The OAS carried out bombings, assassinations, and acts of torture that resulted in over 2,000 deaths. Its motto was L’Algérie est française et le restera ("Algeria is French and will remain so").

The OAS was formed from existing networks, calling themselves "counter-terrorists", "self-defence groups", or "resistance", which had carried out attacks on the Algerian National Liberation Front (FLN) and their perceived supporters since early in the war. It was officially formed in Francoist Spain, in Madrid in January 1961, as a response by some French politicians and French military officers to the 8 January 1961 referendum on self-determination concerning Algeria, which had been organised by President de Gaulle.

By acts of bombings and targeted assassinations in both metropolitan France and French Algerian territories, which are estimated to have resulted in 2,000 deaths between April 1961 and April 1962, the OAS attempted to prevent Algerian independence. This campaign culminated in a wave of attacks that followed the March 1962 Évian Accords, which granted independence to Algeria and marked the beginning of the exodus of the pieds-noirs (lit. 'black feet', ethnic Europeans born in Algeria), and in Jean Bastien-Thiry's 1962 assassination attempt against president de Gaulle in the Paris suburb of Le Petit-Clamart. The existentialist philosopher Jean-Paul Sartre, who supported the FLN was a notable target of their actions.

The OAS still has admirers in French nationalist movements. In July 2006, some OAS sympathisers attempted to relight the flame of the Tomb of the Unknown Soldier to commemorate the Oran massacre on 5 July 1962.

== History ==
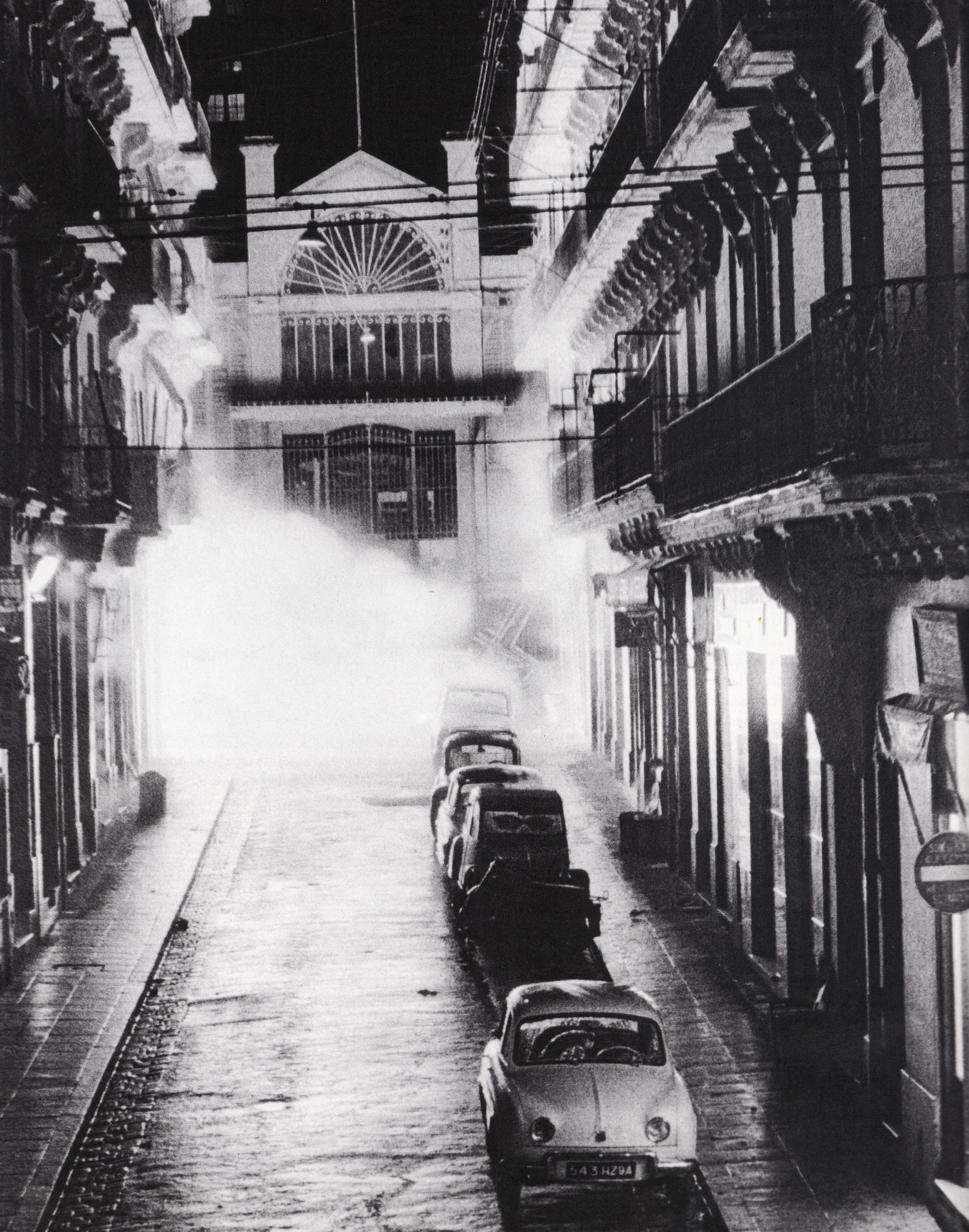
Explosion of an OAS bomb in the Bab El Oued district (January 1962)

The OAS was created in response to the January 1961 referendum on self-determination for Algeria. It was founded in Spain, in January 1961, by former officers, Pierre Lagaillarde (who led the 1960 Siege of Algiers), General Raoul Salan (who took part in the 1961 Algiers putsch or "Generals' Uprising") and Jean-Jacques Susini, along with other members of the French Army, including Yves Guérin-Sérac, and former members of the French Foreign Legion from the First Indochina War (1946–1954). OAS-Métro, the branch in metropolitan France, was led by captain Pierre Sergent. These officers united earlier anti-FLN networks such as the Organisation de Résistance de L'Algérie Française. While the movement had a broadly anticommunist and authoritarian base, in common with the political outlook of many colonists, it also included many ex-communists and a number of members who saw its struggle in terms of defending fraternal bonds between Algerians and the colonists against the FLN. In France, the OAS mainly recruited amongst overtly fascist political groups. In Algeria, its makeup was more politically diverse, and included a group of Algerian Jews, led by Jean Ghenassia. (Note: In March 1961, Ghenassia was arrested and charged with communicating with Israeli agents in Algeria, who had purportedly been smuggled into the country by submarine with the aid of the Israeli secret service and veterans of the Irgun or Lehi.) Some Algerian OAS members conceived of the conflict in terms of the French Resistance, and in contrast to later Gaullist depictions of the movement, it included a number of former Resistance members in addition to Vichy collaborators.

Resistance against Algerian independence commenced in January 1960, with further violence breaking out in 1961 during the General's Uprising. Both of these insurrections were swiftly suppressed, and many of the leaders who had created the OAS were imprisoned.

By acts of sabotage and assassination in both metropolitan France and French Algerian territories, the OAS attempted to prevent Algerian independence. The first victim was Pierre Popie, attorney and president of the People's Republican Movement (Mouvement Républicain Populaire, MRP), who stated on television, "French Algeria is dead" (L'Algérie française est morte). Roger Gavoury, head of the French police in Algiers, was assassinated at the direction of Roger Degueldre, leader of the OAS Commando Delta, with the actual killing done by Claude Piegts and Albert Dovecar on 31 May 1961. The OAS became notorious for stroungas, attacks using plastic explosives.

In October 1961 Pierre Lagaillarde, who had escaped to Francoist Spain following the 1960 barricades week, was arrested in Madrid, along with the Italian activist Guido Giannettini. Franco then exiled him to the Canary Islands.

The Delta commandos engaged in indiscriminate killing sprees, on 17 March 1962; against cleaning-ladies on 5 May; on 15 March 1962 against six inspectors of the National Education Ministry, who directed the "Educational Social Centres" (Centres sociaux éducatifs), including Mouloud Feraoun, an Algerian writer, etc. It is estimated that the assassinations carried out by the OAS between April 1961 and April 1962 left 2,000 people dead and twice as many wounded.

The OAS attempted several times to assassinate French president Charles de Gaulle. The most prominent attempt was a 22 August 1962 ambush at Petit-Clamart, a Paris suburb, planned by a military engineer who was not an OAS member, Jean Bastien-Thiry. Bastien-Thiry was executed in March 1963 after de Gaulle refused to grant him amnesty. A fictionalised version of this attack was recreated in the 1971 book by Frederick Forsyth, The Day of the Jackal, and in the 1973 film of the same name.

The OAS use of extreme violence created strong opposition from some pieds-noirs and in mainland France. As a result, the OAS eventually found itself in violent clandestine conflict with not only the FLN but also French secret services and with a Gaullist paramilitary, the Mouvement pour la Communauté (the MPC). Originally a political movement in Algiers, the MPC eventually became a paramilitary force in response to OAS violence. The group obtained valuable information which was routinely passed on to the French secret services, but was eventually destroyed by OAS assassinations.

== March 1962 Evian agreements and the struggle of the OAS ==
The main hope of the OAS was to prove that the FLN was secretly restarting military action after a ceasefire was agreed in the Evian agreements of 19 March 1962 and the referendum of June 1962, so during these three months, the OAS unleashed a new terrorist campaign to force the FLN to abandon the ceasefire. Over 100 bombs a day were detonated by the OAS in March in pursuit of this goal. OAS operatives set off an average of 120 bombs per day in March, with targets including hospitals and schools. Dozens of Arab residents were killed at Place du Gouvernement when 24 mortar rounds were fired from the European stronghold of Bab el-Oued. On 21 March, the OAS issued a flyer where they proclaimed that the French military had become an "occupation force". It organized car bombings: 25 killed in Oran on 28 February 1962 and 62 killed in Algiers on 2 May, among others. On 22 March, they took control of Bab el-Oued and attacked French soldiers, killing six of them. The French military then surrounded them and stormed the neighbourhood. The battle killed 15 French soldiers and 20 OAS members, and injured 150 more. On 26 March, the leaders of the OAS proclaimed a general strike in Algiers and called for the European settlers to come to Bab el-Oued in order to break the blockade by military forces loyal to de Gaulle and the Republic. A detachment of tirailleurs (Muslim troops in the French Army) fired on the demonstrators, killing 54, injuring 140, and traumatising the settlers' population in what is known as the "gunfight of the Rue d'Isly". In coincidence with the uprising of Bab-el Oued, 200 OAS maquis marched from Algiers to Ouarsenis, a mountainous region between Oran and Algiers. They tried to overrun two French military outposts and gain support for local Muslim tribes loyal to France, but instead they were harassed and eventually defeated by Legion units led by Colonel Albert Brothier after several days of fighting. Some clashes between the French army and the OAS involving grenades and mortar fire took place at Oran as late as 10 April. At least one lieutenant and one second-lieutenant were killed by the OAS during the fighting.

In April 1962, the OAS leader, Raoul Salan, was captured. Despite the OAS bombing campaign, the FLN remained resolute in its agreement to the ceasefire; further, on 17 June 1962, the OAS also began a ceasefire. The Algerian authority officially guaranteed the security of the remaining Europeans, but in early July 1962 the Oran Massacre occurred; hundreds of armed people came down to European areas of the city, attacking European civilians. The violence lasted several hours, including lynching and acts of torture in public places in all areas of Oran by civilians supported by the ALN—the armed wing of the FLN, at the time evolving into the Algerian Army.

By 1963, the main OAS operatives were either dead, in exile, or in prison. Claude Piegts and Albert Dovecar were executed by firing squad on 7 June 1962, and Roger Degueldre on 6 July 1962. Jean Bastien-Thiry, who had attempted the Petit-Clamart assassination on de Gaulle, but was not formally a member of the OAS, was also executed, on 11 March 1963. With the arrest of Gilles Buscia in 1965, the organisation effectively ceased to exist. The jailed OAS members were amnestied by De Gaulle under a July 1968 act. Putschist generals still alive in November 1982 were reintegrated into the Army by another amnesty law: Raoul Salan, Edmond Jouhaud, and six other generals benefited from this law.

== Legacy ==
Within France, the anti-Arab Charles Martel Group, active in the 1970s and 1980s, was formed by OAS veterans. One of the perpetrators of the 1970 Besançon courthouse attack was a former OAS member. In November 2016, an extreme right-wing terrorist cell calling itself the Organisation d'armées sociales (OAS) emerged in France. The acronym was a nod to the original Organisation Armée Secrète. Inspired by Anders Behring Breivik, the group planned attacks on kebab shops, mosques, drug dealers and politicians, but was dismantled by French authorities in before it was able to accomplish any attacks.

Many OAS members later took part in various anti-communist struggles around the world. Following the disbandment of the organisation, and the execution of several of its members, the OAS chaplain, Georges Grasset, organised the flight of OAS members, from a route going from Paris to Francoist Spain and finally to Argentina. Grasset arrived in 1962 in Buenos Aires to take charge of the Argentine branch of the Cité Catholique, an integral Catholic group formed by Jean Ousset, the personal secretary of Charles Maurras, as an offshoot of the monarchist Action Française. This anti-communist religious organisation was formed of many Algerian war veterans and individuals close to the OAS. Charles Lacheroy and Colonel Trinquier, who theorised the systemic use of torture in counter-insurgency doctrine in Modern Warfare: A French View of Counterinsurgency (1961), were members, along with Colonel Jean Gardes, who had first theorised counter-insurgency tactics during the Indochina War (1947–1954). Gardes arrived in Argentina in 1963, a year after the end of the Algerian War. There, he delivered counterinsurgency courses at the Higher School of Mechanics of the Navy (ESMA), which became infamous during the "Dirty War" in the 1970s for being used as an internment and torture center. Soon after Gardes met Federico Lucas Roussillon, an Argentine naval lieutenant commander, the cadets at the ESMA were shown the film The Battle of Algiers (1966) by Italian director Gillo Pontecorvo, during which the fictional Lieutenant-Colonel Mathieu and his paratroops make systematic use of torture, the block warden system, and death flights.

The Argentine admiral Luis María Mendía testified in January 2007 that a French intelligence agent, Bertrand de Perseval, had participated in the "disappearance" of the two French nuns, Léonie Duquet and Alice Domon. Perseval, who lives today in Thailand, denied any links with the abduction, but did admit being a former OAS member who escaped to Argentina after the Evian agreements.

The memory and mythologization of the OAS remain influential on the European far right to this day, contributing to the shaping of a radical form of Westernism, conceived as the right to the global supremacy of the Western white man over other peoples. During its activity, the OAS brought about an ideological shift within the French far right, transitioning from an extreme nationalism to a form of Westernism that identified the United States as the principal defender of the West against communism, decolonization, and Arab nationalisms. This perspective continues to influence the European far right to this day

=== Cultural references to the OAS ===
The OAS is referenced in Ian Fleming's 1963 novel On Her Majesty's Secret Service. James Bond's future father-in-law Marc-Ange, the head of a Corsican crime faction known as Union Corse, refers to the OAS in chapter 24, due to the OAS having a French military helicopter in their possession. Because of the OAS indebtedness to Marc-Ange and the Union Corse, the helicopter is loaned to the MI-6 – Marc-Ange/Union Corse coalition endeavoring to thwart Ernst Stavro Blofeld's plot to unleash biological warfare in the UK's agricultural industry.

The OAS featured prominently in Jack Higgins' 1964 novel Wrath of the Lion, in which the organization fictionally manages to suborn the crew of a French Navy submarine and use it for missions of revenge.

Alain Cavalier's 1964 film L'Insoumis stars Alain Delon as a deserter from the French Foreign Legion who joins the OAS on a kidnapping mission. Cavalier had already addressed the issue in the 1962 film Le Combat dans l'île, starring Romy Schneider and Jean-Louis Trintignant. Despite not being named, the movie is set in the context of the campaign of bombings and assassinations by the OAS.

The OAS is referenced in Jean-Luc Godard's 1965 film Pierrot Le Fou. Members of the OAS waterboard Ferdinand (whom the film centers around) to get information about his lover Marianne, who has stolen 50,000 dollars from them.

The OAS features prominently in the 1971 novel The Day of the Jackal by Frederick Forsyth, and its film adaptation. The story deals primarily with a fictional assassination plot against Charles de Gaulle, where the organisation hires a British contract killer (the Jackal) to kill de Gaulle. Bastien-Thiry and the Petit-Clamart plot figure prominently in the early sections of the story.

The OAS is referenced in the Oliver Stone film JFK, as suspected conspirator Clay Shaw (played by Tommy Lee Jones) is alleged to have business connections with them.

The OAS is referenced in Laurent Tuel's 2018 French miniseries Speakerine. In one of the subplots, a young man is drawn into the organization, delivering a bomb to a Paris restaurant.

== Organisation ==
=== Chain of command ===
The secret army was a three-part organisation, each segment having its own action commando squads.

Section (Divisions)	Role	Director	Squads
ODM; Organisation-Des-Masses; Mass Organisation	OAS recruitment	Colonel Jean Gardes; Michel Leroy	none
APP; Action-Psychologique-Propagande; Psychological Warfare & Propaganda	OAS propaganda	Jean-Jacques Susini	-Commandos Z (Z for Jean-Marcel Zagamé, founder)
ORO; Organisation-Renseignement-Opération; Organisation, Intelligence & Planning -BCR Intelligence Central Bureau -BAO Operational Action Bureau	OAS field ops planning	Jean-Claude Perez; Jean Lalanne (BCR); Roger Degueldre (BAO); Albert Dovecar (Delta 1)	-Commandos Delta (D for Roger Degueldre, founder); Delta 1 Delta 2 Delta 3

=== French Algerian branch ===
==== Oranie district ====
- General Edmond Jouhaud

Commander Pierre Guillaume
aide

- Charles Micheletti

civilian

- Colonel Dufour

replacing Gen. Jouhaud

- General Gardy

Capitaine Pierre Sergent
Revolutionary Directory member
Christian Léger
Revolutionary Directory member
Jean-Marie Curutchet
Revolutionary Directory member
Denis Baille
Revolutionary Directory member
Jean-René Souètre
Revolutionary Directory member

==== Algérois district ====
- Colonel Vaudrey
- Pierre Delhomme

in charge of El-Biar, near Algiers

==== Constantinois district ====
- Colonel Pierre Château-Jobert
- Robert Martel

aka the chouan de la Mitidja ("chouan of the Mitidja")

=== Metropolitan French branch ===
==== OAS-Métropole ====
- Captain Pierre Sergent

Chief of Staff

- Lieutenant Daniel Godot

ODM-Métropole Director

- Jacques Chadeyron

APP-Métropole

- Captain Jean-Marie Curutchet

ORO-Métropole

==== France-Mission III ====
1. André Canal

aka the Monocle

=== Spanish branch ===
==== OAS-Madrid ====
Short living dissident group claiming the organisation's direction.

- Colonel Antoine Argoud
- Colonel Charles Lacheroy
- Commander Pierre Lagaillarde

=== Commanding officers ===
- General Raoul Salan

aka Soleil (in reference to the nickname for Louis XIV)
Chief of Staff

- General Paul Gardy

Chief of Staff

- Colonel Yves Godard

Chief Aide

- Doctor Jean-Claude Perez

ORO Director

- Captain Jean-Marie Curutchet

ORO Director, replacing Dr. Perez on 1 January 1962

- Colonel Jean Gardes

ODM Director

- Jean-Jacques Susini

APP Director

== Notable members ==
- Antoine Argoud
- Bertrand de Perseval
- Maurice Challe
- Jean-Pierre Cherid
- Roger Degueldre
- Albert Dovecar
- Paul Gardy
- Yves Godard
- Yves Guérin-Sérac
- Pierre Guillaume
- Roger Holeindre
- Edmond Jouhaud
- Pierre Lagaillarde
- Jean-Pierre Maïone-Libaude
- Claude Piegts
- Raoul Salan
- Albert Spaggiari
- Jean-Jacques Susini
- Dominique Venner
- Jacques Soustelle
- Georges Watin

== See also ==
- Front Algérie Française, an earlier pied-noir nationalist group
- La Main Rouge, a similar organisation established earlier, sponsored by French intelligence agencies
