= Jean-Maurice Demarquet =

French politician

- Born: 20 August 1923; Martigues, Bouches-du-Rhône, France
- Died: 16 September 1989 (aged 66); Boulogne-Billancourt, Hauts-de-Seine, France
- Occupation: Politician
- Relatives: André Honnorat (great-uncle)

Jean-Maurice Demarquet (20 August 1923 – 26 September 1989) was a French politician. He served as a member of the National Assembly from 1956 to 1958, representing Finistère. He later fought in French Algeria and participated in the Barricades Week in 1960, after which he fled to Spain. He later joined the National Rally.
