= Antoine Argoud =

French Army officer

- Born: 26 June 1914; Darney, France
- Died: 10 June 2004 (aged 89) Vittel, France
- Allegiance: France
- Branch: French Army
- Service years: 1934–1961
- Rank: Colonel
- Commands: 3rd Regiment of the Chasseurs d'Afrique
- Conflicts: World War II; Algerian War
- Other work: OAS leader, Graphologist

Antoine Argoud (26 June 1914 – 10 June 2004) was a French Army officer specializing in counter-insurgency during the Algerian War of Independence. Argoud's opposition to Algerian independence from France resulted in his joining of the Organisation armée secrète (OAS) and support for its use of violence in opposition to this policy.

Argoud was twice tried and convicted (the first in absentia) for his role in the attempted assassination of French President Charles de Gaulle on 22 August 1962. On 25 February 1963, while he was hiding in Munich, he was kidnapped by French secret police CRS agents at the Eden-Wolff hotel. Argoud was then smuggled to France. The next day, police in Paris found him hogtied in a panel truck behind Notre-Dame de Paris. During his interrogation, Argoud's revelations allowed the secret service to arrest Jean-Marie Bastien-Thiry and other conspirators. Thiry was later executed for masterminding the plot.

Following the second trial, Argoud was sentenced to life imprisonment for treason. He was released from prison as part of a general amnesty in June 1968. He then lived in Portugal and worked as a consultant for the Portuguese Army. He returned to France in 1974. In an interview, Argoud said he hated De Gaulle for withdrawing from Algeria and was "now ashamed of being French." In his memoirs, he admitted to personally participating in atrocities. Argoud said he'd tortured detainees and extrajudicially executed Fellaghas, whose corpses he then publicly displayed.

"I carried out capital executions. I made them public, precisely to obtain maximum profitability from the death of a man, unlike many of my comrades. If you like, one man executed publicly among the Arabs has as much effectiveness as ten men executed clandestinely or behind the walls of a prison. Not content with executing them publicly, I left their corpses exposed in the public square."

== Bibliography ==
- André Cocastre-Zilgien L'affaire Argoud. Considérations sur les arrestations internationalement irrégulières, Pédone, 1965
