= Pierre Lagaillarde =

French politician

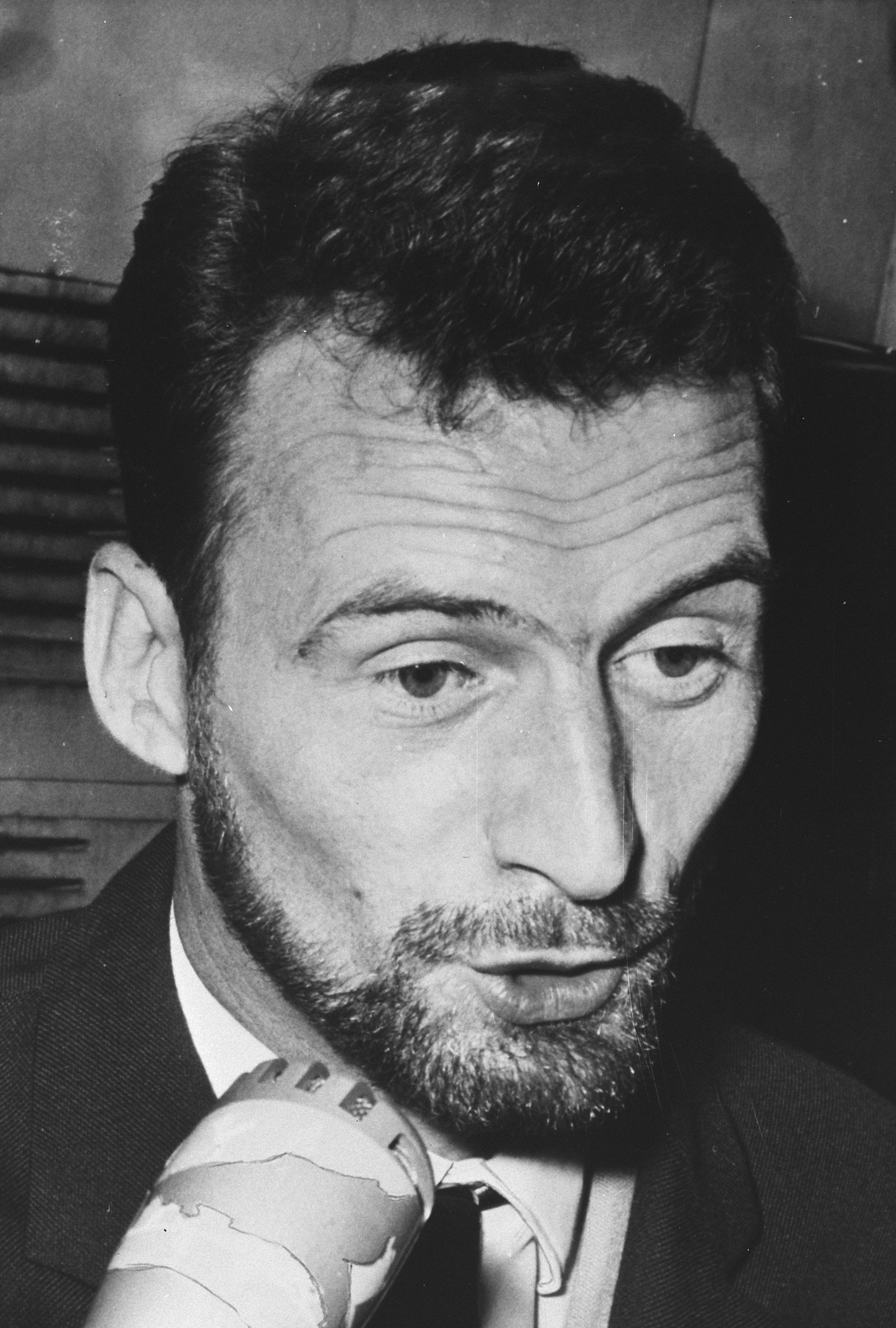
Pierre Lagaillarde (1961)

Pierre Lagaillarde (French pronunciation: [pjɛʁ laɡajaʁd]; Courbevoie, 15 May 1931 – 17 August 2014) was a French far-right politician, and a founder of the Organisation armée secrète (OAS), a clandestine militant organisation that sought to prevent Algeria's independence from French colonial rule.

Lagaillarde was a lawyer at Blida in Algeria, a reserve officer of the paratroopers, and an elected deputy of Algiers. He was president of the Association générale des étudiants d'Alger (General Association of Algiers’ Students) in 1957, and took part in the Algiers insurrection of May 1958, which brought Charles de Gaulle back to power.

Lagaillarde was a member of the Comité de salut public which opposed Algerian independence, and occupied the Gouvernement général de l'Algérie (local colonial administration).

In January 1960, he became a leader of the insurrection during the week of the barricades. Lagaillarde was then detained in La Santé Prison in Paris, and while imprisoned, he was visited by Jean-Marie Le Pen. He took advantage of his parole to escape to Spain (along with Jean-Jacques Susini, Jean-Maurice Demarquet, Marcel Ronda and Fernand Féral Lefevre), where he was joined by Raoul Salan and co-founded the Organisation armée secrète on 3 December 1960. Deprived of his immunity as a deputy, he was sentenced in absentia to ten years of prison in March 1961.

In October 1961, he was arrested in Madrid, along with the Italian neofascist Guido Giannettini. The Spanish dictator, Francisco Franco, later exiled Lagaillarde to the Canary Islands.

Lagaillarde was pardoned by France through the 1968 amnesty law. Lagaillarde returned to mainland France and resumed work as a lawyer and opened a law firm in Auch where his son Jean-Pierre would eventually succeed him. Since the end of French Algeria, he remained silent about the events in which he took part.
