= 1961 French referendum on Algerian self-determination =

1961 vote in France and colonial Algeria on Algerian independence

- 8 January 1961
- Do you approve the bill submitted to the French people by the President of the Republic and concerning the self-determination of the populations of Algeria and the organization of the public authorities in Algeria prior to self-determination?

Results
Choice	Votes	%
For	17,447,669	74.99%
Against	5,817,775	25.01%
Valid votes	23,265,444	96.99%
Invalid or blank votes	721,469	3.01%
Total votes	23,986,913	100.00%
Registered voters/turnout	32,520,233	73.76%
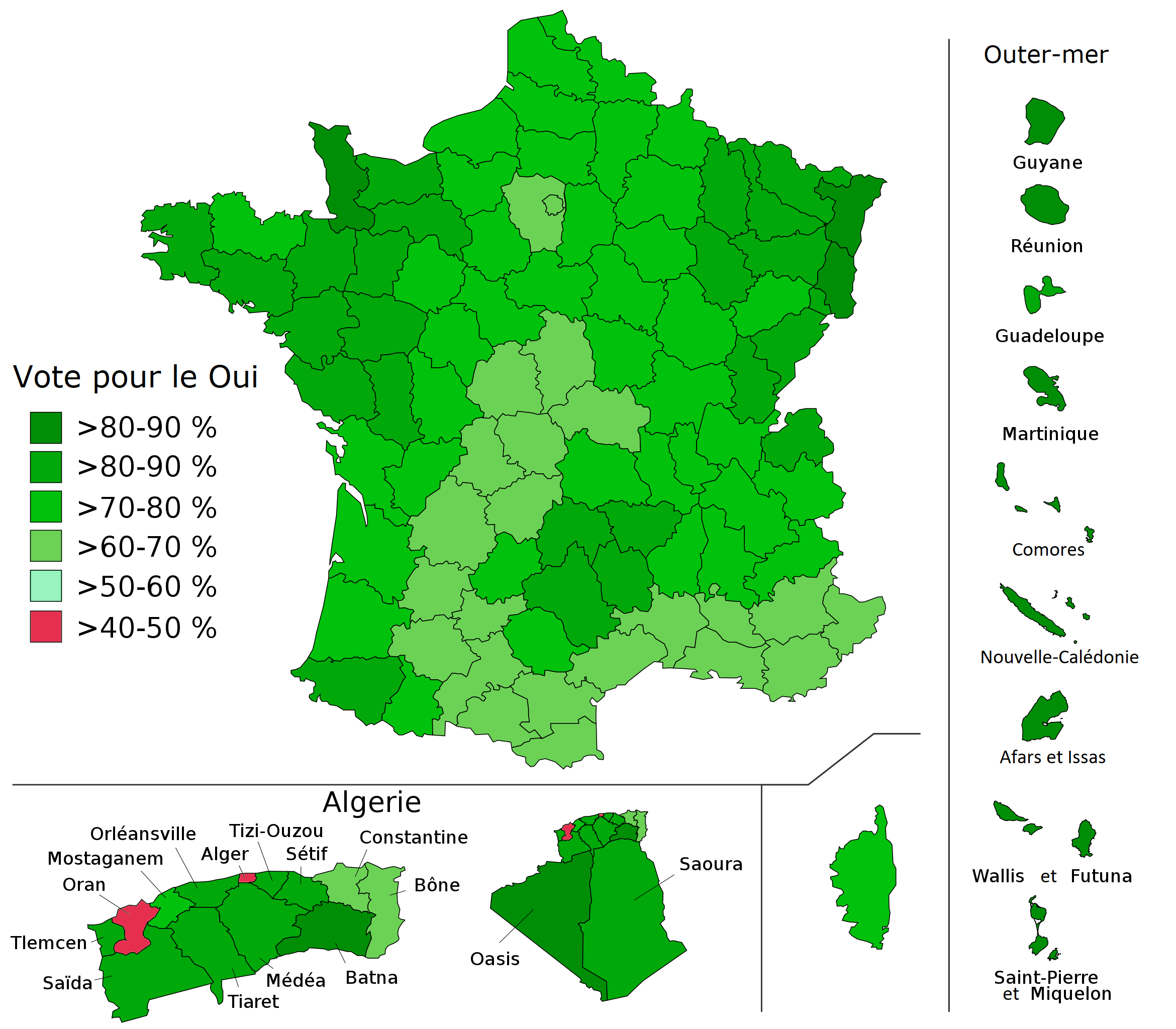
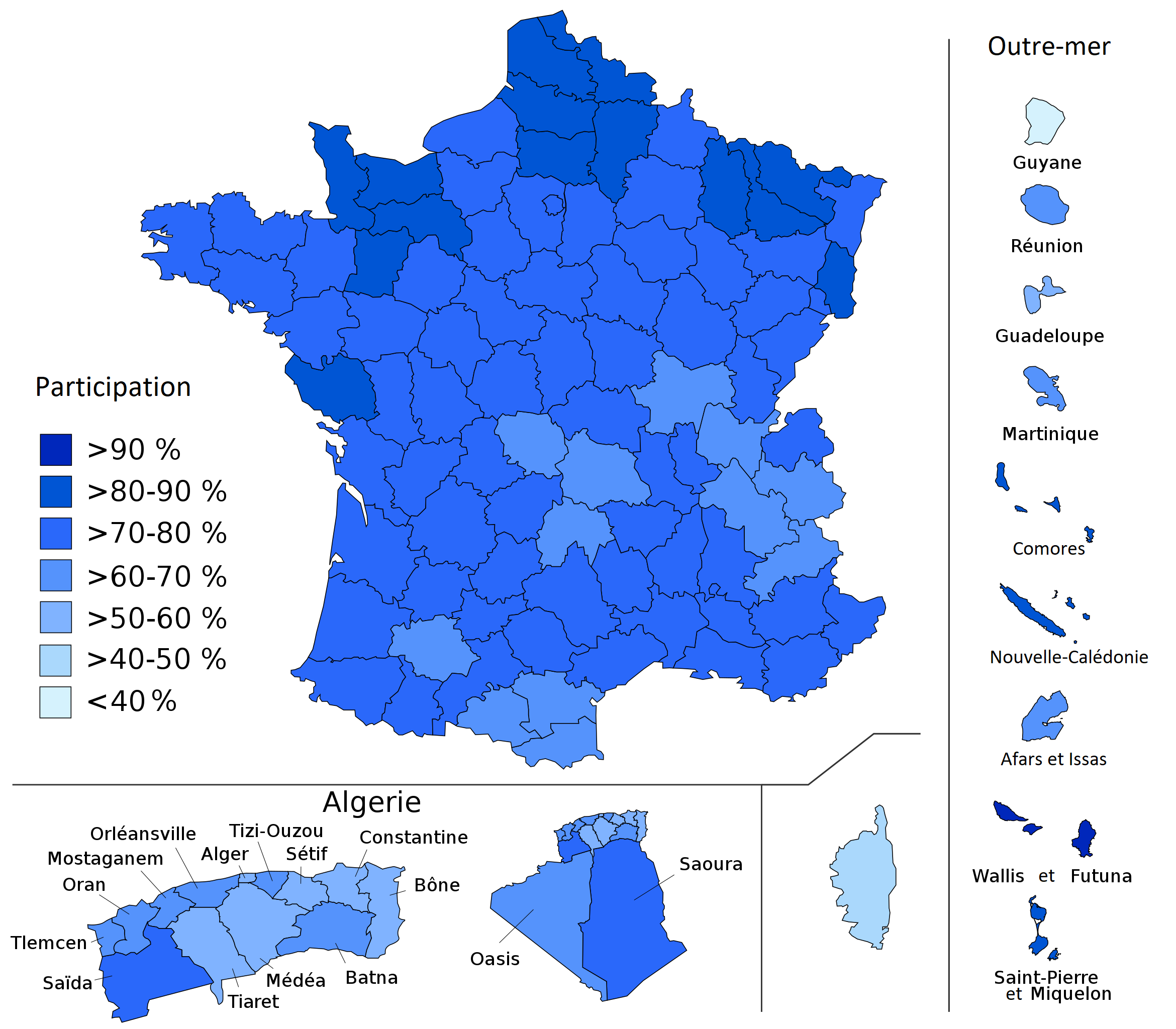
- Results by department

A referendum on self-determination for Algeria was held in France on 8 January 1961. Self-determination was approved by 75% of voters overall and 70% in Algeria. Voter turnout was 92%. The referendum question was worded as follows:

"Approuvez-vous le projet de loi soumis au peuple français par le président de la République et concernant l'autodétermination des populations algériennes et l'organisation des pouvoirs publics en Algérie avant l'autodétermination ?"

"Do you approve the bill submitted to the French people by the President of the Republic and concerning the self-determination of the populations of Algeria and the organization of the public authorities in Algeria prior to self-determination?"

== Results ==
Choice	Metropolitan France		Algeria		Total	
Choice	Votes	%	Votes	%	Votes	%
For	15,200,073	75.3	1,749,969	69.5	17,447,669	75.0
Against	4,996,474	24.7	767,546	30.5	5,817,775	25.0
Invalid/blank votes	594,699	–	109,174	–	721,469	–
Total	20,791,246	100	2,626,689	100	23,986,913	100
Source: Nohlen & Stöver

== See also ==
- 1962 Algerian independence referendum
