= Alain de Boissieu =

French general (1915–2006)

Général Alain de Boissieu
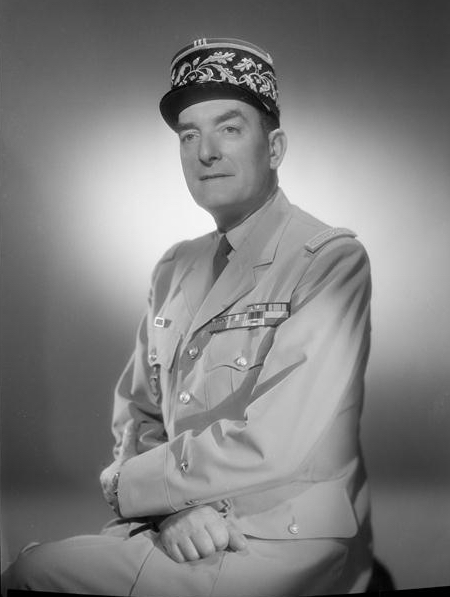
- General de Boissieu in 1965

Grand Chancellor of the Légion d'honneur and the Ordre national du Mérite
- In office 12 February 1975 – 4 June 1981
- Preceded by: Georges Cabanier
- Succeeded by: André Biard

42nd Chief of the Army Staff
- In office 1 May 1971 – 1 April 1975
- Preceded by: Émile Cantarel
- Succeeded by: Jean Lagarde

Personal details
- Born: Alain de Boissieu Déan de Luigné; 5 July 1915 Chartres, Eure-et-Loir, France
- Died: 5 April 2006 (aged 90) Clamart, Hauts-de-Seine, France
- Resting place: Colombey-les-Deux-Églises
- Spouse: Élisabeth de Gaulle (m. 1946)
- Children: 1
- Education: École spéciale militaire de Saint-Cyr; Saumur Cavalry School
- Awards: Grand Cross of the Legion of Honour; Order of Liberation

Military service
- Allegiance: Free France; France
- Branch/service: Free French Forces; French Army
- Years of service: 1936–1975
- Rank: Général d'armée
- Unit: 2nd Armored Division
- Battles/wars: World War II; Battle of France; Dieppe Raid; Battle of Madagascar; Operation Overlord; Liberation of Paris; Algerian War

Alain de Boissieu Déan de Luigné (French pronunciation: [alɛ̃ də bwasjø]; 5 July 1915 – 5 April 2006) was a French general who served in the Free French Forces during World War II, later becoming Army chief of staff (1971–1975). He was the son-in-law of General Charles de Gaulle, leader of the Free French and postwar President of France.

== Life ==
Son of a French noble family with title coming from Forez and Lyon (de Boissieu), Alain de Boissieu was a pupil at École Spéciale Militaire de Saint-Cyr (French military academy) in 1936 and Saumur (French cavalry school) in 1938. He was a cavalry officer during World War II and, with horses and sabre, made a successful charge (one of the last in cavalry history) against German troops on 11 June 1940.

A prisoner of the Germans, he managed to escape to the Soviet Union in March 1941. However Joseph Stalin was, at this time, an ally of Hitler. He was then sent for a while to a Soviet internment camp. Finally, after Germany invaded the Soviet Union in mid-1941, he joined General de Gaulle and the Free French Forces (FFL) in London.

As a Free French, Alain de Boissieu was involved in several military operations over Bayonne (Easter 1942) and Dieppe (Dieppe Raid, August 1942), in Madagascar and Djibouti with the FFL. He fought in the Battle of Normandy from 30 July 1944, as an officer of the famous 2nd Armored Division (French: 2ème division blindée) under General Philippe Leclerc de Hauteclocque, and was wounded on 12 August. He fought for the Liberation of Paris (25 August 1944).

In 1946, Alain de Boissieu married de Gaulle's daughter Élisabeth. They had one daughter Anne born in 1959

In 1956, he fought in the Algerian War. On 22 August 1962 he was in the same car as his father-in-law during the terrorist attack of Petit-Clamart planned by the Organisation armée secrète, when he saved the life of Charles de Gaulle.

As a general, he commanded the French military academy of Saint-Cyr, and of l'École militaire interarmes de Coëtquidan (1964).

He was Chief of Staff of the French Army (French: "chef d'État-major de l'Armée de Terre") from 1971 to 1975.

Alain de Boissieu became Grand Chancelier de l'ordre de la Légion d'Honneur and Chancelier de l'Ordre National du Mérite (1975–1981) and Chancelier de l'Ordre de la Libération (2002–2006). He resigned from the first two positions in 1981 in order not to be obligated to swear allegiance to, and present the Grand Necklace of the Légion d'Honneur to, newly elected French President François Mitterrand, who had called his father-in-law, Charles de Gaulle, a "dictator" in the 1960s.

== Books by Alain de Boissieu ==
- "Pour Combattre avec de Gaulle (1940–1945)", Paris, 1981.
- "Pour servir le Général (1946–1970)", Paris, 1982.

== Sources ==
- Biography in L'Ordre de la Libération (in French)
