= Commando Delta =

French OAS assassination teams in Algeria

Organisation armée secrète (OAS) flag

The Commando Delta were death squads of the Organisation armée secrète (OAS) active in French Algeria during the early 1960s. They "interdicted" European neighbourhoods by summarily executing any Muslims who entered. The Commando Delta were established by Roger Degueldre in 1961 during the final stages of the Algerian War; the word "Delta" signified Degueldre, a lieutenant who deserted from the French Foreign Legion in 1961.

Commando Delta units were also responsible for the assassination of people considered as traitors by the OAS. However, a certain number of killings were alleged to have been done by the Service de documentation extérieure et de contre-espionnage (SDECE) to discredit the OAS, with such allegations ascribing them to the Service d'Action Civique or the La Main Rouge. As a result, it is not possible to clearly define which actions were ascribable to the Commando Delta in the chaotic situation of the time.

== Organisation ==
- BAO - Bureau d'Action Opérationnelle, (Lieutenant Roger Degueldre, Adjutant Lieutenant Pierre Delhomme), in charge of operations
  - Commandos Delta (Lieutenant Roger Degueldre)
    - Delta 1 (Albert Dovecar)
    - Delta 2 (Wilfried Schliederman)
    - Delta 3 (Jean-Pierre Ramos)
    - Delta 4 (Lieutenant Jean-Loup Blanchy)
    - Delta 5 (Josué Giner, dit « Jésus de Bab-el-Oued »)
    - Delta 6 (Gabriel Anglade)
    - Delta 7 (Jacques Sintes)
    - Delta 9 (Jo Rizza)
    - Delta 10 (Joseph-Edouard Slama)
    - Delta 11 (Paul Mancilla)
    - Delta 24 (Marcel Ligier)
    - Delta 33 (Jacques Bixio)

== The Algerian War ==
The Commando Delta notably participated in the following actions :

- Château-Royal assassinations : assassinations of six persons associated with social centers;
- Opération Rock and Roll: 120 explosions in two hours on the night of 5–6 March 1962;
- The "March 22, 1962 murders", which led to the isolation of the Bab El Oued quarter of Algiers, the followed by a counter-protest by the OAS.
- The Petit-Clamart attack : the assassination attempt on Charles de Gaulle of 1962.

Several thousand murders of Algerians were attributed to the OAS.

== Later use of the Commando Delta name ==
The Commando Delta name has been used in more recent times by elements of the French extreme right:

- November 1977: attack on a communist bookstore in Toulon.
- 2 December 1977: assassination of Laïd Sebaï of the Amicale des Algériens en Europe ("Friends of Algerians in Europe") in Paris.
- 4 December 1977: bombing of an Algerian workers' foyer (lodging) in Marange-Silvange.
- 11 December 1977: Molotov cocktails were used against the Sonacotra foyer in Strasbourg-Meinau.
- 14 December 1977: attempted Molotov cocktail attack against a Sonocotra foyer in La Garde.
- 27 December 1977: attack against a union hall in Cambrai, resulting in minor damage.
- 31 December 1977: bombing of the Marcoing city hall.
- 14 March 1978: attack on the Amicale des Algériens offices in Toulon.
- 24 March 1978: attack on a French Communist Party office in Toulon.
- 4 May 1978: assassination of Henri Curiel in Paris.
- 7 April 1980: fire set at the door of a militant Communist in Aubervilliers.
- 7 June 1980: fire set at the house of a Community party member in Aubervilliers.
- 3 March 1981: attempted parcel bomb attack against a director of the Le Monde newspaper.
- 30 September 1983: Commandos Delta claim credit for an attack on the International Forum at the Palais des Congrès in Marseille, 1 dead, 26 injured.

== Bibliography ==
- Yves Courrière, La guerre d'Algérie, tome 4 : Les feux du désespoir, Fayard, 1969
- Arnaud Déroulède, OAS : étude d'une organisation clandestine, Curutchet, 1997
- Vincent Guibert, Les commandos Delta, Curutchet, 2000
- Georges Fleury, Histoire secrète de l'O.A.S., Grasset & Fasquelle, 2002
- Rémi Kauffer, OAS : histoire d'une guerre franco-française, Seuil, 2002
