= Évian Accords =

1962 peace treaty for Algerian independence from France

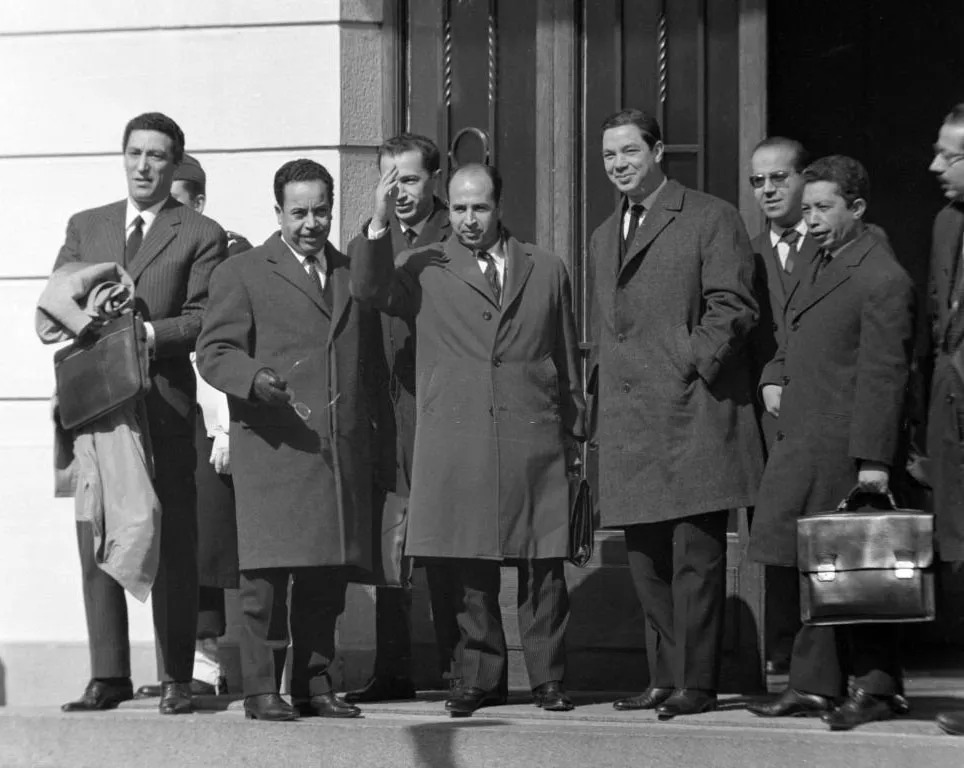
- FLN delegation. From left to right: Taïeb Boulahrouf, Saâd Dahlab, Mohamed Seddik Benyahia, Krim Belkacem, Benmostefa Benaouda, Redha Malek, Lakhdar Bentobal, M'Hamed Yazid and Seghir Mostefaï.
- Signed: 18 March 1962
- Location: Évian-les-Bains, France
- Signatories: (France) Louis Joxe; (Algeria) Krim Belkacem
- Parties: (France) French Republic; Provisional Government of Algeria
- Languages: French

The Évian Accords were a set of declarations between the French Government and the Provisional Government of the Algerian Republic on 18 March 1962 in Évian-les-Bains which outlined the agreements for Algeria's Independence alongside cooperation with France. The Accords consisted of five chapters which detailed the guarantees and principals of this Independence. The Accords ended the Algerian War with a cease-fire that was declared on the 19th March 1962, and effectively formalised the status of Algeria as an independent nation.

== Historical Context ==
The start of the Algerian War in 1954 emerged from a growing Algerian nationalist movement. The population was asked to fight in the Second World War alongside the French. In exchange for their duty, they demanded more political and economic rights which were refused. The tensions between the two parties rose when the National Liberation Front (FLN) called for independence in their Declaration of 1 November 1954. The French Government led by Pierre Mendès France declined their requests because of the pressure established by the pieds-noirs and the political context in France.

The war escalated until 1958 with the end of the Fourth Republic and the arrival of Charles de Gaulle to power. This accelerated the process of Independence. On 16 September 1959, de Gaulle acknowledged the principle of self-determination for Algeria. He recognised the FLN as the chosen intermediary to negotiate the terms for independence which led to the referendum on Algerian self-determination on 8 January 1961 for both France and Algeria. The outcome of the referendum was the negotiations between the French government and the FLN in Évian between March 7 and March 18, 1962 leading to the Accords.

== Content ==
=== Summary ===
The Évian Accords consisted of 93 pages of agreements and arrangements. The Accords covered cease-fire arrangements, prisoner releases, the recognition of full sovereignty and right to self-determination of Algeria. They also detailed guarantees of protection, non-discrimination, and property rights for all Algerian citizens. A section dealing with military issues outlined the withdrawal of French forces over a period of two years, with the exception of those garrisoning at the French military base of Mers El Kébir. Other provisions pledged that there would be no sanctions for any acts committed prior to the ceasefire.

=== Chapter 1: Organisation of Public Powers During the Transition Period and Self-Determination Guarantees ===
Chapter One stated that a referendum would be held to determine Algeria's independence through cooperation with France. It was established that should a self-determination vote succeed, the National Liberation Front (F.L.N) would be recognised as a legal political body.

=== Chapter 2: Independence and Cooperation ===
Chapter Two covered the specifics of Algeria's independence, and what its cooperation with France would entail. It declared that upon a vote of self-determination, the Algerian State would in its own rights exercise full and complete sovereignty. This section also guaranteed the interests of France in exchange for France's provision of technical and cultural assistance, and social and economic aid. These interests referred specifically to the exercise of mining titles granted by France, preference in granting new mining titles to French companies, and the purchase of Saharan hydrocarbons to be conducted in francs.

=== Chapter 3: Settlement of Military Questions ===
Chapter Three covered the withdrawal of French forces from Algerian territory. It was established that they would be gradually reduced following the initial ceasefire, and fully withdrawn from the frontiers of Algeria after a vote of self-determination.

This section also referred to the agreements of Algeria and France's military cooperation, dictating that the Mers-el-Kebir naval base in the Oran should be leased to France for a period of 15 years. It also granted France a number of military airfields within Algerian territory.

=== Chapter 4: Settlement of Litigation ===
Chapter Four granted both states recourse to the International Court of Justice if any differences that arose could not be settled through either arbitration of conciliation.

=== Chapter 5: Consequences of Self-Determination ===
Chapter Five outlined the consequences of self-determination as the following: Algeria's Independence from France would be recognised by France immediately, the transfer of jurisdiction would be realised, any regulations would come into force simultaneously, and that an election for the Algerian National Assembly would be organised by the provisional executive within a period of three weeks.

== The vote ==
In a referendum held on 8 April 1962, the French electorate approved the Accords, with almost 91% in favour. The final result was 17,866,423 in favour of Algerian independence, and 1,809,074 against.

Following this result Charles de Gaulle stated that, “France has no interest in keeping Algeria in its law and subservience that chooses another fate.”

On 1 July, the Accords were subject to a second referendum in Algeria, where with 5,975,581 voted for independence and just 16,534 against. De Gaulle pronounced Algeria an independent country on 3 July.

== The negotiators ==
Algerian delegation

- Krim Belkacem
- Hamoud Ameur
- Saad Dahlab
- Benmostefa Benaouda
- Lakhdar Bentobal
- Taïeb Boulahrouf
- Mohamed Seddik Benyahia
- Seghir Mostefaï
- Redha Malek
- Ali Mimouni
- Mhamed Yazid
- Ahmed Boumendjel
- Ahmed Francis

French delegation

- Louis Joxe
- Bernard Tricot
- Roland Cadet
- Yves Roland-Billecart
- Claude Chayet
- Bruno de Leusse
- Vincent Labouret
- Jean Simon
- Hubert de Seguins Pazzis
- Robert Buron
- Jean de Broglie

== Outcome of Agreements ==
On 19 March 1962, the French Government and the Provisional Government of the Algerian Republic declared a ceasefire agreement; ending a seven year war. The agreement resulted in a popular referendum which was held on the 1 July 1962, after which Algeria was pronounced an independent country on the 3 July 1962. The following period was marked by a struggle between rival factions for political power in the newly formed state. Under the Evian Accords, the Provisional Government of the Algerian Republic (GPRA) was granted mandate to form government. However, the authority of the GPRA was challenged by the Political Bureau led by Ahmed Ben Bella. On the 22 September 1962, after two months of civil conflict, Ben Bella was instated at the first president of the Democratic and Popular Republic of Algeria.

French President Charles de Gaulle wanted to maintain French interests in the area, including industrial and commercial primacy and control over Saharan oil reserves. In addition, the European French community (the colon population), the pieds-noirs and indigenous Sephardi Jews in Algeria were guaranteed religious freedom and property rights as well as French citizenship with the option to choose between French and Algerian citizenship after three years. In exchange, Algeria received access to technical assistance and financial aid from the French government. Algerians were permitted to continue freely circulating between their country and France for work, although they would not have political rights equal to French citizens. The OAS right-wing movement opposed the negotiations through a series of bombings and an assassination attempt against De Gaulle at Clamart in Paris in August 1962.

Regarding Chapter 3 and the Settlement of Military Negotiations, France was permitted to maintain its naval base at Mers El Kébir for another fifteen years and facilities for underground nuclear testing in the Sahara; France withdrew from the base in 1967, only five years after the agreement.

Outside of these agreements, the historian Alistair Horne comments that most provisions of the Evian Accords were overtaken by events. The wholesale exodus of almost all of the million-strong European community immediately prior to independence made the three year transition clauses a dead letter, while the widespread killings of Muslims who had served as auxiliaries (harkis) with the French Army was in direct contravention of the amnesty provisions of the treaty.

== Opposition ==
One of the primary forces of opposition to the signing of the Evian Accords and the formation of an independent Algerian State was the Secret Army Organisation (OAS). Their opposition was aimed at thwarting negotiations between the French Government and the GPRA with the goal of keeping Algeria under French sovereignty. Their actions were rooted in a desire to preserve a 'French Algeria' and to prevent the loss of Algeria as one of France's three overseas departments. Furthermore, they opposed the establishment of an Algerian Republic under a majority Arab Algerian rule.

In the lead up to the ceasefire agreement on 19 March 1962, the Algerian newspaper El Moujahid reported more than 1,420 bombings between April 23 and August 15 of 1961. The group rejected the ceasefire, adopted a scorched earth policy to destroy the Algerian economy, and terrorist attacks against Muslims in order to provoke a response from the ALN. It also carried out multiple attempts of assassination on Charles de Gaulle such as the Petit-Clamart attack.

== See also ==
- Proposed partition of Algeria
- Fifth French Republic
- France in the twentieth century
- Algerian Nationalism

== Bibliography ==
- Adler, Stephen. International Migration and Dependence. Gower Publishing Company, Ltd. (Hampshire: 1977).
- Barkaoui, Miloud (Spring 1999). "Kennedy and the Cold War imbroglio - the case of Algeria's independence". Arab Studies Quarterly. 21 (2). Archived from the original on 13 November 2004 – via FindArticles.
- Horne, Alistair (2017). A Savage War of Peace: Algeria, 1954-1962. Cambridge University Press.
- McDougall, James. (2017). A History of Algeria. Cambridge University Press.
- McDougall, James. (2006). History and the culture of nationalism in Algeria. Cambridge University Press.
