= Pieds-noirs =

French people born in Colonial Algeria, and their descendants

Pieds-Noirs
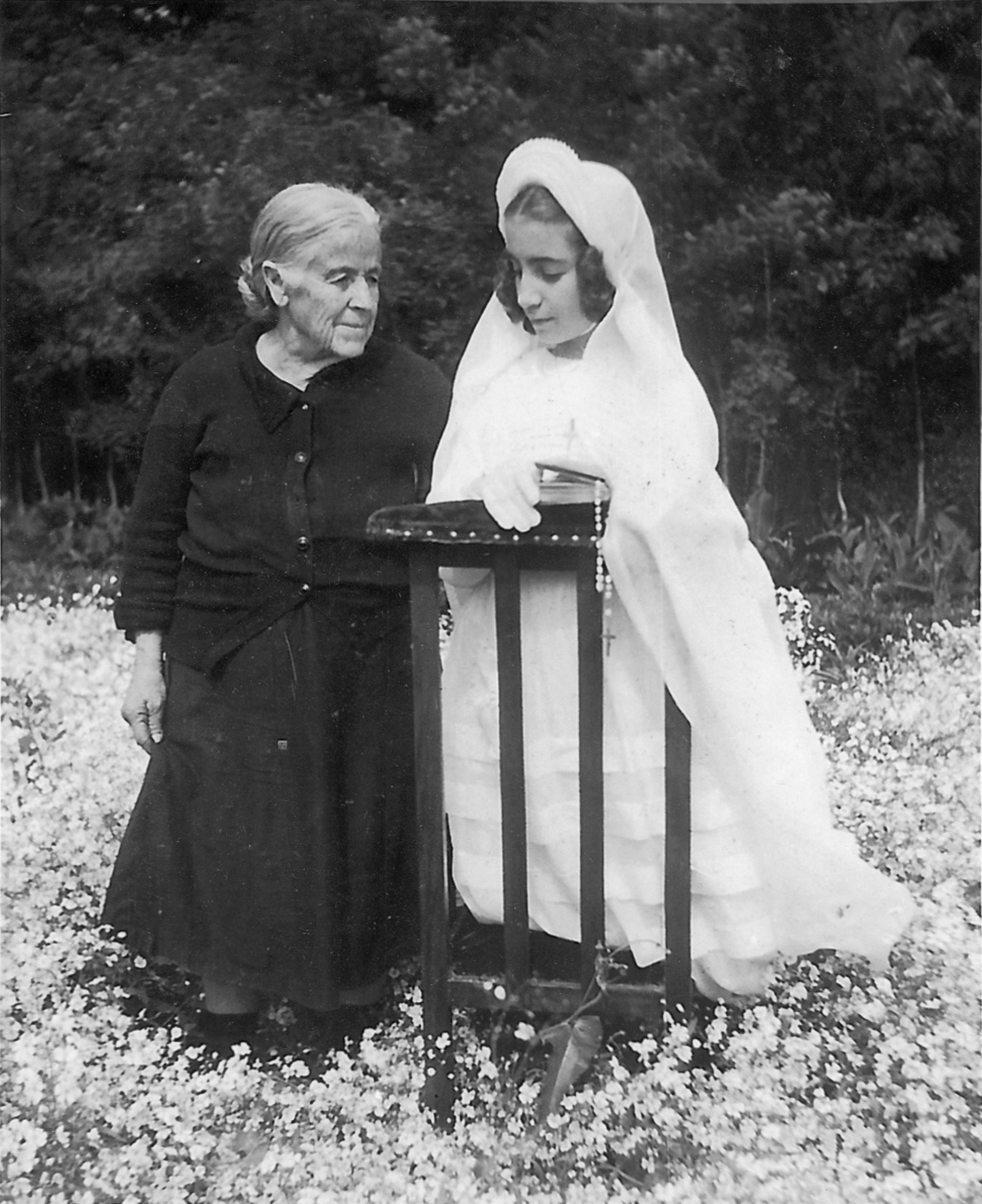
- A First Communion in a Pied-Noir family in Sidi-Bel-Abbès, French Algeria, in the early 20th century

Total population
- 1959: 1.4 million (13% of the population of Algeria); 2012: 3.2 million (in France)

Regions with significant populations
- Algiers, Oran, Constantine

Languages
- French, Catalan, Spanish, Occitan, Maghrebi Arabic, Italian, Maltese, Arpitan

Religion
- Predominantly: Christianity: (Catholicism, Protestantism); Minority: Judaism

The Pieds-Noirs (French pronunciation: [pje nwaʁ]; lit. 'black feet'; sing.: Pied-Noir) are an ethno-cultural group of people of French and other European descent who were born in Algeria during the period of French rule from 1830 to 1962. Many of them departed for mainland France during and after the Algerian War of Independence.

From the French conquest on 18 June 1830 to its independence, Algeria was administratively part of France; its ethnic European population were simply called Algerians or colons (colonists). The Muslim people of Algeria were called Arabs, Berbers (Amazighs), Touregs, Muslims or indigènes. The term pied-noir came into common use shortly before the end of the Algerian War in 1962.

As of the last census in French-ruled Algeria, taken on 1 June 1960, there were 1,050,000 non-Muslim civilians, some 10 percent of the population. Most pieds-noirs were Catholic and of European descent, but their population included around 130,000 indigenous Algerian Jews who were granted French citizenship through the Crémieux Decree and were viewed as a part of the pieds-noirs community.

During the Algerian War, a vast majority of pieds-noirs were loyalists and overwhelmingly supported the French rule in Algeria. They were opposed to Algerian nationalist groups such as the Front de libération nationale (English: National Liberation Front) (FLN) and Mouvement national algérien (English: Algerian National Movement) (MNA). The roots of the conflict lay in political and economic inequalities perceived as an "alienation" from the French rule as well as a demand for a leading position for the Berber, Arab and Islamic cultures and rules existing before the French conquest. The conflict contributed to the fall of the French Fourth Republic and the exodus of European and Jewish Algerians to France.

After Algeria became independent in 1962, about 800,000 pieds-noirs of French nationality evacuated to mainland France, while about 200,000 remained in Algeria. Of the latter, there were still about 100,000 in 1965, about 50,000 by the end of the 1960s and 30,000 in 1993. During the Algerian Civil War between 1992 and 2002, the remaining population of pieds-noirs and others of European descent plummeted, as they were often targeted by Islamist rebel groups. By the 2000s, the French consulate in Algiers recorded that around 300 people of European descent remained in the country, whereas an Algerian census company recorded the number as higher. The pieds-noirs who have stayed since independence are now overwhelmingly elderly.

Those who moved to France suffered ostracism from some left-wing political movements for their perceived exploitation of native Muslims, while others blamed them for the war and thus for the political turmoil surrounding the collapse of the Fourth Republic. In popular culture, the community is often represented as feeling removed from French culture while longing for Algeria. The recent history of the pieds-noirs has been characterized by a sense of twofold alienation, on the one hand from the land of their birth and on the other from their adopted homeland. Though the term rapatriés d'Algérie implies that prior to Algeria they once lived in France, most pieds-noirs were born and raised in Algeria.

== Etymology ==
Generic "black feet" emblem used by post-independence pied-noir associations

There are competing theories about the origin of the term pied-noir. According to the Oxford English Dictionary, it refers to "a person of European origin living in Algeria during the period of French rule, especially a French person expatriated after Algeria was granted independence in 1962". The Le Robert dictionary states that in 1901 the word indicated a sailor working barefoot in the coal room of a ship, who would find his feet blackened by the soot and dust. Since in the Mediterranean this was often an Algerian native, the term was used pejoratively for Algerians until 1955, when it first began referring to "French born in Algeria" according to some sources. The Oxford English Dictionary claims this usage originated from mainland French as a negative nickname.

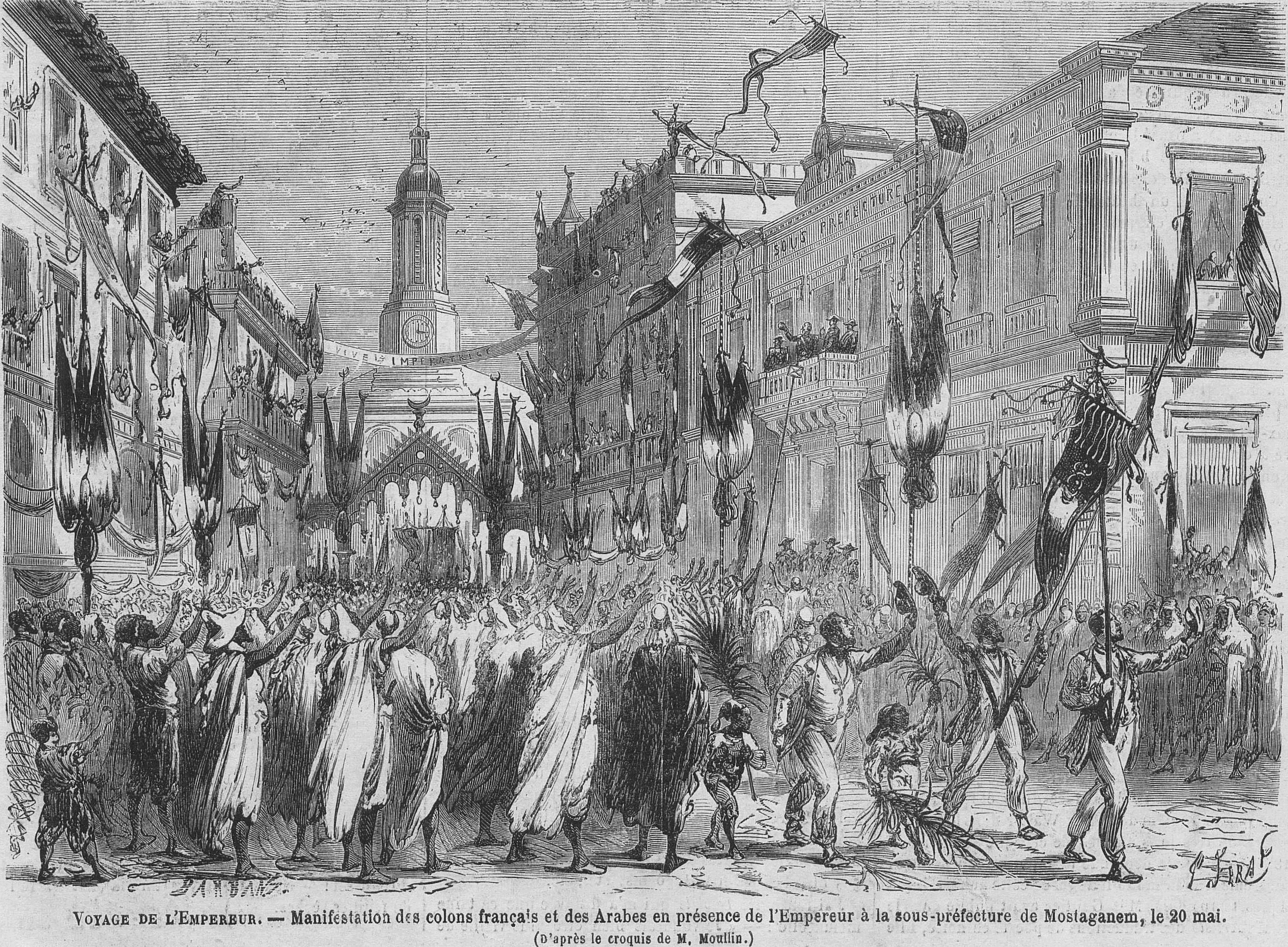
Napoléon III "greets the French colonists and the Arabs" from a balcony in Mostaganem during his official visit to Algeria in 1865. Sketch by M. Moulin published in The Illustrated World, 1865.

There is also a theory that the term comes from the black boots worn by French soldiers compared to the barefoot Algerians. Other theories focus on new settlers dirtying their clothing by working in swampy areas, wearing black boots when on horseback, or trampling grapes to make wine.

== History ==
French, along with Spanish, Italian and other European settlers, moved to France's overseas colonies and territories. The largest group of one million settled in Algeria, followed by 200,000 in Morocco and proportionally fewer in other colonies. These settlers often took land that had been forcibly taken from the local population. While they had full political representation in Paris and the French government, the native population did not. Many settlers were fiercely committed to maintaining the overseas empire because they came from impoverished European backgrounds. Nearly half of the Algerian settlers in the 1880s were from Spain, southern Italy, or Malta, and the remainder were mostly poor French. They had nothing to return to if a local nationalist movement won its war of national liberation.

=== French conquest and initial settlement ===
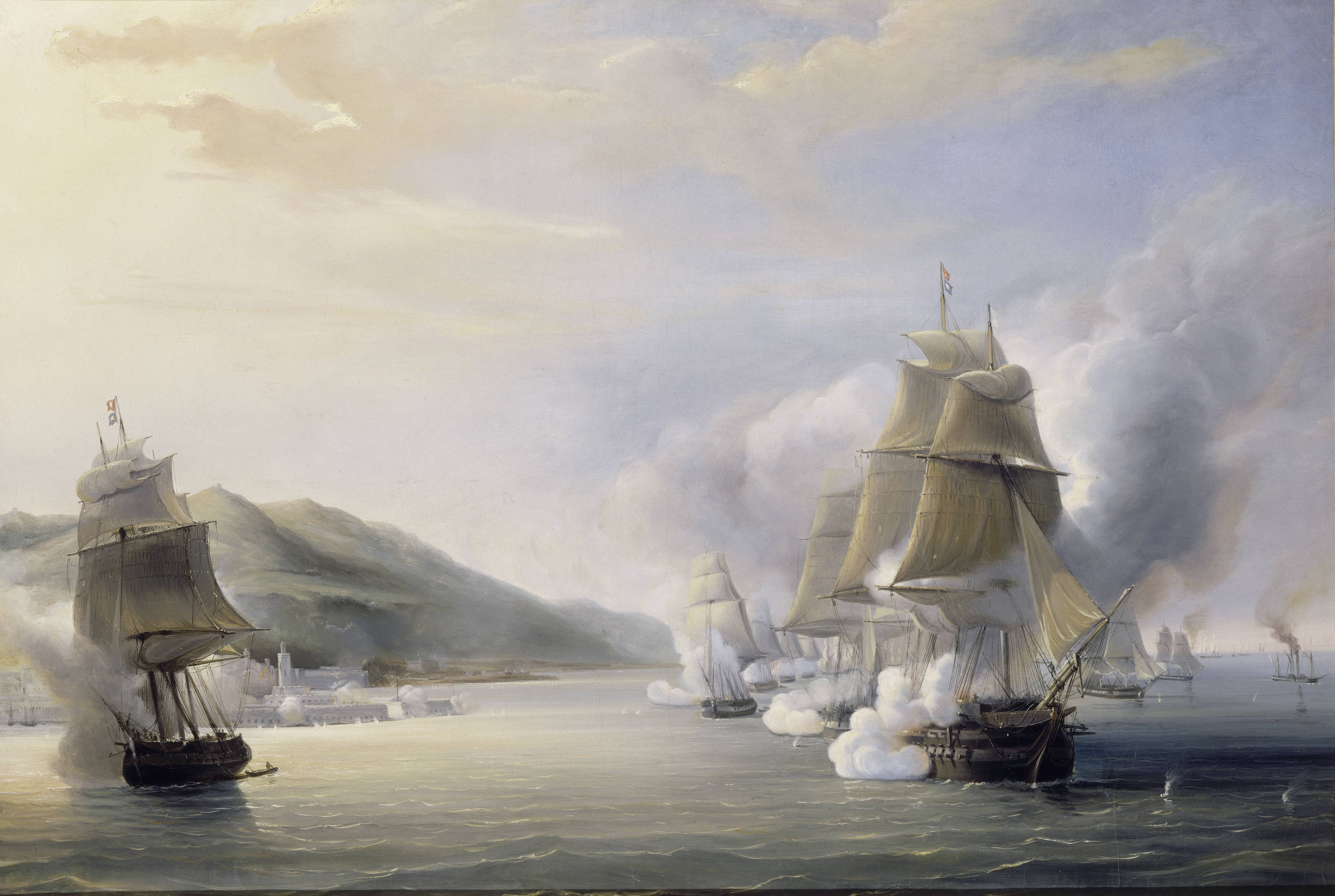
Bombardment of Algeria by Admiral Duperré's forces in 1830

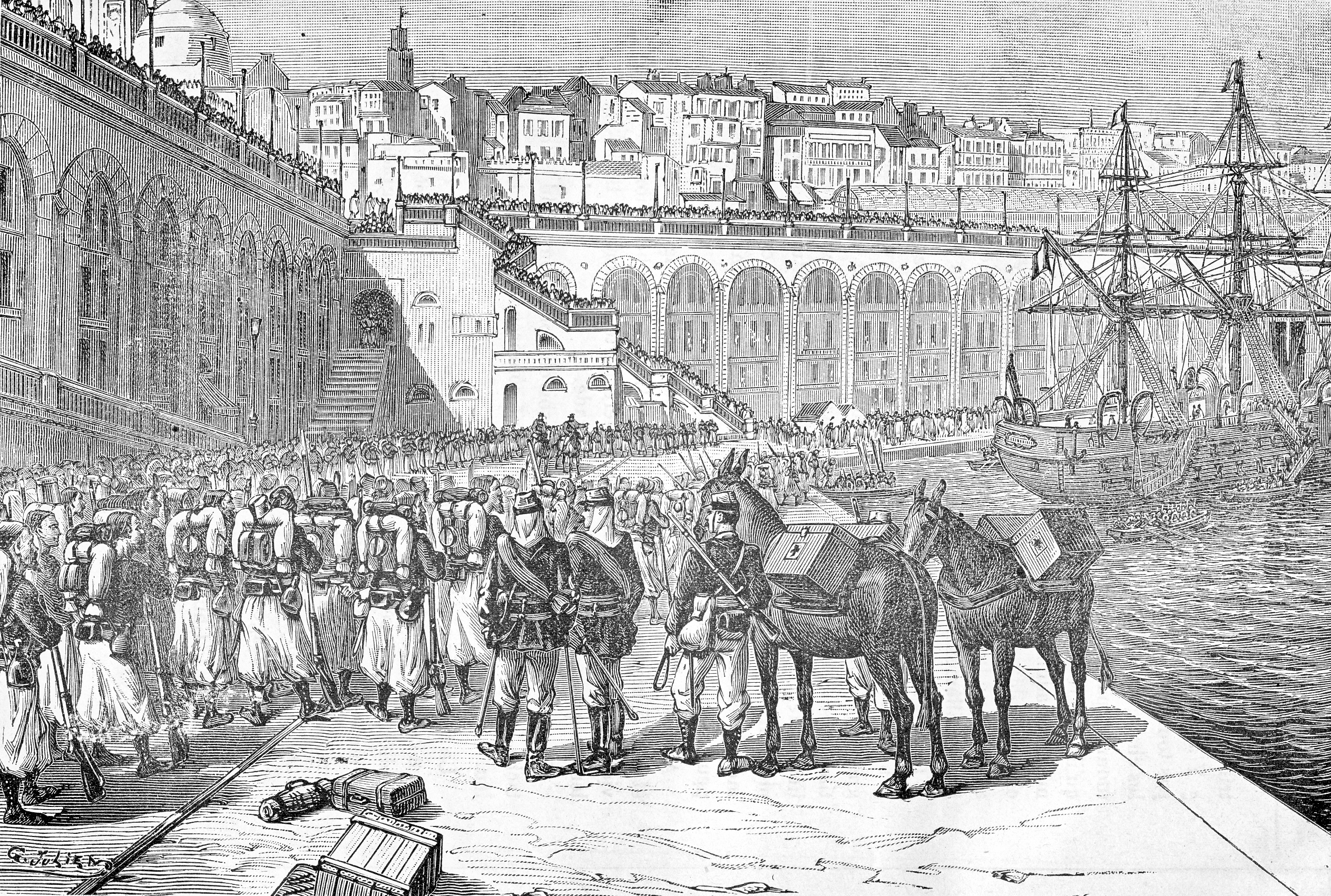
Zouaves embarking at Algiers for Tonkin, January 1885

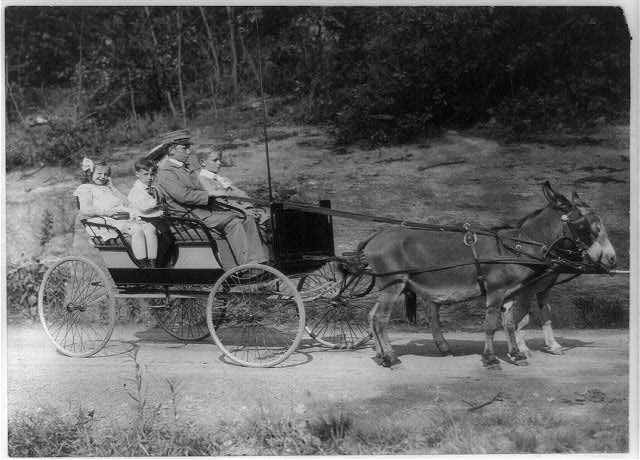
Three children in a wagon pulled by two donkeys, c. 1905. The first pieds-noirs were the children of personnel of the French Army of Africa.

European settlement of Algeria began during the 1830s, after France had commenced the process of conquest with the military seizure of the city of Algiers in 1830. The invasion was instigated when the Dey of Algiers struck the French consul with a fly-swatter in 1827, although economic reasons are also cited. In 1830 the government of King Charles X blockaded Algeria and an armada sailed to Algiers, followed by a land expedition. A troop of 34,000 soldiers landed on 18 June 1830, at Sidi Ferruch, 27 kilometres (17 mi) west of Algiers. Following a three-week campaign, the Hussein Dey capitulated on 5 July 1830 and was exiled.

In the 1830s the French controlled only the northern part of the country. Entering the Oran region, they faced resistance from Emir Abd al-Kader, a leader of a Sufi Brotherhood. In 1839 Abd al-Kader began a seven-year war by declaring jihad against the French. The French signed two peace treaties with Al-Kader, but they were broken because of a miscommunication between the military and the government in Paris. In response to the breaking of the second treaty, Abd al-Kader drove the French to the coast. In response, a French force of nearly 100,000 troops marched to the Algerian countryside and forced Abd al-Kader's surrender in 1847.

In 1848 Algeria was divided into three departments (Alger, Oran and Constantine), thus becoming part of France.

The French modeled their colonial system on their predecessors, the Ottomans, by co-opting local tribes. In 1843 the colonists began supervising through bureaux arabes operated by military officials with authority over particular domains.

This system lasted until the 1880s and the rise of the French Third Republic, when colonisation intensified. Large-scale regrouping of lands began when land-speculation companies took advantage of government policy that allowed massive sales of native property. By the 20th century Europeans held 1,700,000 hectares; by 1940, 2,700,000 hectares, about 35 to 40 percent; and by 1962 it was 2,726,700 hectares representing 27 percent of the arable land of Algeria.

=== Development as a society ===
==== Identity ====
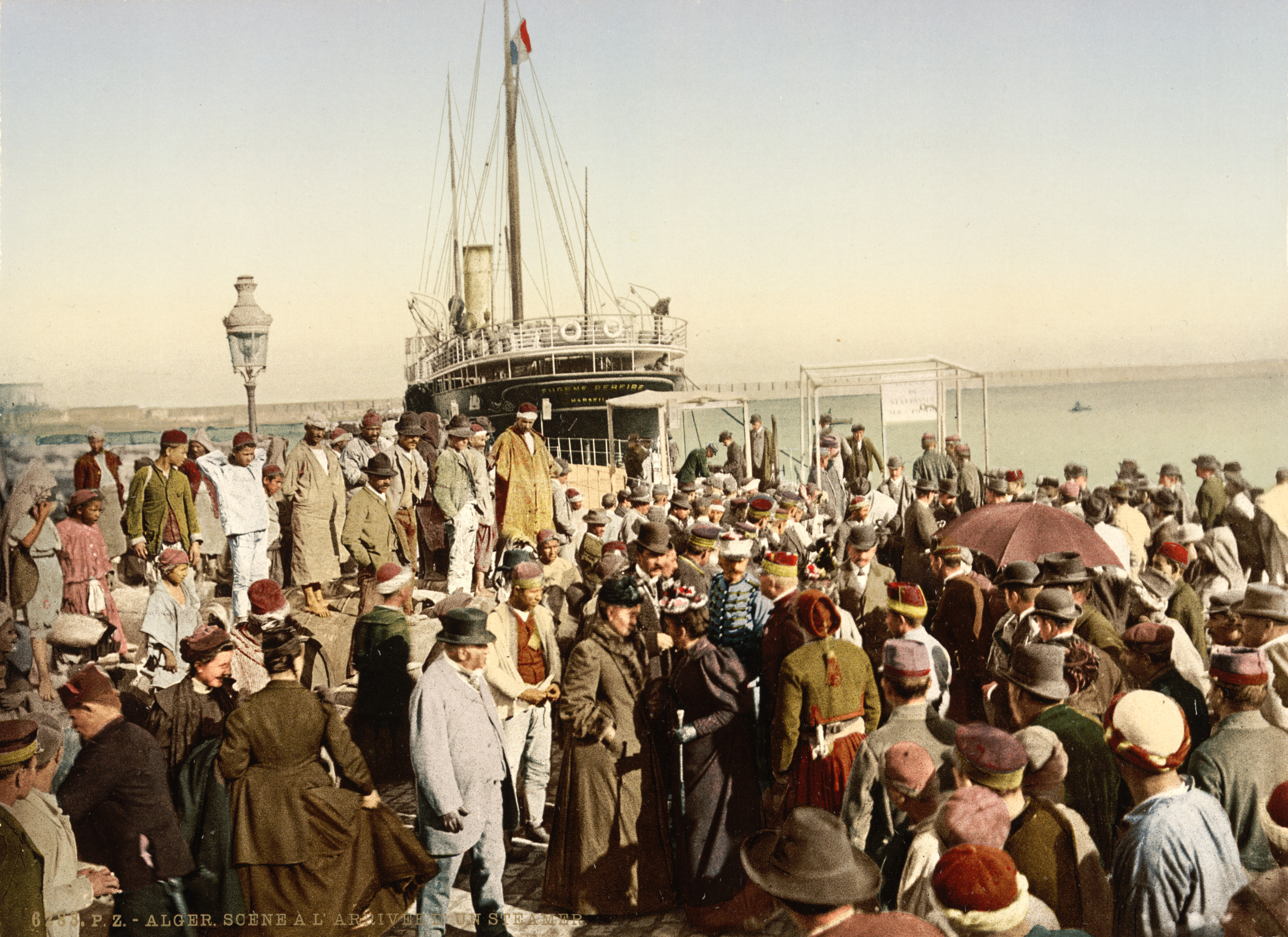
Arrival of a steam ship, Algiers, Algeria, c. 1899

After French Algeria was redesignated from a colony into a Department of France in 1848, the country was considered an integral part of French national territory, and this sentiment was largely shared by the pieds-noirs community.

Although the majority of pieds-noirs were of French origin, many settlers continued to arrive from across the Western Mediterranean region from the 1830s into the twentieth century, particularly Italy, Spain and Malta. Some early European settlers in Algeria formed enclaves based on their country of origin, sometimes as a result of policies undertaken by the French colonial administration. For example, settlers from the Spanish island of Minorca were settled by the French army in the Hussein Dey and Bordj El Kiffan (at the time Fort de l'Eau) districts of Algiers in which they formed a substantial local community. The city of Oran contained a large European population of Spanish heritage which later increased as a result of the Spanish Civil War. As French Algerian society developed, European Algerians of all geographical background began to largely fall under the pieds-noirs label or be considered as Français d’Algérie (French of Algeria), and evolved into a society influenced by French language and social customs, but with their own unique identity and culture. French newspaper Le Figaro claimed in 1961 that "the Europeans of Algeria [...] have become increasingly independent of French tutelage, and having adapted to the environment, or better yet, to the soil, have become a new race." According to Ohio State University history scholar Daniela N. Edmeier, the French state even questioned how pieds-noirs could be integrated into French society after a majority fled to mainland France following Algerian independence due to the cultural and social differences that had built up over time.

The end of the French protectorate of Tunisia and of the French protectorate in Morocco in 1956 led to mass emigration of French settlers from both states to Algeria. These two countries had been placed under protectorate, whereas Algeria and its population fell under territory status and were considered part of overseas France.

As the colony of Algeria grew with each generation, pieds-noirs began to define themselves as distinct from the French citizens of metropolitan France; they identified as Algerian people. Some pieds-noirs considered themselves at one time to be "true Algerians", whereas they termed Muslim Algerians as "Indigenous" peoples. An exchange between a pied-noir student from Algiers and a metropolitan French student was recorded during a UNEF conference in 1922:

"So you're Algerian… but the son of a Frenchman, aren't you?"

"Of course! All Algerians are sons of the French, the others are natives."

However, many pieds-noirs avoided using the term after the Second World War so as not to be confused with indigenous Algerian migrant workers who went to France. The pieds-noirs themselves also used several nicknames to designate the French in metropolitan France, such as French from France, Frangaoui, Patos and sometimes pied-blanc (lit. 'white feet').

Other terms used internally within the pied-noir population included pied-rouge (lit. 'red feet') to refer to pied-noir members of the Algerian Communist Party or those who held left-wing beliefs, including a minority of pieds-noirs sympathetic to the independence movement. The term Pied-Gris was used to refer both to children with parentage from both metropolitan France and French Algeria, and to French settlers from independent Tunisia and Morocco who moved to French Algeria in the late 1950s rather than to France. French writer René Domergue noted that Pied-Gris was used by both French settlers from Tunisia and Morocco and the pieds-noirs themselves to distinguish themselves from each other. Algerian-born Pieds-noirs writer and historian Jean-Jacques Jordi documented that Mahonnais was used as a nickname for the descendants of settlers from the Balearic Islands who migrated to Algeria after the French conquest as agricultural workers.

After the French committed the Sétif and Guelma massacre (1945), with the French navy and air force shelling and bombing Algerian territory, native Algerians increasingly began to look towards increased autonomy or outright independence. In 1954, the Algerian nationalist and pro-independence FLN movement launched its first operations and this marked the start of the Algerian war, after which Algerian militant groups carried out attacks against both pieds-noirs and targets associated with the French colonial administration. The French government and military reacted with implementing a brutal torture regime inspired by the likes of French general Massu. The Organisation armée secrète (OAS) started to increase murders and bombings against Algerians and French who opposed further French control of Algeria. In response to the attacks committed by the FLN and political demands for independence, Pierre Mendès France, the-then President of the Council, expressed a distinction between the political status of Algeria compared to Tunisia and Morocco during an address to the French National Assembly:

We do not compromise when it comes to defending the internal peace of the nation, the unity, the integrity of the Republic. The departments of Algeria constitute a part of the French Republic. They have been French for a long time and irrevocably. Their populations, who enjoy French citizenship and are represented in Parliament, have moreover given in peace, as before in war, enough proof of their attachment to France for France, in its turn, not to allow in question this unit. Between them and the metropolis, there is no conceivable secession. Never France, no government, no French Parliament, whatever their particular tendencies, will ever yield on this fundamental principle. I affirm that no comparison with Tunisia or Morocco is more false, more dangerous. Here it is France."

==== Culture, food and language ====
French writer Léon Isnard noted that pieds-noirs often mixed traditional French and occasionally Spanish and Italian cuisine with local Arab and Jewish influences. Dishes such as gazpacho, paella, méchoui and brochette skewered meat were commonly consumed by the pied-noir population and often accompanied with white wine produced by pied-noir farmers in Tlemcen and red wine from Mascara.

Although French was the main language of the pieds-noirs, a distinct form of French known as pataouète developed in the pied-noir community in Algeria and contained words, idioms, expressions and slang terms not commonly found in Metropolitan France. Ferdinand Duchene noted that pataouète was largely derived from mainland French but contained words from Spanish and Catalan (influenced by Spanish workers in Algeria during the late 1800s), as well as Italian, and local Arab dialect.

Despite marked differences and disparities between the two communities, it was not uncommon for pieds-noirs to socially mix and form connections with their Arab neighbours as French Algerian society expanded. Those living in the countryside were known to adopt similar customs and habits to the native Algerian population. Intermingling between pieds-noirs and native Algerians was considered commonplace in rural Algerian towns such as Dellys, Sidi Daoud and Rébeval (today Baghlia) which contained significant European populations before the independence of Algeria.

==== Social structure ====
Like other white populations in colonial-era Africa, the pieds-noirs generally dominated much of Algeria's industrial, cultural and political institutions, comprising the most influential section of society. However, French Algeria also attracted laborers, farmers, blue collar and agricultural workers from metropolitan France, Spain, Italy and Malta in search of better economic opportunities. European manual laborers came under the pied-noir fold and acquired French nationality after several years of living in Algeria. As such, the pied-noir community contained different social classes and structures from wealthy landowners and affluent urban dwellers, middle-class intellectuals and professionals, to artisans and poor agricultural classes. The pieds-noir writer Albert Camus was born in impoverished circumstances. Following the exodus to France in the aftermath of the Algerian war, working-class pieds-noirs were particularly scathing in response to accusations from the French political left that they were exploiters or elite colonialists over the indigenous population. In 1955, Camus published an opinion column in L’Express in which he wrote against stereotyping in the metropolitan French press of the pied-noir population during the Algerian war: "When one reads certain newspapers, it looks like Algeria is populated by one million colonists wearing a tie, smoking a cigar, and riding a Cadillac… 80% of the Français d’Algérie are not colonists, but employees or small business owners. The employees’ standard of living, albeit superior to the Arabs’, is inferior to that of the metropolis." Pied-noir author Jean-Jacques Jordi wrote that the standards of living for the average pieds-noirs was more often than not higher than that of the Arab population but lower compared to people in mainland France.

=== Relationship to mainland France and Muslim Algeria ===
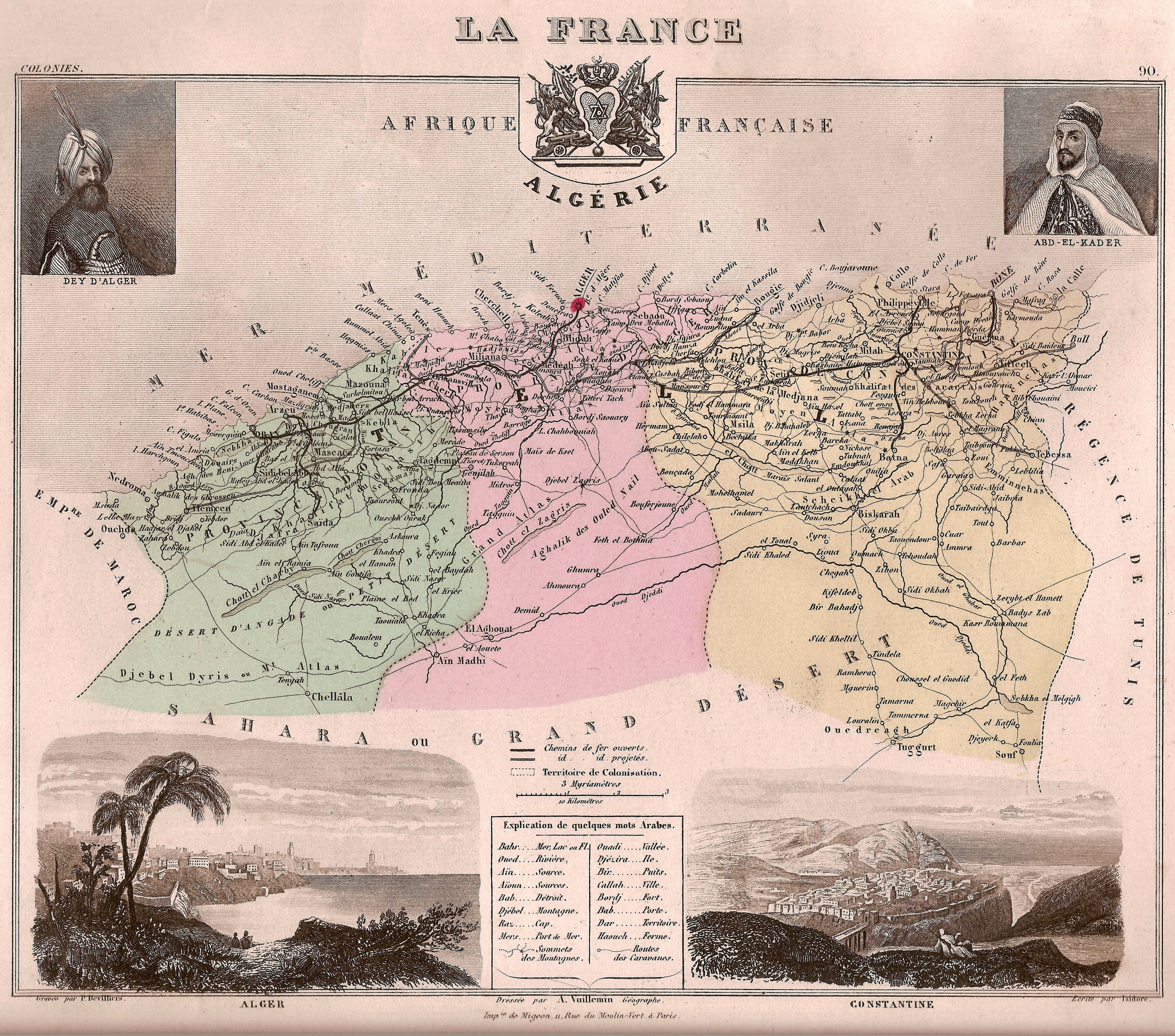
Map of French Algeria

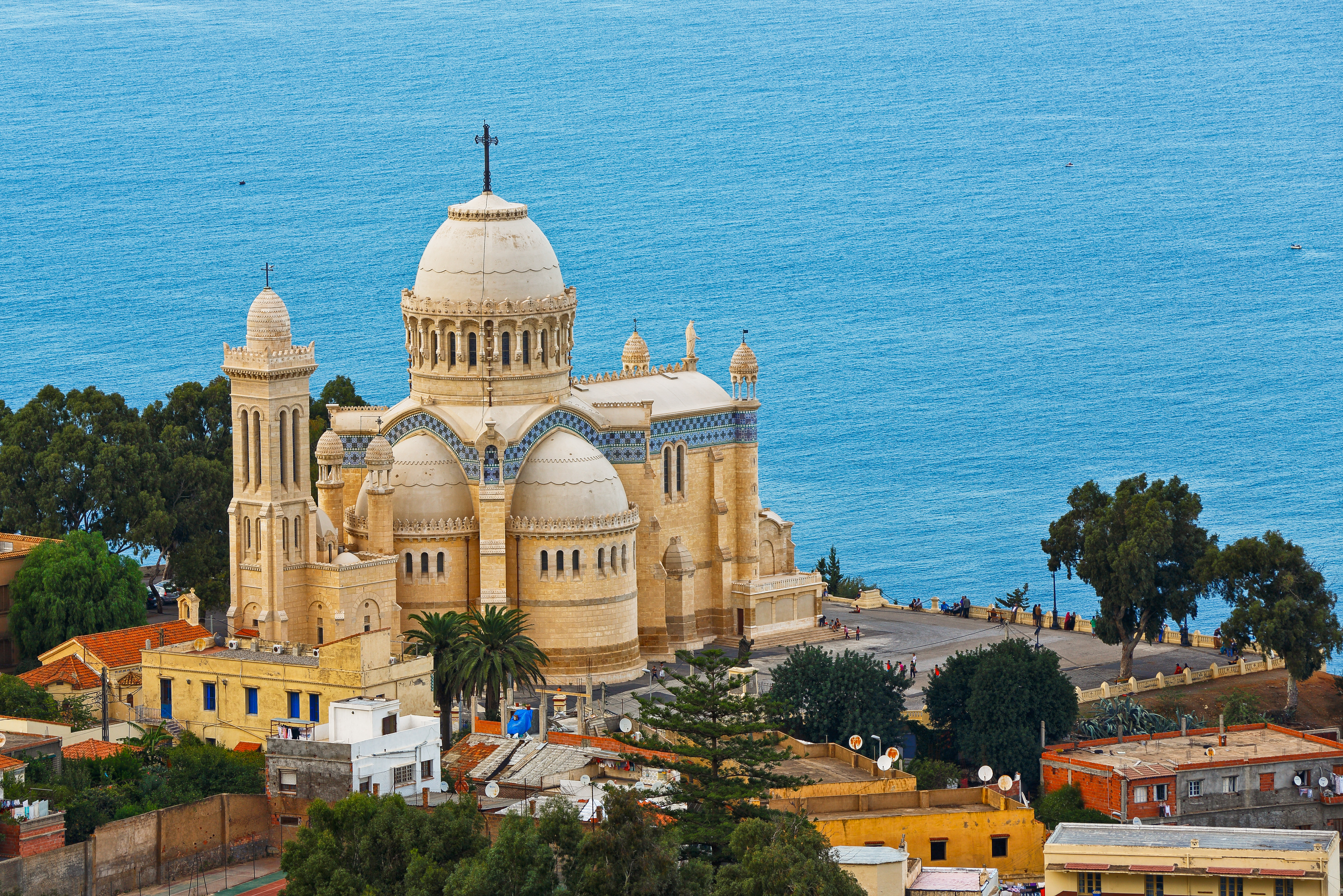
Notre-Dame d'Afrique, a church built by the French pieds-noirs in Algeria

The pied-noir relationship with France and Algeria was marked by alienation. The settlers considered themselves French, but many of the pieds-noirs had a tenuous connection to mainland France; 28 percent of them had never visited there. The settlers encompassed a range of socioeconomic strata, ranging from peasants to large landowners, the latter of whom were referred to as grands colons.

In Algeria, the Muslims were not considered French and did not share the same political or economic benefits of the territory. For example, the indigenous population did not own most of the settlements, farms, or businesses, although they numbered nearly nine million (versus roughly one million pieds-noirs) at independence. Politically, the Muslim Algerians had no representation in the French National Assembly until 1945 and wielded limited influence in local governance. To obtain citizenship, they were required to renounce their Muslim identity – with only about 2,500 Muslims acquiring citizenship before 1930. The settlers' politically and economically dominant position worsened relations between the two groups.

=== The pied-noir population as part of the total Algerian population ===
From roughly the last half of the 19th century until independence, the pieds-noirs accounted for approximately 10% of the total Algerian population. Although they constituted a numerical minority, they were undoubtedly the prime political and economic force of the region.

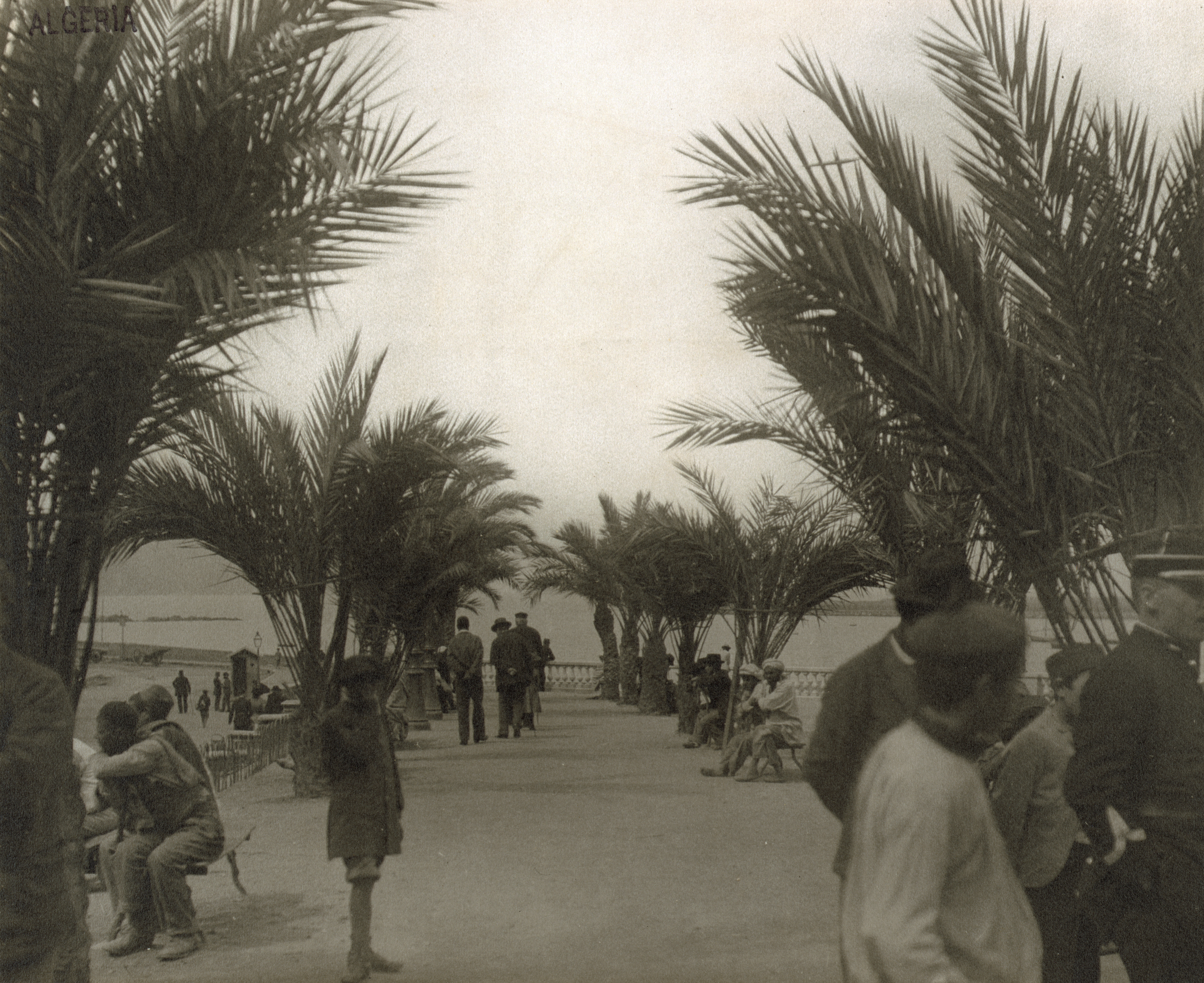
Philippeville Park photographed in 1900 was frequented by mixed European and indigenous Algerian people.

In 1959, the pieds-noirs numbered 1,025,000, and accounted for 10.4% of the total population of Algeria, a percentage gradually diminishing since the peak of 15.2% in 1926. However, some areas of Algeria had high concentrations of pieds-noirs, such as the regions of Bône (now Annaba), Algiers, and above all the area from Oran to Sidi-Bel-Abbès. The population in the Oran metropolitan area was 49.3% European in 1959.

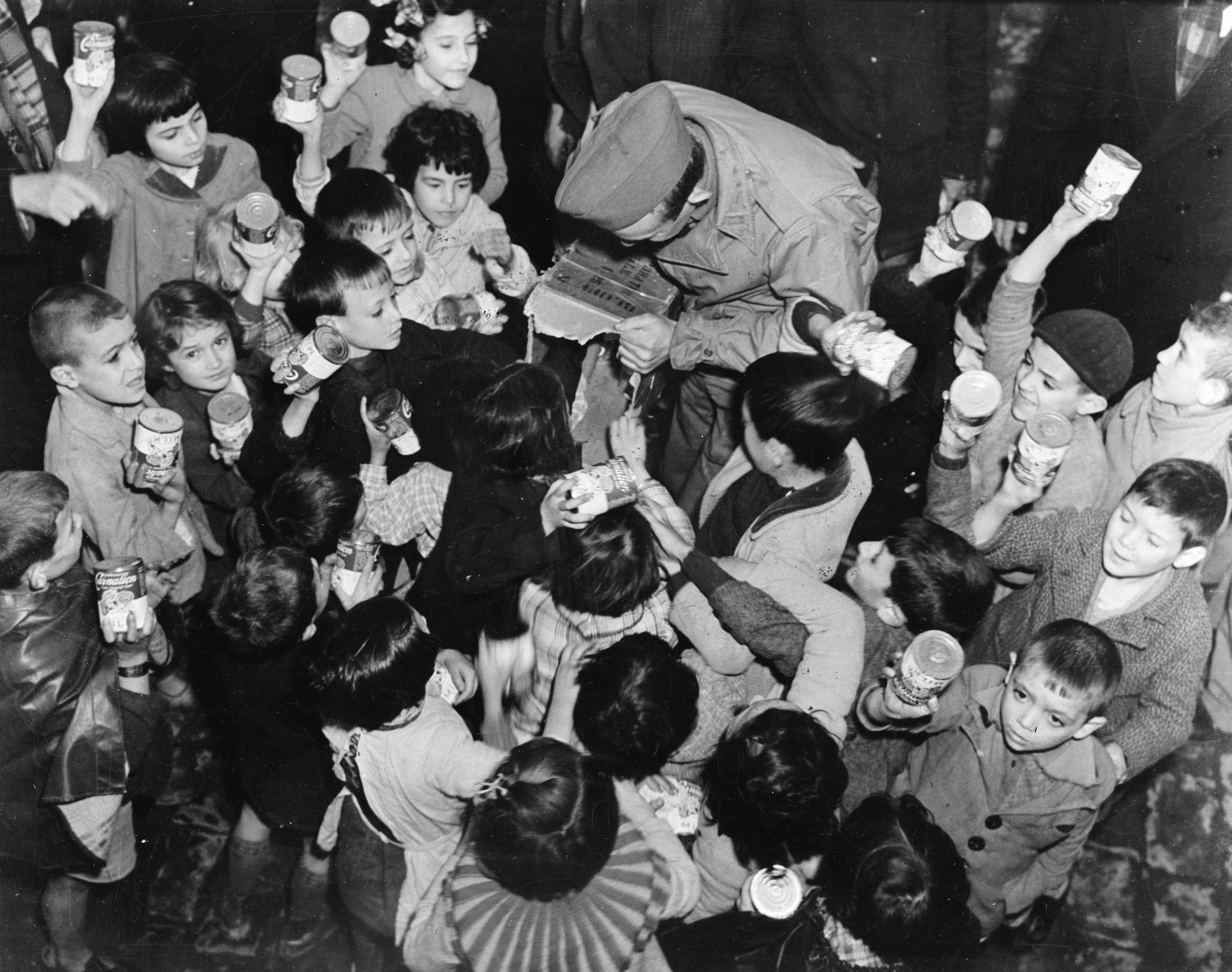
An American sergeant distributing milk to pied-noir children in Oran after Operation Torch in 1942

In the Algiers metropolitan area, Europeans accounted for 35.7% of the population. In the metropolitan area of Bône, they accounted for 40.5% of the population. The département of Oran, a rich European-developed agricultural land of 16,520 km^{2} (6,380 sq mi) stretching between the cities of Oran and Sidi-Bel-Abbès, and including them, was the area of highest pied-noir density outside of the cities, with the pieds-noirs accounting for 33.6% of the population of the département in 1959.

The general Algerian Population and the pied-noir population
Year	Algerian Population	Pied-noir population
1830	1,500,000	14,000 (in 1836)
1851	2,554,100	100,000 (in 1847)
1960	10,853,000	1,111,000 (in 1959)
1965	11,923,000	100,000 (in 1965)

=== Jewish community ===
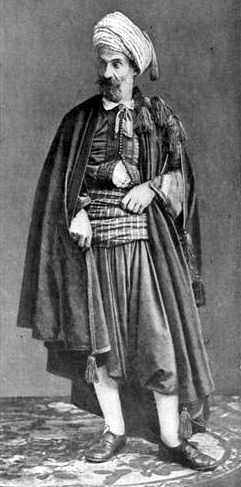
An Algerian Jew, c. late 19th-early 20th century

Jews were present in North Africa and Iberia for centuries, some since the time when "Phoenicians and Hebrews, engaged in maritime commerce, founded Hippo Regius (current Annaba), Tipasa, Caesarea (current Cherchel), and Icosium (current Algiers)". According to oral tradition they arrived from Judea after the First Jewish–Roman War (66–73 AD). It is known historically that many Sephardi Jews came following the Spanish Reconquista. Others came after Spain expelled Jews in 1492.

In 1870, Justice Minister Adolphe Crémieux wrote a proposal, décret Crémieux, to give French citizenship to most Algerian Jews. This advancement was resisted by part of the larger pied-noir community and in 1897 a wave of anti-Semitic riots occurred in Algeria. During World War II the décret Crémieux was abolished under the Vichy regime. Jews were barred from professional jobs between 1940 and 1943. Citizenship was restored in 1943, after the Free French took control over Algeria in the wake of Operation Torch. Thus, the Jews of Algeria eventually came to be considered part of the pied-noir community. Many fled the country to France in 1962, alongside most other pieds-noirs, after the Algerian War.

Mozabite Jews were excluded from the Crémieux Decree, and were only granted “common law civil status” and French citizenship in 1961.

== Algerian War and exodus ==
=== Algerian War ===
For more than a century France maintained colonial rule in Algerian territory. This allowed exceptions to republican law, including Sharia laws applied by Islamic customary courts to Muslim women, which gave women certain rights to property and inheritance that they did not have under French law. Discontent among the Muslim Algerians grew after the World Wars, in which the Algerians sustained many casualties. Algerian nationalists began efforts aimed at furthering equality by listing complaints in the Manifesto of the Algerian People, which requested equal representation under the state and access to citizenship, but no equality for all citizens to preserve Islamic precepts. The French response was to grant citizenship to 60,000 "meritorious" Muslims.

During a reform effort in 1947, the French laws were changed to give the former French subjects with the legal status of "indigenes" full French legal citizenship. The French created an Algerian Assembly, a form of bicameral legislature, with limited powers, and two chambers, one for those who were French citizens before 1947, and another for all the others who had just become French citizens. Given the equal numbers of members in each chamber this meant that one group's votes had seven times more weight than the other group's. Paramilitary groups such as the National Liberation Front (Front de Libération nationale, FLN) appeared, claiming an Arab-Islamic brotherhood and state. This led to the outbreak of a war for independence, the Algerian War, in 1954.

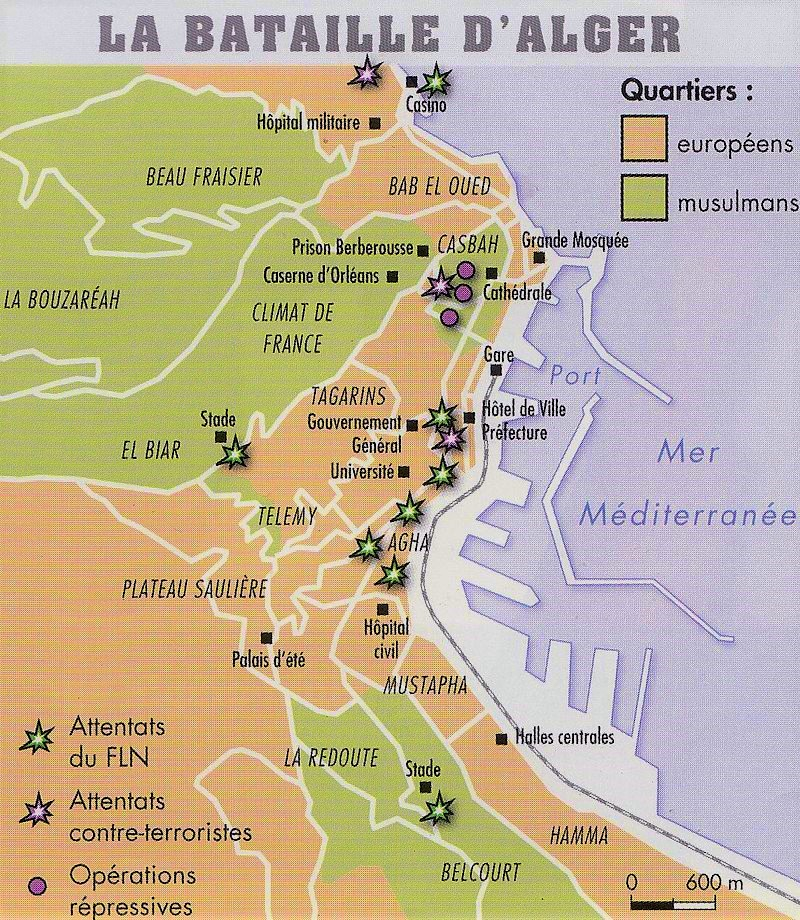
Algiers: Muslim quarters (green), European quarters (brown), FLN attacks

From the first armed operations of November 1954, pied-noir civilians had always been targets for the FLN: they were assassinated in bombings of bars and cinemas; suffered mass massacres; and were tortured and sometimes raped on farms. At the onset of the war, the pieds-noirs believed the French military would be able to overcome opposition. In May 1958 a demonstration for French Algeria, led by pieds-noirs, occupied an Algerian government building. Plots to overthrow the Fourth Republic, some including metropolitan French politicians and generals, had been swirling in Algeria for some time. General Jacques Massu controlled the riot by forming a 'Committee of Public Safety', demanding that his acquaintance Charles de Gaulle be named president of the French Fourth Republic, to prevent the "abandonment of Algeria". This eventually led to the fall of the Republic. In response, the French Parliament voted 329 to 224 to place de Gaulle in power.

Once de Gaulle assumed leadership, he attempted peace by visiting Algeria within three days of his appointment, proclaiming "French Algeria!"; but in September 1959 he planned a referendum for Algerian self-determination that passed overwhelmingly. Many French political and military leaders in Algeria viewed this as a betrayal and formed the Organisation armée secrète (OAS), which had much support among pieds-noirs. This paramilitary group began attacking officials representing de Gaulle's authority, Muslims, and de Gaulle himself. The OAS was also accused of murders and bombings, which nullified any remaining reconciliation opportunities between the communities. The pieds-noirs had never believed such reconciliation possible as their community was targeted from the start.

The opposition culminated in the Algiers putsch of 1961, led by retired generals. After its failure, on 18 March 1962, de Gaulle and the FLN signed a cease-fire agreement, the Évian Accords, and held a referendum. In July, Algerians voted 5,975,581 to 16,534 to become independent from France. On the morning of 5 July 1962, the day Algeria became independent, seven katibas (companies) of the FLN troops entered the city and were fired at by some Europeans. An outraged Arab mob swept to pied-noir neighborhoods, which had already been largely vacated, and attacked the remaining pieds-noirs. The violence lasted several hours and was ended by the deployment of the French Gendarmerie.

==== Exodus ====
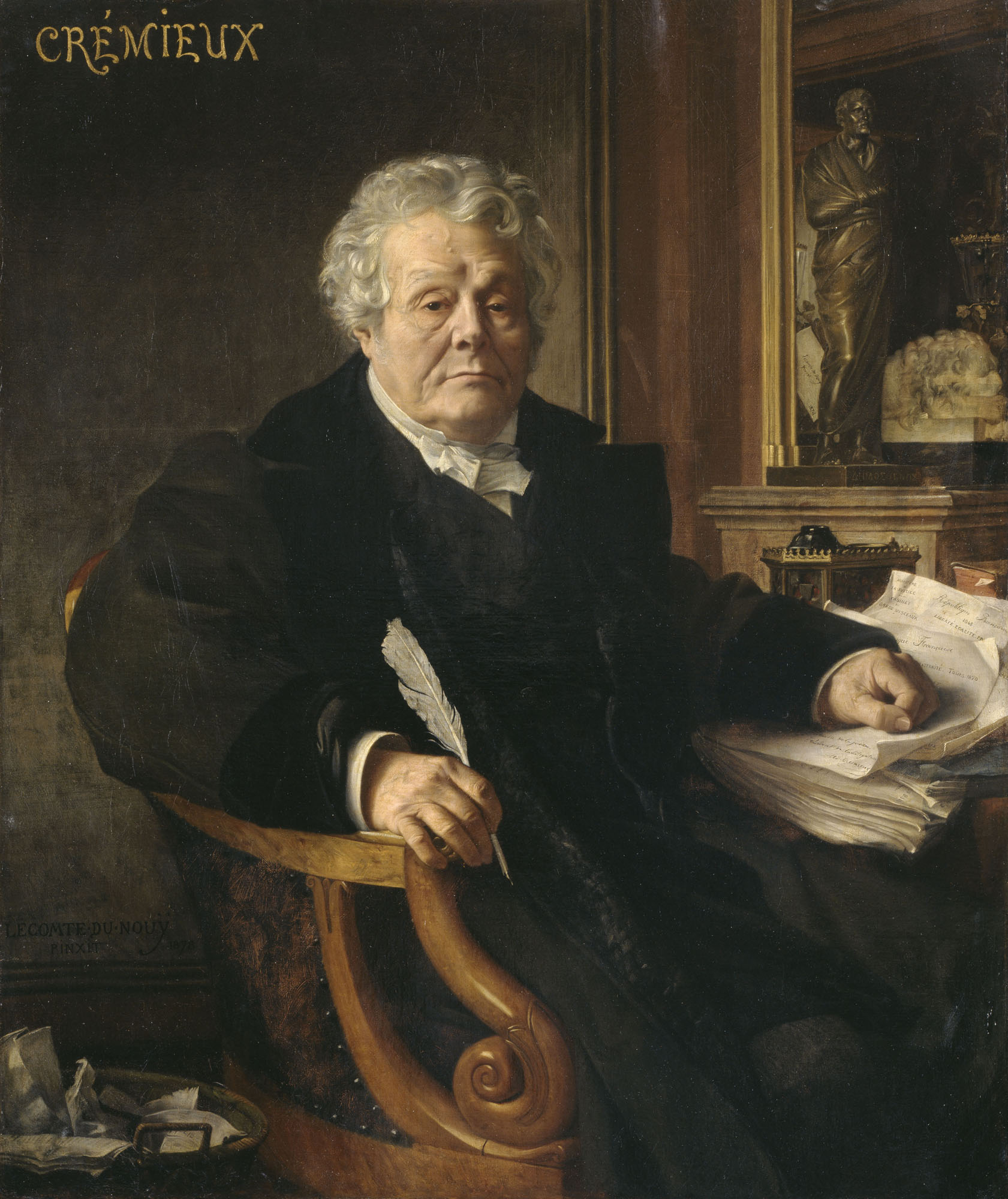
Minister of Justice Adolphe Crémieux's decrees of October 24, 1870 granted automatic French citizenship to French Algeria's Sephardic Jews. In contrast, Muslims and 3-year resident European foreigners had to have reached the age of majority (21) to apply.

The exodus began once it became clear that Algeria would become independent. In Algiers, it was reported that by May 1961 the morale had sunk among the pieds-noirs because of violence and allegations that the entire community of French nationals had been responsible for "terrorism, torture, colonial racism, and ongoing violence in general" and because the group felt "rejected by the nation as pieds-noirs". These factors, the Oran Massacre, and the referendum for independence caused the pied-noir exodus to begin in earnest.

The number of pieds-noirs who fled Algeria totalled more than 800,000 between 1962 and 1964. Many pieds-noirs left only with what they could carry in a suitcase. Adding to the confusion, the de Gaulle government ordered the French Navy not to help with transportation of French citizens. By September 1962, cities such as Oran, Bône, and Sidi Bel Abbès were half-empty. All administration-, police-, school-, justice-, and commercial activities stopped within three months after many pieds-noirs were told to choose either "la valise ou le cercueil" (the suitcase or the coffin). Some 200,000 pieds-noirs chose to remain, but they gradually left through the following decades; by the 1980s only a few thousand pieds-noirs remained in Algeria.

Along with the exodus of the pieds-noirs, the Muslim harki auxiliaries, who had fought on the French side during the Algerian War, also tried to emigrate. But of approximately 250,000 Muslim loyalists only about 90,000, including dependents, were able to escape to France. Of those who remained, many thousands were killed by lynch mobs or executed as traitors by the FLN. In contrast to the treatment of the European pieds-noirs, little effort was made by the French government to extend protection to the harkis or to arrange their organised evacuation.

==== Flight to mainland France ====
The Government of France claimed that it had not anticipated that such a massive number would leave; it believed that perhaps 300,000 might choose to depart temporarily and that a large portion would return to Algeria. The administration had set aside funds for absorption of those it called repatriates to partly reimburse them for property losses. The administration avoided acknowledging the true numbers of refugees to avoid upsetting its Algeria policies. Consequently, few plans were made for their return, and, psychologically at least, many of the pieds-noirs were alienated from both Algeria and France.

Most pieds-noirs settled in continental France, with a large number moving to regions in the South of France such as Provence-Alpes-Côte d'Azur and Languedoc-Roussillon which offered a similar climate to Algeria. Other pied-noirs who felt politically betrayed by the French government chose to settle in Spain, then ruled by Franco, with a significant section of the pied-noir population from Oran forming an enclave in the Alicante region. Others also migrated to the French overseas territory of New Caledonia, while smaller numbers of pied-noirs also settled in Australia, Israel, Argentina, Italy, the United States and Canada. The influx of new citizens bolstered the local economies; however, the newcomers also competed for jobs, which caused resentment. One unintended consequence, with significant and ongoing political effects, was the resentment caused by the state resettlement programme for pieds-noirs in rural Corsica, which triggered a cultural and political nationalist movement.

In some ways, the pieds-noirs were able to integrate well into the French community, in particular relative to their harki Muslim counterparts. Their resettlement was made easier by the economic boom of the 1960s. However, the ease of assimilation depended on socioeconomic class.

Integration was easier for the upper classes, many of whom found the transformation less stressful than the lower classes, whose only capital had been left in Algeria when they fled. Many were surprised at often being treated as an "underclass or outsider-group" with difficulties in gaining advancement in their careers. Also, many pieds-noirs contended that the money allocated by the government to assist in relocation and reimbursement was insufficient regarding their losses.

Thus, the repatriated pieds-noirs frequently felt "disaffected" from French society. They also suffered from a sense of alienation stemming from the French government's changed position towards Algeria. Until independence, Algeria was legally a part of France; after independence many felt that they had been betrayed and were now portrayed as an "embarrassment" to their country or to blame for the war. Most pieds-noirs felt a powerful sense of loss and a longing for their lost homeland in Algeria. The American author Claire Messud remembered seeing her pied-noir father, a lapsed Catholic, crying while watching Pope John Paul II deliver a Mass on his TV. When asked why, Messud père replied: "Because when I last heard the mass in Latin, I thought I had a religion, and I thought I had a country." Messud noted that the novelist Albert Camus, himself a pied-noir, had often written of his love for the sea-shores and mountains of Algeria, declaring Algeria was a place that was a part of his soul, feelings she noted mirrored those of other pieds-noirs for whom Algeria was the only home they had ever known.

==== Pieds-noirs who remained ====
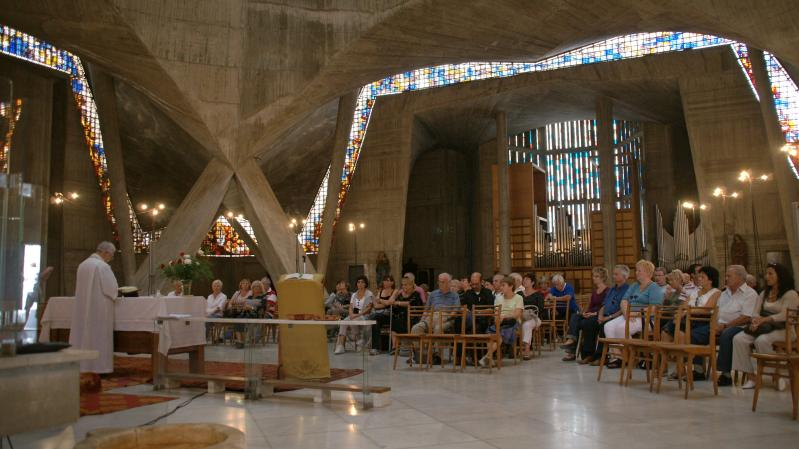
Catholic mass at Sacred Heart Cathedral of Algiers, 2009

In the aftermath of the war, some pieds-noirs chose to remain in Algeria; their population was recorded at standing around 200,000 in October 1962. By 1965 their population had dropped to around 50,000.

Under the Algerian Nationality Code of 1963, pieds-noirs were permitted to obtain Algerian citizenship, but political reluctance by the FLN and the slowness of the process prompted some pieds-noirs to emigrate over choosing citizenship. In 1965, it was believed more than 500 ethnic European persons had applied for Algerian citizenship, with 200 having been born in Algeria. During the 1980s, social affairs counselors at the French embassy in Algiers encouraged elderly pied-noirs living alone to migrate to mainland France in order to rejoin their relatives.

In recent decades, it has been harder to determine the total population of pied-noir heritage in Algeria due to inconsistent data. In 1979, Le Monde journalist Daniel Junqua put the population as being around 3,000. In 1993, French historian Hélène Bracco claimed the population to be higher at around 30,000 but noted most were elderly. Lingering political instability and events such as the Algerian civil war prompted many remaining Algerians of European descent to leave the country and apply for citizenship of France. In 2008, the French Consulate in Algiers recorded that around 300 persons of European descent remain in the country, whereas an Algerian census company recorded the number as higher. The Association of French People Abroad (ADFE) based in Oran claimed that the total number stood around 4,500 in 2008. French journalist Pierre Daum documented that small communities of pied-noirs who have acquired Algerian citizenship remain in large cities such as Algiers and have integrated themselves into Algerian society.

=== Legacy ===
In 2016, a group of pied-noir activists headed by Jacques Villard set up the Gouvernement provisoire Pied-Noir en exil (lit. 'Provisional Government of the Pied-Noir in exile') in Montpellier in response to what they argued has been marginalization against the pied-noir community by successive governments in France. The movement has been referred to as État pied-noir. Since 2022, some of its members call for the establishment of an autonomous pied-noir national territory in the French mainland.

Some Pieds-Noir have expressed a sentiment of "nostalgérie," a feeling of nostalgia for French Algeria.

The 2021 comic book Non-retour is about a group of pieds-noirs who are forced to leave Algeria in July 1962. It was inspired by the childhood memories of its scenarist Jean-Laurent Truc.

== Flags ==
Flag proposed by Jean-Paul Gavino

Tricolore flag with two black feet

Flag of the USDIFRA using pied-noir symbolism

État pied-noir flag to the claim sovereignty and nationhood

== The Song of the Africans ==
The pied-noir community has adopted, as both an unofficial anthem and as a symbol of its identity, Captain Félix Boyer's 1943 version of "Le Chant des Africains" (lit. 'The Song of the Africans'). This was a 1915 Infanterie de Marine marching song, originally titled "C'est nous les Marocains" (lit. 'We are the Moroccans') and dedicated to Colonel Van Hecke, commander of a World War I cavalry unit: the 7e régiment de chasseurs d'Afrique ("7th African Light Cavalry Regiment"). Boyer's song was adopted during World War II by the Free French First Army that was drawn from units of the Army of Africa and included many pieds-noirs. The music and words were later used by the pieds-noirs to proclaim their allegiance to France.

The "Song of the Africans" was banned from use as official military music in 1962 at the end of the Algerian War until August 1969. The French Minister of Veterans Affairs (Ministre des Anciens Combattants) at the time, Henri Duvillard, lifted the prohibition.

== Notable pieds-noirs ==
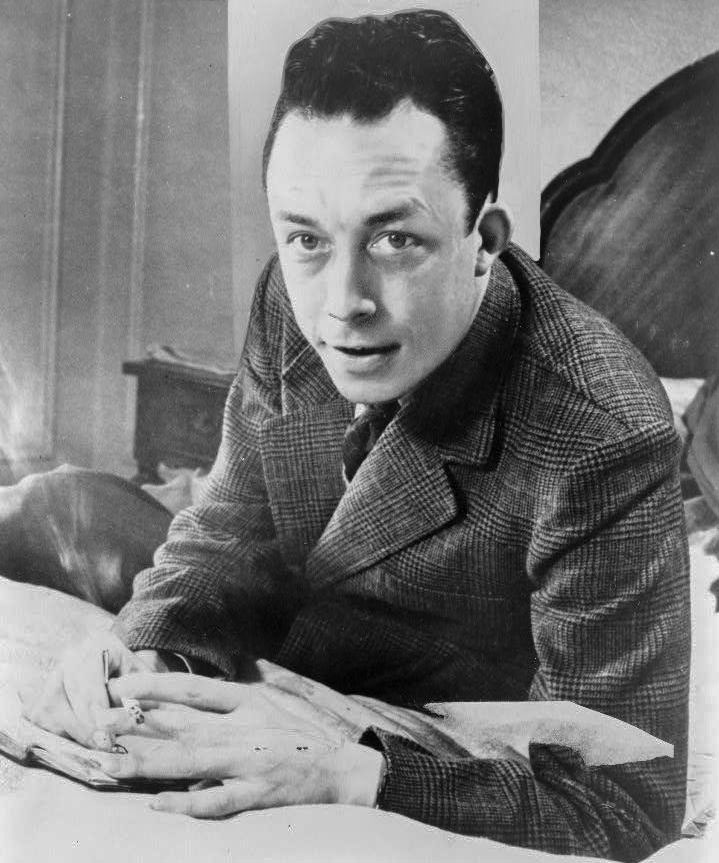
Albert Camus in 1957

- Louis Althusser, philosopher
- Jacques Attali, economist, writer
- Jean-Marc Aveline, Archbishop of Marseille
- Paul Belmondo, sculptor, father of the actor Jean-Paul Belmondo
- Patrick Bokanowski, filmmaker
- Patrick Bruel, singer
- Albert Camus, Nobel Prize-winning author and philosopher
- Marcel Cerdan, boxer
- Pierre Chaulet, FLN militant and doctor
- Claude Cohen-Tannoudji, Nobel laureate
- Étienne Daho, singer
- Jacques Derrida, philosopher
- Annie Fratellini, circus clown
- Tony Gatlif, filmmaker
- Joséphine Jobert, actress and singer
- Marlène Jobert, actress and author
- Alphonse Juin, Marshal of France
- Jean-François Larios, footballer
- Bernard-Henri Lévy, philosopher and public intellectual
- Enrico Macias, singer
- Jean Pélégri, author
- Emmanuel Roblès, author
- Yves Saint Laurent, fashion designer
- Martial Solal, jazz pianist
- Alexandre Villaplane, footballer and Nazi collaborator

== See also ==
- White Zimbabweans
- Caldoche
- Arab-Berber
- Kouloughlis
- European Moroccans
- European Tunisians
- Italian Tunisians
- Turco-Tunisians
- Italian Algerians
- Italian settlers in Libya
- French people
- White Africans of European ancestry
- White people in the Democratic Republic of the Congo
- Retornados
- List of French possessions and colonies
- Settler colonialism

== Sources ==
- Horne, Alistair. (1977). A Savage War of Peace: Algeria, 1954-1962. Viking Press.
- McDougall, James. (2017). A History of Algeria. Cambridge University Press.
- McDougall, James. (2006). History and the culture of nationalism in Algeria. Cambridge University Press.
- Ramsay, R. (1983) The Corsican Time-Bomb, Manchester University Press: Manchester. ISBN 0-7190-0893-X.
