= Senard =

Senard is a surname. Notable people with the surname include:

- Antoine Sénard (1800–1885), French lawyer and politician
- Antoine Senard (runner) (born 2000), French middle-distance and cross country runner
- Jacques Senard (1919–2020), French diplomat
- Jean-Dominique Senard (born 1953), French industrialist
