= James McDougall (academic) =

British historian and actor (born 1974)

Professor James McDougall FRHistS
- Born: James Robert McDougall; 1974 (age 51–52)
- Other name: Jack Davidson
- Occupations: Historian and academic
- Title: Professor of Modern and Contemporary History

Academic background
- Education: University of St Andrews; St Antony's College, Oxford; Arts Educational Schools
- Thesis: Colonial words: nationalism, Islam, and languages of history in Algeria (2002)

Academic work
- Discipline: History
- Sub-discipline: Contemporary history; History of North Africa; History of Islam; History of Algeria; French colonial empire
- Institutions: St Antony's College, Oxford; Princeton University; SOAS University of London; Trinity College, Oxford
- Notable works: History and the Culture of Nationalism in Algeria; A History of Algeria

James Robert McDougall FRHistS, also known as Jack Davidson (born 1974), is a British historian and actor. Until 2025, he was a Professor of Modern and Contemporary History at the University of Oxford and Laithwaite Fellow in History at Trinity College, Oxford.

== Career ==
=== Academia ===
McDougall attended a comprehensive school in County Durham. He studied French, German, and Arabic at the University of St Andrews, then modern Middle Eastern history and politics at St Antony's College, Oxford. He was a junior research fellow at the Middle East Centre of St Antony's College, Oxford (2002–2004), then assistant professor of history at Princeton University (2004–2007) and lecturer in the history of Africa at the School of Oriental and African Studies, University of London (2007–2009), before taking up a tutorial fellowship in modern history at Trinity College, Oxford, in 2009. He was awarded a professorial title in 2018. McDougall became an emeritus fellow of Trinity College in 2026, and remains active in research and graduate supervision as an associate member of the Faculty of History.

McDougall's research focuses on the history of North Africa and the French colonial empire.

In 2015, he supported an academic boycott of Israeli higher education institutions.

McDougall has written for The Guardian and Times Higher Education. In 2018, McDougall was involved in academic disagreement in Oxford with Nigel Biggar's controversial "Ethics and Empire" project.

=== Acting ===
McDougall left his academic position at Oxford in 2025 to complete an MA in acting at the Arts Educational Schools in Chiswick. He acts under the stage name Jack Davidson.

== Selected works ==
- Nation, society and culture in North Africa (Routledge, 2003)
- History and the culture of nationalism in Algeria (Cambridge University Press, 2006)
- Saharan frontiers: Space and mobility in northwest Africa with Judith Scheele (Indiana University Press, 2012)
- Global and local in Algeria and Morocco: The world, the state, and the village with Robert P. Parks (Routledge, 2015)
- A History of Algeria (Cambridge University Press, 2017)
- Worlds of Islam: A Global History (Basic Books, 2026)
