= A History of Algeria =

2017 book by James McDougall

- Author: James McDougall
- Language: English
- Subject: History of Algeria
- Genre: Non-fiction, history
- Publisher: Cambridge University Press
- Publication date: 2017
- Pages: 448
- ISBN: 978-0521851640
- Website: Publisher page

A History of Algeria is a book by James McDougall and published in 2017 by Cambridge University Press. The work is an overview of the history of Algeria from the sixteenth century until 2016.

== Structure ==
The work contains normal front material, including maps, followed by an introduction by the author, and seven main chapters:

1. Ecologies, Societies, Cultures and the State, 1516–1830
2. Conquest, Resistance and Accommodation, 1830–1911
3. The Means of Domination, 1830–1944
4. The Politics of Loyalty and Dissent, 1912–1942
5. Revolution and Civil War, 1942–1962
6. The Unfinished Revolution, 1962–1992
7. The Fragile and Resilient Country, 1992–2012

The work concludes with an afterword and bibliography.

== Academic journal reviews ==
- Cooper, Austin R. (2019). "Reviewed work: A HISTORY OF ALGERIA, James McDougall". The Arab Studies Journal. 27 (2): 146–150. JSTOR 27097967.
- Ghilès, Francis (2017). "Argelia: El «polvo humano» ha resultado ser extraordinariamente resiliente". Revista Cidob d'Afers Internacionals (116): 248–250. doi:10.24241/rcai.2017.116.2.248. JSTOR 26379152.
- Meynier, Gilbert; McDougall, James (2018). "Reviewed work: A History of Algeria, McDougallJames". Vingtième Siècle. Revue d'Histoire (138): 217–218. JSTOR 26541545.
- Perkins, Kenneth; McDougall, James (2018). "Reviewed work: A History of Algeria, McdougallJames". Review of Middle East Studies. 52 (1): 216–218. doi:10.1017/rms.2018.45. JSTOR 26478515. S2CID 187723320.
- Spencer, Claire (2017). "Algeria's past reclaimed". The World Today. 73 (4): 48–49. JSTOR 45180931.

== Publication history ==
- Original paperback edition: 2017, Cambridge University Press.
- eBook edition: 2017, Cambridge University Press.

== About the author ==
James Robert McDougall FRHistS, also known as Jack Davidson (born 1974), is a British historian and actor. Until 2025, he was a Professor of Modern and Contemporary History at the University of Oxford and Laithwaite Fellow in History at Trinity College, Oxford.

== Similar or related works ==
- A Savage War of Peace: Algeria, 1954-1962 by Alistair Horne
- History and the culture of nationalism in Algeria by James McDougall

== See also ==
- History of Algeria (1962–99)
- History of French foreign relations
