= 1988 October Riots =

Anti Government Riots in Algeria

- Part of the history of Algeria (1962–1999)
- Date: 5–10 October 1988
- Location: Algeria
- Caused by: Increase in oil prices; Unemployment; Government unpopularity
- Methods: Riots
- Result: End of the one-party system

Casualties
- Deaths: 500
- Arrested: 15,000

The 1988 October Riots were a series of street-level disturbances and riotous demonstrations by Algerian youth, which started on 5 October 1988 and ended on the 11th. The riots were "the most serious" since Algeria's independence", and involved thousands of youth who "took control of the streets". Riots started in Algiers and spread to other cities, resulting in about 500 deaths and 1000 wounded although the official death count reports that 159 were killed with 154 protesters injured.

The riots indirectly led to the fall of the country's one-party system (Front de Libération Nationale (FLN) party had been in power since 1962) and the introduction of democratic reform, but also to a spiral of instability and increasingly vicious political conflict, ultimately fostering the Algerian Civil War.

== Background ==
There are two dominant narratives surrounding the reasons for the October 1988 riots:

The first, and most prominent argument among Western journalists is that the riots stemmed from recent economic troubles in Algeria. The rising prices, the high rate of unemployment among youth, and austerity measures announced by the government fed the desire to express their discontent. Between 1985 and 1987, the unemployment rate increased rapidly from 658,000 to 1,200,000 while the unemployment rate was anticipated to reach 31.7% of the population by the year 2000.

Coupled with the demographic changes due to the high fertility rate since Algeria's independence, there was a significant subsection of the population between the ages of 0-14, accounting for 44.35% of the population in 1988. In light of the continuous reduction in fuel prices, a significant source of income for the country, it is evident how the link between an economic downturn and the outburst of protests is formed. With no evident sign of economic progress in sight, the youth, most of them from low-income neighborhoods, took to the streets to advocate for their basic human right—an equal chance to succeed in life. However, this analysis falls short in light of the "lack of economic grievances" from the rioters. There were no official declarations made concerning their economic objectives. Despite President Chadli's speech on 10 October in which he announced the government's plan to proceed with the widely unpopular austerity measures, and price reductions for necessities, the riots came to a halt that evening.

The second argument is a deep political contempt for President Chadli Bendjedid and the FLN government. Rioters were recorded saying "we don't want butter or pepper, we want a leader we can respect". The use of the words butter and pepper, which are two staple products highlights the flaws of the economic determinism argument. Despite their economic hardships, the rioters were pushing for honest leaders, rather than economic reforms. Similarly, the lawyers who supported the young men argued that the riots were a result of the lack of formal avenues to freely and peacefully express their frustrations.

== Events ==
The targets of the anarchic protests included shops, offices, official vehicles, and buildings – which were set on fire – Air Algérie agencies, buses, road signs and other symbols of the state, any automobile that looked expensive, and the expensive Riad al Fath shopping mall on the heights overlooking the capital.

The police and the civil administration were put under military control and torture of detainees at the police academy was reported. The state of emergency was decreed on 6 October and a curfew was established that ran from midnight to six o'clock in the morning (starting on 8 October the curfew was not enforced until 8 o'clock at night). Police were taunted as "Jews" by the demonstrators, a comment on the intifada in Israel.

On 9 October, an anonymous tract was distributed to the youth which called for a march the next day. This march, under the leadership of imam Ali Benhadj led to violent repressions resulting in the deaths of 30 protesters. Torture was also used as a means of discouraging protesters, including sodomy, mutilation, and electrocution.

In general, the riots were directed at the increasing social despair – to a large extent, the result of oil prices dropping sharply the preceding years – and at the slow pace of economic and political reform. The protests were violently repressed, but set in motion a process of internal power struggles and public criticism.

== Aftermath ==
Following the riots, the Bendjedid government promised political reforms with a "greater democratisation of political action" and "political and institutional changes". On 13 October, President Chadli announced that the 1976 Constitution would be revised through a referendum on 3 November. This referendum had a participation rate of 83.1% with 92.27% of the voters in favor of its revision. The Constitution of 1989 was submitted to a referendum on 23 February 1989, ushering in what some believe was a new chapter of Algerian history.

In comparison to the previous constitution, the 1989 constitution demonstrated the new direction of the Algerian government. The reference to socialism is not found in the new constitution and the recognition of freedom of the individual replaces the recognition of the freedom of the people found in the previous constitution. In Article 1, Algeria is referred to as a "socialist state" while the 1989 constitution asserts that it is a "democratic and people's republic". Similarly, Chapter 2 which dedicated fifteen articles to explaining the government's commitment to socialism is completely removed. The transition from socialism to democracy is often interpreted as a new openness to pluralism. This analysis is supported by the introduction of Article 42 which states all citizens have the "right to create associations with a political character".

This article gives credibility to opposing political parties such as the Parti d'Avant-Garde Socialistes (PAGS) and the Front Islamique du Salut (FIS) to emerge on the scene. Nevertheless, according to Aït-Aoudia, this puts these political reforms into question by interrogating the possibility of truly reforming a one-party state into a democracy. She argues that by making the FLN party the apparatus of the state, there is a lack of precedent on how to create a democratic system where multiple political parties can occupy various positions peacefully. The constitution of 1989 gives a new role to the army relegating it to defending the national independence of Algeria.The new constitution puts an emphasis on religion in its preamble, stating that Algeria is a "land of Islam".

== See also ==
- History of Algeria (1962–1999)
