= Ahmed Boumendjel =

Algerian politician and nationalist

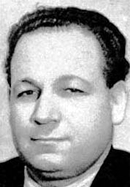
Ahmed Boumendjel

Ahmed Boumendjel (born on 22 April 1908 in Beni Yenni, Tizi Ouzou Province and died on 19 November 1982) was an Algerian politician and nationalist.

== Early life ==
He was born in 1908 in Taourirt n'Mangllat (Ain El Hammam) Grande Kabylie. He first worked as a teacher then resumed his studies, got a law degree and practiced the profession of lawyer.

He worked alongside Ferhat Abbas during the Second World War within the party Friends of the Manifesto of Liberty and then to the Democratic Union for the Algerian Manifesto. Elected to Board of the French Union, Boumendjel had to leave Algeria to settle in France.

== Algerian Revolution ==
He became a member of the Federation of France's National Liberation Front from 1957, then member of the National Council of the Algerian Revolution from 1957 to 1962 He then went to Tunisia where he led the newspaper El Moudjahid which appeared in the French language. He is the author of the article known as "The information poisoned", which was a source of controversy between the Tunisian Government and the Provisional Government of the Algerian Republic. It represented the Provisional Government along with Mohamed Seddik Benyahia in Melun talks at June 1960 and participated in the first negotiations in Evian. During the internal crisis that occurred after independence, Boumendjel rallied with Ferhat Abbas to form the Ben Bella group. He was appointed Minister of Public Works in September 1962 to 1963.
