= History and the Culture of Nationalism in Algeria =

2006 book by James McDougall

- Author: James McDougall
- Language: English
- Subject: History of Algeria
- Genre: Non-fiction, history
- Publisher: Cambridge University Press
- Publication date: 2006
- Pages: 284 (Hardback, illustrated edition)
- ISBN: 978-0521843737
- Website: Cambridge University Press

History and the Culture of Nationalism in Algeria is a book by James McDougall published originally by Cambridge University Press in 2006. It is part of the Cambridge Middle East Studies Series (Number 24). The book is an analysis of how the Algerian nationalist narrative was created and developed in popular memory. The author pays particular attention to the role the Association of Muslim Scholars and Ahmad Tawfiq al-Madani played in the development of the nationalist narrative.

== Structure ==
The work contains normal front material, a preface, an essay titled The Language of History, and a prologue centered on Tunis in 1899. This is followed by five main essays:

1. The margins of a world in fragments
2. The conquest conquered?
3. The doctors of new religion
4. Saint cults and ancestors
5. Arabs and Berbers?

It concludes with an epilogue centered on Algiers in 2001, an essay entitled The invention of authenticity, and a bibliography.

== Academic journal reviews ==
- Branche, Raphaëlle (2007). "Reviewed work: History and the Culture of Nationalism in Algeria". Vingtième Siècle. Revue d'Histoire (93): 245–246. JSTOR 4619271.
- Choueiri, Youssef (2008). "Discourses of Algerian Nationalism". The Journal of African History. 49 (2): 338–339. doi:10.1017/S0021853708003897. JSTOR 40206664. S2CID 162412237.
- Christelow, Allan (2007). "Reviewed work: History and the Culture of Nationalism in Algeria, James McDougall". The American Historical Review. 112 (2): 624–625. JSTOR 4136787.
- Henry, Clement M. (2007). "Reviewed work: History and the Culture of Nationalism in Algeria, James McDougall". Middle East Journal. 61 (1): 151–152. JSTOR 4330362.
- Naylor, Phillip C. (2008). "Reviewed work: History and the Culture of Nationalism in Algeria, James McDougall". International Journal of Middle East Studies. 40 (2): 329–332. doi:10.1017/S0020743808080653. JSTOR 30069624. S2CID 161425552.
- Rahal, Malika (2008). "Reviewed work: History and the Culture of Nationalism in Algeria, James McDougall". Annales. Histoire, Sciences Sociales. 63 (3): 710–712. doi:10.1017/S0395264900023714. JSTOR 40376703. S2CID 164968538.
- Webb, Edward (2007). "Reviewed work: History and the Culture of Nationalism in Algeria, JAMES MCDOUGALL". Middle East Studies Association Bulletin. 41 (2): 208–209. doi:10.1017/S0026318400050793. JSTOR 23063340. S2CID 164702918.
- Wien, Peter (2008). "Reviewed work: History and the Culture of Nationalism in Algeria, James McDougall". Social History. 33 (3): 340–342. JSTOR 25594265.

== Publication history ==
- Original edition: 2006, Cambridge University Press.

== About the author ==
James Robert McDougall FRHistS, also known as Jack Davidson (born 1974), is a British historian and actor. Until 2025, he was a Professor of Modern and Contemporary History at the University of Oxford and Laithwaite Fellow in History at Trinity College, Oxford.

== Similar or related works ==
- A Savage War of Peace: Algeria, 1954-1962 by Alistair Horne
- A History of Algeria by James McDougall

== See also ==
- History of Algeria (1962–99)
- History of French foreign relations
