= A Savage War of Peace: Algeria, 1954–1962 =

1977 book by Alistair Horne

- Author: Alistair Horne
- Audio read by: James Adams
- Language: English
- Subject: History of Algeria
- Genre: Non-fiction, history
- Publisher: Macmillan, Viking Press and New York Review Books
- Publication date: 1977 (first edition)
- Pages: 604
- ISBN: 978-0670619641
- Website: Penguin RandomHouse page, New York Review Books page

A Savage War of Peace: Algeria, 1954–1962 is a book by Alistair Horne, first published in 1977 by Macmillan in the UK and by Viking Press in the USA. The book covers the background, events and aftermath of the Algerian War (1954–1962). It was awarded the Wolfson Prize in 1978.

== Structure ==
The book begins with an introductory section of 3 chapters, "Prelude 1830-1954"; followed by two substantial parts, "The War 1954–1958" and "The Hardest of All Victories 1958-1962", which comprise a further 22 chapters. Later editions contain an updated preface by the author.

== Academic journal reviews ==
- Cooke, James J. (1979). "Reviewed work: A Savage War of Peace: Algeria, 1954-1962, Alistair Horne". The American Historical Review. 84 (1): 226. doi:10.2307/1855820. JSTOR 1855820.
- Shamsuddin, Farrid (2009). "Reviewed work: A Savage War of Peace: Algeria 1954–1962, Alistair Horne". Journal of Peace Research. 46 (3): 456. doi:10.1177/00223433090460030908. JSTOR 25654422. S2CID 109154048.
- Manrique, Luis Esteban G. (2007). "Irak a través del prisma de la guerra de Argelia". Política Exterior. 21 (117): 199–203. JSTOR 20646078.
- Williams, Ann (1978). "Reviewed work: A Savage War of Peace: Algeria 1954-1962., Alistair Horne". International Affairs. 54 (3): 522–524. doi:10.2307/2616204. JSTOR 2616204.
- Sigwalt, Richard (1979). "Reviewed work: A Savage War of Peace: Algeria 1954–1962, Alistair Horne". The Annals of the American Academy of Political and Social Science. 441: 199. doi:10.1177/000271627944100116. JSTOR 1043304. S2CID 144679049.
- Shorrock, William I. (1979). "Reviewed work: A Savage War of Peace: Algeria, 1954-1962, Alistair Horne". The Historian. 41 (4): 783–784. JSTOR 24443559.
- "Reviewed work: A Savage War of Peace: Algeria 1954–1962, Alistair Horne". The Wilson Quarterly. 2 (3): 159–160. 1978. JSTOR 40255476.
- Busi, Frederick (1979). "Reviewed work: A Savage War of Peace: Algeria 1954–1962, Alistair Horne". The French Review. 52 (6): 944–945. JSTOR 391811.
- Perkins, Kenneth J. (1979). "Reviewed work: A Savage War of Peace: Algeria, 1954-1962, Alistair Horne". The International Journal of African Historical Studies. 12 (4): 708–710. doi:10.2307/218090. JSTOR 218090.
- Ageron, Charles-Robert (1980). "Reviewed work: A savage War of Peace. Algeria, 1954–1962, Alistair Horne". Revue Historique. 2 (536): 495–496. JSTOR 40953493.
- Albrecht-Carrié, René (1978). "Reviewed work: A Savage War of Peace: Algeria 1954-1962., Alistair Horne". Political Science Quarterly. 93 (3): 542–543. doi:10.2307/2149571. JSTOR 2149571.

== Publishing history ==
- Original hardback edition: 1977, Viking Press.
- Paperback edition: 2006, NYRB Classics.
- Audiobook edition: 2008, Blackstone Audio.
- Kindle ebook edition: 2011, NYRB Classics.

== See also ==
- History and the culture of nationalism in Algeria (Cambridge Middle East Studies, Series No. 24) by James McDougall
- A History of Algeria by James McDougall
- History of Algeria (1962–99)
- History of French foreign relations
