= Jacques Senard =

French diplomat (1919–2020)

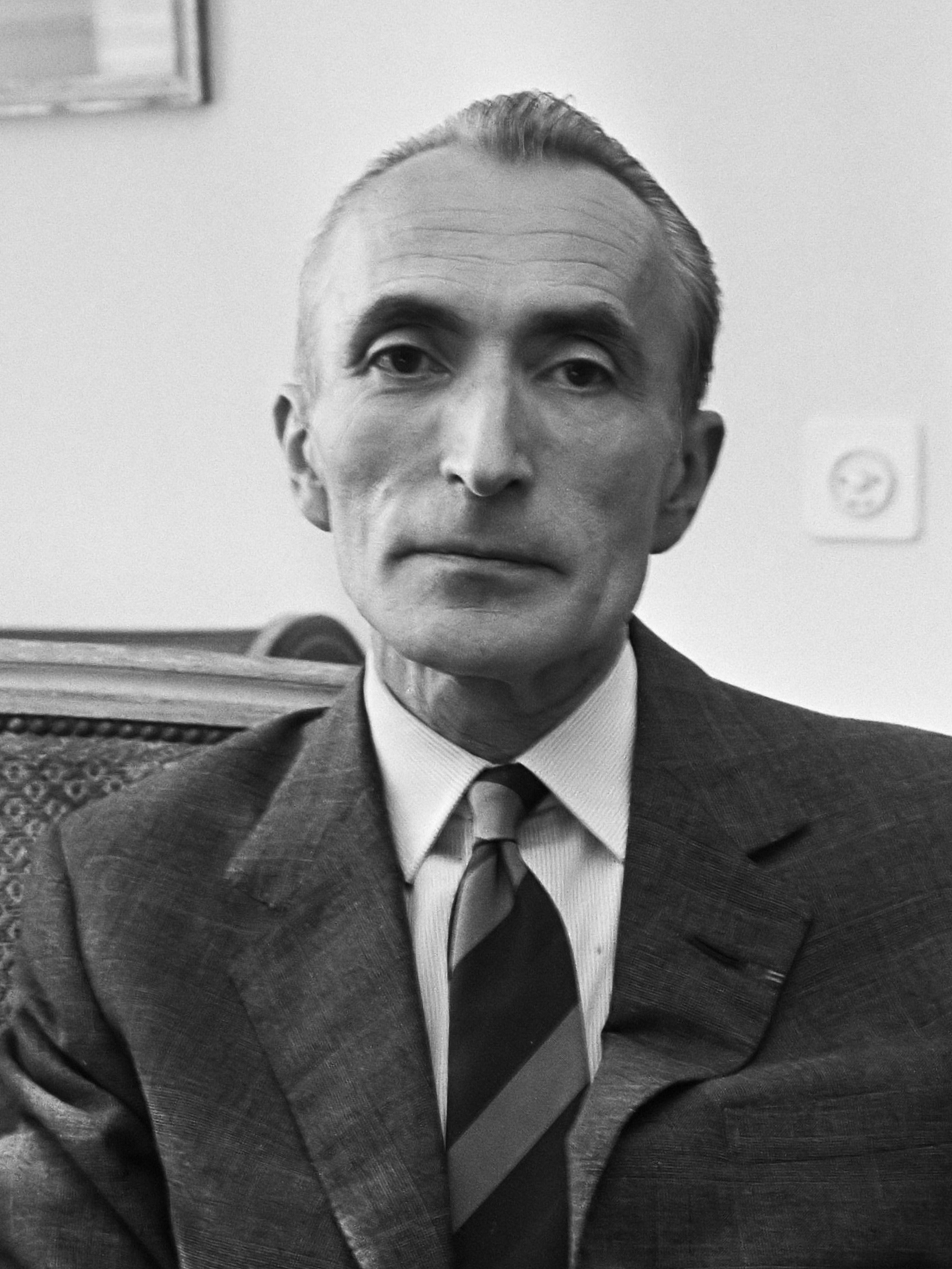
- Senard in 1974

French Inspector General of Foreign Affairs
- In office 1979–1981
- Succeeded by: Jean-Paul Anglès

Ambassador of France to Egypt
- In office 1976–1979
- Preceded by: Bruno de Leusse
- Succeeded by: Jacques Andreani

Ambassador of France to the Netherlands
- In office 1972–1976
- Preceded by: Christian Jacquin de Margerie
- Succeeded by: Luc de La Barre de Nanteuil

Personal details
- Born: 21 November 1919 Corgoloin, France
- Died: 22 September 2020 (aged 100) Arles, France

Jacques Senard (21 November 1919 – 22 September 2020) was a French diplomat.

== Biography ==
Senard was born into a family of landowners from Côte d'Or. His ancestor, Jules-Alexandre-Benjamin Senard, was given the title of Count by the Pope. In his childhood, he was a cellist. He studied at the École nationale d'administration.

Senard began his career in foreign affairs in 1947. He covered Europe and NATO while in the press service. He worked for the Secretary General of Foreign Affairs from 1967 to 1969. He was chief of protocol under Georges Pompidou from 1969 to 1972. During her visit to France in 1972, Queen Elizabeth II was received by Senard at her provincial residence, Château de Lagoy near Saint-Rémy-de-Provence. He then served as Ambassador to the Netherlands.

On 13 September 1974 in The Hague, Senard was one of ten people held hostage by Carlos the Jackal. He was held hostage for five days, including sixty hours without eating or drinking. Senard remained ambassador until 28 July 1976.

Senard was subsequently appointed Ambassador of France to Egypt, serving from 1976 to 1979, then serving as Inspector General of Foreign Affairs from 1979 to 1981. On 17 February 1981, he was appointed Ambassador of France to Italy. However, his time at Palazzo Farnese was brief due to his appointment as diplomatic advisor to the government of France on 4 November 1981. He was succeeded by Gilles Martinet, appointed on 19 November 1981.

Senard continued his duties as diplomatic advisor until 18 November 1984. On 17 May 1983, he was charged with chairing the interministerial commission for cooperation with West Germany. He officially retired on 24 November 1984.

Jacques Senard died in Arles on 22 September 2020 at the age of 100.

== Decorations ==
- Knight of the Legion of Honour (2016)
- Commander of the Ordre national du Mérite
- Croix de Guerre 1939–1945
