= Charles-Robert Ageron =

French historian (1923–2008)

- Born: Charles Robert Marie Ageron; 6 November 1923; 1st arrondissement of Lyon
- Died: 3 September 2008 (aged 84); Le Kremlin-Bicêtre
- Education: doctorate
- Alma mater: University of Paris
- Occupation: Historian, professeur des universités (1970–1988), assistant professor, researcher (1959–1961)
- Employer: French National Centre for Scientific Research (1959–1961); Lycée Lakanal (1957–1959); Paris-East Créteil University (1982–1988); University of Paris (1961–1969); University of Tours (1970–1982); lycée Gautier (1947–1957)
- Awards: Chevalier of the Legion of Honour (2001); CNRS bronze medal (1968)

Charles-Robert Ageron (6 November 1923 – 3 September 2008) was a French historian specializing in colonial Algeria. He was born on 6 November 1923 in Lyon and died on 3 September 2008 in Kremlin-Bicêtre.

== Education and career ==
Born in Lyon, teacher of history, he taught at the Gautier high school in Algiers from 1947, then at the Lakanal high school in Sceaux from 1957. He was a research associate at CNRS from 1959 to 1961. He became assistant and then associate professor at the Sorbonne University, where he taught until 1969. At the same time in 1968, led by Charles-André Julien, he presented his thesis on the situation of Muslims in Algeria and France from 1871 to 1919.

He was appointed professor at the University of Tours in 1970, then at the Université Paris XII in 1982. He chaired the Société française d'histoire d'outre-mer (French Society of overseas history) up to 2008 and directed the Revue française d'histoire d'outre-mer (French magazine of overseas history).

== Publications ==
- Politiques coloniales au Maghreb, ((in English) Colonial politics in Maghreb), PUF, 1973
- Histoire de l'Algérie contemporaine (1871–1954), ((in English)History of Contemporary Algeria (1871.1954)), PUF, 1979
- Histoire de la France coloniale, ((in English) History of colonial France colonial), Armand Colin, 1990
- La Argelia de los franceses, ((in English) The Algeria of the French), Seoul, 1993

== See also ==
- Colonial exhibition
