= Bruno de Leusse =

Baron Bruno de Leusse de Syon (1916–2009) was a French high-ranking government official, politician and diplomat. He was one of the negotiators of the Évian Accords. He was the French Ambassador to Algeria (1967–68), to Egypt (1972–76) and to the Soviet Union (1976–79). He was the president of the Union des Français de l'Étranger between 1981 and 1997 and the mayor of Nernier from 1987 to 2001.
