= History of Algeria (1962–1999) =

The history of Algeria from 1962 to 1999 includes the period starting with preparations for independence and the aftermath of the independence war with France in the 1960s to the Civil War and the 1999 presidential election.

== Independence ==
In preparation for independence, the CNRA (Conseil National de la Révolution Algérienne) had met in Tripoli in May 1962 to work out a plan for the FLN's (Front de Libération Nationale) transition from a liberation movement to a political party. The Tripoli Program called for land reform, the large-scale nationalization of industry and services, and a strong commitment to nonalignment and anti-colonialism in foreign relations. The platform also envisioned the FLN as a mass organization broad enough to encompass all nationalist groups. Adoption of the Tripoli Program notwithstanding, deep personal and ideological divisions surfaced within the FLN as the war drew to a close and the date for independence approached. Competition and confrontation among various factions not only deprived the FLN of a leadership that spoke with a single voice, but also almost resulted in full-scale civil war. According to historian John Ruedy, these factions, or "clans" did not embody "family or regional loyalties, as in the Arab East, because the generations-long detribalization of Algeria had been too thorough. Rather, they represented relationships based on school, wartime or other networking."

The Armée de Libération Nationale (ALN) commanders and the GPRA (Gouvernement Provisionel de la République Algérienne) struggled for power, including an unsuccessful attempt to dismiss Colonel Houari Boumédiènne, chief of staff of the ALN in Morocco. Boumédiènne formed an alliance with Ahmed Ben Bella, who together with Mohamed Khider and Rabah Bitat, announced the formation of the Political Bureau (Bureau Politique) as a rival government to the GPRA, which had installed itself in Algiers as the "Provisional Executive". Boumédiènne's forces entered Algiers in September, where he was joined by Ben Bella, who quickly consolidated his power. Ben Bella purged his political opponents from the single slate of candidates for the forthcoming Algerian National Assembly elections. However, underlying opposition to the Political Bureau and to the absence of alternative candidates was manifested in an 18 percent abstention rate nationwide that rose to 36 percent of the electorate in Algiers.

The creation of the People's Democratic Republic of Algeria was formally proclaimed at the opening session of the National Assembly on September 25, 1962. Ferhat Abbas, a moderate unconnected with the Political Bureau, who had previously headed the GPRA, was elected president of the assembly by the delegates, and Ben Bella was named prime minister. On the following day, Ben Bella formed a cabinet that was representative of the Political Bureau but that also included Boumédiènne as defense minister as well as other members of the so-called Oujda Group, who had served under him with the external forces in Morocco. Ben Bella, Boumédiènne, and Khider initially formed a triumvirate linking the leadership of the three power bases — the army, the party, and the government, respectively. However, Ben Bella's ambitions and authoritarian tendencies were to lead the triumvirate to unravel and provoke increasing discontent among Algerians.

== Aftermath of the war ==
The war of national liberation and its aftermath severely disrupted Algeria's society and economy. In addition to the physical destruction, the exodus of the colons deprived the country of most of its managers, civil servants, engineers, teachers, physicians, and skilled workers — all occupations which colonial policy had prevented or discouraged the Muslim population from pursuing. The homeless and displaced numbered in the hundreds of thousands, many suffering from illness, and some 70 percent of the workforce unemployed. Distribution of goods was at a standstill. Departing colons destroyed or carried off public records and utility plans, leaving public services in shambles. So, not only were the Algerian countryside and infrastructure destroyed, but also, almost half the rural population was forcibly displaced. Algerians now faced the task of replacing the colonial administration, which had been run by European settlers who left en masse after independence in 1962. Staffing these positions was especially difficult due to the fact that 86% of Algerians were illiterate in 1954. In 1962, the year of independence, not many Algerians had a university education, and although the number of university graduates increased throughout the 1960s and 1970s, it was still not enough to avoid certain political and social consequences. Given the low number of educated Algerians in 1962, the few university graduates had to carry the burden of helping rebuild a country following years of colonial occupation. They had to attempt to come up with solutions to issues like access to healthcare, transportation, and the eradication of illiteracy.

Along with the help of Algerian university graduates, the solutions to these problems were often found through international assistance from actors like France, the Soviet Union, Cuba, Yugoslavia, and the Arab world. Rather than commit to being part of a single world bloc (whether that be the US-led capitalist bloc or the Soviet-led communist bloc), Algeria remained non-aligned, focusing on organized, state-led development, investing in healthcare, education, agriculture, oil, and petrol. The role of university students in helping rebuild post-independence Algeria is often ignored, however. Projects like Generation Independence, a series of documentaries about Algerian university graduates in the 1960s and 1970s, attempt to rectify that.

Another challenge the newly sovereign Algerian government faced in the aftermath of the war was resettling the millions of displaced Algerians, both within Algeria's borders and outside of them. When neighboring countries Tunisia and Morocco became independent in 1956 (two years after the Algerian war for independence began), many Algerians fled to them to escape the violence within their borders. Later in the war, when the French army began to create 'forbidden zones' in the mountainous regions of the country, the number of Algerians fleeing their home country sharply increased, as they sought to avoid being sent to regroupment camps (camp de regroupement.)

While before the end of the war, the FLN struggled to exercise sovereignty within Algerian borders, it found diplomatic strength in interacting with international organizations dealing with refugees, most notably the UNHCR. In claiming responsibility for the Algerian refugees in Morocco and Tunisia, the FLN assumed state-like responsibilities. In tandem, through accepting Algerian refugees, newly independent Morocco and Tunisia were able to assert their "new-found sovereignty in the international sphere." In the war's aftermath, repatriating refugees from Tunisia and Morocco to Algeria would require considerable effort on the part of all three states and the UNHCR, and in determining which populations qualified for international assistance to return to Algeria (or which were really Moroccan or Tunisian subjects), formal and documented national identities were formed and enforced in the "previously fluid and intermingled populations of French north Africa." While some nomadic tribes during French colonization flowed easily through the now hardened national borders, independence for Morocco, Tunisia, and now Algeria, meant that these tribes would have to remain inside the borders of one state. In all, the refugee crisis created by the war for independence presented the Algerian state with considerable challenges as a newly established government, while also providing them a channel to establish their statehood through diplomacy in north Africa and with international aid organizations.

The months immediately following independence witnessed a pell-mell rush of Algerians, their government, and its officials to claim the lands, houses, businesses, automobiles, bank accounts, and jobs left behind by the departed Pieds-Noirs. By the 1963 March Decrees, Ben Bella declared that all agricultural, industrial, and commercial properties previously operated and occupied by Pieds-Noirs were vacant, thereby legalizing their confiscation by the state. The term "nationalization" was not used in the decrees, presumably to avoid indemnity claims.

The FLN called its policy of widespread state involvement in the economy "Algerian socialism". Public-sector enterprises were gradually organized into state corporations that participated in virtually every aspect of the country's economic life. Although their activities were coordinated by central authorities, each state corporation was supposed to retain a measure of autonomy within its own sphere.

The departure of European owners and managers from factories and agricultural estates gave rise to a spontaneous, grass-roots phenomenon, later termed autogestion, which saw workers take control of the enterprises to keep them operating. Seeking to capitalize on the popularity of the self-management movement, Ben Bella formalized autogestion in the March Decrees. As the process evolved, workers in state-owned farms and enterprises and in agricultural cooperatives elected boards of managers that directed production activities, financing, and marketing in conjunction with state-appointed directors. The system proved to be a failure, however. The crucial agricultural sector suffered particularly under self-management, partly as result of bureaucratic incompetence, graft, and theft.

== Ben Bella and the FLN ==
Whereas Ben Bella could count on the support of an overwhelming majority in the National Assembly, an opposition group led by Hocine Ait Ahmed soon emerged. Opponents outside the government included the supporters of Messali Hadj, the PCA, and the left-wing Party of the Socialist Revolution (Parti de la Révolution Socialiste, PRS) led by Mohamed Boudiaf. The communists, who were excluded from the FLN and therefore from any direct political rule, were particularly influential in the postindependence press. The activities of all these groups were subsequently banned, and Boudiaf was arrested. When opposition from the General Union of Algerian Workers (Union Générale des Travailleurs Algériens, UGTA) was perceived, the trade union organization was subsumed under FLN control.

Contrary to the intent of the Tripoli Program, Ben Bella saw the FLN as an elite vanguard party that would mobilize popular support for government policies and reinforce his increasingly personal leadership of the country. Because Khider envisioned the FLN as playing a more encompassing, advisory role, Ben Bella forced him from office in April 1963 and replaced him as party secretary general. Khider later absconded with the equivalent of US$12 million in party funds into exile in Switzerland. In August 1963, Abbas resigned as assembly president to protest what he termed the FLN's usurpation of the legislature's authority. He was subsequently put under house arrest. A new constitution drawn up under close FLN supervision was approved by nationwide referendum in September, and Ben Bella was confirmed as the party's choice to lead the country for a five-year term. Under the new constitution, Ben Bella as president combined the functions of chief of state and head of government with that of supreme commander of the armed forces. He formed his government without needing legislative approval and was responsible for the definition and direction of its policies. There was no effective institutional check on its powers.

Ait Ahmed quit the National Assembly to protest the increasingly dictatorial tendencies of the regime, which had reduced the functions of the legislature to rubber-stamping presidential directives. The Kabyle leaders also condemned the government for its failure to carry through on reconstruction projects in war-ravaged Kabylie, but Ait Ahmed's aims went beyond rectifying regional complaints. He formed a clandestine resistance movement, the Socialist Forces Front (Front des Forces Socialistes, FFS), based in the Kabylie and dedicated to overthrowing the Ben Bella regime by force. Late summer 1963 saw sporadic incidents attributed to the FFS and required the movement of regular troops into the Kabylie.

More serious fighting broke out a year later in the Kabylie as well as in the southern Sahara. The insurgent movement was organized by the National Committee for the Defense of the Revolution (Comité National pour la Défense de la Révolution, CNDR), which joined the remnants of Ait Ahmed's FFS and Boudiaf's PRS with the surviving regional military leaders. Khider was believed to have helped finance the operation. The army moved quickly and in force to crush the rebellion. Ait Ahmed and Colonel Mohamed Chabaani, a wilaya commander leading insurgents in the Sahara, were captured and sentenced to death in 1965, after a trial in which Khider and Boudiaf were similarly condemned in absentia. Chabaani was executed, but Ait Ahmed's sentence was subsequently commuted to life imprisonment. In 1966 he escaped from prison and fled to Europe where he joined the two other chefs historiques in exile.

As minister of defense, Boumédiènne had no qualms about sending the army to crush regional uprisings because he felt they posed a threat to the state. However, when Ben Bella attempted to co-opt allies from among some of the same regionalists whom the army had been called out to suppress, tensions increased between Boumediene and Ben Bella. In April 1965, Ben Bella issued orders to local police prefects to report directly to him rather than through normal channels in the Ministry of Interior. The minister, Ahmed Medeghri, one of Boumediene's closest associates in the Oujda Group, resigned his portfolio in protest and was replaced by a Political Bureau loyalist. Ben Bella next sought to remove Abdelaziz Bouteflika, another Boumediene confidant, as minister of foreign affairs and was believed to be planning a direct confrontation with Boumediene to force his ouster. On June 19, however, Boumediene deposed Ben Bella in a military coup d'état that was both swift and bloodless. The ousted president was taken into custody and held incommunicado.

== Boumédiènne Regime ==
Boumédiènne described the military coup as a "historic rectification" of the Algerian War of Independence. Boumédiènne dissolved the National Assembly, suspended the 1963 constitution, disbanded the militia, and abolished the Political Bureau, which he considered an instrument of Ben Bella's personal rule.

Until a new constitution was adopted, political power resided in the Council of the Revolution, a predominantly military body intended to foster cooperation among various factions in the army and the party. The council's original twenty-six members included former internal military leaders, former Political Bureau members, and senior officers of the Armée Nationale Populaire (ANP, People's National Army) closely associated with Boumédiènne in the coup. They were expected to exercise collegial responsibility for overseeing the activities of the new government, which was conducted by the largely civilian Council of Ministers, or cabinet, appointed by Boumédiènne. The cabinet, which shared some functions with the Council of the Revolution, was also inclusive; it contained an Islamic leader, technical experts, FLN regulars, as well as others representing a broad range of Algerian political and institutional life.

Boumédiènne showed himself to be an ardent nationalist, deeply influenced by Islamic values, and he was reportedly one of the few prominent Algerian leaders who expressed himself better in Arabic than in French. He seized control of the country not to initiate military rule, but to protect the interests of the army, which he felt were threatened by Ben Bella. Boumédiènne's position as head of government and of state was not secure initially, partly because of his lack of a significant power base outside the armed forces. This situation may have accounted for his deference to collegial rule as a means of reconciling competing factions. Nonetheless, FLN radicals criticized Boumédiènne for neglecting the policy of autogestion and betraying "rigorous socialism"; in addition, some military officers were unsettled by what they saw as a drift away from collegiality. There were coup attempts and a failed assassination in 1967—68, after which opponents were exiled or imprisoned and Boumediene's power consolidated.

Agricultural production, meanwhile, still failed to meet the country's food needs. The so-called agricultural revolution that Boumédiènne launched in 1971 called for the seizure of additional property and the redistribution of the newly acquired public lands to cooperative farms.

A significant regional event was Boumédiènne's 1975 pledge of support for an independent Western Sahara, admitting Sahrawi bedouin refugees and the Polisario Front guerrilla movement to construct refugee camps in the Tindouf Province of western Algeria, as their home country was overrun by Morocco and Mauritania. The Western Sahara conflict came to completely dominate Moroccan-Algerian relations, already sour after the 1963 Sand war, as well as transnational Maghrebi politics. The reasons for this were twofold: the strong anticolonial sentiment left behind by the liberation war, as well as the need to find an effective proxy force to counter Moroccan ambitions. Polisario proved an effective outlet for both. With Algerian backing, its leader El-Ouali on February 27, 1976 announced the formation of a Sahrawi Arab Democratic Republic, a government-in-exile for Western Sahara, which took autonomous control over the refugee camps south of Tindouf, and the interests of which became a pillar of Algerian foreign policy.

Eleven years after he took power, in April 1976, Boumediene set out in a draft document called the National Charter the principles on which the long-promised constitution would be based. After much public debate, the constitution was promulgated in November 1976, and Boumédiènne was elected president with 95 percent of the votes. Boumédiènne's death on December 27, 1978, set off a struggle within the FLN to choose a successor. As a compromise to break a deadlock between two other candidates, Colonel Chadli Bendjedid, a relative outsider, was sworn in on February 9, 1979.

== Chadli Bendjedid ==
Bendjedid, who had collaborated with Boumediene in the plot that disposed of Ben Bella, was regarded as a moderate, not identified with any group or faction. He did, however, command wide support within the military establishment. In June 1980, he summoned an extraordinary FLN Party Congress to examine the draft of the five-year development plan for 1980–84. The resultant First Five Year Plan liberalized the economy and broke up unwieldy state corporations.

The Benjedid regime was also marked by the Berber Spring protests from Kabyle university students who objected to Arabization measures in government and especially in education. Although Bendjedid reaffirmed the government's long-term commitment to Arabization, he upgraded Berber studies at the university level and granted media access to Berber-language programs. These concessions, however, provoked counterprotests from Islamists (also seen as fundamentalists).

Islamists gained increasing influence in part because the government was unable to keep its economic promises. In the late 1970s, Muslim activists engaged in isolated and relatively small-scale assertions of their will: harassing women who they felt were inappropriately dressed, smashing establishments that served alcoholic beverages, and evicting official imams from their mosques. The Islamists escalated their actions in 1982, when they called for the abrogation of the National Charter and the formation of an Islamic government. Amidst an increasing number of violent incidents on campuses, Islamists killed one student. After police arrested 400 Islamists, about 100,000 demonstrators thronged to Friday prayers at the university mosque. The arrests of hundreds more activists, including prominent leaders of the movement, Shaykh Abdelatif Sultani and Shaykh Ahmed Sahnoun resulted in a lessening of Islamist actions for several years. Nonetheless, in light of the massive support the Islamists could muster, the authorities henceforth viewed them as a potentially grave threat to the state and alternately treated them with harshness and respect. In 1984, for example, the government opened in Constantine one of the largest Islamic universities in the world. In the same year, acceding to Islamist demands, the government passed the Algerian Family Code, making family law conform closely to sharia and considering women as wards of their families before marriage and of their husbands after marriage.

The 1980s oil glut deepened the country's economic crisis after the mid-decade, resulting in, among other things, increased unemployment, a lack of consumer goods, and shortages in cooking oil, semolina, coffee, and tea. Women waited in long lines for scarce and expensive food; young men milled in frustration on street corners unable to find work. An already bad situation was aggravated by the huge drop in world oil prices in 1986. Dismantling Algeria's socialist system seemed to Bendjedid the only way to improve the economy. In 1987 he announced reforms that would return control and profits to private hands, starting with agriculture and continuing to the large state enterprises and banks.

Notwithstanding the introduction of reform measures, incidents indicating social unrest increased in Algiers and other cities as the economy foundered from 1985 to 1988. The alienation and anger of the population were fanned by the widespread perception that the government had become corrupt and aloof. The waves of discontent crested in October 1988 when a series of strikes and walkouts by students and workers in Algiers degenerated into rioting by thousands of young men, who destroyed government and FLN property. When the violence spread to Annaba, Blida, Oran, and other cities and towns, the government declared a state of emergency and began using force to quell the unrest. By October 10, the security forces had restored a semblance of order; unofficial estimates were that more than 500 people were killed and more than 3,500 arrested.

The stringent measures used to put down the riots of "Black October" engendered a ground swell of outrage. Islamists took control of some areas. Unsanctioned independent organizations of lawyers, students, journalists, and physicians sprang up to demand justice and change. In response, Bendjedid conducted a house cleaning of senior officials and drew up a program of political reform. In December he was offered the chance to implement the reforms when he was reelected, albeit by a reduced margin. A new constitution, approved overwhelmingly in February 1989, dropped the word "socialist" from the official description of the country; guaranteed freedoms of expression, association, and meeting; and withdrew the guarantees of female rights that appeared in the 1976 constitution. The FLN was not mentioned in the document at all, and the army was discussed only in the context of national defense, reflecting a significant downgrading of its political status.

Politics were reinvigorated in 1989 under the new laws. Newspapers became the liveliest and freest in the Arab world, while political parties of nearly every stripe vied for members and a voice. In February 1989, Abbassi Madani and Ali Belhadj founded the Islamic Salvation Front (Front Islamique du Salut, FIS). Although the constitution prohibited religious parties, the FIS came to play a significant role in Algerian politics. It handily defeated the FLN in local and provincial elections held in June 1990, in part because most secular parties boycotted the elections. The FLN's response was to adopt a new electoral law that openly aided the FLN. The FIS, in turn, called a general strike, organized demonstrations, and occupied public places. Bendjedid declared martial law on June 5, 1991, but he also asked his minister of foreign affairs, Sid Ahmed Ghozali, to form a new government of national reconciliation. Although the FIS seemed satisfied with Ghozali's appointment and his attempts to clean up the electoral law, it continued to protest, leading the army to arrest Belhadj, Madani, and hundreds of others. The state of emergency ended in September.

Algeria's leaders were stunned in December 1991 when FIS candidates won absolute majorities in 188 of 430 electoral districts, far ahead of the FLN's fifteen seats. Some members of Bendjedid's cabinet, fearing a complete FIS takeover, forced the president to dissolve parliament and to resign on January 11, 1992. Leaders of the takeover included Ghozali, and generals Khaled Nezzar (minister of defense) and Larbi Belkheir (minister of interior). After they declared the elections void, the takeover leaders and Mohamed Boudiaf formed the High Council of State to rule the country. The FIS, as well as the FLN, clamored for a return of the electoral process, but police and troops countered with massive arrests. In February 1992, violent demonstrations broke out in many cities, and on February 9 the government declared a one-year state of emergency and the next month banned the FIS.

== 1990s ==
Despite occasional efforts to restore the political process, violence and terrorism characterized the Algeria landscape during the 1990s. In 1994, Liamine Zéroual was appointed Head of State for a 3-year term. During this period, the Armed Islamic Group (GIA) launched terrorist campaigns against government figures and institutions to protest the banning of the Islamist parties. When it took to massacring civilians not involved in politics, a faction based in the east-central region broke away in protest, establishing the Salafist Group for Preaching and Combat (GSPC), which continued fighting for some time after the effective demise of the GIA. Some government officials estimate that more than 100,000 Algerians died during this period.

Zeroual called for presidential elections in 1995, though some parties objected to holding elections that excluded the FIS. Zeroual was elected president with 75% of the vote. In 1997, the pro-Zeroual Rassemblement National Democratique (RND) party was formed by a group of FLN members who rejected the FLN's advocacy of negotiation with FIS. Zeroual announced that presidential elections would be held in early 1999, nearly 2 years ahead of the scheduled time.

Algerians went to the polls in April 1999, following a campaign in which seven candidates qualified for election. On the eve of the election, all candidates except Abdelaziz Bouteflika pulled out amid charges of widespread electoral fraud. Bouteflika, the candidate who appeared to enjoy the backing of the military, as well as FLN and RND party regulars, won with an official vote count of 70% of all votes cast. He was inaugurated on April 27, 1999 for a 5-year term.

== Lack of Historiography ==
The historiography on this period, particularly for the 1960s and 1970s, is fairly limited. Most of the history on Algeria focuses on its anti-colonial struggle, with detailed events being discussed until 1962, when Algeria became independent. The literature on Algerian history typically considers its colonisation, the war of independence, and the civil violence of the 1990s.

Compared to the dates and events which are present in the historiography on Algeria’s war of independence or the 1990s, there is not much literature on the 1960s and 1970s, despite the fact that this period was also packed with various events. The Revue Algérienne des Sciences Juridiques, Politiques et Economiques, published for 1964 and the first two months of 1965, is 23 pages long, and contains almost daily happenings.

The work of historians varies considerably between the colonial and post-colonial periods of Algerian history. This is both in quantity- since less historians study post-1962 Algeria- and quality, as research on this period is typically not carried out by experienced academics.

Various factors contribute to this lack of historiography, as history for the years following 1962 is often difficult to research. This is due to several aspects of post-independence Algeria. One such feature is state propaganda. The Front de Libération nationale (FLN) shaped the national narrative in Algeria as a way of anchoring its legitimacy. This narrative encouraged the adoption of the morals and attitudes of the FLN, and was assimilated into official texts, such as the 1963, 1976, and 1989 constitutions. The FLN also excluded its opposing political forces from this imposed narrative. Their determination to control the rendering of events influenced the questions which historians could ask, as well as the material available to them. As a result, it contributed to the lack of historiography on post-1962 Algeria.

Another reason for the insufficient literature on Algeria following independence is the destruction of documents. Following 1962, archives became very difficult to access, as the national archives on Algerian territory were no longer created by the French colonial administration, but by the newly independent state. This resulted in a switch from a period with a relative abundance of sources to one with nearly no national archives. It had a large effect on the experience of historians when writing works on this period. Also, while the state archives of the colonial period are available in Algeria and France to a certain extent, the Algerian National Archives never gave access to state archives for the independence period, once again creating disparities between the studies of the different periods. Another barrier in the study of post-independence documents is Arabization. Nowadays, whereas most of the relevant archives are in French, history students are typically Arabophones. There was also a gap between university students and their professors, who preferred writing in French, which affected their ability to instruct their students on the necessary skills for studying contemporary history. Also, although there is an international academic community that studies colonial Algeria, there is no such group for independent Algeria.

The difficulty in accessing written sources made witness stories more important when it came to researching contemporary Algerian history. This was not helped by the hesitation of most witnesses to recount their experiences, however, which also played a role in limiting the historiography of post-1962 Algeria. The accounts of witnesses were reported to have become more unsure once the threshold of 1962 was passed, once again hinting at the overshadowing of more contemporary Algerian history by its colonial past. Moreover, some interviewees expressed regional points of view on the war of independence, ignoring both the post-1962 period and certain regions of Algeria. Some historians have also remarked that “after 1962, the past is not history,” diminishing the importance of that time. Although recollections of this period are starting to become more willingly shared, it is still difficult to find evidence to support the memories of its witnesses. The FLN’s ‘memorial context of post-independence Algeria’ even impacted historians’ ability to locate witnesses of pre-independence Algeria and its political events, and it also explains why witnesses were often so hesitant to tell stories of post-1962 Algeria- for fear of contradicting the FLN-imposed narrative. Therefore, many historians working on the history of Algeria view 1962 as ‘the end of history.’ This is also the case with actors of that period, who, for a long time after independence was achieved, did not speak of their experiences.

== Sources ==
- Original text: Library of Congress Country Study of Algeria
