= Alistair Horne =

British writer and historian

Sir Alistair Horne CBE FRSL
- Born: 9 November 1925; London, England
- Died: 25 May 2017 (aged 91); Oxfordshire, England
- Education: Millbrook School
- Alma mater: Jesus College, Cambridge
- Occupations: Journalist; biographer; historian
- Notable work: The Price of Glory (1962); A Savage War of Peace (1977)
- Spouses: Renira Hawkins (m. 1953; div. 1982); Sheelin Ryan (m. 1987)

Sir Alistair Allan Horne CBE FRSL (9 November 1925 – 25 May 2017) was a British historian and academic best known for his works about armed conflicts involving 19th- and 20th-century France, including his classic about the Algerian War, A Savage War of Peace. A former spy and journalist, Horne wrote more than 20 books on travel, history, and biography.

Horne became a senior member at St Antony's College, Oxford in 1970 and a fellow of the college in 1978. He was made an honorary fellow in 1988, a position he held until his death. He was knighted in the Queen's Birthday Honours in 2003 for services to Anglo-French relations.

== Early life and education ==
Horne was born on 9 November 1925. He was the only son of Sir Allan Horne (died 1944) and Auriol (née Hay-Drummond), niece of the 13th Earl of Kinnoull. He was educated at Eastacre, then Ludgrove School when it was at Cockfosters and described Ludgrove as a place of "humbug, snobbery and rampant, unchecked bullying" which he thought was intended to toughen the boys up. He seems to have hated Stowe, which he escaped from to America during wartime.

As a boy during World War II, Horne was sent to live in the United States. He attended Millbrook School, where he befriended William F. Buckley Jr., who remained a lifelong friend. Horne served in the RAF (1943–44) and later as an officer in the Coldstream Guards (1944–47). He graduated from Jesus College, Cambridge, as a Master of Arts (Cantab) and received the honorary degree of LittD from the University of Cambridge (1993).

== Personal life ==
His first marriage was in 1953 to Renira Hawkins, the daughter of Admiral Sir Geoffrey Hawkins. They had three daughters. The marriage was dissolved in 1982, and, in 1987, he married Sheelin Lorraine Ryan, an artist and former wife of Simon Eccles, son of David Eccles, 1st Viscount Eccles. They lived at Turville, Buckinghamshire.

He campaigned against the opening of a Montessori school adjacent to his Turville home because Reverend Paul Nicolson, the vicar responsible for the project, planned to use the project to fund summer vacations at the school for children from nearby London.

Horne was a cricket enthusiast.

== Career ==
Horne worked as a foreign correspondent for The Daily Telegraph from 1952 to 1955, stationed in Berlin. In 1953, he was recruited by MI6 and used his job as a journalist as a cover for his spying. He left the world of espionage for history when he was sacked from the Telegraph in 1955, allegedly for offending the wife of the chairman of the newspaper.

Horne was the official biographer of British Prime Minister Harold Macmillan, a work originally published (in two volumes) in 1988. The Price of Glory: Verdun 1916 received the Hawthornden Prize in 1963.

Horne's 1977 book A Savage War of Peace: Algeria 1954–1962 received the Wolfson Prize in 1978. Following the 2003 American invasion of Iraq, A Savage War of Peace: Algeria 1954–1962 came to be of much interest to American military officers, having been recommended to U.S. President George W. Bush by Kissinger. In October 2006 the book was republished and in January 2007, by phone from his home in England, Horne was invited to take part in an Iraq War discussion panel on the Charlie Rose Show on PBS. It was reported, in the 2 July 2007 edition of The Washington Post, 'that Horne met with President Bush sometime in mid-2007 at the administration's request'. He described his visit in a Daily Telegraph article.

In 2004, Horne was offered the authorship of former U.S. Secretary of State Henry Kissinger's official biography but declined due to the daunting amount of work involved and his age and opted instead to write a volume on one year in Kissinger's life (Kissinger: 1973, The Crucial Year, 2009).

== Alistair Horne Fellowship ==
He endowed the Alistair Horne Fellowship at St Antony's College to provide financial assistance and college membership to young historians focused on writing a book on modern history. Those receiving the fellowship are able to become senior members of St Antony's.

== Selected works ==
- Return to Power: A Report on the New Germany. New York: Praeger, 1956. OCLC 184441
- The Land is Bright. 1958.
- Canada and the Canadians. Toronto: Macmillan, 1961.
- The Price of Glory: Verdun 1916. New York: St. Martin's Press, 1962. Reissued in 1963. OCLC 397845
- The Fall of Paris: The Siege and the Commune, 1870–1871. London: Macmillan, 1965. OCLC 401286 Revised edition: Penguin Books 2007, ISBN 978-0-141-03063-0.
- To Lose a Battle: France 1940. London, Macmillan, 1969.
- Death of a Generation Neuve Chapelle to Verdun and the Somme 1970
- The Terrible Year: The Paris Commune, 1871. London, Macmillan, 1971.
- Small Earthquake in Chile: A Visit to Allende's South America. London: Macmillan, 1972. (Expanded edition, 1990.)
- A Savage War of Peace: Algeria 1954–1962. London: Macmillan, 1977. ISBN 0670619647
- Napoleon, Master of Europe 1805–1807. London: Weidenfeld and Nicolson, 1979. ISBN 0297776789
- The French Army and Politics, 1870–1970. New York: Peter Bedrick Books, 1984.
- Harold Macmillan. New York: Viking Press, 1988. [Official biography]
  - Volume I: 1894-1956
  - Volume II: 1957-1986
- A Bundle from Britain. New York: St. Martin's Press, 1993. (Memoir)
- Montgomery, David (co-author). Monty: The Lonely Leader, 1944–1945. New York: HarperCollins, 1994.
- How Far from Austerlitz? Napoleon, 1805–1815. New York: St. Martin's Press, 1996. ISBN 0312155484
- Horne, A. (ed.).Telling Lives: From W.B. Yeats to Bruce Chatwin. London: Papermac, 2000.
- Seven Ages of Paris. London: Macmillan, 2002. American ed., ISBN 0679454810
- The Age of Napoleon. New York: Modern Library, 2004. ISBN 1588363643
- Friend or Foe: An Anglo-Saxon History of France. London: Weidenfeld & Nicolson, 2004. ISBN 0297848941
- La Belle France: A Short History. Alfred A. Knopf, 2005. ISBN 1400041406
- The French Revolution. Carlton Books, 2009.
- Kissinger: 1973, The Crucial Year. Simon & Schuster, June 2009. ISBN 9780743272834
- But What Do You Actually Do?: A Literary Vagabondage. London: Weidenfeld & Nicolson, 2011. ISBN 029784895X
- Hubris: The Tragedy of War in the Twentieth Century. Harper, 2015. ISBN 9780062397805

== Honours and awards ==
- CBE (1992)
- Knight Bachelor (2003)
- Chevalier, Ordre de la Légion d'honneur (1993)
- Fellow, Royal Society of Literature (1968)
