= Challe Plan =

1959–1961 French offensive in the Algerian War

- Part of the Algerian War
Date	6 February 1959 – April 1961
Location	Northern Algeria
Result	see § Aftermath

Belligerents
France	FLN

Commanders and leaders
Maurice Challe (Commander-in-Chief in Algeria)	Houari Boumédiène (Commander-in-Chief of the ALN); Mohand Oulhadj (Commander of Wilaya 3); Si El Haouès † (Commander of Wilaya 6); M'Hamed Bougara (Commander of Wilaya 4); Colonel Amirouche †

Strength
~15,000 professional troops (Note: Does not include the entirety of France's military, which was considerably larger, but not involved in this operation.); ~60,000 Harki troops	~21,150 troops in October 1958

Casualties and losses
Low	Per France: 3,746 killed Per FLN: Heavy

Challe Plan (French: Plan Challe), also known as Challe Offensive, was the codename of a strategic offensive carried out by France in 1959–1961 during the Algerian War. Named after the French general in command, Maurice Challe, the plan resulted in French troops regaining control over much of northern Algeria, weakening the National Liberation Army (ALN) forces for a while and marking a point of maximal French military dominance during the war. Despite some military successes, the Plan failed to achieve its objective, the ALN was not defeated and the cause for Algerian self-determination had only grown more popular, both domestically in France and internationally.

== Background ==
From 1954, France was embroiled in the Algerian War, in which the National Liberation Front (FLN) and its military wing, the National Liberation Army (ALN) fought French troops in order to achieve Algerian independence. By 1958, the French Fourth Republic was in deep political crisis, primarily beset by concerns over the competence of French troops in Algeria and of the protection of the Pieds-noirs. Tensions finally culminated in the May 1958 crisis, which saw General Charles de Gaulle take power and establish the French Fifth Republic.

De Gaulle began his presidency with the formulation of the Constantine Plan, a development program aimed at improving the likelihoods of Algerians, in order to lessen support for separatism and to inspire loyalty to Paris. The plan, however, was largely unsuccessful. In early 1959, De Gaulle resorted to a decisive military offensive to cripple Algerian nationalist forces and re-establish French control over all of Algeria — which was officially part of Metropolitan France and not an overseas colony.

== Offensive ==
=== Beginning of operations ===
Plan Challe began with the execution of Operation Crown (French: Couronne) in the vicinity of Saida (Wilaya 5) on 6 February 1959. This area was chosen due to the generally weaker FLN presence and comparatively less rugged terrain, which allowed French troops to utilise their mechanised forces to a greater degree. The French plan hinged on massive firepower concentration in a small area, so the entirety of the 10th Parachute Division, the French Foreign Legion (attached to the 10th Para) and all available troops from the Oran military zone were engaged in the operation. Their principal role was to establish a "cordon" (a functional encirclement) in which all FLN troops were to be rounded up and eliminated. Additionally, the Commandos de Chasse were sent inside the cordon to track and identify Algerian troops.

A principal tactical innovation and departure from earlier French strategy was the greater focus on air power. After the Commandos identified a target, they would stay in contact until the target was destroyed by other troops, supported by tactical air strikes. More reserve troops would move in to root out local FLN administration and would only leave once the troops assigned to this sector were able to fully occupy the area.

Operation Crown continued until April. The French reported upwards of 1600 FLN troops killed in action, 460 captured and large stocks of weapons and ammunition seized. General Challe claimed that these losses amounted to half the FLN's manpower and a similar fraction of their weaponry. Particularly successful were the operations around the cities of Mascara and Saida, where French troops under the command of Marcel Bigeard captured the local FLN commander, Youssef Smail.

=== Continued offensive ===
The early success of Operation Crown encouraged the French to continue the offensive in a similar format. On 18 April 1959, Operation Belt (French: Courroie) was launched in the eastern reaches of the Ouarsenis mountain range behind Algiers in Wilaya 4. It largely went in a similar fashion to the preceding operation, though Challe noted that the FLN were able to hide and disperse quicker, while the French troops 'lacked vigour' in executing operations. Operation Spark (French: Étincelle) was also launched in July, aiming to clear the Hodna Mountains from ALN troops, thus isolating Wilaya 3.

At this point in the campaign, France had mustered together a large and capable aircraft fleet for use in Algeria. The American Flying Banana planes were particularly notable for allowing up to 2 battalions to be transported into action within 5 minutes. Even up to 300 of the T-6 trainer aircraft were used in combat, as their much slower top speed (as compared to modern jets) allowed for greater accuracy on stationary targets, while also being cheaper and quicker to repair if damaged.

The Commandos de Chasse (lit. 'Commandos of the Hunt'), composed in large part of Harkis, would perform at its best during this period. They operated in a similar way to that of the ALN insurgents: hiking out for days in rough terrain, living off the land, but were also in constant radio contact with military leadership.

=== Operation Binoculars ===
Having gained valuable experience and already inflicted heavy losses upon the separatist troops, the French moved to execute the principal part of the plan: Operation Binoculars (French: Jumelles), aimed at clearing the region of Kabylia, located largely in Wilaya 3, from ALN troops. This region was a key stronghold of the FLN, as it was protected by mountains and the local population - numbering over a million inhabitants - widely supported the FLN.

While Binoculars was originally intended to begin on 22 July 1959 with a two-pronged assault, accompanied by amphibious landings to bypass the mountain ranges, the French received new intelligence on the eve of executing the operation. ALN forces were planning to secure the Hodna range again, thus linking Kabylia with friendly forces in the Aures. The French command decided to instead launch a surprise attack in the Hodna, successfully preventing the different ALN groups from consolidating and inflicting heavy casualties.

== Aftermath ==
For the ALN, 1959 was the hardest year. Morale amongst ALN troops faltered, while resentment towards the exterior military commanders grew, but the dissent was repressed by Boumediene, the newly elected ALN chief of staff who continued to build up the army of the frontiers.

The Challe plan, despite military success, failed to achieve its ultimate goal and the FLN were not defeated. For political reasons, the offensive was halted by De Gaulle. The ALN were able to reorganise and even inflict a defeat on the French at Djebel Bouk'hil in September 1961. The war, by this stage, had become an international embarrassment and a drain on France's economy. De Gaulle therefore put his efforts into seeking a political solution. The Colons and part of the army resisted this move, which nearly resulted in a civil war; Challe himself was one of the heads of the Algiers Putsch, along with Raoul Salan. All this achieved however for France was a confused humiliating withdrawal from Algeria.

== Humanitarian impact ==
During the course of the execution of the Challe Plan, severe humanitarian damage was brought upon civilians as a consequence of intense fighting, French "pacification" tactics and the breakdown of normal economic activity.

=== Farming and free-fire zones ===
One part of French strategy which contributed heavily to civilian casualties was the wide-spread usage of "free-fire zones" (French: zones interdites). First conceived in 1957, these zones involved the French military taking control of an area and forcibly displacing the local residents, often without any prior notice. Then, the area would be checked for FLN troops while any resources or shelter of potential use to the insurgents was destroyed, in effect being a variation of scorched earth tactics. Any persons seen intruding in these areas were liable to being shot by the military (hence the name).

Much fertile farmland was thus made unavailable due to the free-fire zones. In certain areas, farming was permitted under armed escort, but productivity nevertheless remained low, as the escort timetable rarely was suitable for the farms. The areas to which people were displaces often had soils unsuitable for traditional farming methods, or were already owned by locals or large European land-owners. This led to wheat and barley production falling by three-quarters from 1954 to 1960, and livestock output declined similarly.

=== Regroupment centres ===
After the establishment of the free-fire zones, locals were then relocated to the so-called regroupment centres (French: camps de regroupement). First experimented with in the Aures in 1955, they had become a common sight by 1957. Two categories of centres were established: temporary and permanent. The former were destroyed after the local population had been relocated, while the latter functioned more like urban centres.

=== Challe Line ===
The construction of the Challe Line (which included barbed wire, land mines and electric fences), caused the deaths of several Algerians trying to cross it, which gave it the nickname of the "Death Line" or the "Cursed Line" among many inhabitants of Remila.

== See also ==
- First Indochina War – widely inspired Algerians to seek independence
- Counterinsurgency
- French colonial empire

== Bibliography ==
- Evans, Martin (2012). Algeria: France's Undeclared War. Oxford University Press. ISBN 978-0-19-280350-4.
- Field, Michael (1994). Inside the Arab World. Harvard University Press. ISBN 9780674455214.
- McDougall, James (2017). A History of Algeria. Cambridge University Press. ISBN 978-0-521-85164-0.
- Horne, Alistair (2006). A Savage War Of Peace: Algeria 1954-1962. NYRB Classics. ISBN 978-1590172186.
- Johnson, Jennifer (2016). The Battle for Algeria: Sovereignty, Health Care and Humanitarianism. University of Philadelphia Press. ISBN 978-0-8122-4771-8.
- Sutton, Keith (1977). "Population Resettlement — Traumatic Upheavals and the Algerian Experience". The Journal of Modern African Studies. 15 (2): 279–300. doi:10.1017/S0022278X00053945.
- Vince, Natalya (2020). The Algerian War, the Algerian Revolution. Springer Nature Switzerland AG. ISBN 978-3-030-54263-4.
- Windrow, Martin (1997). The Algerian War 1954-1962. Reed Books. ISBN 1855326582.
