= Challe Line =

1958 defense line in French Algeria

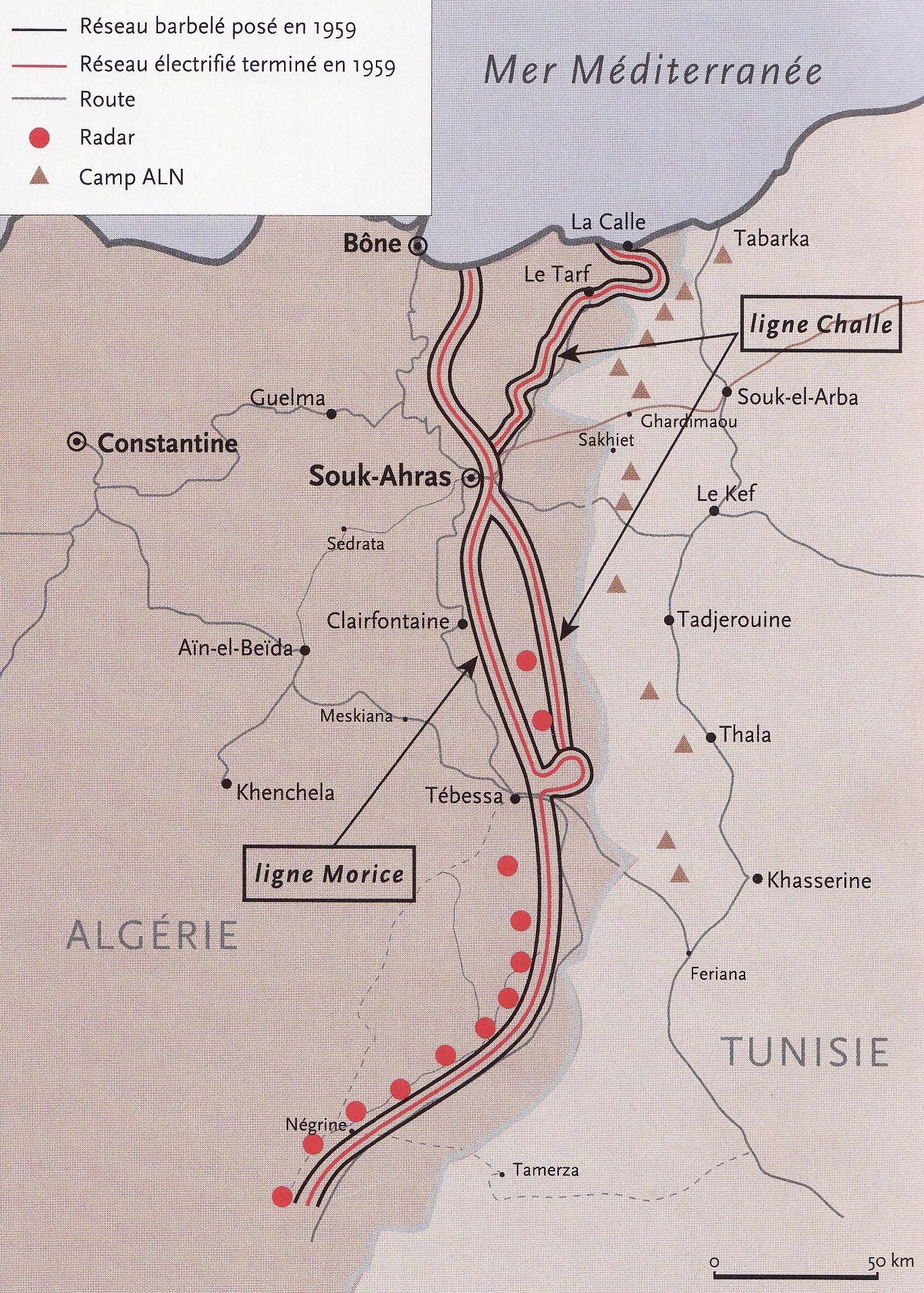
Map showing Challe and Morice lines on the Algerian-Tunisian border.

The Challe Line (French: ligne Challe) was an armed defense line in French Algeria located on the border between Algeria and Tunisia. The Morice Line was built in July 1957, with the Challe Line being built in May 1958 as a second defensive barrier. The defense line had barbed wire, land mines and electric fences. It was also constantly monitored. The line's name comes from General Maurice Challe, commander-in-chief in Algeria between December 1958 and March 1960. The lines crossed the provinces of El Taref and Souk Ahras to reach the two communes of El Kouif and Negrine in the province of Tébessa. The Morice Line stretched from Annaba to Negrine via Souk Ahras and the communes of El Ma Labiodh and Bir el-Ater in Tébessa province.

Several hundred thousand mines remained unexploded for more than 50 years. Anti-personnel mines also claimed victims in the decades following Algeria's independence.

The end of the demining operations in Algeria were finished many decades later and was announced fully finished in 2017. Although some isolated mines can still be discovered outside known mined areas.

== See also ==
- Algerian War of Independence
- Maurice Challe
- Plan Challe
- Morice Line
