= List of French political eras =

List of Monarchies, Empires and Republic of France, sandbox test

List of French political eras from the 15th Century (1498) to 21st Century (present day)

- Valois-Orléans kings, 1498–1515
- Valois-Angoulême kings, 1515–1589
- Bourbon kings, 1589–1792
- French Revolution, 1789–1799
- Kingdom of France, 1791-1792
- French First Republic, 1792-1804
- First French Empire, 1804-1814
- Bourbon Restoration, 1814–1830
- Kingdom of France 1830–1848
- French Second Republic, 1848-1852
- Second French Empire, 1852-1870
- French Third Republic, 1870-1940
  - Interwar period, 1919–1939
  - Années folles, 1920–1929
  - Free France - Vichy France, 1940–1944
- Provisional Republic, 1944–1946
- French Fourth Republic, 1946-1958
- French Fifth Republic, 1958–present

== See also ==
- History of France
