= Blum cabinet =

Léon Blum (1872 – 1950) was President of the Council of three Governments of France:

- First ministry (4 June 1936 – 22 June 1937)
- Second ministry (13 March – 10 April 1938)
- Third ministry (16 December 1946 – 22 January 1947)

== See also ==
- History of France (1900–present)
- Interwar period#French Empire
