= Nicot =

Nicot is a French surname. Notable people with the surname include:

- Adriano Nicot (born 1964), Cuban Neoexpressionist painter of French descendance
- Emmanuelle Nicot (born 1985), French filmmaker and screenwriter
- Jean Nicot (1530–1600), French diplomat and scholar
- Jean-Louis Nicot (1911–2004), commander of the French Air transport fleet during the First Indochina War
- Juan Mercado-Nicot (27 August 1862 - 25 January 1954), son of Jose Antonio Mercado and Ramona Nicot
- Ramona Nicot (Abt. 1827 - 13 July 1909), daughter of Francisco Nicot and Maria Francisca Bernazar

== See also ==
- New International Commentary on the Old Testament, abbreviated as NICOT
