= René Floriot =

French lawyer

René Edmond Floriot (French: [ʁəne flɔʁjo]; 20 October 1902, Paris – 22 December 1975, Neuilly-sur-Seine) was a French lawyer.

== Life ==
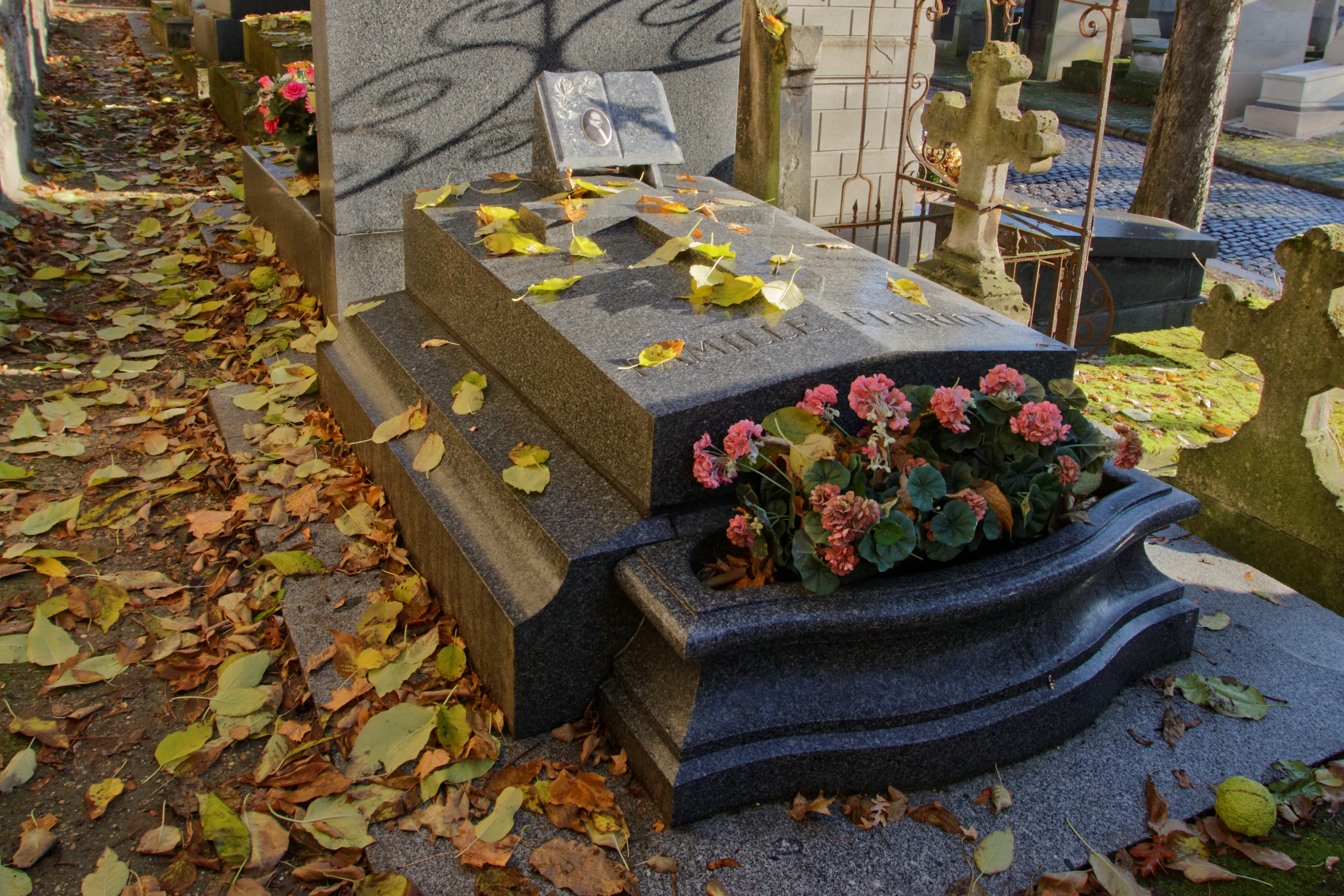
Père-Lachaise Cemetery

"Son of a Paris municipal clerk, Floriot studied law at the Sorbonne, started practicing before his 21st birthday. In the 1930s, he prospered by winning divorces for the wealthy in a week, though the cumbersome process usually takes two to three years in France. After the war, he unabashedly defended war criminals and collaborators."

Floriot drove "a research staff of six lawyers, known as "l'usine Floriot" (the Floriot factory). Gifted with prodigious memory, he can simplify the most complex case for the dullest of jurors. While other French lawyers deliver elegantly vague speeches to nodding, berobed judges, Floriot deals in facts, not forensic flourishes. In a profession heavily weighted toward lawyers with social standing, Floriot has succeeded entirely on drive and shrewdness."

Floriot became "one of the best and most expensive of Parisian criminal lawyers".

Later he participated in some film productions.

== People defended by Floriot ==
=== Otto Abetz ===
Floriot "saved Otto Abetz, the hated Nazi German ambassador to Vichy France, from execution; Abetz received 20 years imprisonment, was later freed, and died in a car accident."

=== Marcel Petiot ===
"Floriot also defended Dr. Marcel Petiot who, between 1942 and 1944, lured 63 Jewish refugees to his Paris house with promises of help, and was accused of robbing and killing at least 27 of them. Floriot proved that three or more of the alleged victims were German agents and that some of them were still alive. But though Floriot won professional respect for his tenacious defense, Petiot went to the guillotine. Floriot went too—in France, the lawyer traditionally takes the last walk with his client."

=== Onassis-Latopadis lawsuit ===
Floriot was also involved in the "Onassis-Latopadis" lawsuit.

=== Pierre Jaccoud ===
"In his most spectacular murder trial (1960), Floriot defended Swiss Lawyer-Politician Pierre Jaccoud, onetime dean of the Geneva bar. Police had the murder weapon; witnesses insisted that Jaccoud had shot and stabbed the father of a man who had stolen his mistress. But Floriot harried the witnesses into damaging concessions about the murder weapon, wrung lurid testimony from the mistress. He airily dismissed Jaccoud's lack of alibi: "Only criminals have alibis. Intelligent people never remember how they spend their evenings." Jaccoud got seven years."

=== Gustave Mentré ===
In 1961, Floriot "braved President de Gaulle's wrath in winning a suspended sentence for General Gustave Mentré, an accused conspirator in the Algiers coup."

=== Ben Barka case ===
Floriot defended two detectives implicated in the kidnap-murder of Moroccan political opponent Ben Barka; one was acquitted, the other got six years.

=== Moise Tshombe ===
Aerial hijackers delivered Moise Tshombe to an Algerian jail in July 1967. His wife turned to "one of the few men who might have saved her husband from extradition to the Congo—and almost certain death. Parisian Lawyer René Edmond Floriot, 64, faced appalling odds: the Congolese had already convicted Tshombe of not only treason but also murder and robbery. With eloquence, Floriot contended that the Congolese had amnestied Tshombe last fall." But last week" of July 1967 he lost.
Though Tshombe could not be extradited for purely political reasons, ruled the Algerian Supreme Court, "Algerian justice does not shield murder and robbery." If President Houari Boumediene ratifies the Court's decision Tshombe must go home—presumably to his doom. For the best-known avocat in the French-speaking world, it was a rare, bitter defeat. In 20,000 cases, Floriot has lost only two clients to the guillotine and about ten to the firing squad."

Eventually, the Algerian authorities delayed Tshombe's extradition and he died in Algiers, while under house arrest, in 1969.

== Honors and awards ==
- Commander of the Order of Legion of Honour

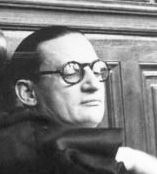
René Floriot at the trial of Marcel Petiot.

== Publications ==
- Floriot, René Edmond (1968): Les Erreurs Judiciaires
