= Jean-Louis Nicot =

French Air Force general

Jean-Louis Nicot (14 February 1911, in Paris – 29 August 2004) was a French Air Force general. He was the commander of the French Air transport fleet during the First Indochina War. He was later sent to prison for his involvement in the Algiers putsch, before being amnestied.

== Biography ==
Nicot graduated from the École Spéciale Militaire de Saint-Cyr and entered the French Air Force. He moved up through the ranks until he reached lieutenant-general, serving as second-in-command of the Air Force.

In Indochina he was head of the French Air Transport Command. He was tasked with keeping Dien Bien Phu supplied by air when it was besieged by the Viet Minh. The siege was lost when the garrison could not be supplied by air.

He was later promoted to Deputy Chief of Staff of the Air Force. When the Algiers putsch occurred on 23 April 1961. Nicot was found to have been involved in delaying the transmission of certain orders at the time of the French counter-attack, as well as aiding in the secret transfer of Generals Maurice Challe and André Zeller to Algeria.

General Nicot was tried by the High Military Court and convicted on 19 June 1961, for collusion "with the leaders of an insurrectionist movement." He was sentenced to twelve years in prison, eight less than the prosecution's requested twenty years.

Nicot was released from prison in 1965, and later reinstated to the Air Force Reserves in November 1982, following the adoption of a bill by the French legislature "relating to the settlement of certain consequences of the events of North Africa", whose goal was to reinstate 800 officers, 800 policemen and 400 civil administrators expelled between 1961 and 1963 into public office, except for the eight putschist generals expelled from the reserves.

General Nicot accumulated 4,500 hours of flight time during his career.

== Decorations ==
- Grand Officer of the Légion d'honneur ("Legion of Honour")
- Ten citations, with nine on order of the army
- Distinguished Flying Cross (UK)
