= Bigeard cap =

French army field cap

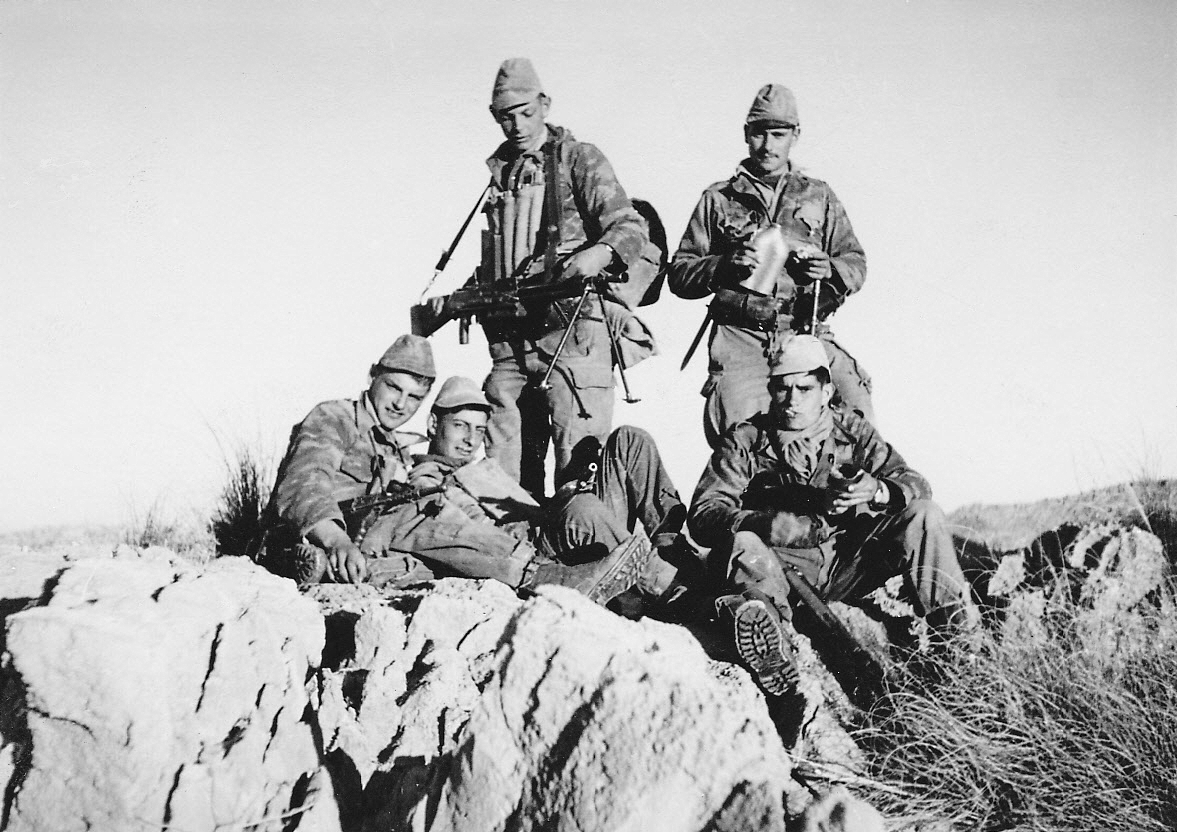
French Commandos de Chasse wearing Bigeard caps.

The Bigeard cap (French: casquette Bigeard) is a field cap worn by the French Army and several others. It was allegedly invented by French General Marcel Bigeard to replace the colorful and less practical colored side cap worn by the French Army in First Indochina War.

== Overview ==
The Bigeard is a cloth field cap with a short cloth peak. Originally produced in lizard, it was later produced in olive green and various camouflage patterns to include, forest, and desert. The cap is more of a peaked sidecap and is available with or without neck flaps for sun protection.

== Users ==
Several armies have copied the design, Rhodesian army as the "swallowtail cap" in English or "Quico" (pronounced kiko) in Portuguese vertical lizard

== Gallery ==
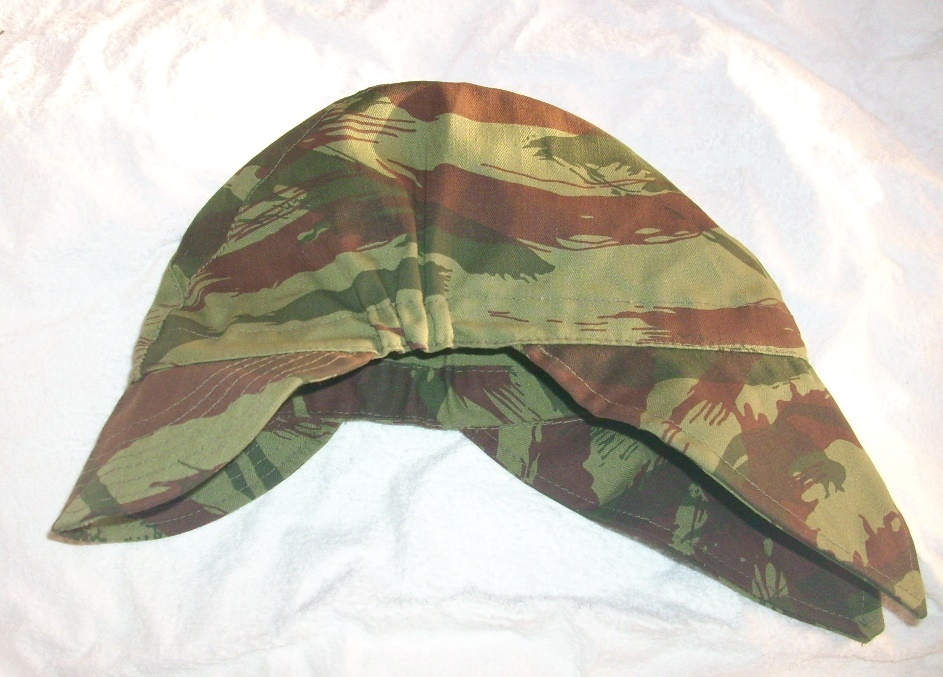
Portuguese "Quico" variant

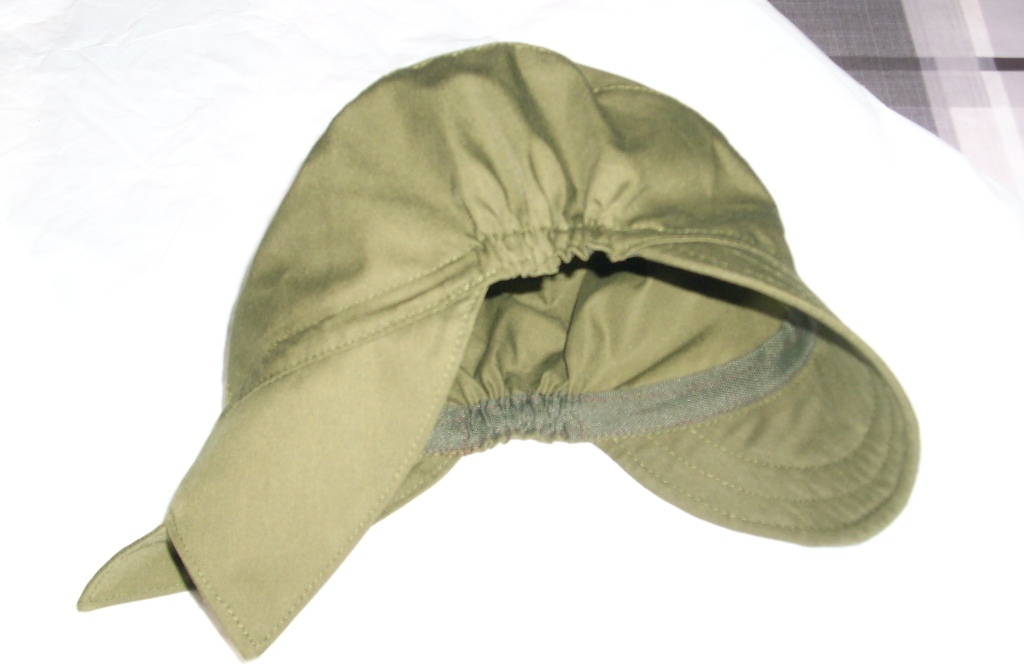
Olive Bigeard

== See also ==
- Patrol cap
- Sen bou The former Imperial Japanese Army's field cap with which the Bigeard is similar to in form and function.
