= Paul Stehlin =

French politician (1907–1975)

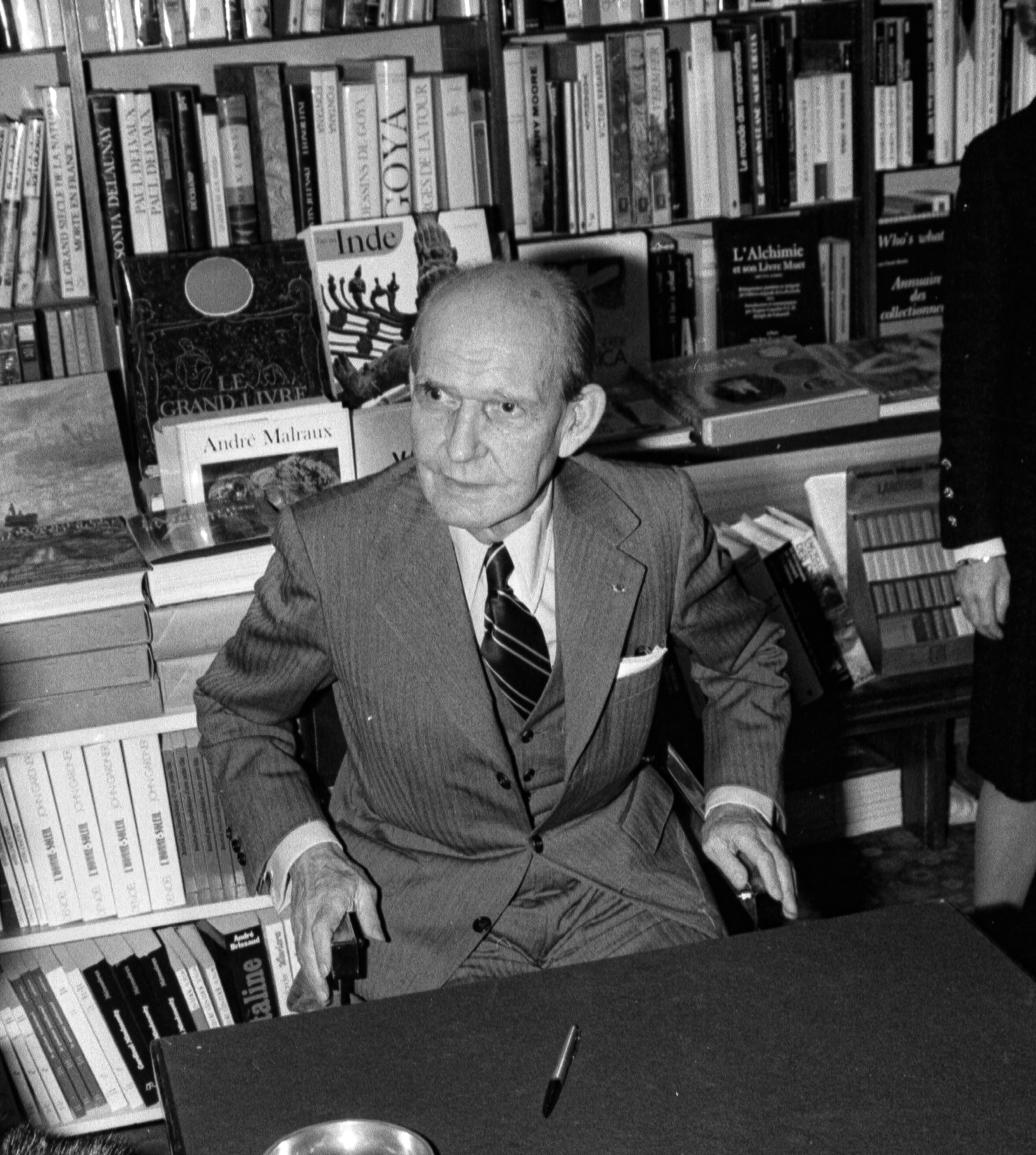
Général Paul Stehlin en Mars 1975

Paul Marie Victor Stehlin (11 August 1907 – 22 June 1975) was a French general and politician.

== Military career ==
Born in Hochfelden, Bas-Rhin, Stehlin spoke fluent German. He graduated from the French military academy in 1928.

He was deputy air attaché in Berlin from 1935 to 1939, and took part in the Munich Conference.

In the Second World War, he took part in the Norwegian campaign in 1940 and then commanded the III/6 Roussillon Fighter Group.

He was captured by Nazi Germany in 1941, but escaped to Africa. Initially stationed in Dakar (Fighter Group I/4), he then participated in the Anglo-American landing in North Africa and was liaison officer with the Allied air forces for General de Gaulle.

Promoted to colonel in 1946, he was military attaché in London from 1947 to 1950. He was promoted to Air Brigadier General in 1950, and was, from 1952 to 1954, deputy chief of staff to René Pleven, Minister of National Defence. From 1954 to 1956, he was deputy head of the French delegation to the NATO standing group in Washington. Promoted to air division general in 1956, he became commander of the First Tactical Air Command and of the French Air Force in West Germany. In 1958, he became, for a short period, deputy of the IV Allied Tactical Air Force. In 1959, he was appointed major general of the armed forces. In 1960, after being promoted to the rank of air force general, he succeeded Edmond Jouhaud as chief of staff of the air force.

== Business and political career ==
Stehlin retired from the military on grounds of age in September 1963. He wrote his memoirs, Testimony for History, which won the Ambassadors' Prize. He also wrote a book criticising the French nuclear capability.

He became Vice President of Europe for Hughes Aircraft (1964), Vice President of Bugatti (1965) and Chairman and CEO of Algeco (1968).

In 1968, he was elected to the National Assembly for Paris's 21st constituency, representing Progress and Modern Democracy. He was reelected in 1973 for the Social Democratic Reformers.

In 1974 he published a memorandum to the French president, advocating American fighter jets over French. This caused a scandal and was debated in the national assembly. On 6 June 1975, a United States Senate subcommittee revealed that Northrop Corporation had made "dubious" payments to European parliamentarians and former high-ranking officers, including Paul Stehlin, who had been paid as a "consultant" since 1964. The same day, Stehlin was knocked down by a bus in Paris. He died of his injuries on 22 June 1975.

== Personal life ==
He married Anne-Marie Schwob in 1951. They had one son, Marc.

== Honours ==
- Grand Cross of the Legion of Honor
- War Cross 1939–1945
- Medal of Aeronautics
- Commander of the Order of Alaouite Ouissam

== Books ==
- Testimony for History, Robert Laffont, 1964
- Back to Zero, Robert Laffont, 1968
- The Force of Illusion, Robert Laffont, 1973 (ISBN 978-2221039298)
- France Disarmed, Calmann Levy, 1974

Military offices
Preceded by Edmond Jouhaud	Chief of Staff of the French Air Force; 15 March 1960 – 1 October 1963	Succeeded by André Martin
