= Paris's 21st constituency (1958–1986) =

Map of Paris constituencies in 1981.

Paris's 21st constituency was one of the French National Assembly constituencies for the city of Paris in the period 1958 to 1986. When it was created it was one of the 55 constituencies in the Seine department (31 for the city of Paris, 24 for its banlieues); from 1968 it was part of the Paris department.

It was represented by Henri Karcher, Bernard Lepeu, Paul Stehlin, and Gilbert Gantier.

The constituency was abolished for the 1986 election, which used proportional representation. The 1986 redistricting of French legislative constituencies subsequently created 21 new constituencies of Paris, however with different boundaries. The 1988–2012 21st constituency is on the East of the city.

== See also ==
- List of constituencies of the National Assembly of France
