= Pierre-Marie Bigot =

Pierre-Marie Bigot (French: [pjɛʁ maʁi biɡo]; 22 December 1909 – 11 January 2008) was a French Air Force general. He was dismissed from the Air Force and sentenced to 15 years' imprisonment for taking part in the Algiers putsch of 1961. Freed in 1965, he was reinstated in his rank by the 1982 amnesty law.
