= History of France (1900–present) =

The history of France from 1900 to the present includes:

- the later years of the Third Republic (1870–1940)

- World War I (1914–1918)
- Interwar Period (1918–1939)
- World War II (1939–1945)

- the Fourth Republic (1946–1958)
- the Fifth Republic (since 1958)

== Geography ==
In 1914, the territory of France was different from today's France in two important ways: most of Alsace and the northeastern part of Lorraine had been annexed by Germany in 1870 (following the Franco-Prussian War of 1870–1871), and the North African country of Algeria had been established as an integral part of France (department) in 1848. Alsace-Lorraine would be restored at the end of World War I (only to be lost again, temporarily, to the Germans a second time during World War II).

== Demographics ==
Unlike other European countries France did not experience a strong population growth in the mid-to-late 19th century and first half of the 20th century. That would be compounded by the massive French losses of World War I, roughly estimated at 1.4 million French dead including civilians (or nearly 10% of the active adult male population) and four times as many wounded — and World War II, estimated at 593,000 French dead (one-and-a-half times the number of American dead), of which 470,000 were civilians. From a population of around 39 million in 1880, France still had only a population of 40 million in 1945. The post-war years would bring a massive "baby boom", and with immigration, France reached 50 million in 1968. This growth slowed down in 1974.

Since 1999, France has seen an unprecedented growth in population. In 2004, population growth was 0.68% and almost reached North American levels (2004 was the year with the highest increase in French population since 1974). France is now well ahead of all other European countries in population growth (except for the Republic of Ireland) and in 2003, France's natural population growth (excluding immigration) was responsible for almost all the natural growth in European population (the population of the European Union increased by 216,000 inhabitants (without immigration), of which 211,000 was the increase in France's population alone, and 5,000 was the increase in all the other countries EU combined).

Today, France, with a population of 65.5 million, or 68 million including overseas territories, is the third most populous country of Europe, behind Russia and Germany.

Immigration in the 20th century differed significantly from that of the previous century. The 1920s saw great influxes from Italy and Poland; in the 1930-50s immigrants came from Spain and Portugal. Since the 1960s however, the greatest waves of immigrants have been from former French colonies: Algeria (1 million), Morocco (570,000), Tunisia (200,000), Senegal (45,000), Mali (40,000), Cambodia (45,000), Laos (30,000), Vietnam (35,000). Much of this recent immigration was initially economical, but many of these immigrants have remained in France, gained citizenship and integrated into French society. Estimates vary, but of the 60 million people living in France today, close to 4 million claim foreign origin. This massive influx has created tensions in contemporary France, especially over issues of "integration into French society" and the notion of a "French identity", and in recent years the most controversial issues have been with regards to Muslim populations (at 7%, Islam is the second largest religion in today's France; see Islam in France).

Eastern-European and North-African Jewish immigration to France largely began in the mid to late 19th century. In 1872, there were an estimated 86,000 Jews living in France, and by 1945 this increased to 300,000. Many Jews integrated (or attempted to integrate) into French society, although French nationalism led to antisemitism in many quarters. The Vichy regime's collaboration with the Nazi Holocaust led to the extermination of 76,000 French Jews (the Vichy authorities however gave preferential treatment to "integrated" Jews who had been in France from two to five generations and who had fought in World War I or held important administrative positions in the government), and of all other Western European countries, this figure is second only to Germany; but many Jews were also saved by acts of heroism and administrative refusal to participate in the deportation (three quarters of France's Jewish population was spared, a higher proportion than any other European country touched by the holocaust). Since the 1960s, France has experienced a great deal of Jewish immigration from the Mediterranean and North Africa, and the Jewish population in France is estimated at around 600,000 today.

Around the start of the 20th century, almost half of all Frenchmen depended on the land for their living, and up until World War II, France remained a largely rural country (roughly 25% of the population worked on the land in 1950), but the post-war years also saw an unprecedented move to the cities: only around 4% of the French continue to work in farms and 73% live today in large cities. By far the largest of these is Paris, at 2.1 million inhabitants (11 million in the Parisian region), followed by Lille, Lyon, Marseille (upwards of 1.2 million inhabitants each). Much of this urbanization takes place not in the traditional center of the cities, but in the suburbs (or "banlieues") that surround them (the cement and steel housing projects in these areas are called "cités"). With immigration from poorer countries, these "cités" have been the center of racial and class tensions since the 1960s.

== French identity ==
The loss of regional and traditional culture (language and accent, local customs in dress and food), the poverty of many rural regions and the rise of modern urban structures (housing projects, supermarkets) have created tensions in modern France between traditionalists and progressives. Compounding the loss of regionalism is the role of the French capital and the centralized French State.

Independence movements sprang up in Brittany, Corsica and the Basque regions, and the Vichy Regime (echoing Nazi racial propaganda) actively encouraged Catholicism and local "folk" traditions, which they saw as truer foundations for the French nation.

The post-war years saw the state take control of a number of French industries. The modern political climate has however been for increasing regional power ("decentralization") and for reduced state control in private enterprise ("privatization").

It can be assumed that “The First World War initiated a period of sudden, often traumatic transformation. It accelerated changes that had slowly begun to alter French cultural, social, and economic life in the first decades of the twentieth century.” French identity and culture had been completely disheveled after World War I, and that destruction is in part caused by gender-ambiguity. French culture and identity were heavily based on societal gender roles that seemed to have been blurred after the war. Perhaps the “most famous expression of this postwar sense of cultural mortality” came from a 1919 letter by Paul Valery, which discussed that “We modern civilizations, we too now know that we are mortal like the others."

== Feminist movement ==
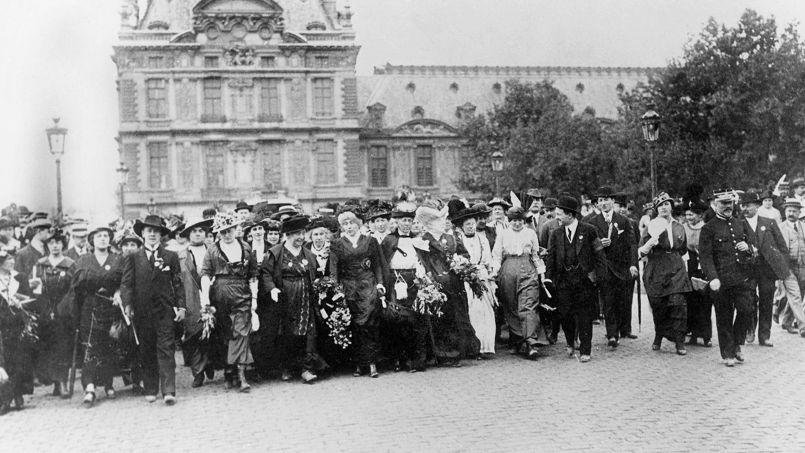
Women demonstrate for suffrage in Paris, 1914

After World War I, when it had lost 1.4 million of its citizens to World War I, France was facing a serious issue. With a casualty rate higher than any other country in Europe at 16.5 percent, along with 3 million wounded and 1.1 million suffering from permanent disability, France was suffering from a low birthrate. At the same time, France was painting a fearful picture of women no longer wanting to have children. Because of the flagging birthrate, legislators introduced and passed a bill on July 23, 1920, which penalized the use of propaganda that encouraged and supported abortion and contraceptives. Historians believe that the legislative victory can be interpreted as either a “logical gesture of the postwar conservative, nationalist Block national that came into power in the November legislative elections of 1919,” or they saw the natalist victory as “a response to an already serious demographic problem made worse by wartime casualties.” Prior to World War I, until 1914, abortions were “frequent and virtually unpunished, though outlawed by Article 317 of the Penal Code.” Feminists like Madeleine Pelletier, a female physician and socialist thinker, “developed socio-economic pro-abortion arguments which were already well known to the intellectual working class. Natalists that had pushed this legislation as well as further restrictions against a women’s right not to bear children, as Pelletier observes, “was presented as a class position.” Legislation like this represented the interest of those with a high socio-economic status that “used the working class as a pool of labour to bolster the economy." Throughout the first couple decades of the 20th century, there is a noticeable clash between French feminists, who more aligned with the socialist parties of France, and the natalists, who resonated more with the conservative parties of France.

== Historical overview ==
=== Coming of World War I 1900–1914 ===
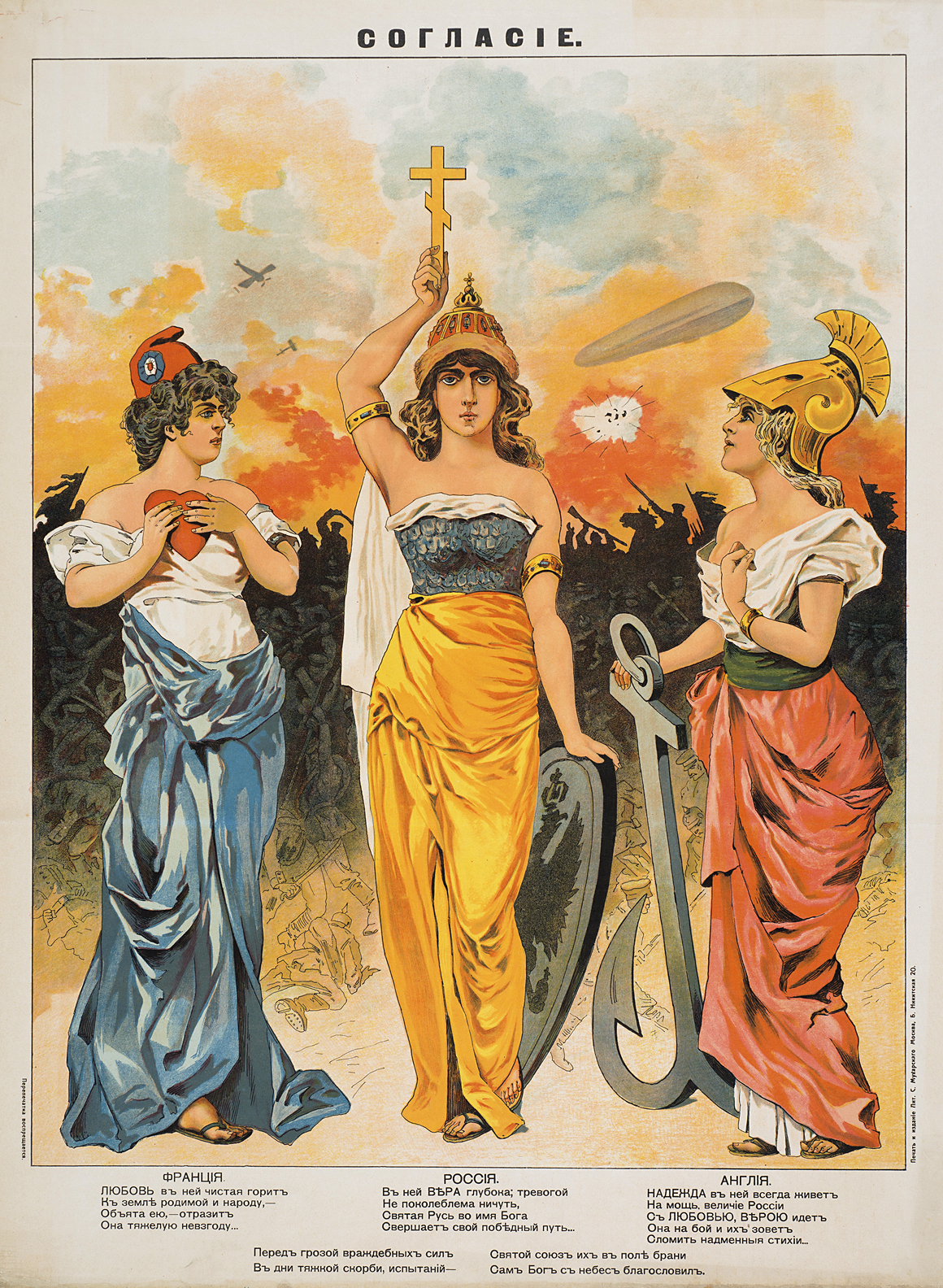
Marianne (left), Mother Russia (centre) and Britannia (right) personifying the Triple Entente as opposed to the Triple Alliance

In an effort to isolate Germany, France successfully formed alliances with Russia and Great Britain. First came the Franco-Russian Alliance of 1894, then the 1904 Entente Cordiale with Great Britain, and finally the Anglo-Russian Entente in 1907 which became the Triple Entente. This alliance with Britain and Russia against Germany and Austria in 1914 led Russia, Britain, and France to enter World War I as Allies. Military leaders in Berlin planned to defeat first France, then Russia.

Paris feared the German military power (Imperial German Army, Imperial German Navy, Luftstreitkräfte and Feldluftschiffer). The Franco-Russian Alliance of 1894 served as the cornerstone of French foreign policy until 1917, in the expectation that Germany would avoid a two-front war. A further link with Russia was provided by vast French investments and loans before 1914. In 1904, French foreign minister Théophile Delcassé negotiated the Entente Cordiale with Lord Lansdowne, the British Foreign Secretary, an agreement that ended a long period of Anglo-French tensions and hostility. The Entente Cordiale, which functioned as an informal Anglo-French alliance, was further strengthened by the First and Second Moroccan crises of 1905 and 1911, and by secret military and naval staff talks. Delcassé's rapprochement with Britain was controversial in France as Anglophobia was prominent around the start of the 20th century, sentiments that had been much reinforced by the Fashoda Incident of 1898, in which Britain and France had almost gone to war, and by the Boer War, in which French public opinion was very much on the side of Britain's enemies. Ultimately, the fear of German power was the link that bound Britain and France together.

Preoccupied with internal problems, France paid little attention to foreign policy in the period between late 1912 and mid-1914 (→ 1913 in France, 1914 in France), although it did extend military service to three years from two over strong Socialist objections in 1913. The rapidly escalating Balkan crisis of July 1914 surprised France, and not much attention was given to conditions that led to the outbreak of World War I. Paris was caught by surprise when the German army suddenly invaded and plunged toward Paris. However London decided that France must be aided or Germany would be far too powerful, and so it declared war on Germany.

=== World War I (1914–1918) ===
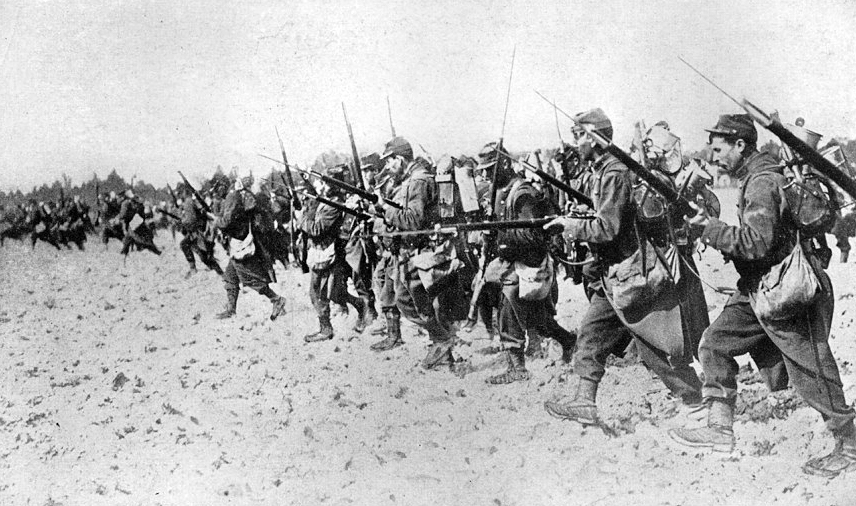
A practice French bayonet charge in 1913. In 1914 it proved highly vulnerable to German machine guns and artillery.

Many French intellectuals welcomed the war to avenge the humiliation of defeat and loss of territory to Germany following the Franco-Prussian War of 1871. After Socialist leader Jean Jaurès, a pacifist, was assassinated at the start of the war, the French socialist movement abandoned its antimilitarist positions and joined the national war effort. Prime Minister Rene Viviani called for unity—for a "Union sacrée" ("Sacred Union")—ending the feud between the right and left factions that had been fighting bitterly. France had few dissenters. However, by 1917 war-weariness was a major factor, seriously weakening the willingness of the Army to take the offensive. Soldiers said that instead of attacking it was best to wait for the arrival of millions of Americans. The soldiers were protesting not just the futility of frontal assaults in the face of German machine guns but also degraded conditions at the front lines and at home, especially infrequent leaves, poor food, the use of African and Asian colonials on the home front, and concerns about the welfare of their wives and children.

The economy was hurt by the German invasion of major industrial areas in the northeast. This occupied area, in 1913, had produced 58% of the steel, and 40% of the coal. Considerable relief came with the influx of American food, money and raw materials in 1917.

Georges Clemenceau became prime minister in November 1917, a time of defeatism and acrimony. Italy was on the defensive, and Russia had surrendered. Civilians were angry as rations fell short and the threat of German air raids grew. Clemenceau realized his first priority was to restore civilian morale. He arrested Joseph Caillaux, a former French prime minister, for openly advocating peace negotiations. He won all-party support to fight to victory calling for "la guerre jusqu'au bout" (war until the end).

The war brought great losses of manpower and resources. Fought in large part on French soil, it led to approximately 1.4 million French dead including civilians (see World War I casualties), and four times as many wounded. France borrowed billions of dollars from the U.S. that it had to repay. The stipulations of the Treaty of Versailles (1919) were favourable: Alsace and Lorraine were returned to France; Germany was required to take full responsibility for the war and to pay war reparations to France that covered its entire war costs, including veterans' benefits. One German industrial area, Saar Basin, a coal and steel region, was temporarily occupied by France.

=== Homefront (1914–1919) ===
A dichotomy between the two sexes, that had once already been defined, was becoming inflamed. While the majority of men were sent off into the warfront, the majority of women stayed at the homefront. Because 3.7 million men had left work to serve away from home, women had many new job opportunities. Some quit their old 'feminine' jobs to take on these more masculine tasks, fulfilling the occupational and family roles that men previously filled. Men in uniform were not pleased. When it comes to viewing the "material contrasts between trench and civilian life, returning soldiers saw the homefront as a world of extravagance and luxury, whose pleasures they were largely denied." Soldiers returning home soon became lost in a perpetual and mental "no-man's-land." They had come home and witnessed women taking on their jobs, their family responsibilities, they felt stranded in that no-man’s-land. Veterans had felt forgotten. The fact that the women on the homefront had "collapsed conventional notions of sexual difference and reversed the boundaries of social marginality," women had "become the new insiders," while the men were left on the cascades of civilization. The way in which civilians passed time had "shocked and offended" these soldiers. The contrast between homefront and warfront life was vast. Historian Mary Louise Robert argues that "women's lack of knowledge concerning the war can be ascribed to government censorship rather than to a "demoralization" of the homefront." She writes that the censorship suppressed news of military defeats and the horrors of the trenches.

=== Between the wars (1919–1939) ===
In 1920, the socialist party (SFIO) was split in two and the majority broke away and formed the French Communist Party (Section française de l'internationale communiste). The remaining minority, led by Léon Blum, "kept the old house" and stayed in the SFIO. In 1924 and again in 1932, the Socialists joined with the Radical-Socialist Party in the "Coalitions of the Left" (Cartels des Gauches), but refused actually to join the non-Socialist governments led by the Radicals Édouard Herriot and Édouard Daladier. Daladier resigned under pressure of the far-right leagues after the 6 February 1934 crisis, and conservative Gaston Doumergue was appointed president of the Council. The left-wing had feared a right-wing coup d'état as those that had taken place with the 1922 March on Rome and events in Germany. Therefore, under the Comintern's influence, the Communists changed their line and adopted an "antifascist union" line, which led to the Popular Front (1936–38), which won the 1936 elections and brought Blum to power as France's first socialist prime minister. The Popular Front was composed of radicals and socialists, while the communists supported it without participating in it (in much the same way that socialists had supported radicals' governments before World War I without participating in them). Within a year, however, Léon Blum's government collapsed over economic policy, opposition from the elite (the famous "200 hundreds families") and also over the issue of the Spanish Civil War Blum decided that supporting the Spanish Republicans might lead to civil war inside France. His decision led to huge defections among the French left-wing, while Adolf Hitler and Benito Mussolini unashamedly armed and supported Francisco Franco's troops.

The French far-right expanded greatly and theories of race and antisemitism proliferated in many quarters. Numerous far-right and anti-parliamentarian leagues, similar to the fascist leagues, sprang up, including colonel de la Rocque's Croix-de-Feu 1927-1936 which, like its larger rival the monarchist Action Française (founded in 1898, condemned by Pope Pius XI in 1926, Action Française supported a restoration of the monarchy and of Roman Catholicism as the state religion) advocated national integralism (the belief that society is an organic unity) and organized popular demonstrations in reaction to the Stavisky Affair 1934, hoping to overthrow the government (see 6 February 1934 crisis).

In the 1920s, France established an elaborate system of border defenses (the Maginot Line) and alliances (see Little Entente) to offset resurgent German strength. In the 1930s, the massive losses of the war led many in France to choose the popular appeasement policy that prevented war with Germany over Czechoslovakia, whose alliance with France proved worthless at the Munich Agreement of 1938.

=== Great Depression ===
The crisis hit France's economy in 1931, a bit later than other countries. While during the 1920s it grew at the very strong rate of 4.43% per year, in the 1930s it fell to an average of only 0.63%. Despite the enormous disruption to the economy caused by the Great War, by 1924 industrial and agricultural production had been restored to prewar levels, with rapid and widespread growth from 1924 to 1931.

France tried vigorously but without much success to obtain the reparations Germany had been forced to promise at the Treaty of Versailles. This led France to invade and occupy the Ruhr industrial district of Germany. That failed. Finally, all the major nations agreed to accept the proposals, known as the Dawes Plan of 1924 and the Young Plan of 1929, to stabilize reparation payments. Germany was virtually bankrupt by 1931, and all payments were suspended.

After 1931 rising unemployment and political unrest led to the February 6, 1934 riots. The left banded together and formed the Popular Front, led by SFIO socialist leader Léon Blum, which won the elections in 1936. Ultra-nationalist groups also saw increased popularity, although democracy prevailed until 1940. Economic conditions did not significantly improve, even as the Popular Front reduced the work week to 40 hours. Fearful of a civil war in France, as was happening in Spain, France led the major nations to call an arms blockade designed to prevent arms shipments to either side during the Spanish Civil War. This effort nonetheless failed to stop arms shipments from Germany, Italy and the Soviet Union.

=== World War II (1939–1945) ===
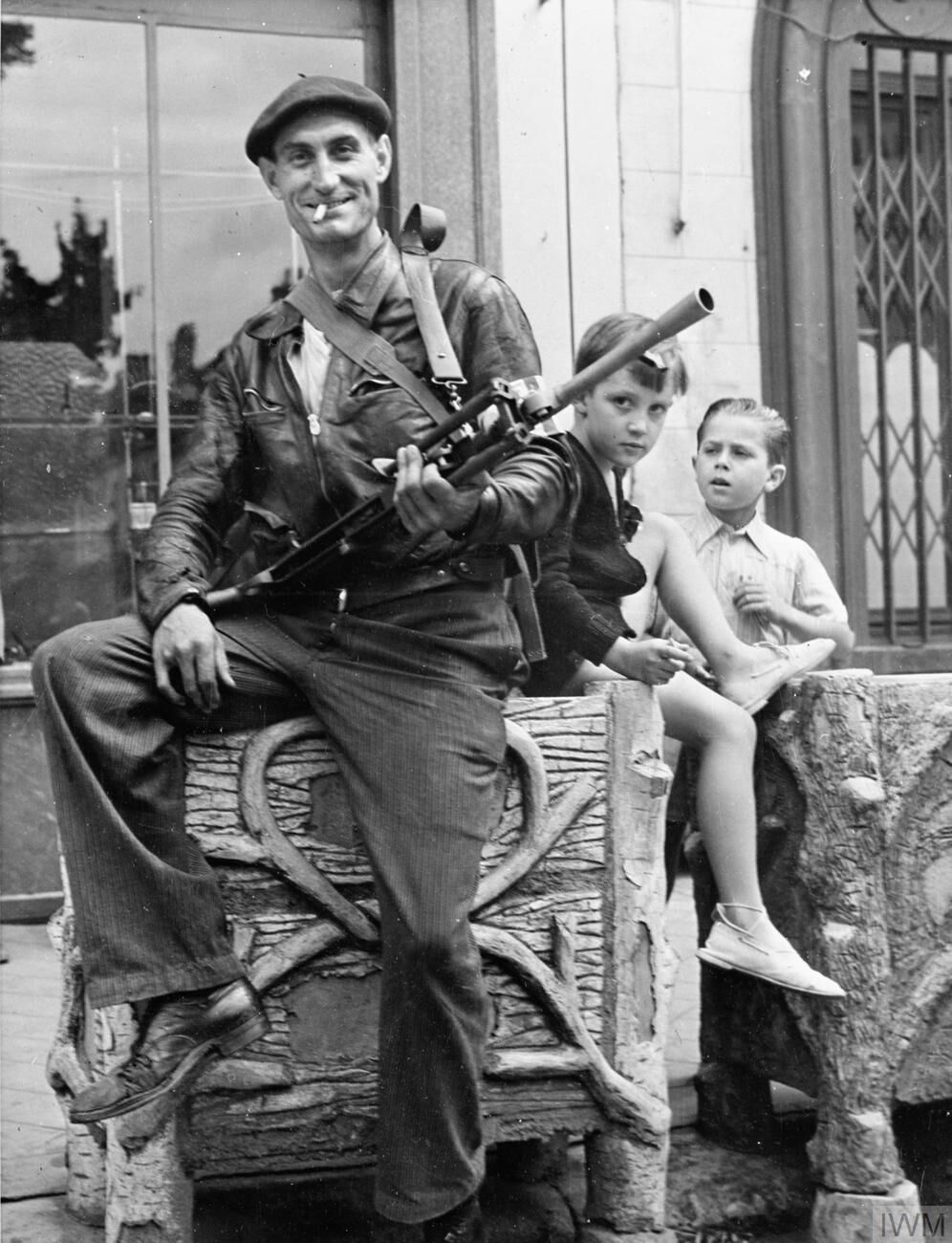
A member of the French Forces of the Interior poses in Châteaudun, 1944

In September 1939 Hitler invaded Poland, and France and Great Britain declared war. Both sides built up forces along to the Western Front, but for the next eight months neither side made a move: this was the "phony war". The German Blitzkrieg began in May 1940, and in six weeks of retreating the French lost 130,000 men. The Allied armies crumbled, but the British managed to rescue their own soldiers and about 100,000 French soldiers in the Dunkirk evacuation.

France was defeated and had to sign an armistice with Nazi Germany on June 22, 1940. French soldiers became prisoners of war in Germany, were assigned to munitions factories as forced labor, and served as hostages. Nazi Germany occupied three fifths of France's territory (the Atlantic seaboard and most of France north of the Loire), leaving the rest to the new Vichy collaboration government established on July 10, 1940 under Henri Philippe Pétain. Its senior leaders acquiesced in the plunder of French resources, as well as the sending of French forced labor to Nazi Germany; in doing so, they claimed they hoped to preserve at least some small amount of French sovereignty. After an initial period of double-dealing and passive collaboration with the Nazis, the Vichy regime passed to active participation (largely the work of prime minister Pierre Laval). The Nazi German occupation proved costly; Nazi Germany appropriated a full one-half of France's public sector revenue. From 1942 to 1944 many French citizens were deported to death camps and Nazi concentration camps in Germany and Poland.

On the other hand, those who refused defeat and collaboration with Nazi Germany, led by Charles de Gaulle, organized the Free French Forces in the UK. They coordinated resistance movements in occupied and Vichy France. By August 1944, 260,000 French regulars and 300,000 FFI were fighting in France.

In June 1944 Allied forces invaded and forced the Germans to retreat. France was liberated and the Petain regime ended. Paris was liberated on August 25. On September 10, de Gaulle installed his provisional government in Paris. France could now again participate as a partner in the war. In 1945, the French army numbered 1,300,000 men, 412,000 of whom were fighting in Germany and 40,000 in Italy.

== Post-war (1945–Present) ==
=== 1945–1999 ===
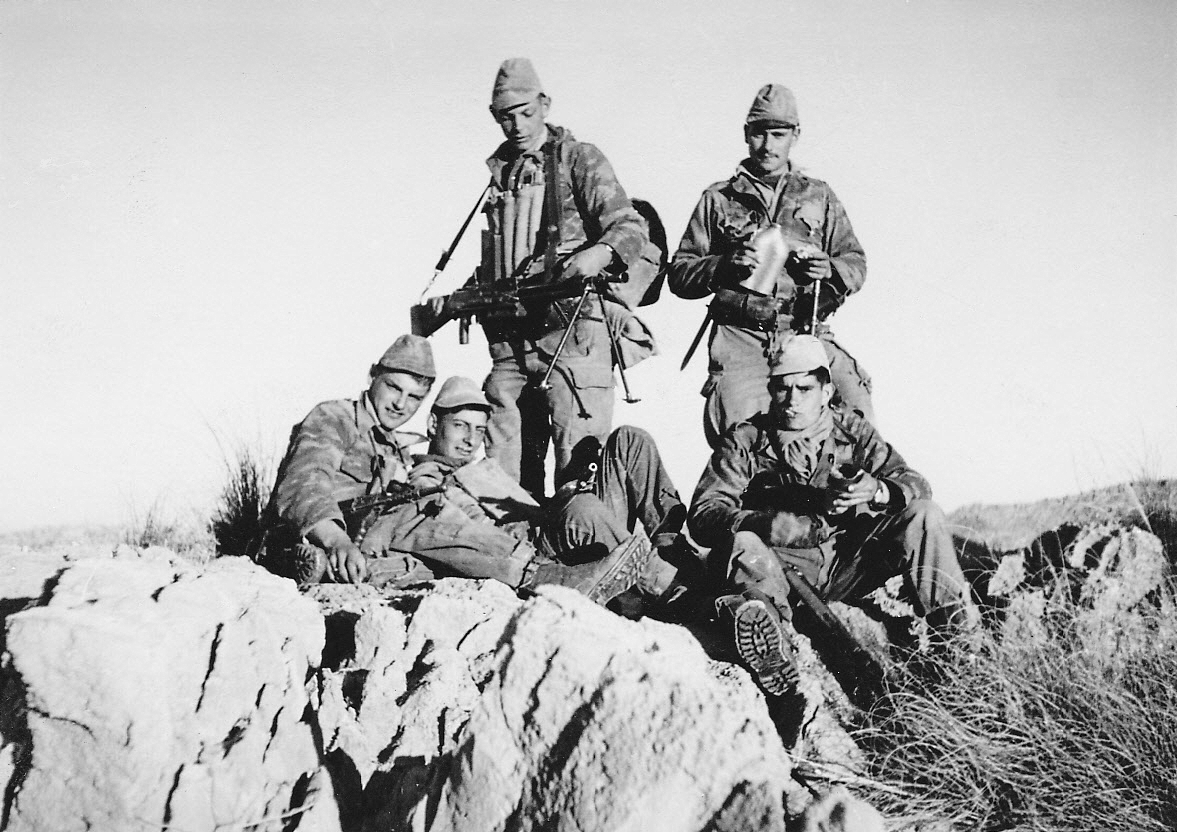
Members of the Commandos de Chasse, a French counterinsurgency commando in Algeria

France emerged from World War II to face a series of new problems. After a short period of provisional government initially led by General Charles de Gaulle, a new constitution (October 13, 1946) established the Fourth Republic under a parliamentary form of government, controlled by a series of coalitions. The mixed nature of the coalitions and a consequent lack of agreement on measures for dealing with colonial wars in Indochina and Algeria caused successive cabinet crises and changes of government. The war in Indochina ended with French defeat and withdrawal in 1954. Algeria was host to a community of a million European residents, known as the pieds-noir, contributing to France's refusal to grant it independence, until a large-scale war of independence beginning in November 1954 triggered a large-scale domestic political and civil crisis; Algeria was given its independence in 1962, unleashing a massive wave of immigration from the former colony back to France.

The threat of a coup d'état in May 1958 by French army units and French settlers opposed to concessions in the face of Arab nationalist insurrection led to the fall of the French government and a presidential invitation to de Gaulle to form an emergency government to forestall the threat of civil war. Swiftly replacing the existing constitution with one strengthening the powers of the presidency, he became the elected president in December of that year, inaugurating France's Fifth Republic.

In July 1961 when Tunisia imposed a blockade on the French naval base at Bizerte, hoping to force its evacuation the crisis culminated in a three-day battle between French and Tunisian forces that left some 630 Tunisians and 24 French dead, and eventually led to France ceding the city and naval base to Tunisia in 1963.

In 1965, in an occasion marking the first time in the 20th century that the people of France went to the polls to elect a president by direct ballot, de Gaulle won re-election with a 55% share of the vote, defeating François Mitterrand. Meanwhile, the Algerian War went on raging, with de Gaulle progressively adopting a stance favouring Algeria's independence. This was interpreted by his supporters in 1958 as a form of treason, and part of them, who organized themselves in the OAS terrorist group, rebelled against him during the Algiers putsch of 1961. But De Gaulle managed to put an end to the war by negotiating the Evian Agreements of March 1962 with the FLN.

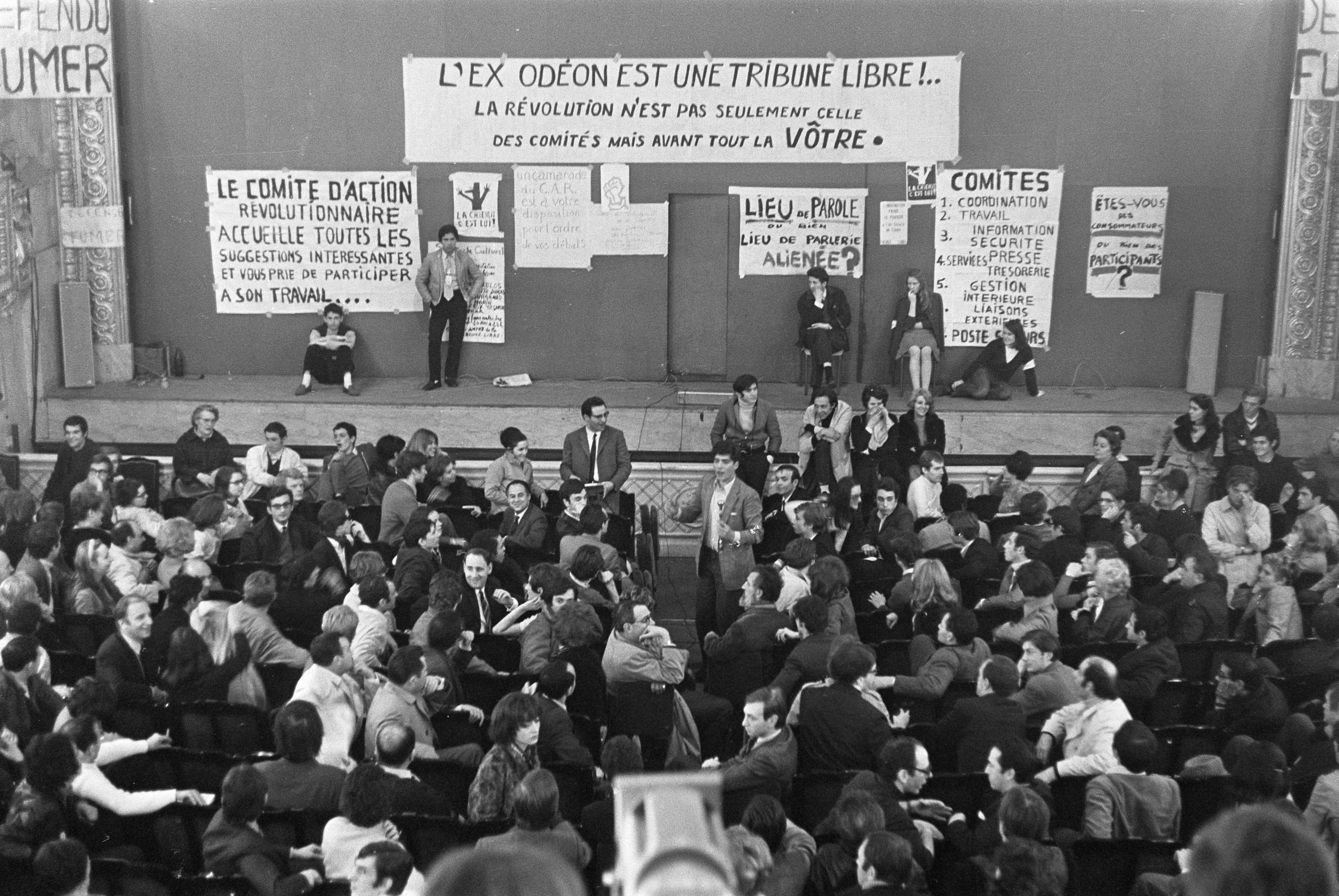
Students occupy the Théâtre de l'Odéon, 28 May 1968

By the end of the 1960s, however, French society grew tired of the heavy-handed, patriarchal Gaullist approach, and of the incompatibilities between modern life and old traditions and institutions. This led to a students' and worker revolt in May 1968, with a variety of demands including educational, labor and governmental reforms, sexual and artistic freedom, and the end of the Vietnam War. The movement saw occupations of public spaces, strikes and demonstrations. At one point, de Gaulle went to see troops in Baden-Baden, possibly to secure the help of the army in case it were needed to maintain public order. However, snap legislative elections subsequently held in late June returned a Gaullist majority in parliament. Still, May 1968 was a turning point in French social relations, with the Grenelle Agreements, in the direction of more personal freedoms and less social control, be it in work relations, education or in private life. In April 1969, de Gaulle resigned following his defeat in a national referendum on government proposals for decentralization, through the creation of 21 regions with limited political powers. He was succeeded by the Gaullist Georges Pompidou (1969–74), who died during his term. Pompidou's succession pitted the Gaullists against the more classical conservatives who eventually won, headed by the Independent Republican Valéry Giscard d'Estaing (1974–81).

Social movements continued after May 1968. These included the occupation of the Lip factory in 1973, which led to an experience in workers' self-management, supported by the CFDT, the Unified Socialist Party (PSU) and all of the far-left movements. LIP workers participated in the Larzac demonstrations against the extension of a military camp (in which José Bové was present). Maoism and autonomism became quite popular in far-left movements, opposing both the Socialist Party and the Communist Party.

While France continues to revere its rich history and independence, French leaders increasingly tie the future of France to the continued development of the European Union (EU).

The 1972 Common Program between the Socialist Party (PS), the Communist Party (PCF) and the Left Radical Party (PRG) prepared the victory of the Left at the 1981 presidential election, during which for the first time in the Fifth Republic a left-wing candidate won. François Mitterrand, re-elected in 1988, followed a left-wing inspired social and economic program, formulated in the 110 Propositions for France electoral program. However, reforms came to a stop in 1983. Mitterrand's two terms were marked by two cohabitations, the first one in 1986–88 with Jacques Chirac as Prime minister.

Mitterrand stressed the importance of European integration and advocated the ratification of the Maastricht Treaty on European economic and political union, which France's electorate narrowly approved in September 1992.

The conservative President Jacques Chirac assumed office May 17, 1995, after a campaign focused on the need to combat France's persistently high unemployment rate. The center of domestic attention soon shifted, however, to the economic reform and belt-tightening measures required for France to meet the criteria for Economic and Monetary Union (EMU) laid out by the Maastricht Treaty. In late 1995, France experienced its greatest labor unrest in at least a decade, as employees protested government cutbacks.

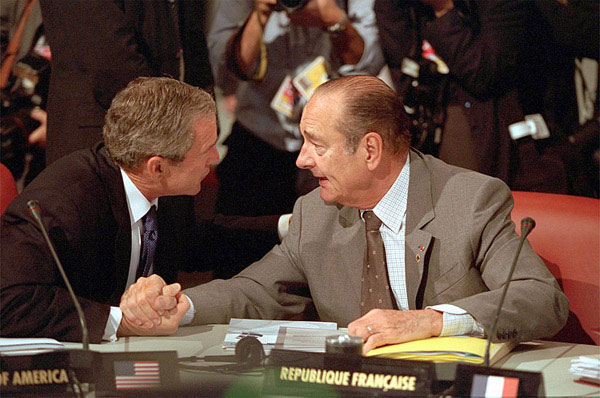
President Chirac and United States President George W. Bush talk over issues during the 27th G8 summit, July 21, 2001.

In evaluating Chirac's presidency in 2015, the British magazine The Economist stated:

In his term, unemployment averaged 10 percent, debt mounted, the French said no to Europe, and the suburban banlieues rioted....It was on his watch that France's competitive position sharply declined. His popularity sank to 16 percent....[But today] Jacques Chirac has emerged as an improbable icon of retro taste and a figure of public affection.

=== 2000 to present ===
==== Macron presidency ====
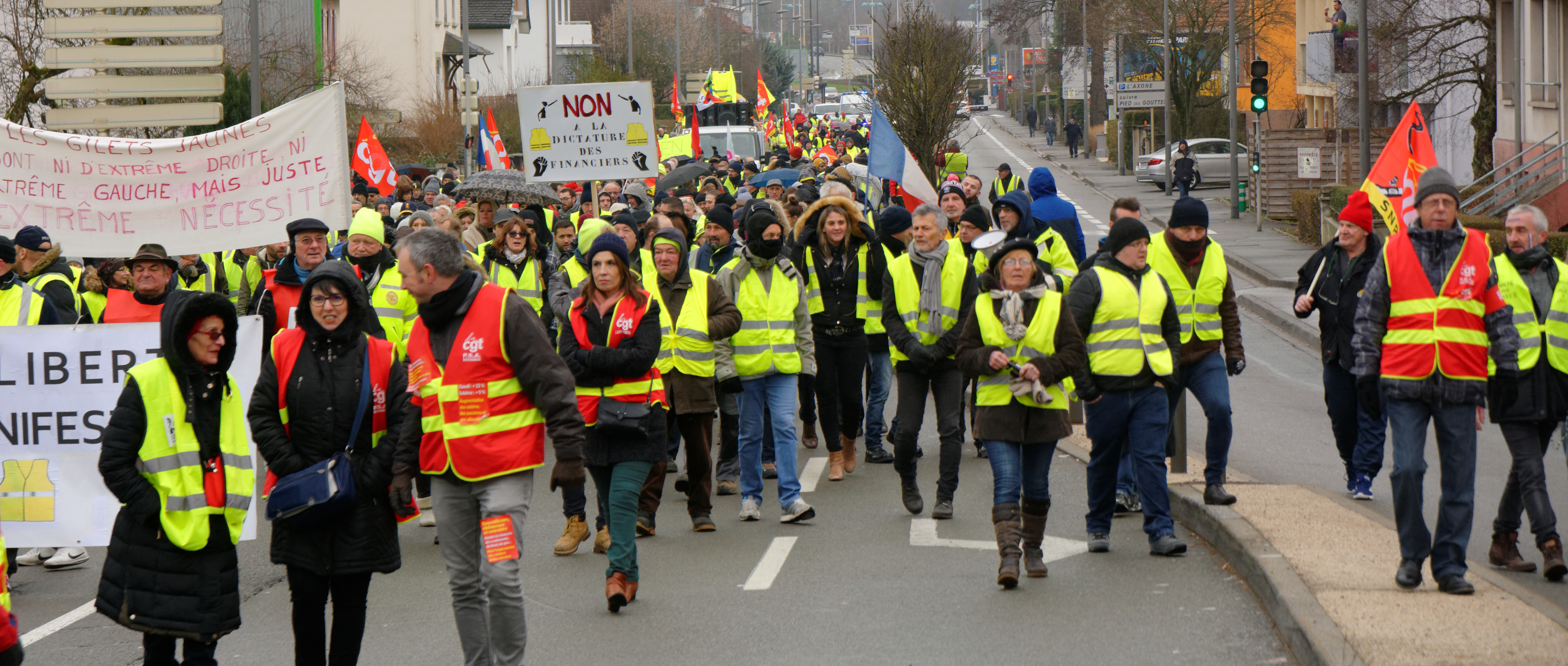
Demonstrations by members of the yellow vests movement in Montbéliard on 12 January 2019

Macron formally became president on 14 May 2017. In the 2017 legislative election, Macron's party La République en marche and its Democratic Movement allies secured a comfortable majority, winning 350 seats out of 577. After The Republicans emerged as the winners of the Senate elections, government spokesman Christophe Castaner stated the elections were a "failure" for his party.

In his first few months as president, Macron pressed for enactment of package of reforms on public ethics, labor laws, taxes, and law enforcement agency powers.

===== Corruption =====
In response to Penelopegate, the National Assembly passed a part of Macron's proposed law to stop mass corruption in French politics by July 2017, banning elected representatives from hiring family members. Meanwhile, the second part of the law scrapping a constituency fund was scheduled for voting after Senate objections.

Macron's plan to give his wife an official role within government came under fire with criticisms ranging from it being undemocratic to what critics perceive as a contradiction to his fight against nepotism. Following an online petition of nearly 290,000 signatures on change.org Macron abandoned the plan. On 9 August, the National Assembly adopted the bill on public ethics, a key theme of Macron's campaign, after debates on the scrapping the constituency funds.

===== Labour policy and unions =====
Macron aims to shift union–management relations away from the adversarial lines of the current French system and toward a more flexible, consensus-driven system modelled after Germany and Scandinavia. He has also pledged to act against companies employing cheaper labour from eastern Europe and in return affecting jobs of French workers, what he has termed as "social dumping". Under the EU rules, eastern European workers can be employed for a limited time at the salary level in eastern European countries which has led to dispute between the EU states.

The French government announced the proposed changes to France's labour rules ("Code du Travail"), being among the first steps taken by Macron and his government to galvanise the French economy. Macron's reform efforts have encountered resistance from some French trade unions. The largest trade union, the CFDT, has taken a conciliatory approach to Macron's push and has engaged in negotiations with the president, while the more militant CGT is more hostile to reforms. Macron's labour minister, Muriel Pénicaud, is overseeing the effort.

The National Assembly including the Senate approved the proposal, allowing the government to loosen the labour laws after negotiations with unions and employers' groups. The reforms, which were discussed with unions, limit payouts for dismissals deemed unfair and give companies greater freedom to hire and fire employees as well as to define acceptable working conditions. The president signed five decrees reforming the labour rules on 22 September. Government figures released in October 2017 revealed that during the legislative push to reform the labour code, the unemployment rate had dropped 1.8%, the biggest since 2001.

===== Macron´s second term 2022- =====
In the 2022 presidential election president Macron was re-elected after beating his far-right rival, Marine Le Pen, in the runoff. He was the first re-elected incumbent French president since 2002.

== Colonies ==
- Decolonization
  - First Indochina War
  - Algerian War of Independence
- French Algeria
  - Nationalism and resistance in Algeria
- French Indochina
- French Equatorial Africa
- French West Africa
- French Union
- French Community

== Population trends ==
The population held steady from 40.7 million in 1911, to 41.5 million in 1936. The sense that the population was too small, especially in regard to the rapid growth of more powerful Germany, was a common theme in the early twentieth century. Natalist policies were proposed in the 1930s, and implemented in the 1940s.

France experienced a baby boom after 1945; it reversed a long-term record of low birth rates. In addition, there was a steady immigration, especially from former French colonies in North Africa. The population grew from 41 million in 1946, to 50 million in 1966, and 60 million by 1990. The farm population declined sharply, from 35% of the workforce in 1945 to under 5% by 2000. By 2004, France had the second highest birthrate in Europe, behind only Ireland.

== Economy ==
Economic growth rates in France, 1900-1999
Decade	average annual growth rate
1900s	2.27%
1910s	1.89%
1920s	4.43%
1930s	0.63%
1945-49	2.16%
1950s	3.85%
1960s	4.98%
1970s	3.10%
1980s	2.02%
1990s	1.30%
Source: Jean-Pierre Dormois, The French Economy in the Twentieth Century (2004) p 31

The overall growth rate of the French economy shows a very strong performance in the 1920s and again in the 1960s, with poor performances in the 1910s, 1930s, and 1990s. By the end of the 19th century, France had joined the industrial era. But it had joined late, and comparatively it had lost in the competition with its war-footing neighbor Germany, and with its trade-based chief rival across the Channel, Great Britain. France had great industry and infrastructure and factories, by 1900; but compared to Germany and Britain was "behind", so that people spoke of and French politicians complained of "the French backwardness (le retard français)".

In 1870 the first signs of French industrial and general economic decline started to appear, compared to their new neighbor in Bismarck's newly united Germany, appeared during the Franco-Prussian War. The total defeat of France was less a demonstration of French weakness than it was of German militarism and industrial strength; this was in contrast to France's occupation of Germany during the Napoleonic wars. A huge sum had to be paid to Germany to end the war which provided the latter with even more capital.

By 1914, however, German armament and general industrialization had out-distanced not only France but all of its neighbors. Just before 1914, France was producing about one-sixth as much Coal as Germany, made less than a third as much Pig iron and a quarter as much Steel. In a scenario recounted best in Barbara Tuchman's book The Guns of August, France together with Germany's other competitors had entered a "war-footing" rearmament race which, once again, temporarily stimulated spending while reducing saving and investment.

The First World War—the "Great War"—however produced an economic outcome disastrous for all parties, not just for the German losers. As predicted by Keynes in his bitter post-Versailles Conference book, The Economic Consequences of the Peace, the heavy war reparations imposed upon Germany not only were insufficient to fuel French economic recovery, they greatly damaged a Germany which might have become France's leading trade and industrial development partner, thereby seriously damaging France as well.

And their very heavy loss of life, in the "Great War", robbed France of a generation of its youth, and of some of the youthful imagination necessary for facing Germany again, only 25 years later, in the Second World War, when a by-then aged French general staff was ill-prepared and entirely-defensive up against an even more militant German economy and army. Damaged by the Great Depression, the older leaders left in France were reluctant to assume a "war-footing" economy yet again, and France was overrun and occupied by Nazi Germany, and its wartime economy turned entirely to supporting Germany and the German war effort.

The great hardships of wartime, and of the immediate post-war period, were succeeded by a period of steady economic development, in France, now often fondly recalled there as The Thirty Glorious Years (Les Trente Glorieuses). Alternating policies of "interventionist" and "free market" ideas enabled the French to build a society in which both industrial and technological advances could be made but also worker security and privileges established and protected. By the end of the 20th century, France once again was among the leading economic powers of the world, although by the year 2000 there already was some fraying around the edges: people in France and elsewhere were asking whether France alone, without becoming even more an integral part of a pan-European economy, would have sufficient market presence to maintain its position, and that worker security and those privileges, in an increasingly "Globalized" and "transnational" economic world.

== Literature ==
Twentieth century French literature was profoundly shaped by the historical events of the century and was also shaped by—and a contributor to—the century's political, philosophical, moral, and artistic crises.

Inspired by the theatrical experiments in the early half of the century and by the horrors of the war, the so-called avant-garde Parisian theater, "New Theater" or "Theatre of the Absurd" around the writers Eugène Ionesco, Samuel Beckett, Jean Genet, Arthur Adamov, Fernando Arrabal refused simple explanations and abandoned traditional characters, plots and staging. Other experiments in theatre involved decentralisation, regional theater, "popular theater" (designed to bring working classes to the theater), and theater heavily influenced by Bertolt Brecht (largely unknown in France before 1954), and the productions of Arthur Adamov and Roger Planchon. The Avignon festival was started in 1947 by Jean Vilar who was also important in the creation of the T.N.P. or "Théâtre National Populaire."

The French novel from the 1950s on went through a similar experimentation in the group of writers published by "Les Éditions de Minuit", a French publisher; this "Nouveau roman" ("new novel"), associated with Alain Robbe-Grillet, Marguerite Duras, Robert Pinget, Michel Butor, Samuel Beckett, Nathalie Sarraute, Claude Simon, also abandoned traditional plot, voice, characters and psychology. To a certain degree, these developments closely paralleled changes in cinema in the same period (the Nouvelle Vague).

Among the leading women writers were Colette, Simone de Beauvoir, Hélène Cixous, Marguerite Duras and Monique Wittig.

Twentieth century French literature did not undergo an isolated development and reveals the influence of writers and genres from around the world. In turn, French literature has also had a radical impact on world literature. Because of the creative spirit of the French literary and artistic movements at the beginning of the century, France gained the reputation as being the necessary destination for writers and artists. Important foreign writers who have lived and worked in France (especially Paris) in the twentieth century include: Oscar Wilde, Gertrude Stein, Ernest Hemingway, William S. Burroughs, Henry Miller, Anaïs Nin, James Joyce, Samuel Beckett, Julio Cortázar, Vladimir Nabokov, Eugène Ionesco. Some of the most important works of the century were written by foreign authors in French (Eugène Ionesco, Samuel Beckett).

France has been more permissive in terms of censorship, and many important foreign language novels were originally published in France while being banned in America: Joyce's Ulysses (published by Sylvia Beach in Paris, 1922), Vladimir Nabokov's Lolita and William S. Burroughs's Naked Lunch (both published by Olympia Press), and Henry Miller's Tropic of Cancer (published by Obelisk Press).

== Art ==
Following on the radical developments of Impressionism and Post-Impressionism at the end of the nineteenth century, the first half of the twentieth century in France saw the even more revolutionary experiments of cubism, dada and surrealism, artistic movements that would have a major impact on Western, and eventually world, art. After World War II, while French artists explored such tendencies as tachism, fluxus and new realism, France's preeminence in the visual arts was eclipsed by developments elsewhere (the United States in particular).

== See also ==
- 2005 civil unrest in France
- French law on secularity and conspicuous religious symbols in schools
- Liberalism and radicalism in France
- Non-conformists of the 1930s
