= Gustave Mentré =

French air force general

Gustave Mentré was a French Air Force general. A participant in the Algiers putsch of 1961, he was sentenced to five year's imprisonment, suspended. At his trial, where he was defended by René Floriot, he denied that he had supported the coup.

He was restored to his rank in 1982. However, other sources report him as having died in 1975.
