= Michel Gouraud =

Marie-Michel Gouraud (10 June 1905 – 20 March 1991) was a French Army general. In 1961, he took part in the Algiers putsch, for which he was sentenced to seven years' imprisonment and dismissed from the Army. Released by Charles de Gaulle in 1965, he was amnestied in 1968 and restored to his military rank in 1982.
