= Commandos de Chasse =

French military units during the Algerian War

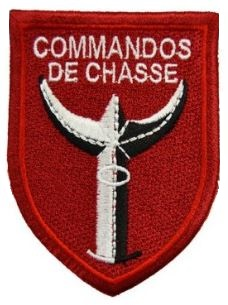
- Commandos de Chasse shoulder patch
- Active: 1959-1962
- Country: France
- Branch: French army
- Type: Commando
- Role: Air assault Artillery observer Bomb disposal Clandestine operation Close-quarters battle Counterinsurgency; Desert warfare Direct action Forward air control HUMINT; Irregular warfare Long-range penetration Manhunt; Mountain warfare Raiding; Reconnaissance; Special operations Special reconnaissance Tracking; Urban warfare
- Size: Company
- Engagements: Algerian war

Commanders
- Notable commanders: General Challe

The Commandos de Chasse (English:Hunting Commandos) were a French Army Commandos (special operations capable) unit that specialized in clandestine operation, commando style raids, counterinsurgency, irregular warfare, long-range penetration, special operations, special reconnaissance, and targets tracking. This unit raised for the Algerian war.

French Air Force General Maurice Challe ordered the forming of Commandos de Chasse (Hunting Commandos) in December 1958 and by 1959 there were around 25 commando units in each Army Corps area in Algeria. Around 150 would be eventually formed with most containing around 140 men but with some commando legers (light commandos) having only 70 men. Enlisted membership consisted of 30 to 60 percent Moslem volunteers, mostly harkis, "turned" ALN fighters, and veterans of regular French army units. The commandos contained a higher proportion of French personnel than other French colonial units.

The Commandos' task was to track and follow ALN units until they were engaged by French army intervention units.Many times their mission involved long-range penetration for a quick raiding to destroy enemy hideouts, special operations behind enemy lines to capture or kill high-value targets (most were killed more than captured), and special reconnaissance to intelligence gathering on enemy movements.

The Commandos were designated by either a K (for Kimono) or P (for Partisan) prefix followed by a number.

Commandos wore the standard French Army green or camouflaged uniforms, often mixed, with Bigeard caps or camouflaged berets. They did not wear bush hats or helmets. They often disguised themselves in partial or full native clothing.

They were equipped with standard French army small arms and light machine guns, mainly of 9mm MAT 49 submachine guns, 7.5mm MAS 36 bolt-action rifles, MAS 49 semi-automatic rifles and MAS 49/56 grenade launcher rifles, some AA52 light machine guns, which supplanted and then replaced the FM 24-29 light machine guns, as well as offensive and defensive hand grenades.

== See also ==
- Counterinsurgency
- Commandos (Portugal)
