= Maurice Challe =

French general

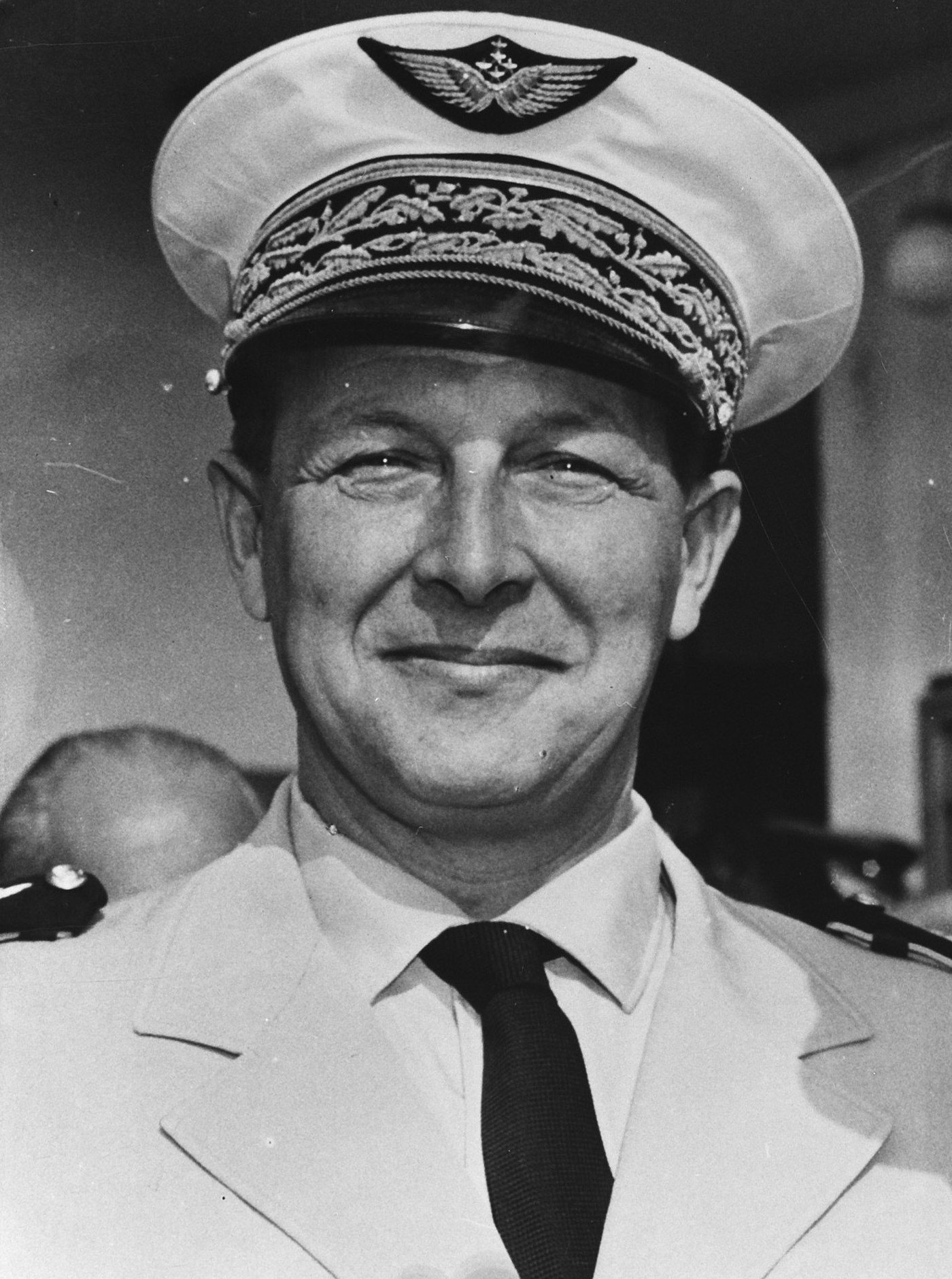
- Maurice Challe in 1961
- Born: 5 September 1905; Le Pontet, France
- Died: 18 January 1979 (aged 73); Paris, France
- Military career
- Allegiance: France
- Branch: French Army (1925–1928); French Air Force (1928–1961)
- Service years: 1925–1961
- Rank: Général d’Armée
- Conflicts: World War II; Algerian War; Challe Plan; Suez Crisis

Maurice Challe (5 September 1905 – 18 January 1979) was a French general during the Algerian War, one of four generals who took part in the Algiers putsch.

A native of Le Pontet, Vaucluse, Challe served in the Second World War. After the armistice of 22 June 1940, he sided with the Vichy government and took command of a reconnaissance group in Avignon. After the occupation of Southern France in November 1942 and the dissolution of the Armistice Army, Challe joined the Organisation de résistance de l'armée and later transmitted the Luftwaffe order of battle to the British prior to D-Day.

In 1958, Challe backed Charles de Gaulle's return to power. He'd initially served his conscription service in the infantry and was later appointed a pilot officer in military aviation, going on to become commander of the French Air Force in Algeria between 1955 and 1960.

In July 1956, Egyptian leader Gamal Abdel Nasser took control of the Suez Canal, in violation of agreements he had signed with the British and French governments. On 14 October 1956, Challe visited British Prime Minister Anthony Eden at Chequers, accompanied by French Minister of Labor Albert Gazier. The two Frenchmen told Eden of the secret negotiations between Israel and France regarding a proposed Israeli attack on Egypt followed with military occupation by European powers, to control the Suez Canal. Eden backed the plan with UK resources including military forces, directly leading to the Suez Crisis.

Challe was a French Air Force general whose greatest military success was in the realm of counter-insurgency operations during the Algerian War. His offensive, begun in March 1959, succeeded in substantially weakening the ALN. Through the use of speed and concentration of force, Challe kept the ALN insurgents in constant retreat and disorder. His innovative tactics would be studied and emulated by others - notably Syrian government forces in the Syrian Civil War seeking to keep insurgency at bay and off balance. The Challe Plan was only partially completed before he was reassigned to France in April 1960.

A line of electrified wire, minefields and other military barriers, the Challe Line, was named after him. It doubled another defence work, the Morice Line, which fortified the border and separated Algeria from Morocco and Tunisia.

In March 1960 he was named as Commander-in-Chief of NATO Forces in Central Europe.

Challe was one of the heads of the Algiers putsch of 1961, along with Raoul Salan, Edmond Jouhaud, and André Zeller. A prime reason for Challe's involvement was his concern that the Muslim harkis who had served with the French Army against the FLN would be subject to reprisals in the event of Algerian independence. In the event, large numbers of these loyalists were massacred in 1962. On 22 April Challe made a radio broadcast where he appealed to the Army to stop taking orders from the government, he declared that "I am in Algeria to honor our pledge to keep Algeria", adding that he "reserved the right of extending the action to metropolitan France to reestablish a constitutional and republican order". After the failure of the putsch, he and Zeller surrendered to the French Army (while Salan and Jouhaud created the OAS). Challe was sentenced to 15 years imprisonment. He was freed in December 1966 and received amnesty from President de Gaulle in 1968.

Challe died of cancer aged 73 on 18 January 1979.
