= Edmond Jouhaud =

French Air Force general (1905-1995)

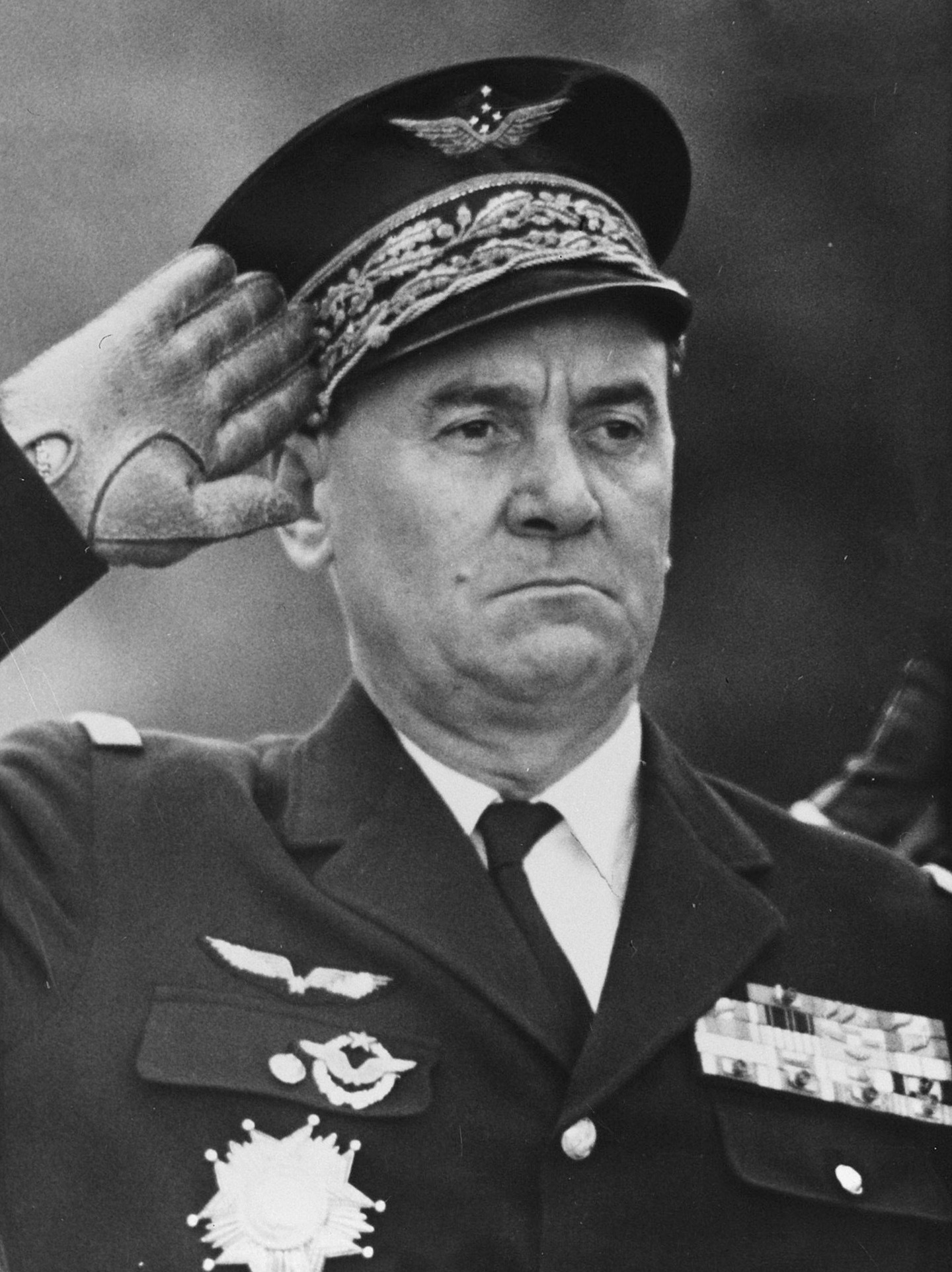
- Edmond Jouhaud in 1961
- Born: 2 April 1905; Aïn Boucefar, French Algeria
- Died: 4 September 1995 (aged 90); Royan, France
- Military career
- Allegiance: France
- Branch: French Air Force
- Service years: 1926–1961
- Rank: Général d'armée aérienne
- Conflicts: World War II; First Indochina War; Algerian War; Algiers putsch of 1961

Edmond Jules René Jouhaud (French pronunciation: [ɛdmɔ̃ ʒuo]; 2 April 1905 – 4 September 1995) was one of four French generals who briefly staged a putsch in Algeria in April 1961.

== Early life ==
Edmond Jouhaud was born on 2 April 1905 in French Algeria. He was a descendant of early Algerian pioneers from Limoges, in France.

== Military career ==
Edmond Jouhaud entered the École spéciale militaire de Saint-Cyr in 1924. With the rank of commanding officer, Jouhaud led the resistance against German occupation in the region of Bordeaux since 1943. He fled to Britain in March 1944 to join the Free French Forces. As army general he had been the inspector general of the Air Force in French North Africa. After the failure of the putsch, he became the deputy of Raoul Salan in the Organisation armée secrète. While Salan fled to Spain, Jouhaud remained out of loyalty to his birthplace.

He had served as air force commander during France's war in Indochina and air force chief of staff in Algeria. He left the air force in 1960 and allied himself with French Army Gen. Raoul Salan, who shared his hatred for de Gaulle. Generals Maurice Challe and Andre Zeller joined them in a group that seized power in Algiers April 21, 1961, after de Gaulle agreed to negotiate on Algerian independence with National Liberation Front guerrillas. In Paris, the government handed out weapons in the streets and told citizens to be ready for an invasion of rebel troops from North Africa. But the coup fizzled in five days. Gen. Jouhaud went underground in the OAS—Organization Armee Secrete—which waged a campaign of killings and bombings in Algeria and mainland France, including several plots to kill de Gaulle.

Jouhaud was captured in March 1962 and sentenced to death by a military court. However, after his OAS superior, Salan, only received a life sentence, opinion turned against executing him. He called for the remaining activists of OAS to end their terrorist campaign, and, after a harrowing five-month period of uncertainty, his sentence was commuted by Charles de Gaulle. Salan was released from prison in December 1967, and pardoned in 1968. He was rehabilitated by a law passed in 1982 under the presidency of François Mitterrand.

Jouhaud was one of the most decorated officers in the French military prior to participating in the putsch.

== Death ==
Jouhaud died on 4 September 1995.

Military offices
Preceded by Max Gelée	Chief of Staff of the French Air Force; 1 October 1958 – 14 March 1960	Succeeded by Paul Stehlin
