= Battle of Djebel Bouk'hil (1961) =

- Part of Algerian War
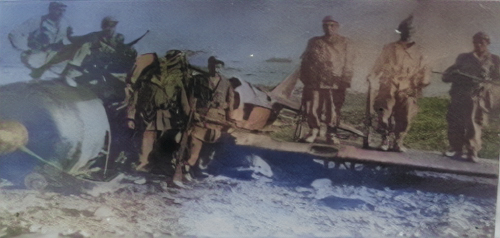
- A French aircraft destroyed during the battle of Djebel Bouk'hil
Date	17 – 18 September 1961
Location	Djebel Bouk'hil, Djelfa, Algeria
Result	FLN victory

Belligerents
(Algeria) FLN	France

Commanders and leaders
(Algeria) Mohamed Chabani	Unknown

Strength
Algerian claims: 370 - 400	Algerian claims: 12,000 (17 September); 14,000 (18 September)

Casualties and losses
Algerian claims: 2 (17 September); 7 (18 September)	Algerian claims: 400 men, 3 Aircraft (17 September); 300 men (18 September)

The Battle of Djebel Bouk'hil was a major fight in the Algerian War in 1961 when the French intercepted a meeting between FLN commanders, then Besieging the Mountain.

== Background ==
On 16 September 1961, the French learned about a meeting of FLN commanders, including Mohammed Chabani, hiding with around 370 mujahideen fighters in Djebel Bouk'hil. The next day, 17 September the area was completely surrounded, and the battle began.

== Battle ==
=== 17 September 1961 ===
French aircraft conducted bombing runs over the area, with squadrons of 9 to 12 planes each causing chaos among the FLN fighters. Meanwhile, helicopters were en route from Bousaada, and artillery and tanks joined the fray. The FLN fighters bided their time, waiting for the dust to settle and the French to let their guard down. When the opportunity arose, they opened fire on the French forces, but the French leaders refrained from retreat, and forced their men to fight back, with the FLN economising on ammo only shooting when they needed to, by 9PM both sides had retreated. the French lost about 400 men with 3 Aircraft, and the FLN lost 2 Martyrs.

=== 18 September 1961 ===
The following day, the French got reinforcements of 2,000 men, making a force of up to 14,000 soldiers, aiming to seal off all possible routes. However, the FLN had devised a clever strategy. They chose to traverse the northern passage known as Al-Dir, renowned for its formidable terrain. Since this route remained unblocked by the French, the FLN fighters successfully navigated through it without encountering any obstacles. Meanwhile, the French mistakenly believed that the Algerians were herding livestock through a ravine. It was only later that they realized the FLN forces had eluded them. In the aftermath of this disastrous battle, the French established a sizable garrison on Djebel Bouk'hil, maintaining a presence there for months. During this period, they perpetrated numerous war crimes against innocent villagers and civilians residing in the area. The FLN lost 7 men and the French lost 300 men.
