= Morice Line =

Defensive line in the Algerian War

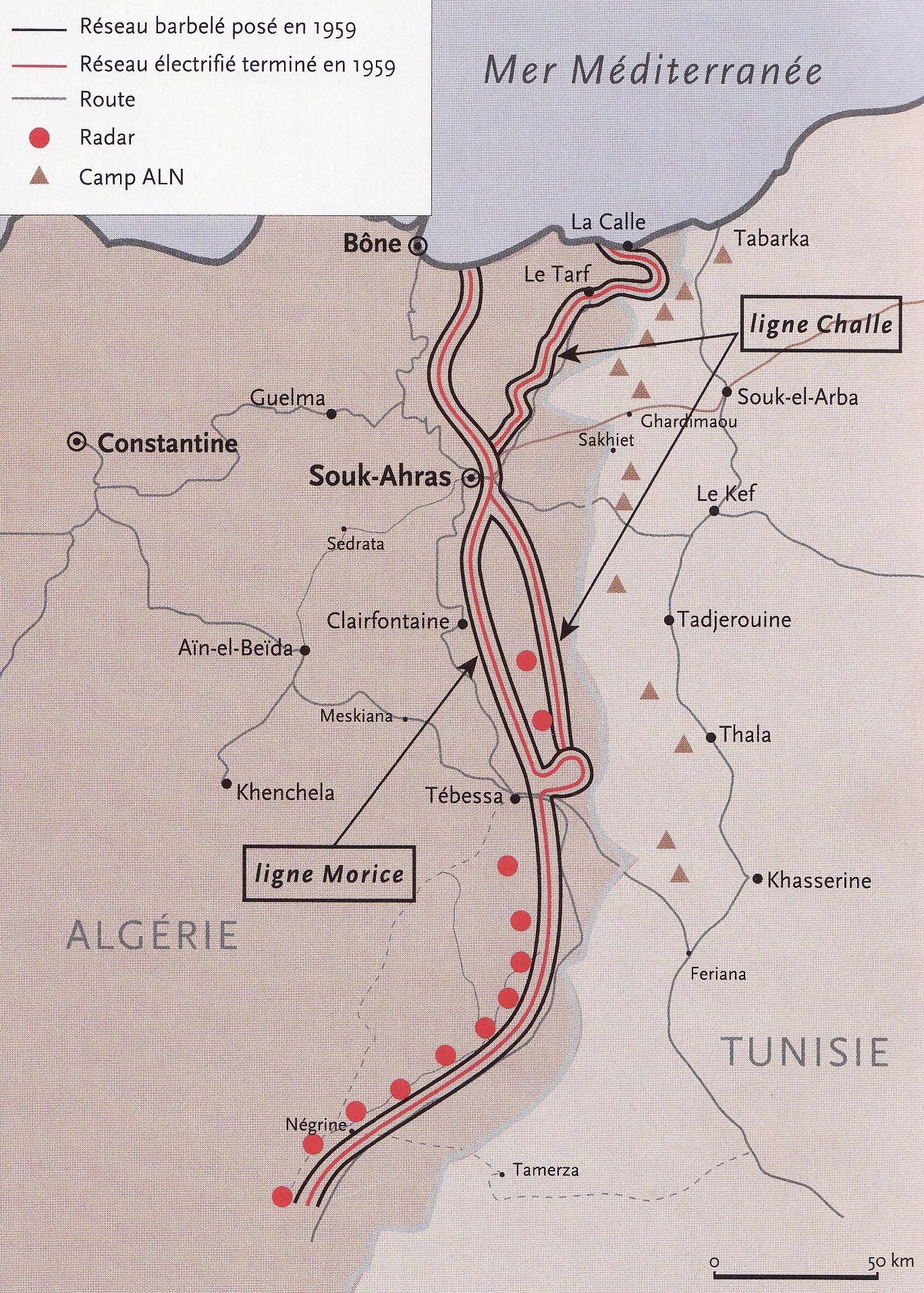
Map of Morice Line.

The Morice Line was a defensive line which went into effect in September 1957 during the Algerian War. It was constructed under French authority to prevent supplies reaching the rebel guerrillas of the Algerian National Liberation Front in the then French-controlled Algeria, from the neighbouring country of Tunisia. It was named after then French Minister of Defence André Morice.

== Design ==
The center of the Morice Line was a 2.5 m high electric fence that ran its entire length. This electric fence carried 5,000 volts and also had barbed wire entanglement on one side. On each side of the fence was a minefield that extended 45 meters to each side. On the Algerian side there was also a patrolled track.

The Morice Line was 460 km long along the border with Tunisia and 700 km long along the border with Morocco, and was built with then state-of-the-art electronic systems and a mined barrage. These alarms, radars and searchlights, and the use of anti-personnel landmines helped to coordinate a response from the forces assigned to the line. These forces combined with the previous electronic systems made the line almost impenetrable.

== Importance of the Line ==
The Morice Line had a significant impact of the reduction of guerrillas activities by forces that originated from Tunisia. Though the Morice Line was not a "fortification" in the traditional sense of the word, it was nonetheless effective in reducing FLN activity during the Algerian War.

== Anti-personnel landmines ==
Following the end of the war in 1962, extensive efforts were made by the new Algerian authorities to clear and dismantle the Morice Line. They included the forced employment of captured harkis and other Muslim loyalists who had served with the French Army, many of whom were killed by landmines. Decades after the confrontation came to an end, the Morice Line, which had been heavily mined by the French, continued to cause casualties among local Algerian populations. Algeria eventually joined the Ottawa Treaty, which bans the use of landmines, and in 2017, Algeria announced that after decades of work, it had fulfilled its mine clearance obligation under the treaty. It announced the clearing of the last 93 mined or suspected mined areas, including 78 former mine barrages in the Morice Line.
