= Algiers putsch of 1961 =

Attempted coup in French Algeria during the Algerian War

Algiers Putsch
- Part of the Algerian War
- From left to right: French Generals André Zeller, Edmond Jouhaud, Raoul Salan and Maurice Challe during the coup (Gouvernement General building, Algiers, 23 April 1961)
Date	21–26 April 1961
Location	French Algeria
Result	Coup failed: Civil war averted

Belligerents
French Government	Units of the French Army

Commanders and leaders
Charles de Gaulle; Michel Debré	Maurice Challe; Edmond Jouhaud; André Zeller; Raoul Salan; Hélie de Saint Marc

Casualties and losses
1 soldier killed	

The Algiers putsch (Arabic: انقلاب 1961 في الجزائر; French: Putsch d'Alger or Coup d'État d'Alger), also known as the putsch of the generals (Putsch des généraux), was a failed coup d'état intended to force French President Charles de Gaulle not to abandon French Algeria, the resident European community and pro-French Algerians. Organised in French Algeria by retired French Army generals Maurice Challe (former commander-in-chief in French Algeria), Edmond Jouhaud (former Inspector General of the French Air Force), André Zeller (former Chief of Staff of the French Army) and Raoul Salan (former commander-in-chief in French Algeria), it took place from the afternoon of 21 to 26 April 1961 in the midst of the Algerian War (1954–1962) and brought the nation to the brink of a civil war.

The organisers of the putsch were opposed to the secret negotiations that French Prime Minister Michel Debré's government had started with the anti-colonialist National Liberation Front (FLN). General Salan stated that he joined the coup without concerning himself with its technical planning; however, it has always been considered a four-man coup d'état, or as De Gaulle put it, "un quarteron de généraux en retraite" ("a quartet of generals in retirement").

The coup was to come in two phases: an assertion of control in French Algeria's major cities Algiers, Oran and Constantine. The metropolitan operation would be led by Colonel Antoine Argoud, with French paratroopers descending on strategic airfields. The commanders in Oran and Constantine, however, refused to follow Challe's demand that they join the coup. At the same time information about the metropolitan phase came to Prime Minister Debré's attention through the intelligence service.

On 22 April all flights and landings were forbidden in Parisian airfields; an order was given to the Army to resist the coup "by all means". The following day, President De Gaulle made a famous speech on television, dressed in his World War II uniform (he was 70 years old and long since a civilian head of state) ordering the French people and military to help him.

== Context ==
75% of the French people had voted in favor of Algerian self-determination during the disputed referendum of 8 January 1961 organised in metropolitan France. The wording of the referendum was, "Do you approve the Bill submitted to the French people by the President of the Republic concerning the self-determination of the Algerian population and the organisation of the public power in Algeria prior to self-determination?".

French citizens living abroad or serving abroad in the military were allowed to vote, as were all adult Algerians, regardless of ancestry, in a single electoral college. Speaking for the Provisional Government of the Algerian Republic (GPRA, the political arm of the FLN), Ferhat Abbas called for a boycott of the referendum, as did 16 retired French generals and factions among the pied noir (French settler) community opposed to independence. Self-determination was approved by 75% of voters overall and 69.5% in Algeria. The government reported voter turnout of 92.2%. Other sources claim that four out of ten people entitled to vote in France and Algeria abstained.

Following the outcome of the referendum, Michel Debré's government started secret negotiations with the GPRA. On 25 January 1961 Col. Antoine Argoud visited with Premier Debré and threatened him with a coup directed by a "colonels' junta"; the French Army was in no way disposed to let the French Algerian départements created in 1848 after the 1830 conquest become independent.

== Chronology ==
On 22 April 1961, the retired generals Maurice Challe, André Zeller and Raoul Salan, helped by colonels Antoine Argoud, Jean Gardes and civilians Joseph Ortiz and Jean-Jacques Susini (who would later form the pro-colonialist OAS terrorist group), took control of the territory's capital, Algiers. General Challe criticised what he saw as the government's treason and lies toward French Algerian colonists and loyalist Algerians who trusted it, and stated that

the command reserves its right to extend its actions to Metropolitan France and to reconstitute a constitutional and republican order seriously compromised by a government whose illegality is blatant in the eyes of the nation.

During the night the 1st Foreign Parachute Regiment (1e REP), composed of 1,000 men and headed by Hélie de Saint Marc, took control of all of Algiers' strategic points in three hours. The units directly involved in the putsch were the 1st and 2nd REP, the 1er REC and the 14th and 18th Regiments of Chasseurs Parachutistes. Together they comprised the elite units of the airborne divisions of the French Army. Initially, there were pledges of support from other regiments (the 27th Dragoons, the 94th Infantry, the 7th Algerian Tirailleurs and several Marine infantry units), but these seem to have reflected the views of their senior officers only and there was no active participation.

The head of the Parisian police, Maurice Papon, and the director of the Sûreté nationale, formed a crisis cell in a room of the Comédie-Française, where Charles de Gaulle was attending a presentation of Racine's Britannicus. During the entracte the president was informed of the coup by Jacques Foccart, his general secretary of African and Malagasy Affairs and closest collaborator, in charge of covert operations.

Algiers' population was awakened on 22 April at 7:00 am to a message read on the radio: "The army has seized control of Algeria and of the Sahara". The three rebel generals—Challe, Jouhaud, and Zeller—had the government's general delegate, Jean Morin, arrested as well as the National Minister of Public Transport, Robert Buron, who was visiting, and several civil and military authorities. Several regiments put themselves under the command of the insurrectionary generals.

Gen. Jacques Faure, six other officers and several civilians were simultaneously arrested in Paris. At 5:00 pm, during the ministers' council, Charles de Gaulle declared: "Gentlemen, what is serious about this affair is that it isn't serious". He then proclaimed a state of emergency in Algeria, while left-wing parties, the trade union CGT and the NGO Ligue des droits de l'homme (LDH, Human Rights League) called to demonstrate against the military's coup d'état.

The following day, on Sunday 23 April, Gen. Salan arrived in Algeria from Spain and refused to arm civilian activists. At 8:00 pm President de Gaulle appeared in his 1940s vintage military uniform on television, calling on French military personnel and civilians, in metropolitan France or in Algeria, to oppose the putsch:

An insurrectionary power has established itself in Algeria by a military pronunciamento... This power has an appearance: a quartet of retired generals. It has a reality: a group of officers, partisan, ambitious and fanatical. This group and this quartet possess an expedient and limited knowledge of things. But they only see and understand the Nation and the world distorted by their delirium. Their enterprise leads directly towards a national disaster ... I forbid any Frenchman, and first of all any soldier, to execute a single one of their orders ... In the face of the misfortune which hangs over the country and the threat to the Republic, having taken advice from the Constitutional Council, the Prime Minister, the president of the Senate, the president of the National Assembly, I have decided to invoke article 16 of the Constitution [on the state of emergency and full special powers given to the head of state in case of a crisis]. Starting from this day, I will take, directly if the need arises, the measures which seem to me demanded by circumstances ... Frenchwomen, Frenchmen! Help me!

Due to the popularity of a recent invention, transistor radio, de Gaulle's call was heard by the conscript soldiers, who refused en masse to follow the professional soldiers' call for insurgency and in some cases jailed their insurrectionist officers. The putsch met with widespread opposition, largely in the form of civil resistance, including a one-hour general strike called by the trade unions the day after de Gaulle's broadcast. Within the army itself much depended on the position taken by individual senior officers. The 13th Light Division of Infantry, responsible for the strategic Zone Sud Oranais (south Oran zone) and including Foreign Legion units, followed the lead of its commander, Gen. Philippe Ginestet, in remaining loyal to the government in Paris. Ginestet was subsequently assassinated by the OAS in retaliation.

On Tuesday 25 April government authorities in Paris ordered the explosion of the atomic bomb Gerboise Verte (lit. "green jerboa") in the Sahara as part of a scheduled testing program. Gerboise Verte exploded at 6:05 am. While the test and test site were already prepped as part of the French national nuclear program, the test timeline appears to have been accelerated to ensure that the security of the device was not compromised.

The few military units which had followed the mutinying generals progressively surrendered. Gen. Challe gave himself up to the authorities on 26 April, and was immediately transferred to metropolitan France. The putsch had been successfully quashed, but Article 16 granting full and extraordinary powers to de Gaulle was maintained for five months. "The Battle of the Transistors"—as it was called by the press—was quickly and definitively won by de Gaulle.

== Casualties ==
The only known fatality was French Army Sergeant Pierre Brillant, who was killed by the parachutists while defending the radio transmitter at Ouled Fayet, Algiers. Brillant was aiming at 1st REP 3rd Company Capt. Estoup when he was shot by a legionnaire.

== Trials and amnesty ==
The Haut Tribunal militaire sentenced Challe and André Zeller to 15 years in prison. However, they were granted an amnesty and had their military positions restored five years later. Raoul Salan and Jouhaud escaped. Salan was condemned in absentia to death (later commuted to life sentence), as was Jouhaud. Salan and others later founded the OAS, a terrorist paramilitary organization that attempted to stop the ongoing process of the April 1962 Independence Evian Agreements for the Algerian territories of France.

A July 1968 act granted amnesty; the 24 November 1982, law reintegrated the surviving generals into the army. Salan, Jouhaud and six other generals (Pierre Bigot, Jacques Faure, Marie-Michel Gouraud, Gustave Mentré, Jean-Louis Nicot and André Petit) benefitted from this law.

== Claims of CIA and BND involvement ==
Suggestions began to appear in French media that the perpetrators might have the backing of reactionary elements in U.S. President John F. Kennedy's administration, particularly the Central Intelligence Agency (CIA). A day after the rebelling generals completed the takeover of Algeria, Italian newspaper Il Paese first editorialized that "It's not by chance that some people in Paris are accusing the American secret service headed by Allen Dulles of having participated in the plot of the four ‘ultra’ generals.” The next day in the Soviet Union Pravda stated that the mutiny was encouraged by NATO, the Pentagon and the CIA. Reports appeared claiming that the claim was partly spread by or at the encouragement of minor officials in the Élysée Palace. French officials seemed to want to put out the story that "the generals plot was backed by strongly anti-communist elements in the United States Government and military services." Within days Le Monde ran a front-page editorial that the CIA involvement was rogue and not politically approved: “It now seems established that some American agents more or less encouraged [Maurice] Challe.... President Kennedy, of course knew nothing of all this". Subsequently President Kennedy, through his White House Press Secretary Pierre Salinger's meeting with French Foreign Minister Maurice Couve de Murville, reassured de Gaulle that this plot was not backed by the CIA or any other U.S. government entity. The next day M. de Murville appeared before the Foreign Affairs Committee of the Chamber of Deputies to testify that there was no evidence of U.S. complicity. U.S. President John F. Kennedy himself contacted de Gaulle to pledge his support, including military assistance, if needed. President de Gaulle declined Kennedy's offer, fearing any controversy if American troops shot any French counterparts.

On March 18, 2025, the U.S. National Archives released a June 30, 1961 memo for President Kennedy, a critique of the CIA written by Kennedy aide Arthur Schlesinger, Jr. titled "CIA Reorganization." Schlesinger referenced the "Generals' revolt":

In the Paris Embassy today, there are 123 CIA people. CIA in Paris has long since begun to move into areas of political reporting normally occupied by State. The CIA men doing overt internal political reporting outnumber those in the Embassy's political section by 10-2. CIA has even sought to monopolize contact with certain French political personalities, among them the President of the National Assembly. CIA occupies the top floor of the Paris Embassy, a fact well known locally; and on the night of the Generals' revolt in Algeria, passers-by noted with amusement that the top floor was ablaze with lights. (I am informed that Ambassador Gavin was able to secure entrance that night to the CIA offices only with difficulty.)

Paese Sera was financed directly by the Italian Communist Party, who had unofficial editorial control. Its editor, Mario Malloni, was a member of the Soviet-backed World Peace Council. IPS, it has been said, "consistently released and reported anti-American and pro-Soviet bloc stories which are either distorted or entirely false." During a June 1961 hearing before a subcommittee of the Committee on the Judiciary in the United States Senate, Richard Helms testified that the article published by il Paese was likely part of a Soviet propaganda campaign designed to divide the U.S. and French governments.

There were other claims of foreign support: French journalist Patrick Pesnot contended that the French generals also had the support of the Bundesnachrichtendienst (West German Federal Intelligence Service) leader and Dulles protégé Reinhard Gehlen. However, General Challe himself always contended that he had never been in contact with any foreign countries [sic] in this affair.

== See also ==
- Foreign Airborne Battalions and Regiments of France
- Coup d'état
- May 1958 crisis

== Bibliography ==
- Abramovici, Pierre (2011). Le putsch des généraux: de Gaulle contre l'armée, 1958-1961. Paris: Fayard. ISBN 978-2-213-63627-6.
- Fauvet, Jacques; Planchais, Jean (1961). La Fronde des Généraux. Paris: Aarthaud.
- Porch, Douglas (1992). The French Foreign Legion: a complete history of the legendary fighting force (1st ed.). New York: Harper Perennial. ISBN 978-0-06-092308-2.
- Roberts, Adam (March 1975). "Civil Resistance to Military Coups". Journal of Peace Research. 12 (1): 19–36. doi:10.1177/002234337501200102. ISSN 0022-3433.
- Roberts, Adam (June 1976). "La défaite du putsch de 1961: un exemple de résistance civile". Espoir. No. 15. Institut Charles de Gaulle. pp. 47–54.
- Blum, William (May 2003). "1960-1966, Algeria: The Generals' Plot Against de Gaulle" (PDF). Press for Conversion!. No. 51. pp. 22–23.
