= French destroyer Surcouf =

Destroyer of the French Navy

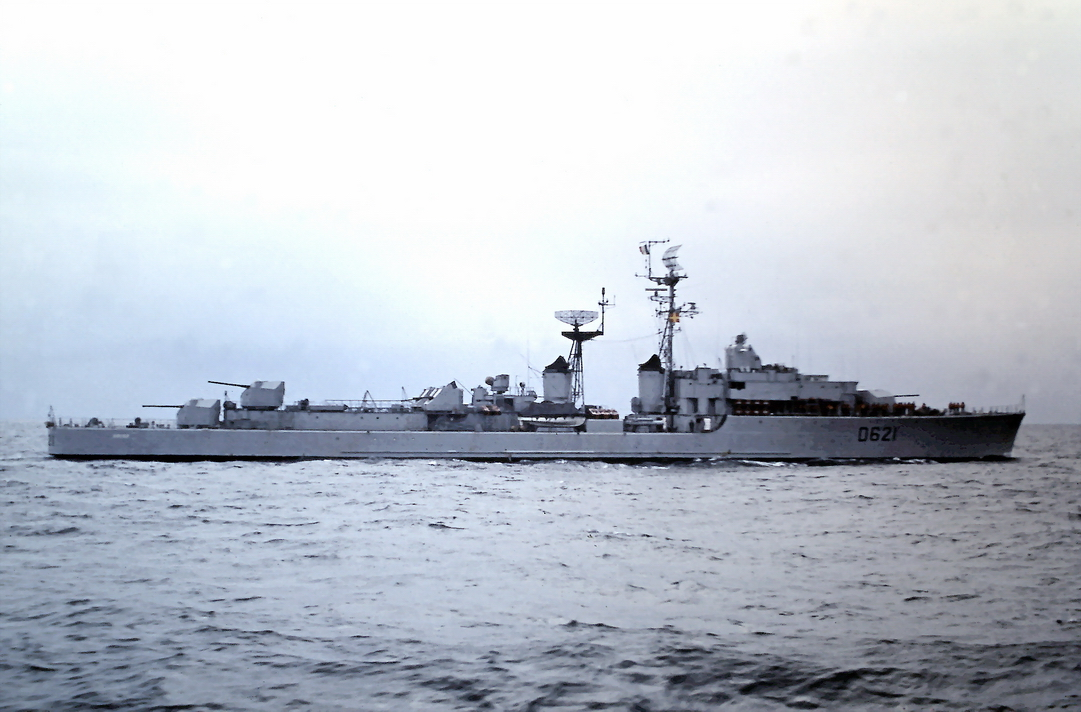
- Surcouf in 1970, a few months before her accident. The forward 57 mm turret and the aft torpedo launchers had made way for an enlarged bridge and staff housing quarters when she was transformed into a flotilla leader ship.

History

France
- Name: Surcouf
- Namesake: Robert Surcouf
- Laid down: February 1951
- Launched: 3 October 1953
- Commissioned: 1955
- Decommissioned: 5 May 1972
- Home port: Brest and later Toulon
- Identification: D621
- Fate: Sunk as target

General characteristics
- Class & type: T 47-class destroyer
- Displacement: 2,750 tons standard; 3,740 tons full load
- Length: 128.62 m (422.0 ft)
- Beam: 12.7 m (42 ft)
- Draught: 5.4 m (18 ft)
- Installed power: 63,000 shp (47,000 kW)
- Propulsion: Parsons geared steam turbines; 2 shafts; 4 fuel boilers
- Speed: 34 kn (63 km/h)
- Range: 5,000 nmi (9,300 km) at 18 kn (33 km/h)
- Complement: 347
- Armament: 6 × 127 mm (5 in) guns (3 × 2); 6 × 57mm/60 modèle 1951 guns (3 twin turrets); 4 × 20 mm (0.79 in) guns (4 × 1); 6 × 550 mm (22 in) short-tubes for anti-submarine torpedo (2 × 3); 6 × 550 mm (22 in) long-tubes for dual purpose : anti-ship and anti-submarine torpedo (2 × 3)

Surcouf was a T 47-class destroyer of the French Navy. She was the fourth French ship named in honour of privateer and slave trader Robert Surcouf.

== Design and construction ==
Laid down in February 1951 at Lorient and launched in October 1953, Surcouf was commissioned into the French Navy in 1955. She was the first of twelve T 47-class destroyers. With a standard displacement of 2,750 tons and a length of 128.6 metres (421.9 ft), the ship had a beam of 12.7 metres (41.7 ft) and a draught of 5.4 metres (17.7 ft). Her armament consisted of six 127 mm (5 in) guns which were mounted in three twin turrets, six 57 mm (2.2 in) guns in twin mounts and four single-mounted 20 mm (0.79 in) guns. There were four banks of three 550 mm (22 in) torpedo tubes, capable of launching both anti-submarine homing and anti-ship torpedoes. Surcouf had two shafts, geared turbines, and four boilers, which were capable of producing 63,000 horsepower (47,000 kW) and a top speed of 34 knots (63 km/h; 39 mph) (71,725 shp (53,485 kW) and 38 knots (70 km/h; 44 mph) during trials). At 18 knots (33 km/h; 21 mph), Surcouf had a range of 5,000 nautical miles (9,300 km; 5,800 mi). The ship had a complement of 347 personnel.

=== Major modification ===
In the early 1960s, Surcouf was converted to a command ship to become a flotilla leader. In order to install an operations centre and housings for an admiral and his staff, the forward 57 mm mount was removed (extending forward the bridge) and the two aft torpedo platforms were removed so that housing quarters could be constructed. The overhaul was conducted at the arsenal of Brest between 11 June 1960 (commencement of work) and 4 October 1961 (end of the tests).

== Operational service ==
Following her commissioning in November 1955, Surcouf's homeport was Toulon, being assigned to the First Destroyers Flotilla (1st FEE), at the head of the Fourth Destroyer Division (DEE4). In 1956 she alternated between naval exercises (including NATO's) and Algerian coastal surveillance. From October to December Surcouf took part in Operation Musketeer during the Suez Crisis.

On 10 April 1959 her assignment and homeport were changed. Surcouf was attached to the Tenth Destroyer Division (DEE10) of the Light Fleet (the Escadre légère) based at Brest. On 26 March 1960, Surcouf was involved in a collision with the cargo ship Léognan off Groix, suffering significant damage but no loss of life.

After her conversion into a flotilla leader (June 1960 – October 1961) Surcouf was assigned to the main fleet (the Escadre), based at Toulon, where she was the flagship of the admiral commanding the 1st FEE (ALFEE).

In March 1962, during the Battle of Bab El Oued, Surcouf was sent to shell the OAS-held Bab el-Oued quarter of Algiers along with her sister ship Maillé-Brézé. After suggestions from the naval command, the bombardment was called off as impractical. The destroyers kept their station close to the shore as a deterrent. Along with three other destroyers, both vessels ferried troops to Algiers on 2 March to counter the OAS rebellion.

=== Final fate ===
On 6 June 1971, before sunrise, in the Mediterranean Sea 60 nautical miles (110 km) southeast of Cartagena, Spain, as she sailed with the tactical group of the aircraft carrier Arromanches, Surcouf was again in a collision when she cut across the bow of the Soviet tanker General Bocharov (Генерал Бочаров). The tanker, six times heavier than the destroyer, could not avoid the collision and rammed Surcouf at 16 knots (30 km/h; 18 mph). Nine men from Surcouf were lost at sea and one was severely burned (he later died of his wounds). When the French destroyer Tartu (which belonged to the same tactical group) attempted to tow the badly damaged ship, Surcouf snapped in two, the bow sinking quickly. The aft part was taken in tow to Toulon via Cartagena. Surcouf was eventually sunk as a target by an Exocet anti-ship missile after being decommissioned on 5 May 1972.
