= Charles Ailleret =

French general (1907–1968)

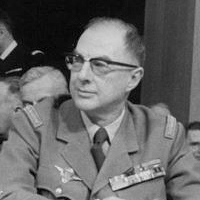
- Ailleret at the United Nations in 1966
- Born: 26 March 1907; Gassicourt, France
- Died: 9 March 1968 (aged 60); La Réunion
- Military career
- Allegiance: Free France; France
- Branch: French Army
- Service years: 1928–1968
- Rank: General of the Army (1962)

Charles Ailleret (26 March 1907 – 9 March 1968) was a general of the French Army and chief of staff of the French Armed Forces. He joined the French Army in 1928 and was mustered out in 1942 following the defeat of the Army in 1940. During the Second World War he was a resistance fighter and a deportee, returning to army service in 1945. Rising quickly through the upper ranks, he was a strong supporter of French president Charles de Gaulle, supporting de Gaulle during the Algerian War and opposing the rebellious OAS. He was Chief of Staff of the French Armed Forces from 1962 to 1968, during which time he oversaw the French withdrawal from the NATO integrated command structure, while negotiating military cooperation contingency agreements. Ailleret was instrumental in the development of the French nuclear weapons program, overseeing the first French nuclear test in 1960, and authoring many articles outlining a French nuclear national defense strategy. He was killed along with family members in an airplane crash at La Réunion during a tour of French territories and allies in 1968.

== Early life and World War II career ==
Charles Louis Marcel Ailleret was born 26 March 1907 in Gassicourt (Seine-et-Oise), now a district of Mantes-la-Jolie.

Ailleret entered the École Polytechnique in 1926 and graduated into the artillery in 1928, joining the 32nd Artillery Regiment as a second lieutenant. In 1930 he was promoted to lieutenant and assigned to the Artillery Staff at the École supérieure technique de l’artillerie. In 1934 he was assigned to the army's Powder Commission. Ailleret was promoted to captain in 1936 and assigned to the Inspector General of Artillery (IGA). In 1938 he joined the 2nd Mountain Artillery Regiment in Chambéry, but returned to the IGA in 1939. In 1940, Ailleret was serving in the remnant French army under the Vichy government on the staff of the inspector general. In this capacity, he was a member of the French delegation to the talian Armistice Commission. Returning to France he rejoined the IGA until he was reassigned to the staff of General Aimé Doumenc, who was Commissioner for National Reconstruction. In the next two years he was reassigned to the Technical Information Centre, then the Army general staff.

In 1942, Ailleret was demobilized from the army. He then joined the O.R.A. (Organisation de résistance de l'armée), becoming its commander for the Northern Zone. In June 1944, he was arrested by the Gestapo and deported on August 15, 1944, from Pantin train station to the Buchenwald concentration camp and then the Dora-Mittelbau, from which he returned in April 1945.

== Post-war career ==
Back in France, Ailleret resumed his role as a staff officer in the reconstituted French army. He was posted to Moscow as military attaché in September 1945, returning to France in March 1946, where he was reassigned to the office of the Army Chief of Staff.

In 1947 Ailleret was promoted to colonel and joined the 43rd Parachute Demi-Brigade as commander. He was certified as a parachutist, practicing delayed-opening techniques and earning an instructor's badge. In 1949 he joined the Army Technical Section.

Ailleret was a strong advocate for the acquisition of nuclear weapons by France. In January 1952 he was appointed head of a "Special Weapons Command," in charge of research into nuclear, biological and chemical warfare research. In 1953 Ailleret was appointed to coordinate military applications at the French Atomic Energy Commission (CEA). In this position he was part of the inner circle that conducted the research to develop a nuclear weapon. He was promoted to Brigadier General in 1956 and placed in command of "special weapons" (i.e., nuclear weapons). In 1958 he was the joint forces commander for special weapons and directed the operations leading to the explosion of the first French atomic bomb, Gerboise Bleue, on 13 February 1960, in Reggane, in the Sahara Desert. This posting earned him the appellation "The Atomic General." Ailleret was promoted to Major General in 1959.

Ailleret's activities with the Special Weapons Command included the study of chemical weapons for use in Algeria against insurgents in caves and cellars.

Ailleret argued for a French nuclear capability, positing that such weapons would remove the possibility of war with another nuclear power, and that the weapons would be relatively inexpensive. At the same time, he argued against limited wars conducted according to what Ailleret considered outdated codes of conduct, termed by Ailleret the "Agincourt syndrome." Ailleret considered nuclear disarmament efforts to be ineffectual, given the difficulty of verifying such disarmament.

== Algeria ==
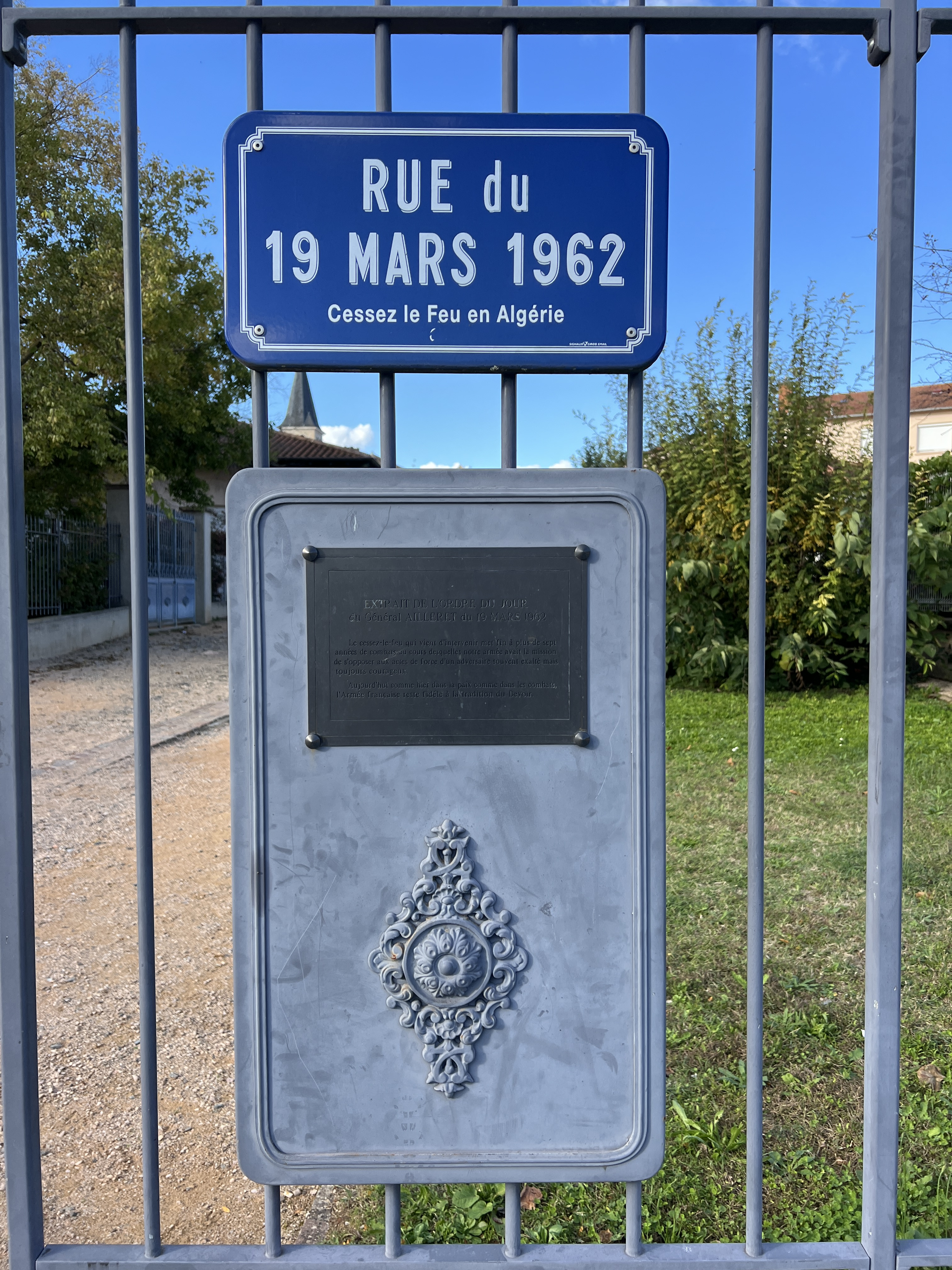
Plaque in Feillens commemorating Ailleret's general order of 19 March 1962

In 1960 Ailleret was assigned the command of the 2nd Infantry Division and the Northeast Constantine Zone in Algeria. In April 1961 he assumed command of the Constantine Army Corps along the Morice Line facing Tunisia, taking the command the day after the Algiers putsch of 1961, which he opposed. In June 1961, as a result of his loyalty during the Algerian crisis to French President Charles de Gaulle, he assumed the duties of supreme commander of the joint forces in Algeria.

In 1962, Ailleret was promoted to General of the Army. He issued Order of the Day No. 11 of March 19, 1962, announcing the ceasefire in Algeria. He opposed the rebel Organisation armée secrète (OAS) army faction in March 1962. The Battle of Bab El Oued between French regular forces and the OAS occurred during Ailleret's command, as well as the 1962 Isly massacre, in which poorly trained Army conscripts fired on Pieds-noirs (Algerian-born Europeans). Alleret then participated, with Christian Fouchet, High Commissioner in Algeria, in the transitional authority at the time of independence.

His opposition to the OAS and the Algerian rebellion made Ailleret a focus of hatred in dissident army ranks. His Paris residence was bombed by the OAS on 23 September 1961. His wife Liliane was home at the western Paris apartment, but was uninjured despite significant damage to the building.

== Army command ==
Ailleret was appointed Chief of the Defence Staff on July 16, 1962 and returned to Paris. Ailleret was known as a decisive officer who could be harshly critical. His critics called him a "general from the ranks," a term that he adopted as a point of pride.

Ailleret was an outspoken advocate for the Gaullist strategy for an autonomous deterrence and command. He organized France's withdrawal from NATO's integrated command in 1966, devising and implementing a strategy of a French nuclear defense "in all directions (tous azimuths) ." However, Ailleret maintained close contact with American military leadership, resulting in the 1967 Ailleret-Lemnitzer agreements describing contingencies for military cooperation between French and NATO forces in the event of a Warsaw Pact invasion of Western Europe.

== Death ==
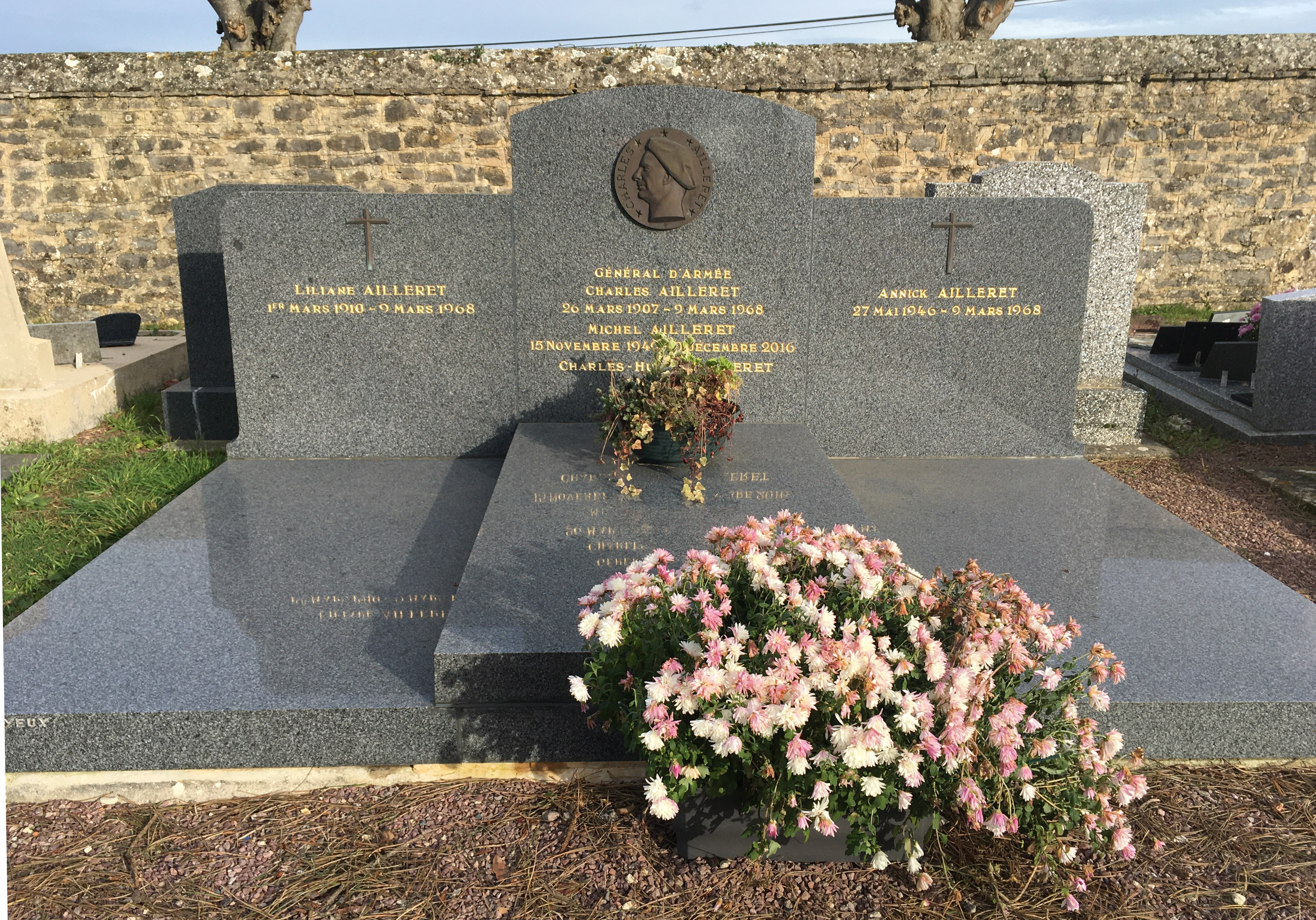
Ailleret's family tomb

On March 9, 1968, after an inspection tour in the Indian Ocean, Ailleret died, along with his wife and daughter and sixteen other people, in the Sainte-Marie Douglas DC-6 crash. In poor visibility, the DC-6 turned the wrong way shortly after takeoff from Saint-Denis de La Réunion and crashed into a hill. Ailleret was due for compulsory retirement, but was confirmed to continue in his post earlier in 1962.

Ailleret's funeral took place on March 15 at the Hôtel des Invalides, attended by de Gaulle, and was broadcast on television. Charles Ailleret and his family are buried in Ver-sur-Mer, Normandy.

== Family ==
He was the brother of Pierre Ailleret, who directed research that established the French civil nuclear power program. With his wife, Liliane Ribotton Ailleret, he had a son and a daughter.

== Decorations ==
Charles Ailleret was the recipient of multiple French and foreign decorations, including:

- Grand Cross of the Legion of Honour
- Croix de Guerre 1939–1945;
- Cross for Military Valour (three citations, including one at the army level, April 21, 1962);
- Resistance Medal Medal of the French Resistance with rosette (decree of November 29, 1946);
- Combatant's Cross;
- 1939–1945 Commemorative war medal (France)
- North Africa Security and Order Operations Commemorative Medal
- Médaille d’honneur de la Jeunesse et des Sports (1956-1969)
- Grand Cross of the Military Order of Aviz (Portugal, December 19, 1966)
- Legion of Merit (United States) 1964

== Publications ==
- Histoire de l'Armement, Presses Universitaires France (1948)
- L’art de la guerre et la technique, Lavauzelle (1950)
- L’aventure atomique française – Comment naquit la force de frappe, Grasset, Paris, 1968
- Général du contingent – En Algérie, 1960-1962, Grasset, Paris

Military offices
| Preceded by André Martin | Chief of the Joint Staff of the French Military; 1962-1968 | Succeeded by Michel Fourquet |
