= Exodus of the Pied-Noirs =

1962 migration of colonists from Algeria to France

The exodus of the Pied-Noirs, or Exodus of the French from Algeria, refers to the wave of migration experienced around 1962 by the Pied-Noir community from Algeria, primarily to France. The French settlements in Algeria were then the result of the French conquest of Algeria beginning in 1830.

In 1959, the Pied-Noir population numbered 1,025,000, representing 10.4% of the population living in Algeria. And a population of 200,000 Jews. The fear of reprisals by the Algerian Liberation Movement against their community was widespread. In the summer of 1962, almost 800,000 French settlers fled Algeria for exile in France. Including 100,000 Jews and 200,000 pro French Algerians.

In 2022 president Emmanuel Macron met with Algerian born French citizens that came to France, and stated that a 1962 shooting by French troops against them was “unforgivable for the republic”. It marked the beginning of the mass exodus. He also stated "On that day, French soldiers, poorly commanded and deployed against their will, fired on French people ... That day was a massacre," and acknowledged a second massacre in Oran in the same year.

== See also ==
- The suitcase or the coffin
- Pieds-noirs
- French Algeria
