= French destroyer Maillé-Brézé (D627) =

Destroyer of the French Navy

Coordinates: 47°12′24″N 1°34′18″W

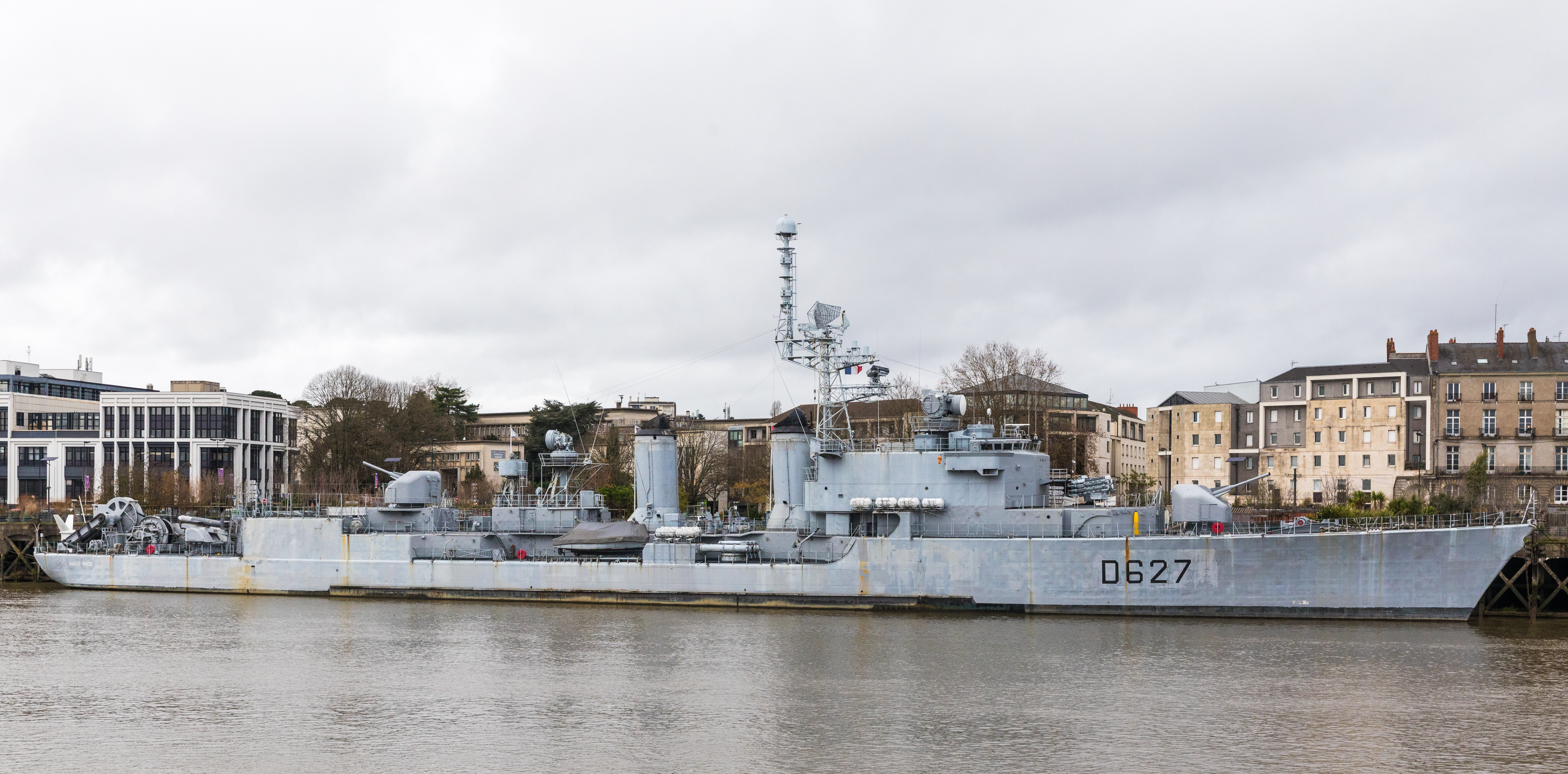
- Maillé-Brézé at Nantes in 2022

History

France
- Name: Maillé-Brézé
- Namesake: Jean Armand de Maillé-Brézé
- Laid down: February 1951
- Launched: October 1953
- Commissioned: 4 May 1957
- Decommissioned: 1988
- Identification: D627
- Fate: Museum ship

General characteristics
- Class & type: T 47-class destroyer
- Displacement: 2,750 tons standard; 3,740 tons full load
- Length: 128.6 m (422 ft)
- Beam: 12.7 m (42 ft)
- Draught: 5.4 m (18 ft)
- Installed power: 4 boilers; 63,000 shp (47,000 kW)
- Propulsion: 2 shafts; 2 geared steam turbines
- Speed: 34 knots (63 km/h; 39 mph)
- Range: 5,000 nmi (9,300 km; 5,800 mi) at 18 knots (33 km/h; 21 mph)
- Complement: 347
- Armament: 3 × twin 127 mm (5 in) guns; 3 × twin 57 mm (2.2 in) guns; 4 × single 20 mm (0.79 in) guns; 4 × triple 550 mm (22 in) torpedo tubes

Maillé-Brézé is a T 47-class destroyer (escorteur d'escadre) built for the French Navy during the 1950s. She is now a museum ship in Nantes.

== Design and description ==
The T 47-class ships were designed as enlarged and improved versions of the wartime Le Hardi class intended to serve as squadron escorts (Escorteur d'escadre). As built, the vessels had standard displacement of 2,750 long tons (2,794 t) and 3,740 long tons (3,800 t) at deep load. They measured 128.6 metres (421 ft 11 in) long overall with a beam 12.7 metres (41 ft 8 in) and a draught of 5.4 metres (17 ft 9 in). They were propelled by a pair of Rateau geared steam turbines, each driving one Propeller shaft using steam provided by four Indret boilers The turbines were rated at 63,000 metric horsepower (62,000 shp; 46,000 kW), enough to give the ships a maximum speed of 34 knots (63 km/h; 39 mph). They had enough fuel oil to give them a range of 5,000 nautical miles (9,300 km; 5,800 mi) at 18 knots (33 km/h; 21 mph).

The T 47s were designed for fleet anti-aircraft warfare (AA) with a main battery of French-designed Model 1948 127-millimetre (5 in) dual-purpose guns, which enabled them to use standard U.S. ammunition. The guns were mounted in three twin-gun turrets, one mount forward of the superstructure and a superfiring pair aft. The secondary armament consisted of 57 mm (2.2 in) AA guns in three twin turrets. One of these was positioned behind the forward 127 mm turret, firing over it; the other two turrets were located aft of the rear funnel, one on each side of the superstructure. In addition, the T 47s were equipped with four 20-millimetre (0.8 in) Oerlikon AA guns, one pair on the bridge wings and the others positioned between the rear funnel and the rear 57 mm turrets. The anti-submarine warfare (ASW) armament consisted of four triple banks of 550 mm (22 in) torpedo tubes, two on each broadside. These forward pair housed K2 unguided ASW torpedoes and each launcher was provided a set of reloads. The aft pair could fire either K2 torpedoes or M1923DT anti-ship torpedoes.

The ships were equipped with French sonars DUBV 1 and DUBA 1 mounted on the hull. They were fitted with twin tripods carrying a DRBV 11 combined surface and air-search radar and a DRBV 20A early-warning radar. They also carried a DRBC 11 surface gunnery radar and a DRBC 30 anti-aircraft radar. The main armament was guided by a single fire control director, with a second slotted aft for the 57 mm guns. The ships had a complement of 347.

== Construction and career ==
She was laid down by the Arsenal de Lorient on 9 October 1953, launched on 2 July 1955 and commissioned on 4 May 1957.

On 2 March 1962, Maillé-Brézé, along with another four destroyers, landed fresh troops at Algiers to fight the OAS uprising. Assisted by her sister ship Surcouf, she was about to shell the OAS-held quarter of Bab-el-Oued when a counter-order called the operation off. The destroyers instead took battle stations close to the shore as a deterrent.

In 1988, she was decommissioned and became a museum ship in Nantes. She has been listed as a monument historique by the French Ministry of Culture since October 1991.

On 21 February 2016, director Christopher Nolan announced plans to feature the ship in his then upcoming World War II film Dunkirk.

In 2025, the ship was chosen to host a pop-up event celebrating the 7th anniversary of the English/worldwide release of Azur Lane, a mobile game that features anthropomorphic "shipgirls" including Maillé-Brézé's previous Vauqelin-class incarnation.
