= 1968 Sainte-Marie Douglas DC-6 crash =

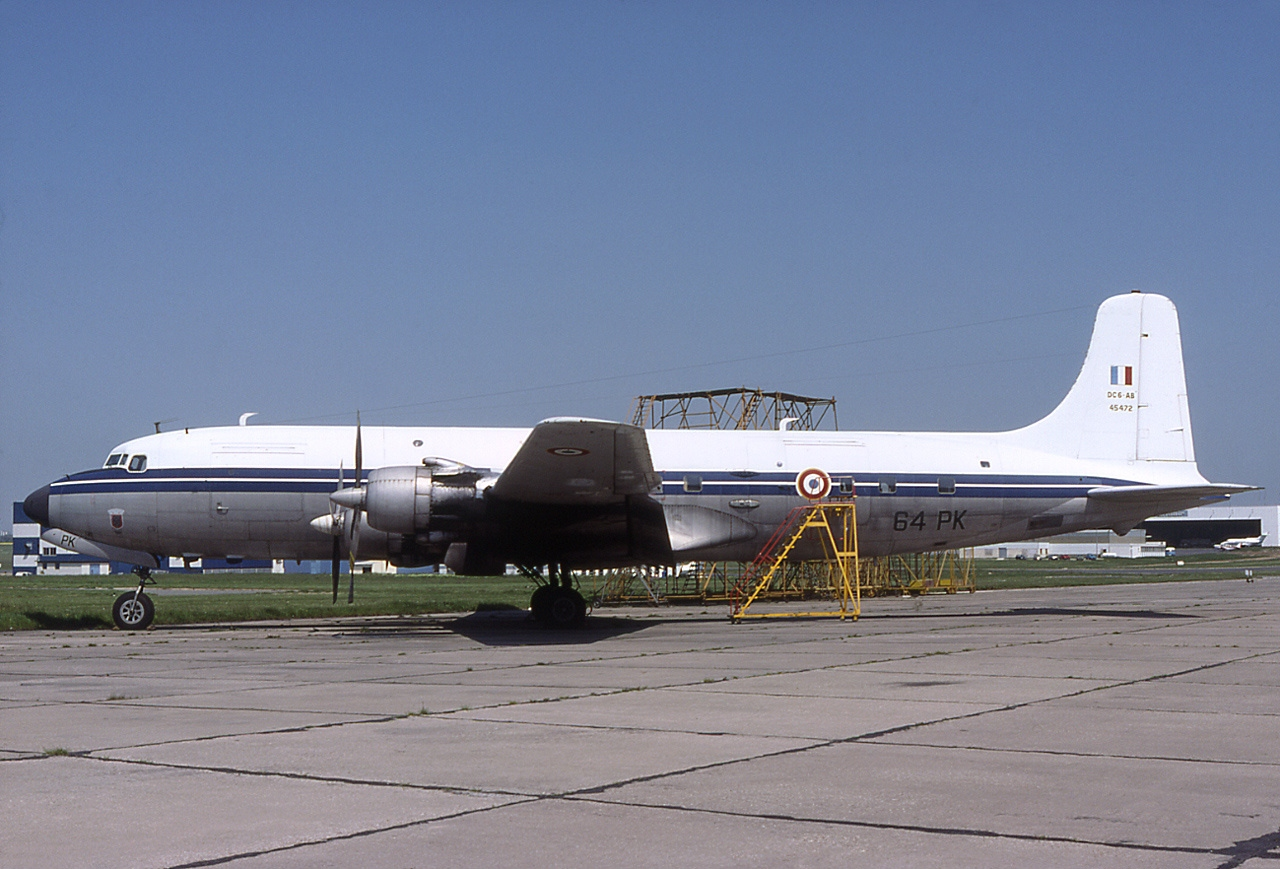
- A similar Douglas DC-6 of the French Air Force

Post-takeoff crash.
- Date: 9 March 1968
- Summary: Controlled Flight into Terrain
- Site: Sainte-Marie, Réunion, France

Aircraft
- Aircraft type: Douglas DC-6
- Operator: Groupe de Liaisons Aériennes Ministérielles
- IATA flight No.: F-RAFB/ 43748
- Flight origin: Gillot Airport
- Stopover: Djibouti Airport
- Destination: Paris
- Occupants: 20
- Passengers: 8
- Crew: 12
- Fatalities: 19
- Survivors: 1 (a Flight nurse)

The 1968 Sainte-Marie Douglas DC-6 crash was an aviation accident that occurred on the island of La Réunion, a French overseas department in the southwestern Indian Ocean, on the evening of 9 March 1968. A military Douglas DC-6 aircraft taking off from Gillot Airport at 23:15 crashed two minutes later in the commune of Sainte-Marie, Réunion, resulting in the deaths of nineteen people, including French General Charles Ailleret, Chief of Staff of the French Army. This aviation accident remains the deadliest in the history of La Réunion.

== Aircraft ==
The 1953 Douglas DC-6B, registered as F-RAFB/43748, was operated by the Groupe de Liaisons Aériennes Ministérielles (GLAM), responsible for the transportation of French government personnel.

== Disaster ==
The aircraft had arrived from Antananarivo in the early afternoon, and the flight back to Paris via Djibouti was scheduled for the following morning, but it was brought forward to that very evening. It departed from Gillot at 23:15 and the scheduled flight time to Djibouti was 11 hours and 40 minutes. However, in bad weather, the crew did not follow standard procedure when taking off from Gillot heading east and made an incorrect turn after takeoff, turning right toward the mountain instead of veering left out over the ocean. Shortly after takeoff, the plane crashed into a hill approximately 5km southeast of the runway and caught fire.

On board was the Chief of Staff of the French Army, General Charles Ailleret, along with his wife and daughter. The only survivor was General Ailleret's nurse, Michelle Renard.

The accident officially remains unsolved. However, as the departure had been brought forward, the crew had insufficient rest time and were believed to have been suffering from fatigue.

In 1998, Renard testified about the accident. A commemoration took place in March 2018.

== See also ==
- Sainte-Marie, Réunion
- Charles Ailleret
- List of aviation accidents and incidents with a sole survivor
