= Ailleret-Lemnitzer Agreement =

Secret defense agreement between France and NATO

The Ailleret-Lemnitzer agreement was a set of secret understandings between U.S. General Lyman Lemnitzer, the NATO Supreme Allied Commander, and French General Charles Ailleret, the French Army Chief of Staff, clarifying protocols for cooperation between France and NATO forces in the event of an invasion of Western Europe by the Warsaw Pact.

== Background ==
France had been a founding member of the North Atlantic Treaty Organization (NATO) in 1949. Following the alliance's establishment, NATO's headquarters was established at the Palais Dauphine just to the west of Paris. Alliance members established bases in France in the ensuing period. Most of these installations were American and Canadian air bases. Resentment against the United States and NATO increased through the 1950s and early 1960s following the Suez Crisis and France's involvement in the First Indochina War. France felt it was being cut out of NATO policy, particularly with respect to command leadership and nuclear weapons policy.

On 9 September 1965, French President Charles de Gaulle announced that France would withdraw from NATO's integrated command structure, though not from the alliance. Foreign forces stationed on French territory were to withdraw by 1 April 1967. The withdrawal involved the removal of American air bases from France and the relocation of NATO headquarters to Brussels.

== Negotiations ==
Despite the French withdrawal, both sides viewed French participation of European military operations as vital, with discussions between the American commanding general and Supreme Allied Commander Lyman Lemnitzer and French Chief of the Defence Staff General Charles Ailleret.

Ailleret and Lemnitzer ratified their discussions with an exchange of letters outlining their understandings.

The accords, dated 10 August 1967, defined a series of contingency instructions, comprising:

- In the event of a crisis, with prior and ongoing consultation and express consent of France, a military command structure that would French forces under NATO command within the defined theater of operations
- Agreement that French land forces would primarily be committed to central European operations, supported by French air defense forces
- Agreements for liaison in peacetime and wartime
- Joint exercises

The accords were primarily concerned with French forces that had been designated for deployment in Germany. Deployment of French land forces would be in accordance with established contingency plans, using French forces primarily as reserve forces for a counteroffensive. The land forces were defined as an army corps of two divisions, with logistical and combat support units. The French air defense forces were to operate in parallel with NATO systems unless and until they were placed under NATO command with French consent, at France's discretion. Exchange of information concerning the deployment of tactical nuclear weapons, intelligence, order of battle information, communication and operational procedures, logistics were agreed to continue under these protocols. A French liaison would be maintained at NATO headquarters for this purpose.
