= André Martin (soldier) =

Chairman of the Joint Chiefs of Staff of the French Armed Forces
- In office 12 April 1961 – 19 July 1962
- Preceded by: Army general Gaston Lavaud
- Succeeded by: Army general Charles Ailleret

Personal details
- Born: 27 February 1911 Saint-Cyr Paris, France
- Died: 11 March 2001 (aged 90) Saint-Julien-le-Châtel, France

Military service
- Allegiance: France
- Branch/service: French Air and Space Force
- Years of service: 1934–1967
- Rank: air general
- Unit: French Armed Forces
- Commands: Chief of the Joint Staff, Chief of Staff of the French Air Force, 33rd Reconnaissance Squadron, 5th Air Region Algiers

André Martin (1911–2001) was a French soldier who served as the Chief of the Joint Staff from 12 April 1961 until 19 July 1962.

== Military career ==
André Martin, a corp general of the air force, was the Chief of Staff of the French Air Force and the Commandant of the Air Forces, Fifth Region until his appointment as the Chief of Joint Staff. Born on 27 February 1911 in Saint-Cyr Paris, France, he enrolled in the Special Military School Saint-Cyr and went on to Military and Application School of the Air Force in 1938. He graduated as a pilot observer in 1934 and was moved to Dijon to serve in the North African troops during World War II. He became captain in 1940 in that period of which he was in-commands of Reconnaissance Group II of Oran, he was moved to School of EOA Rabat in 1943, and of that, he was in charge of Operations Reconnaissance Group III through which he partakes in the campaign of Italy and Corsica, France then Germany in 1944, he served in Center-Ecole de Versailles after he left the 32nd Air Squadron, later rose to command the 33rd Reconnaissance Squadron in Freiburg until in 1946 when he served under Paul Ramadier private staff.

He attended the Air School in 1947 and rose to be the deputy to the director of the Center for Higher Air Education in 1948 until he became the permanent staff of President of the Council, although, he headed the board from 1947, he was injured in the command air service in 1950, he became chief of staff of the 1st Air Division Lahr in 1951 followed a promotion to colonel in the same year, on that, he was moved back to 1st Division of the General Staff of the Armed Forces Paris, he was made the Chief of Staff of the French Air Force Rhine in 1954.

He was made General of the Air Brigade in 1956 to which he became the Chief of Staff for Pierre Guillaumat under the Prime Minister of the Armed Forces in 1959, although he was deputy to General Maurice Challe to 1958, he was moved to 5th Air Region Algiers as the Commander, he later rose to become the Major General of the Armed Forces, a deputy to the Chief of Joint Staff in March 1960 followed a promotion to Air Corps general to until he became the Chairman of the Joint Chiefs of Staff in April 1961, although the office was disbanded before and came under the Minister of the Armed Force, he was ranked to as the General of the Air Force in January 1962 before he was made the Inspector General of the Air Force July 1962 before becoming the Chief of Staff of the Air Force on 1 October 1963, he holds a record of about 5,000 flight hours before his retirement in February 1967 after reaching the mandatory age limit.

== Family ==
He married Paulette Armande Mouturat in August 1932.

== Death ==
He died on 21 March 2001 at Saint-Julien-le-Châtel. He was 80 years old.

== Decorations and year ==
- Grand Cross of the Legion of Honor, 1967
- Croix de Guerre 39/45 (Bronze Star), 1944
- Croix de Guerre (palm), 1944
- Croix de Guerre (palm), 1945
- Croix de Guerre (Bronze Star), 1945
- Cross of Military Valor (palm), 1960
- Aeronautics Medal, 1962
- Air Medal (US), 1945
- Distinguished Flying Cross, 1945
- Commander of Nicham Iftikhar, 1955
- Grand Cross of the Order of the Black Star, 1963

Military offices
| Preceded by Gaston Lavaud | Chief of the Joint Staff of the French Military; 1961-1962 | Succeeded by Charles Ailleret |
