= T 47-class destroyer =

Post WW2 French destroyer class

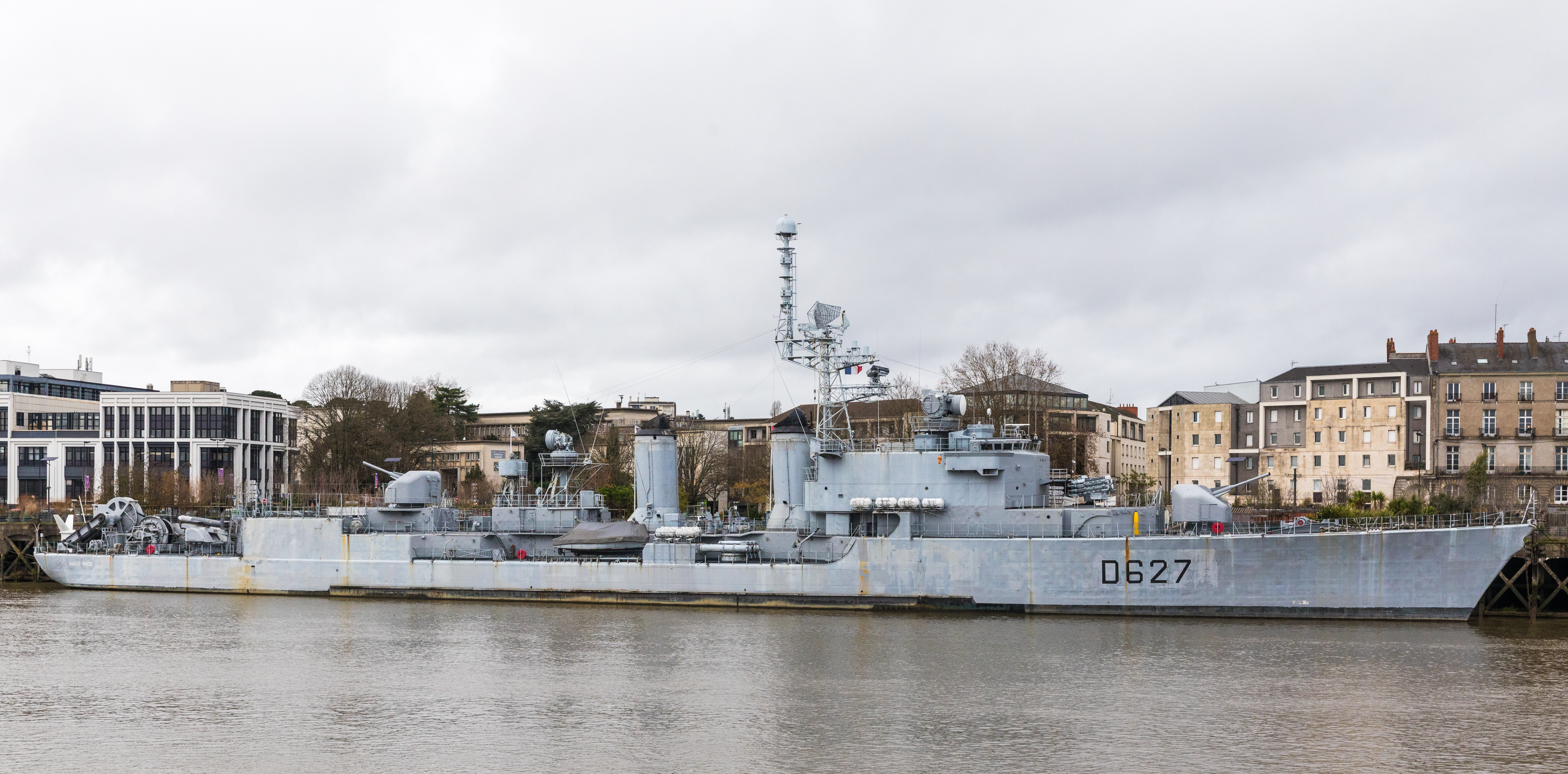
- Maillé-Brézé, now a museum ship in Nantes

Class overview
- Name: T 47 or Surcouf class
- Builders: Arsenal de Brest; Arsenal de Lorient; Forges et Chantiers de la Gironde; Ateliers et Chantiers de Bretagne
- Operators: French Navy
- Preceded by: Mogador class, Le Fier class, Le Hardi class
- Succeeded by: T 53 class
- Subclasses: Anti-submarine and anti-air variants after refit
- In commission: 1955–1991
- Completed: 12
- Retired: 11
- Preserved: 1

General characteristics
- Type: Destroyer
- Displacement: 2,750 long tons (2,794 t) standard; 3,740 long tons (3,800 t) full load
- Length: 128.6 m (421 ft 11 in)
- Beam: 12.7 m (41 ft 8 in)
- Draught: 5.4 m (17 ft 9 in)
- Installed power: 63,000 shp (47,000 kW)
- Propulsion: 4 boilers; Rateau geared steam turbines; 2 shafts
- Speed: 34 knots (63 km/h; 39 mph)
- Range: 5,000 nmi (9,300 km; 5,800 mi) at 18 kn (33 km/h; 21 mph)
- Complement: 347
- Armament: As built: 6 × Model 1948 127 mm (5 in) guns (3 twin turrets); 6 × 57mm/60 modèle 1951 guns (3 twin turrets); 4 × 20 mm (0.8 in) guns (4×1); 12 × 550 mm (21.7 in) torpedo tubes (4×3)

The T 47 class or Surcouf class were the first destroyers built for the French Navy after the Second World War. Twelve ships were built between 1955 and 1957. The ships were modernised in the 1960s and decommissioned in the 1980s, when they were replaced by the Cassard and Georges Leygues-class frigates. The class was authorised in 1949 and were designed as aircraft carrier escort vessels. Three were modified to become flagships, four became anti-air guided missile destroyers and five became anti-submarine destroyers. One member of the class survives, Maillé-Brézé as a museum ship at Nantes.

== Design and description ==
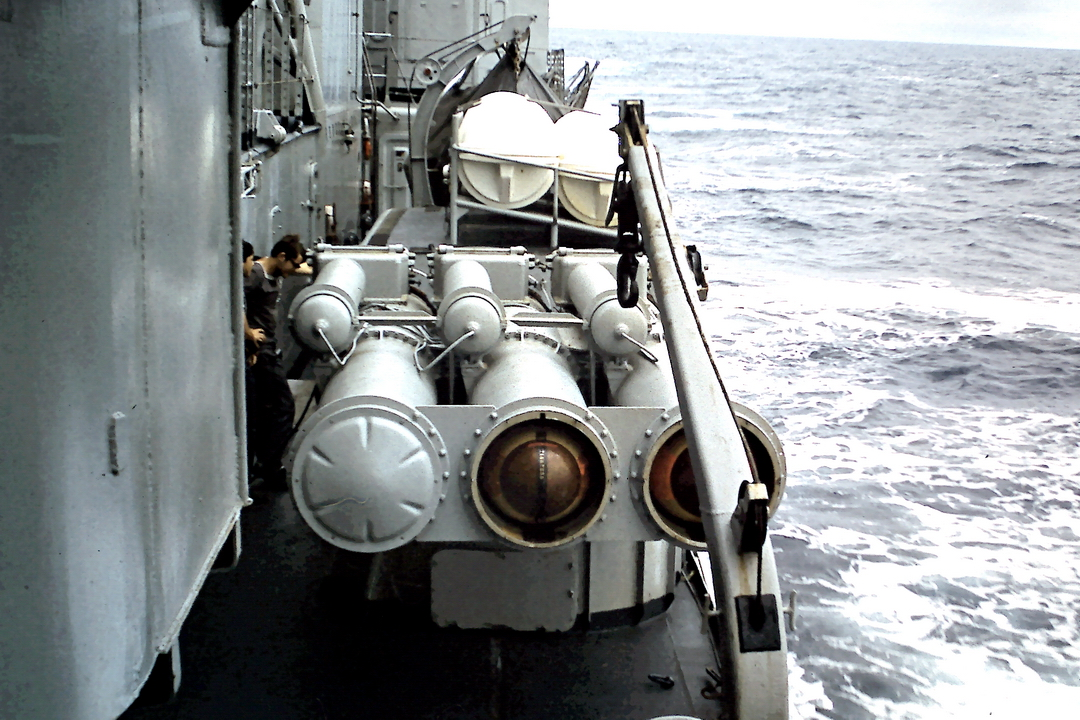
Triple torpedo launcher on Kersaint

These ships were based on the wartime Le Hardi class, but were enlarged and had a dual purpose armament. The ships were designed as squadron escorts (Escorteur d'escadre) rather than for independent operations, therefore they had a slower speed than their predecessors. As built, the vessels had standard displacement of 2,750 long tons (2,794 t) and 3,740 long tons (3,800 t) at full load. They measured 128.6 metres (421 ft 11 in) long overall with a beam 12.7 metres (41 ft 8 in) and a draught of 5.4 metres (17 ft 9 in). They were propelled by Rateau geared turbines turning two shafts rated at 63,000 shaft horsepower (47,000 kW), powered by four boilers raising steam at 500 pounds per square inch (3,400 kPa). They had a maximum speed of 34 knots (63 km/h; 39 mph) and a range of 5,000 nautical miles (9,300 km; 5,800 mi) at 18 knots (33 km/h; 21 mph). They carried 700 long tons (710 t) of fuel oil.

The class was initially designed for fleet anti-aircraft warfare (AA). The main guns were the dual-purpose French-designed Model 1948 127-millimetre (5 in)/54-calibre gun, which enabled them to use standard U.S. ammunition. The main armament was mounted in three twin turrets. The secondary armament was composed of 57mm/60 modèle 1951 guns in three twin turrets and four single-mounted 20 mm Oerlikon cannon. Their heavy AA armament was chosen due to the lack of pre-war vessels with this ability. Originally, the ships did not have much anti-submarine warfare (ASW) armament included in the design beyond depth charge racks. The design initially included a single quadruple mount of 550 mm (21.7 in) torpedo tubes mounted between the aft 127 mm and 57 mm gun mounts. This was changed to four triple banks of 550 mm torpedo tubes with two placed along either side of the ship. These forward pair were designed to fire L3 ASW homing torpedoes and the aft pair, either L3 torpedoes or K2 anti-ship torpedoes.

The ships were equipped with French sonars DUBV 1 and DUBA 1 mounted on the hull. They were intended to have a British-pattern lattice mast, but had twin tripods with lattice installed carrying a DRBV 11 surface and air search radar. They also carried DRBV 20A and DRBC 11 and DRBC 30 radars. The main armament was guided by a single fire control director, with a second slotted aft for the 57 mm guns. The ships had a complement of 347.

During the 1960s the entire class were modernised and modified as either flotilla flagships, anti-aircraft guided missile or anti-submarine destroyers.

=== Flagships ===
Three ships – Surcouf, Cassard, and Chevalier Paul – were converted into flotilla flagships (conducteurs de flottilles) between 1960 and 1962. One 57 mm gun turret, two triple torpedo launchers and two 20 mm guns were removed in order to enlarge the superstructure to accommodate an admiral, his staff, and additional communications equipment. They were modified as replacements for two light cruisers which had been withdrawn from service. In 1962, Cassard was used for helicopter experiments and fitted with a flight deck.

=== AAW modernisation ===
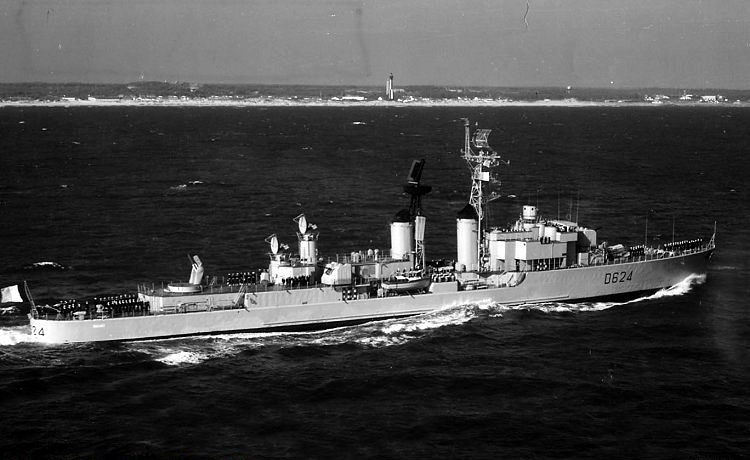
Bouvet after her Tartar refit

Four ships – Bouvet, Kersaint, Dupetit-Thouars and Du Chayla – were modernised as anti-aircraft guided missile destroyers in 1962–1965. They were given one Tartar missile launcher, retaining their three twin 57 mm turrets. They were also given one Model 1972 sextuple 375 mm (14.8 in) anti-submarine mortar. The missile launcher replaced the aft 127 mm turrets and a raised deckhouse was installed between the aft 57 mm guns where SPG-51 tracker-illuminators were situated. The Model 1972 mortar replaced the forward 127 mm turret and the fire control director for the main armament was removed. The DRBC 31 radar was moved to the fire control director's former spot atop the bridge and the DRBV 11 radar was replaced by an SPS-39A 3D model, later upgraded to the B model. The complement was reduced to 278, comprising 17 officers and 261 ratings.

Further upgrades including receiving a SENIT 2 action information centre within the bridge superstructure towards the aft and in 1979, two ships, Dupetit-Thouars and Du Chayla, had their DRBV 11 air search radar exchanged with a DRBV 22 system. Only the forward set of torpedo tubes were kept.

=== ASW modernisation ===
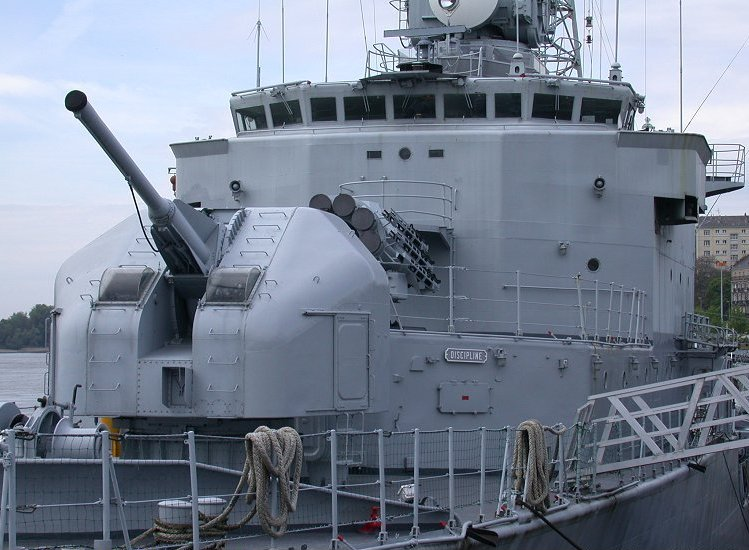
Bridge and 100 mm gun turret of Maillé-Brézé

Five ships – D'Estrées, Maillé-Brézé, Vauquelin, Casabianca and Guépratte – were modernised as anti-submarine destroyers in 1968–1970. D'Estrées had served as the trial vessel for French variable depth sonar in the early 1960s. The armament was modified to two Mod 53 100 mm (3.9 in) guns, one Mod 1972 375 mm sextuple anti-submarine rocket launcher, one Malafon anti-submarine missile launcher and two 20 mm guns. The Malafon system was installed aft with the magazine located directly in front of it. The single-mounted 100 mm guns were located fore and aft and were controlled by a DRBC 32A fire-control director. The 375 mm ASW mortar was situated in the "B" position forward.

The ships were given DRBV 22A air search radar situated atop the tripod mast with the DRBV 50 air/surface radar located below it. The five destroyers were had DUBV 23 and DUBV 43 sonars installed, with the new sonars requiring that the bow be reconfigured. Those that were modernised this way received a clipper bow and a stern anchor, which increased the overall length to 132.5 metres (434 ft 9 in). The complement was reduced to 260.

== Ships ==
T 47 (Surcouf)-class destroyers
Pennant	Name	Builder	Laid down	Launched	Commissioned	Modernisation	Fate
D621	Surcouf	Arsenal de Lorient	July 1951	3 October 1953	1 November 1955	Flagship	Accidentally rammed in 1971; Surviving aft part sunk as target in 1972
D622	Kersaint	Arsenal de Lorient	November 1951	3 October 1953	20 March 1956	Anti-air	Decommissioned 3 March 1984; Sunk as a target in the Atlantic, May 1986
D623	Cassard	Ateliers et Chantiers de Bretagne	November 1951	12 May 1953	14 April 1956	Flagship	Decommissioned 1 October 1974; Scrapped in Spain, 1989
D624	Bouvet	Arsenal de Lorient	June 1952	25 September 1954	13 May 1956	Anti-air	Decommissioned 1 January 1982; Served as breakwater at Lorient; Towed to Ghent, Belgium, for scrapping, September 2012
D625	Dupetit-Thouars	Arsenal de Brest	March 1952	4 February 1954	15 September 1956	Anti-air	Decommissioned April 1988; Breakwater at Lanvéoc
D626	Chevalier Paul	Forges et Chantiers de la Gironde	February 1952	28 July 1953	22 December 1956	Flagship	Decommissioned June 1971; Sunk off Toulon by Super Étendard aircraft from the carrier Clemenceau, May 1987
D627	Maillé-Brézé	Arsenal de Lorient	October 1953	2 July 1955	4 May 1957	Anti-submarine	Decommissioned 1 April 1988; Museum ship at Nantes
D628	Vauquelin	Arsenal de Lorient	March 1953	2 July 1955	3 November 1956	Anti-submarine	Decommissioned 6 November 1986; Used as a target for testing the Crotale NG missile system, 1988–2001; Sunk by Super Étendard aircraft from the aircraft carrier Charles de Gaulle, 13 February 2004, then destroyed with explosives by clearance divers
D629	D'Estrées	Arsenal de Brest	May 1953	27 November 1954	19 March 1957	Anti-submarine	Decommissioned 3 July 1985; Sunk off Toulon by a F17 Mod2 torpedo from the submarine Saphir, 12 September 2001
D630	Du Chayla	Arsenal de Brest	July 1953	27 November 1954	4 June 1957	Anti-air	Decommissioned 15 November 1991; Sunk off the coast of Brittany with explosives, September 2001
D631	Casabianca	Ateliers et Chantiers de Bretagne	October 1953	13 November 1954	4 May 1957	Anti-submarine	Decommissioned 7 September 1984; Sold for scrapping at Brest, 1987
D632	Guépratte	Forges et Chantiers de la Gironde	August 1953	8 November 1954	6 June 1957	Anti-submarine	Decommissioned 5 August 1985; Sunk in the Mediterranean by two Exocet AM39 missiles fired by a Super Étendard aircraft, 9 November 1994

== Service history ==
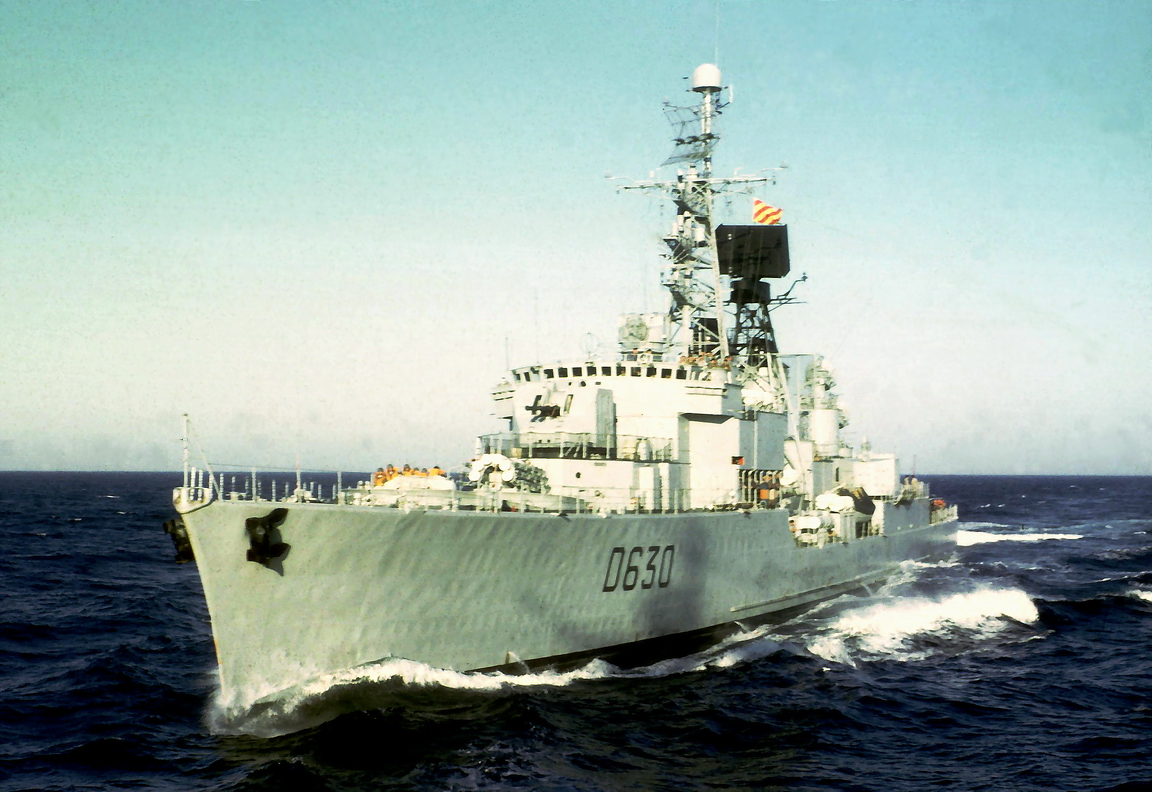
Du Chayla at sea

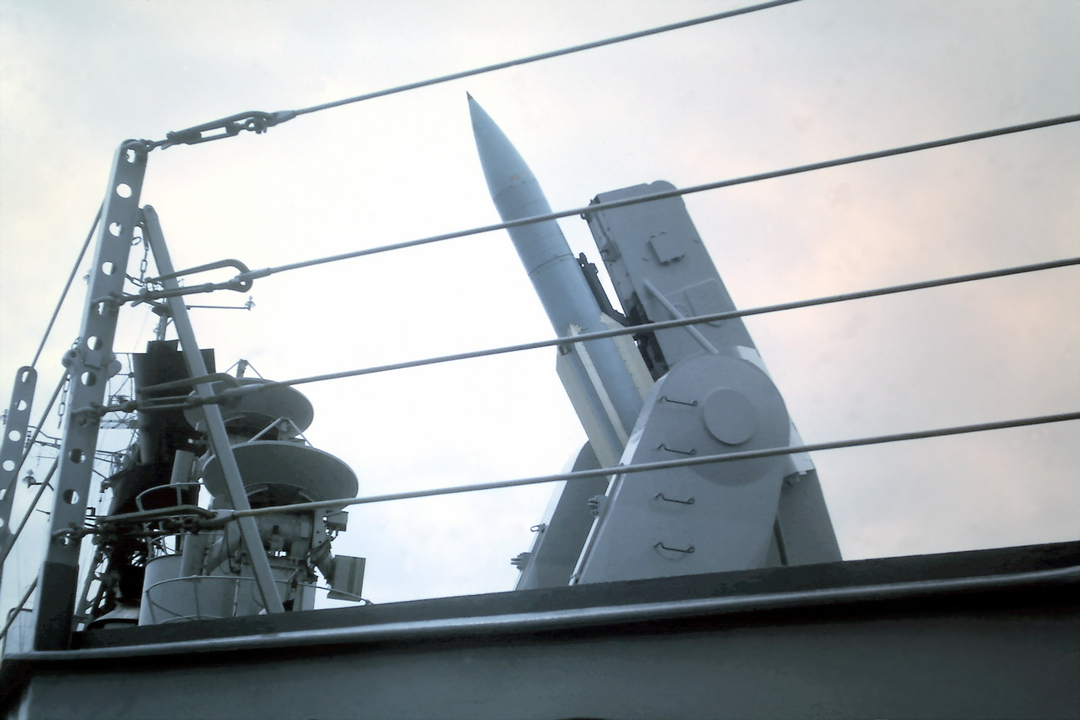
Tartar missile launcher on Kersaint

One ship was authorised under the 1949 building programme, one under the 1950, four in 1951 and eight in 1952. Bouvet, Kersaint, Dupetit-Thouars and Du Chayla all served with the Atlantic Squadron for their entire careers. Bouvet was taken out of service in 1982 and the ship's missile system was removed and installed on the new Cassard-class frigate Cassard. Kersaint was removed from service in 1983 and its missile system was installed aboard Jean Bart. The remaining two vessels remained in service until the Cassard class entered service in 1991. Kersaint's hull was used for testing shipboard fires after the Falklands War.

D'Estrées, Maillé-Brézé, Vauquelin, Casabianca and Guépratte remained in service until the mid-1980s when they were replaced with the Georges Leygues-class frigates. D'Estrées and Guépratte were assigned to the Mediterranean Squadron while the other three served with the Atlantic Squadron. After being taken out of service in 1988, Maillé-Brézé was made a museum ship at Nantes.

== See also ==
- List of escorteurs of the French Navy

Equivalent destroyers of the same era

- Daring class
- Akizuki class
- Friesland class
- Halland class
- Impetuoso class
- Forrest Sherman class
- Kotlin class
- Hamburg class

== Bibliography ==
- Blackman, Raymond V. B., ed. (1953). Jane's Fighting Ships 1953–54. London: Sampson, Low and Marston. OCLC 913556389.
- Jordan, John (1995). "France". In Chumbley, Stephen (ed.). Conway's All The World's Fighting Ships 1947–1995. Annapolis, Maryland: Naval Institute Press. pp. 95–131. ISBN 1-55750-132-7.
- Jordan, John (2020). "T47 Surcouf". In Jordan, John (ed.). Warship 2020. Oxford, UK: Osprey. pp. 180–183. ISBN 978-1-4728-4071-4.
- Moore, John, ed. (1974). Jane's Fighting Ships 1974–75. New York: Franklin Watts Incorporated. ISBN 0-531-02743-0.
