= Torpedo tube =

Device for launching torpedoes

A torpedo tube is a cylindrical device for launching torpedoes. There are two main types of torpedo tube: underwater tubes fitted to submarines and some surface ships, and deck-mounted units (also referred to as torpedo launchers) installed aboard surface vessels.

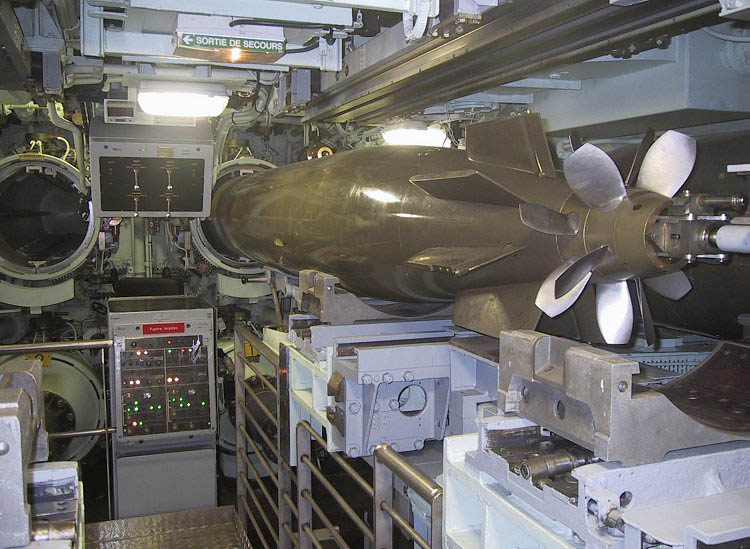
Torpedo tubes of the French SNLE Redoutable: French submarines use pistons to push the torpedo outside the tube, instead of blowing it out with compressed air.

Deck-mounted torpedo launchers are usually designed for a specific type of torpedo, while submarine torpedo tubes are general-purpose launchers, and are often also capable of deploying mines and cruise missiles. Most modern launchers are standardized on a 12.75-inch (324 mm) diameter for light torpedoes (deck mounted aboard ship) or a 21-inch (533 mm) diameter for heavy torpedoes (underwater tubes), introduction and standardization of said diameters was during 1963 and 1934 respectively, although torpedoes of other classes and diameters have been used.

== Submarine torpedo tube ==
A submarine torpedo tube is a more complex mechanism than a torpedo tube on a surface ship, because the tube has to accomplish the function of moving the torpedo from the normal atmospheric pressure within the submarine into the sea at the ambient pressure of the water around the submarine. Thus a submarine torpedo tube operates on the principle of an airlock.

=== Torpedo tube operation ===
A simplified diagram of a submarine torpedo tube

The diagram illustrates the operation of a submarine torpedo tube. The diagram is somewhat simplified but does show the working of a submarine torpedo launch.

A torpedo tube has a considerable number of interlocks for safety reasons. For example, an interlock prevents the breech door and muzzle door from opening at the same time.

The submarine torpedo launch sequence is, in simplified form:

1. Open the breech door in the torpedo room. Load the torpedo into the tube.
2. Hook up the wire-guide connection and the torpedo power cable.
3. Shut and lock the breech door.
4. Turn on power to the torpedo. A minimum amount of time is required for torpedo warmup. Fire control programs are uploaded to the torpedo.
5. Flood the torpedo tube. This may be done manually or automatically, from sea or from tanks, depending on the class of submarine. The tube must be vented during this process to allow for complete filling and eliminate air pockets which could escape to the surface or cause damage when firing.
6. Open the equalizing valve to equalize pressure in the tube with ambient sea pressure.
7. Open the muzzle door. If the tube is set up for Impulse Mode the slide valve will open with the muzzle door. If Swim Out Mode is selected, the slide valve remains closed. The slide valve allows water from the ejection pump to enter the tube.
8. When the launch command is given and all interlocks are satisfied, the water ram operates, thrusting a large volume of water into the tube at high pressure, which ejects the torpedo from the tube with considerable force. Modern torpedoes have a safety mechanism that prevents activation of the torpedo unless the torpedo senses the required amount of G-force.
9. The power cable is severed at launch. However, if a guidance wire is used, it remains connected through a drum of wire in the tube. Torpedo propulsion systems vary but electric torpedoes swim out of the tube on their own due to consistent power output and reduced weight and size. Torpedoes with 21-inch (530 mm) diameter and fuel-burning engines usually start outside the tube, however this is only true for older styles of torpedoes as since 2003 the US Navy began the Stealth Torpedo Enhancement Program. Under this program torpedoes, such as the Mark 48 were retrofitted with alternative propulsion including but not limited to electric fuel cells, such enables the torpedo to launch under its own power and avoid utilizing the noisier compressed air-launch system that older torpedoes utilized.
10. Once outside the tube the torpedo begins its run toward the target as programmed by the fire-control system. Attack functions are programmed but with wire guided weapons, certain functions can be controlled from the ship.
11. For wire-guided torpedoes, the muzzle door must remain open because the guidance wire is still connected to the inside of the breech door to receive commands from the submarine's fire-control system. A wire cutter on the inside of the breech door is activated to release the wire and its protective cable. These are drawn clear of the ship prior to shutting the muzzle door.
12. The drain cycle is a reverse of the flood cycle; water is returned to the boat's tanks. Commonly tubes will have drainage systems aided by compressed air that is pumped into the chamber to displace water and drain faster, the drained water goes into the drain tank where, especially on submarines and submersibles, the drained water is used to offset the weight of the launched torpedo to prevent a disruption of equilibrium.
13. Shut and lock the breech door.

Spare torpedoes are stored behind the tube in racks.

Speed is a desirable feature of a torpedo loading system, but safety is paramount. There are various manual and hydraulic handling systems for loading torpedoes into the tubes. Early US Submarines utilized manual block and tackle which took anywhere from 10-20 minutes to load a single tube depending on the skill of the crew and if the system was hydraulically assisted like in later submarines. It wasn't until 1976 that SSNs including succeeding the Los Angeles class utilize a hydraulic system (AWC) that is much faster, cutting the time down to 5 or less minutes, and safer in conditions where the ship needed to maneuver.

The German Type 212 submarine uses a new development of the water ram expulsion system, which ejects the torpedo with water pressure to avoid acoustic detection.

== Gallery ==
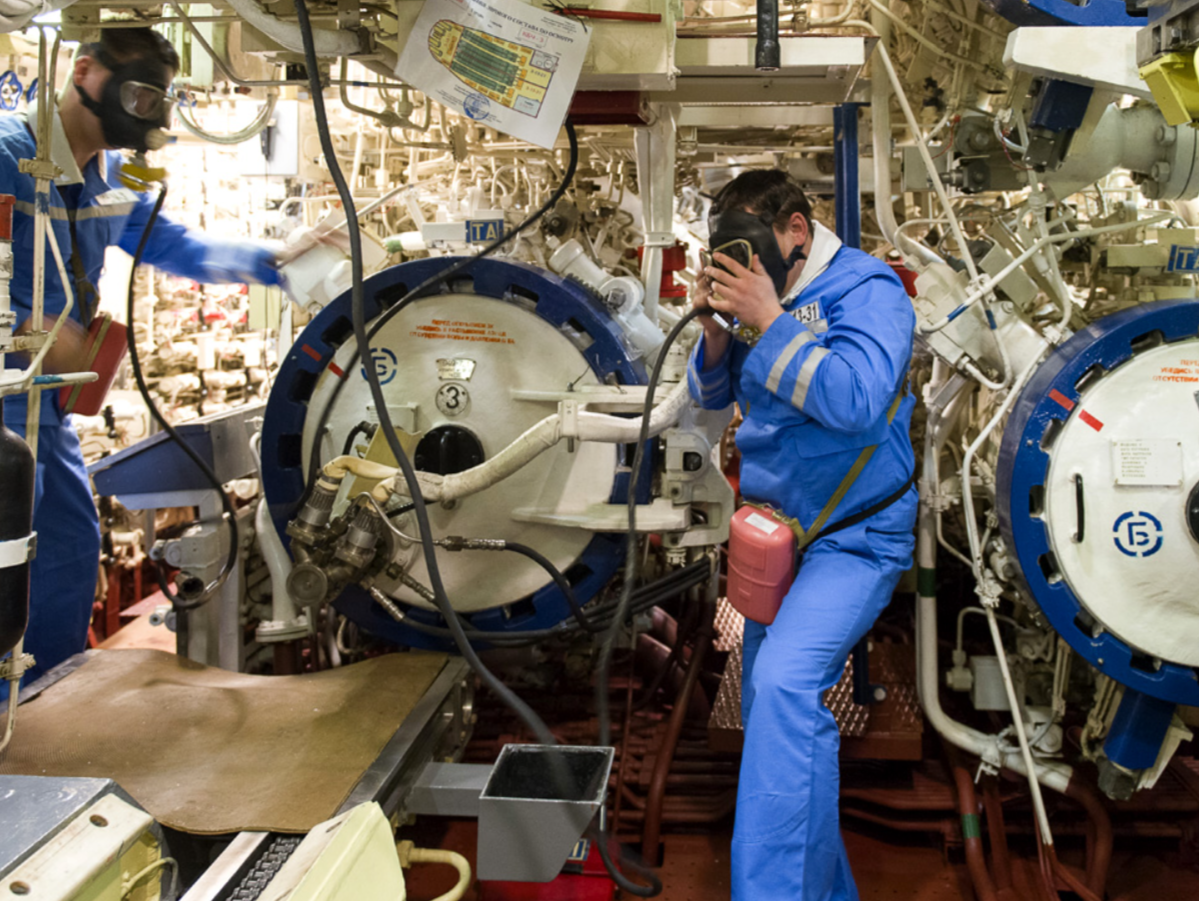
Torpedo tubes on the nuclear submarine Pacific Fleet

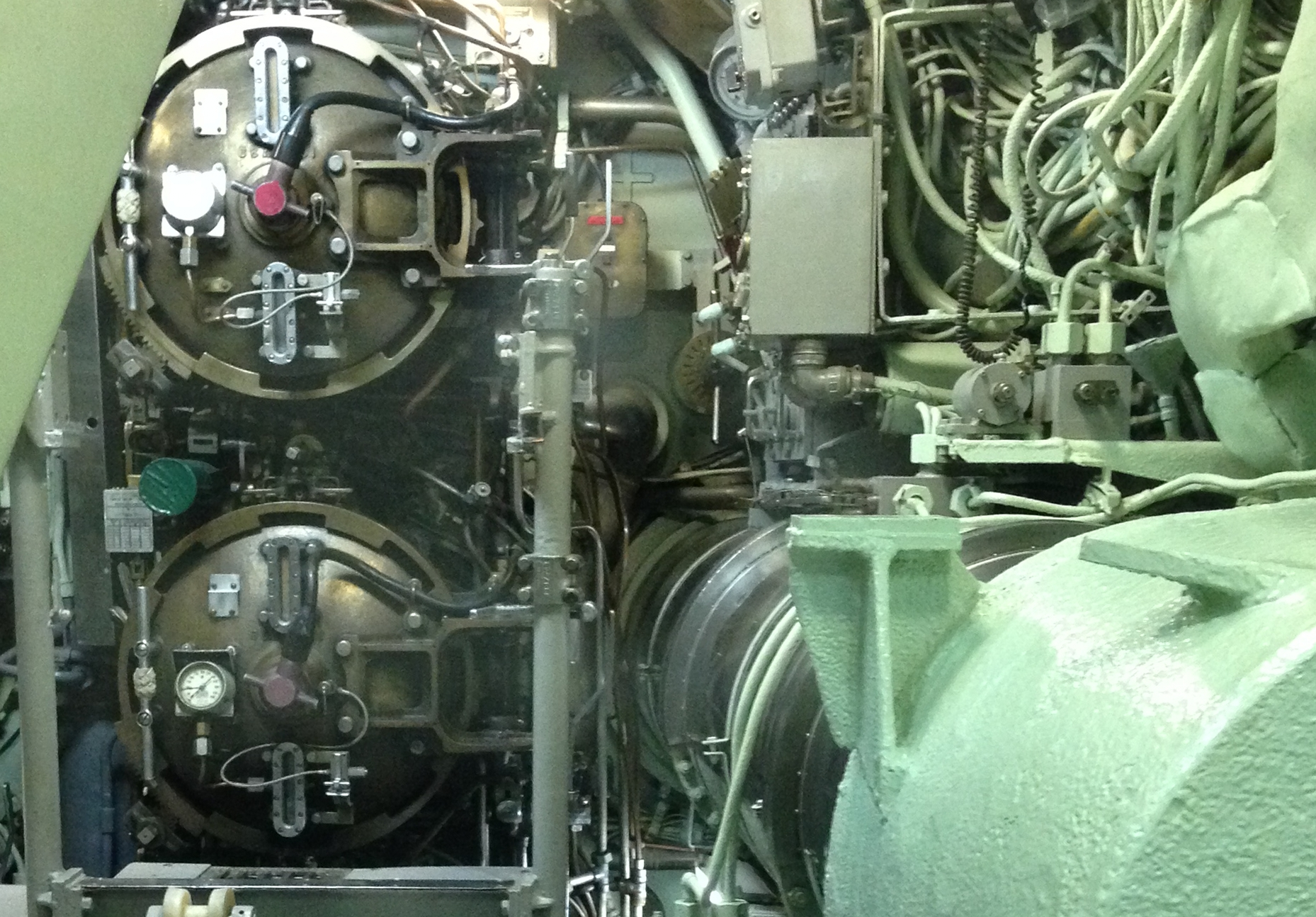
Submarine torpedo tube breech doors of USS Nautilus in their closed position

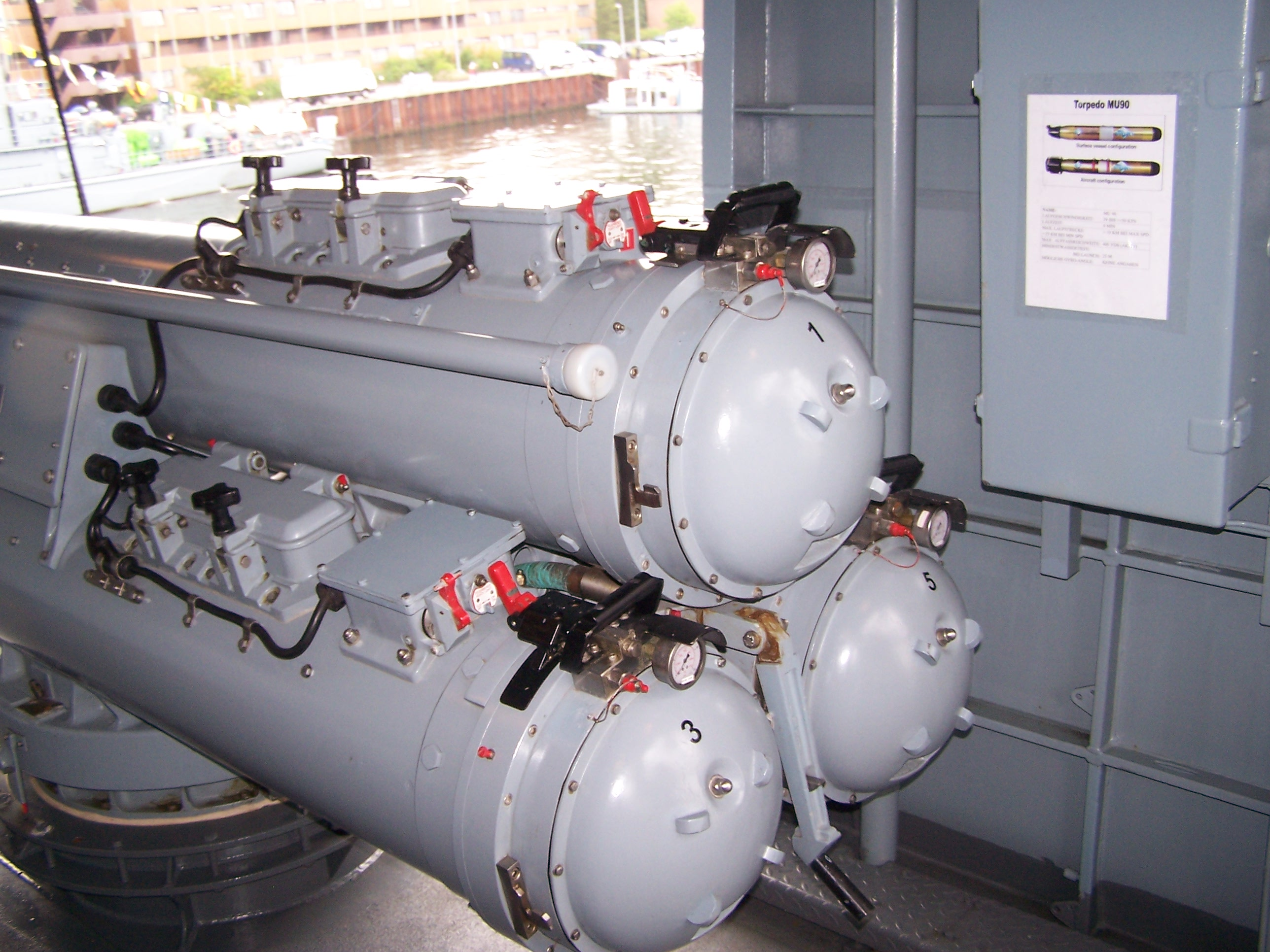
MU90 Impact triple launcher onboard F221 Hessen, a modern Sachsen-class frigate of the German Navy

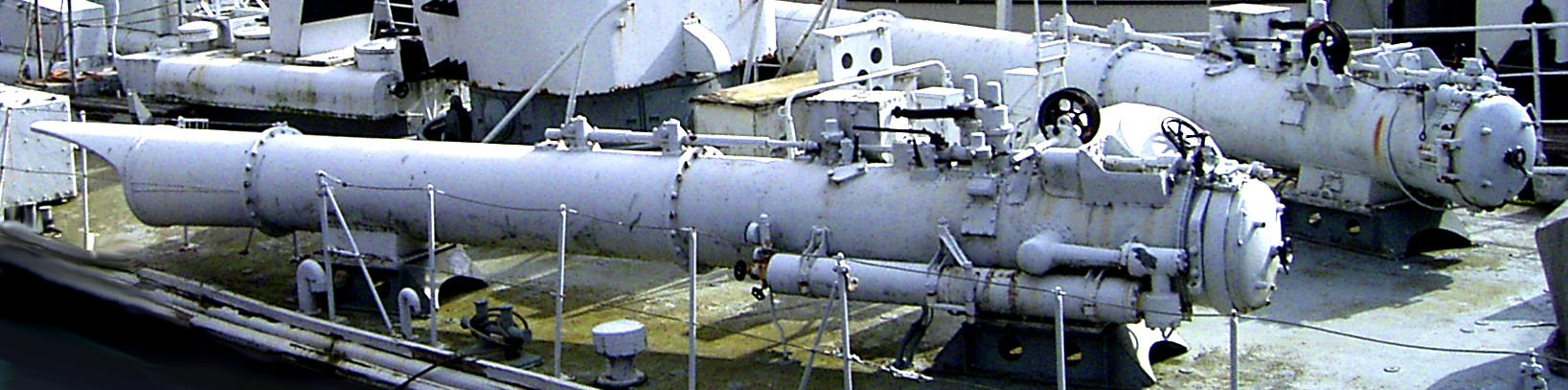
Rear torpedo tube of a former German Jaguar class Schnellboot (MTB)

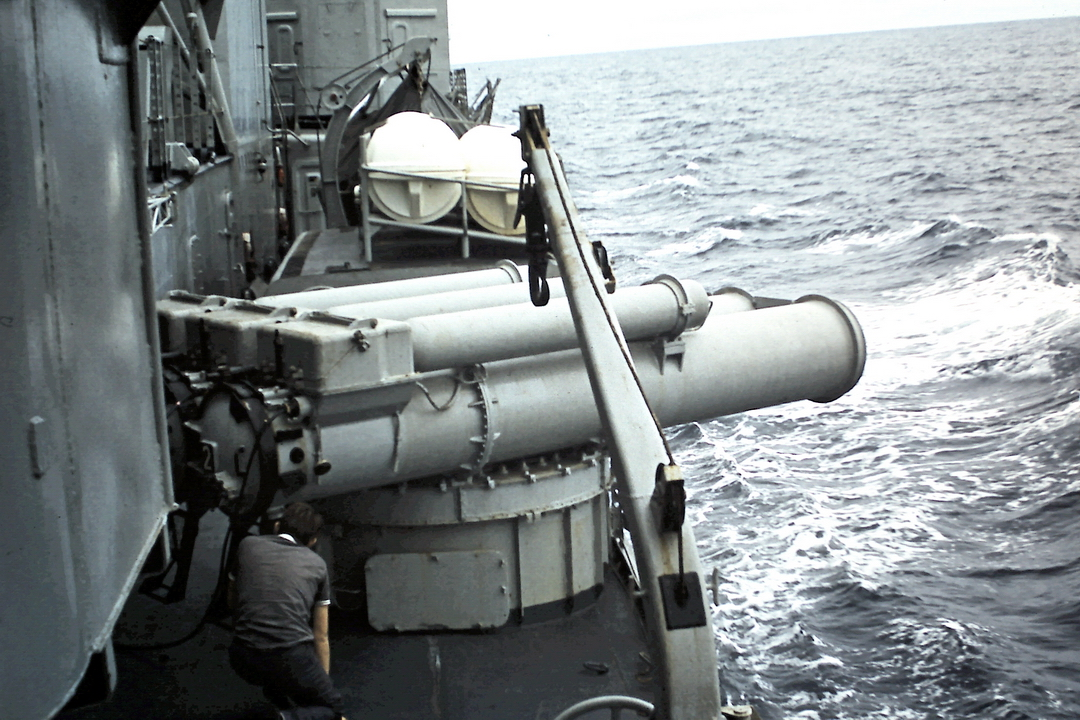
The French destroyer Kersaint prepares to launch a torpedo in 1970

== See also ==
- List of torpedoes by name
