= 1962 Isly massacre =

1962 massacre of Pied-Noirs by the French Army

- Part of the Algerian War and the Battle of Bab El Oued
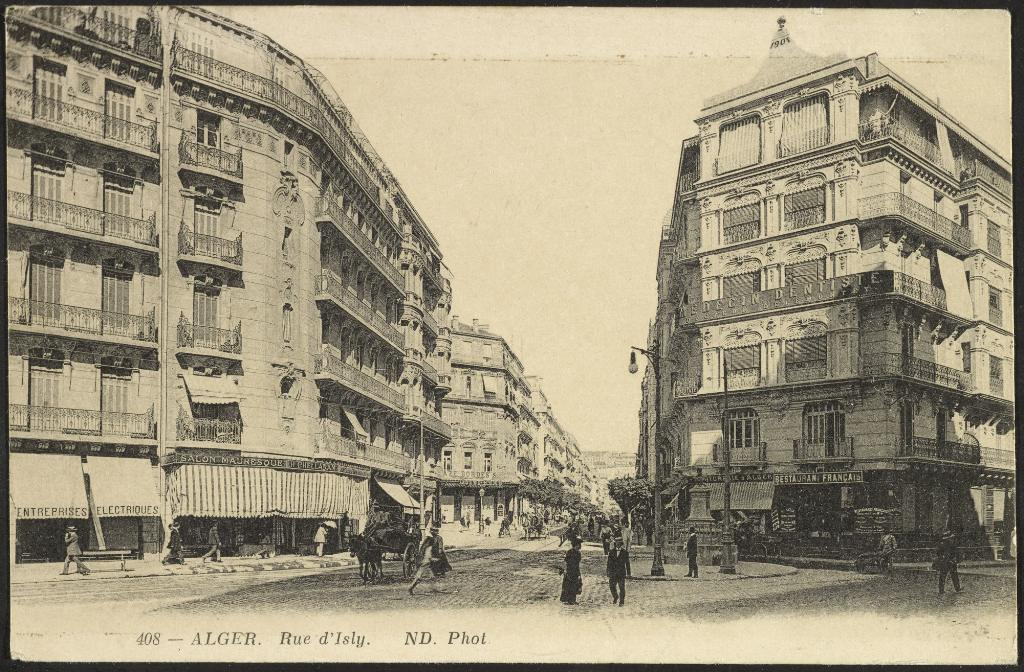
- Photograph of the Rue d'Isly
- Location: Algiers, French Algeria
- Date: 26 March 1962
- Target: Pied-Noir pro-colonialism demonstrators
- Attack type: Massacre
- Deaths: 50-80
- Injuries: 200
- Perpetrator: French Army

The 1962 Isly massacre was an incident during the Algerian War when French Army soldiers opened fire on a crowd of Pied-Noir demonstrators marching in support of France's control over Algeria on 26 March 1962. Following the army's blockade of Bab El Oued, which served as the headquarters of the Organisation armée secrète (OAS), the OAS called for massive demonstrations to force an end to the blockade. In response to the call, as well as news of the signing of the Évian Accords, which ended the Algerian War by confirming Algeria's independence, crowds of anti-independence Pied-Noirs marched throughout Algiers, denouncing the treaty.

A 45-man detachment of the French Army's 4th Tirailleur Regiment, most of whom were conscripted Algerian Muslims, manning a roadblock panicked and opened fire on a crowd of demonstrators who were marching towards the neighbourhood of Bab El Oued, killing between 50 and 80 Pied-Noir civilians. In response to news of the massacre, Pied-Noirs began a mass exodus from Algeria to Metropolitan France. On 26 January 2022, President of France Emmanuel Macron formally acknowledged the massacre, which he described as "unforgivable".

== Background ==
Algeria was gradually incorporated into the French colonial empire after France began a military conquest in 1830. The region became known as French Algeria, and hundreds of thousands of European immigrants known as Pied-Noirs (Black Feet), the vast majority of whom were of French descent, began to immigrate to the colony. By the mid-20th century, there were approximately a million Pied-Noirs residing in French Algeria, with most having been born in North Africa instead of Europe; cumulatively, they formed roughly ten percent of Algeria's population in the mid-1950s.

On 1 November 1954, the anti-colonial National Liberation Front (FLN) launched a series of attacks against military, police and civilian targets, sparking the Algerian War. The FLN carried out guerrilla operations against the French authorities, who responded by waging a brutal military counterinsurgency. After seven years of fighting, president of France Charles de Gaulle signed the Évian Accords with the FLN's provisional government on 18 March 1962, ending the war; the treaty proved unpopular with most Pied-Noirs, who supported continued French rule in Algeria.

== Massacre ==
On 26 March, a crowd of Pied-Noirs marched in the Algerian capital of Algiers in opposition to the Évian Accords, as they did not wish for Algeria to become independent of French colonial rule. The French Army, anticipating violent confrontations with anti-independence Pied-Noirs, had installed roadblocks throughout the city, including one on the Rue d'Isly. As the crowd was attempting to march towards the neighbourhood of Bab El Oued, they were confronted on the Rue d'Isly by 45 soldiers from the French Army's 4th Tirailleur Regiment, which was composed mainly of conscripted Algerian Muslims. This unit was one of the remaining mostly (80%) Muslim infantry regiments of the French Army of Africa. On 17 March 1962 it had been brought into Algiers from active service in the Algerian countryside (bled) to take up urban pacification duties for which the young tirailleurs were not trained or prepared.

The soldiers manning the roadblock (who were later described as "poorly commanded and deployed against their will") panicked and responded to the unarmed crowd's continual advance towards them by opening fire on them with machine guns. Reportedly shots were first fired by an unknown sniper on a nearby rooftop. The troops continued to fire at the crowd for approximately fifteen minutes, shooting nearly 300 demonstrators and scattering the rest. One woman screamed "Stop firing! My God, we're French..." before she was shot down. It was subsequently estimated that the massacre's death toll amounted to at least 50 people; the highest estimates claimed that 80 were killed. Another 200 were wounded. News of the massacre spread throughout Algeria after it occurred.

== Aftermath ==
In response to news of the massacre, Pied-Noirs began a mass exodus from Algeria to Metropolitan France, which would eventually involve the migration of roughly 900,000 people; the majority of them settled in Southern France. After arriving in France, the Pied-Noirs were "deeply impacted by the sense of loss and longing for their country of birth" and "faced discrimination in France and were treated as outsiders." In France, several Pied-Noir activist organisations consistently lobbied for the government of France to issue a public acknowledgement of the massacre in 1962.

Enraged by the massacre, the Pied-Noirs, blaming FLN agent provocateurs for the killings, lynched 10 Muslims.

The 4th Tirailleurs was disbanded on 31 May, two months after the massacre. It was concluded that to deploy exhausted and demoralised Muslim troops untrained for police duties, under only one junior officer, to control a large and excited crowd of European demonstrators had been a serious error of judgement.

On 26 January 2022, French president Emmanuel Macron acknowledged the massacre in a meeting with a group of French citizens of Pied-Noir descent at the Élysée Palace. In a speech, Macron stated that "this massacre of March 26, 1962 is unforgivable for the Republic. That day, French soldiers, deployed counter-intuitively, morally damaged, fired on the French. It is high time to say it. What was to be an operation of order ended in a massacre." Macron also expressed remorse that Pied-Noirs in France "were not received and listened to" by the French government.
